= Poseidon =

Ancient Greek god of the sea, earthquakes, and horses

- King of the sea; God of the sea, storms, earthquakes, and horses
- Member of the twelve Olympians
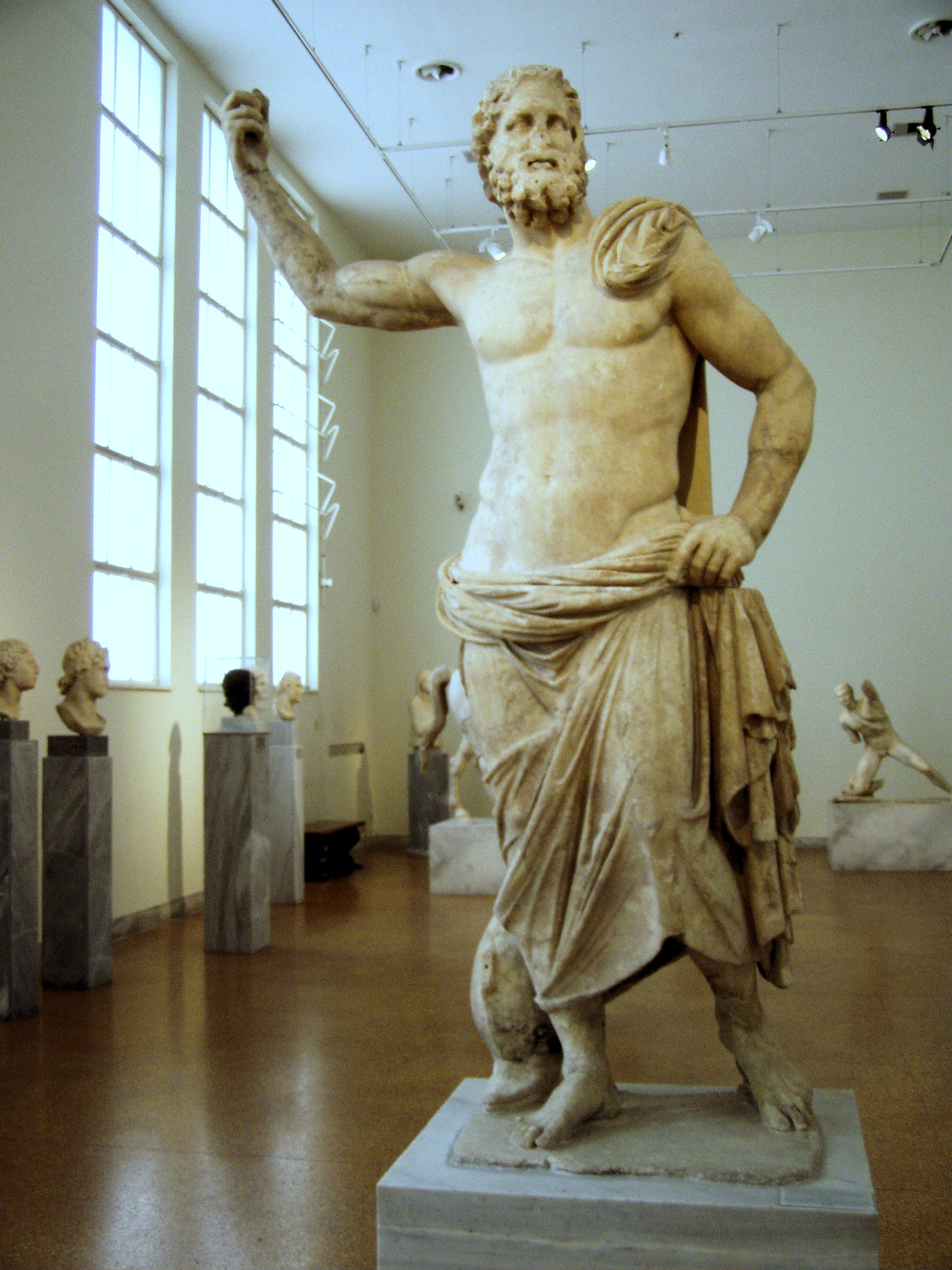
- The Poseidon of Melos, a statue of Poseidon found in Milos in 1877
- Abode: Mount Olympus, or the sea
- Symbol: Trident, fish, dolphin, horse, bull

Genealogy
- Parents: Cronus and Rhea
- Siblings: Hades, Demeter, Hestia, Hera, Zeus
- Consort: Amphitrite

Equivalents
- Roman: Neptune

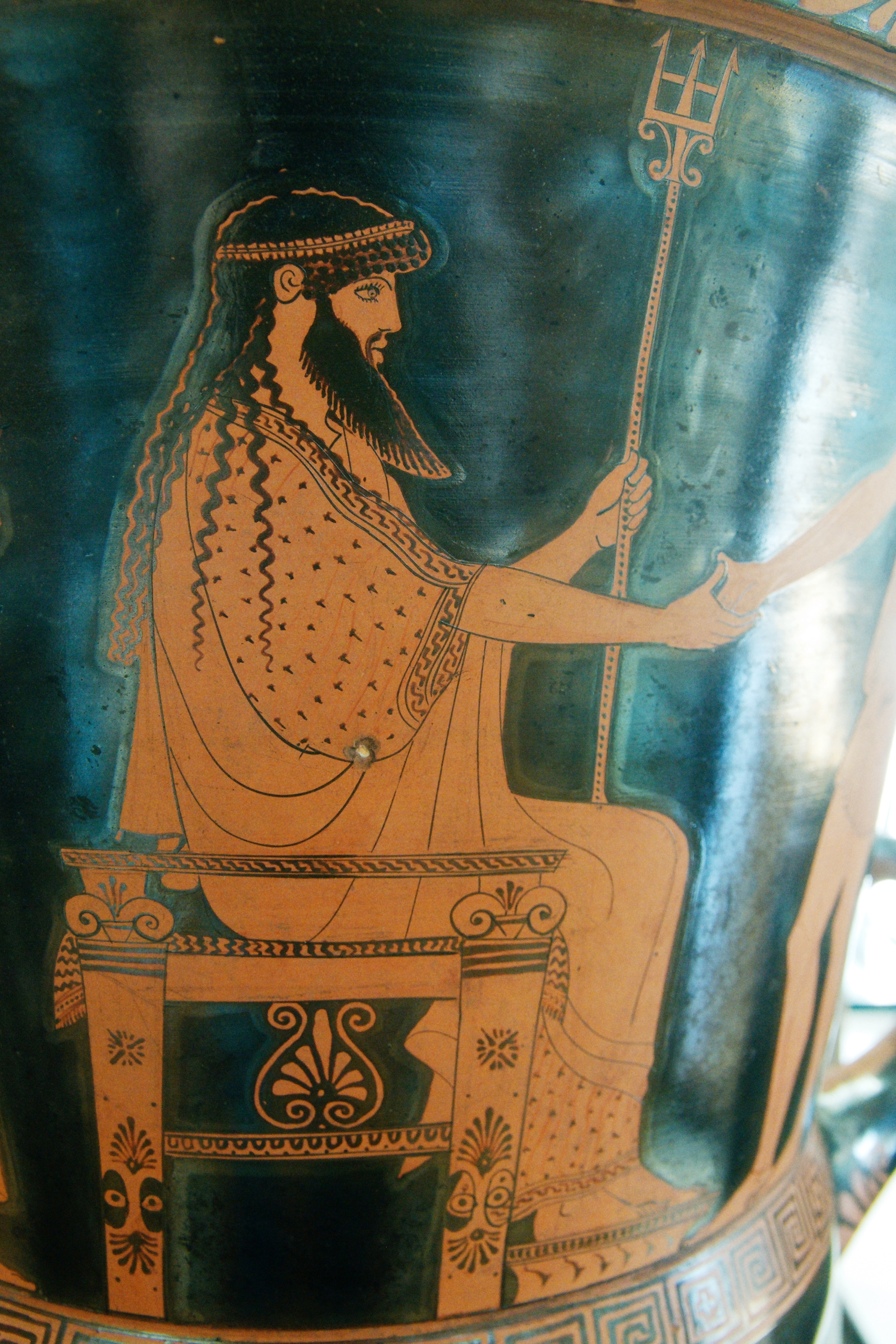
Poseidon greeting Theseus (on the right). Detail, Attic red-figured calyx-krater by Syriscos Painter, 450-500BC from Agrigento. BnF Museum (Cabinet des médailles), Paris

Poseidon (/pəˈsaɪdən, pɒ-, poʊ-/; Ancient Greek: Ποσειδῶν, romanised: Poseidôn) is one of the twelve Olympians in ancient Greek religion and mythology, presiding over the sea, storms, earthquakes and horses. He was the protector of seafarers and the guardian of many Hellenic cities and colonies. In pre-Olympian Bronze Age Greece, Poseidon was venerated as a chief deity at Pylos and Thebes, with the cult title "earth shaker"; in the myths of isolated Arcadia, he is related to Demeter and Despoina and was venerated as a horse, and as a god of the waters. Poseidon maintained both associations among most Greeks: he was regarded as the tamer or father of horses, who, with a strike of his trident, created springs (the terms for horses and springs are related in the Greek language). His Roman equivalent is Neptune.

Homer reports that Poseidon became lord of the sea when, following the overthrow of his father Cronus, the world was divided by lot among Cronus' three sons; Zeus received the sky, Hades the underworld, and Poseidon the sea, with the Earth and Mount Olympus belonging to all three. In Plato's Timaeus and Critias, the legendary island of Atlantis was Poseidon's domain. In Homer's Iliad, Poseidon supports the Greeks against the Trojans during the Trojan War. In the Odyssey, during the sea-voyage from Troy back home to Ithaca, the Greek hero Odysseus provokes Poseidon's fury by blinding his son, the Cyclops Polyphemus, resulting in Poseidon punishing him with storms, causing the complete loss of his ship and numerous of his companions, and delaying his return by ten years.

According to legend, Athena became the patron goddess of the city of Athens after a competition with Poseidon, though he remained on the Acropolis in the form of his surrogate, Erechtheus. After the fight, Poseidon sent a monstrous flood to the Attic plain to punish the Athenians for not choosing him. Other myths describe similar contests between Poseidon and another deity for the patronage of a city.

== Etymology ==
The earliest attested occurrence of the god's name, written in Linear B, is 𐀡𐀮𐀅𐀃 Po-se-da-o or 𐀡𐀮𐀅𐀺𐀚 Po-se-da-wo-ne, which correspond to Ποσειδάων (Poseidaōn) and Ποσειδάϝoνος (Poseidawonos) in Mycenean Greek; in Homeric Greek, it appears as Ποσιδάων (Posidaōn); in Aeolic, as Ποτε(ι)δάων (Pote(i)daōn); in Doric, as Ποτειδάν (Poteidan) and Ποτειδᾶς (Poteidas); in Arcadic, as Ποσoιδᾱν (Posoidan). In inscriptions with Laconic style from Tainaron, Helos and Thuria the god's name is rendered as Ποὁιδάν (Pohoidan), indicating that the Dorians took the name from the older population. The form Ποτειδάϝων (Poteidawōn) appears in Corinth.

The origins of the name "Poseidon" are unclear and the possible etymologies are contradictive among the scholars. One theory breaks it down into an element meaning "husband" or "lord" (Greek πόσις (posis), from PIE *pótis) and another element meaning "earth" (δᾶ (da), Doric for γῆ (gē)), producing something like lord or spouse of Da, i.e. of the earth; this would link him with Demeter, "Earth-mother". Burkert finds that "the second element δᾶ- remains hopelessly ambiguous" and finds a "husband of Earth" reading "quite impossible to prove". According to Beekes in Etymological Dictionary of Greek, "there is no indication that δᾶ means 'earth'", although the root da appears in the Linear B inscription E-ne-si-da-o-ne, "earth-shaker".

Another theory interprets the second element as related to the (presumed) Doric word *δᾶϝον dâwon, "water", Proto-Indo-European *dah₂- "water" or *dʰenh₂- "to run, flow", Sanskrit दन् dā́-nu- "fluid, drop, dew" and names of rivers such as Danube (< *Danuvius) or Don. This would make *Posei-dawōn into the master of waters.

Plato in his dialogue Cratylus gives two traditional etymologies: either the sea restrained Poseidon when walking as a "foot-bond" (ποσίδεσμον), or he "knew many things" (πολλά εἰδότος or πολλά εἰδῶν).

Beekes suggests that the word has probably a Pre-Greek origin. The original form was probably the Mycenean Greek Ποτ(σ)ειδάϝων (Pot(s)eidawōn). "The intervocalic aspiration suggests a Pre-Greek (Pelasgian) origin rather than an Indo-European one".

== Bronze Age Greece ==
=== Linear B (Mycenean Greek) inscriptions ===
If surviving Linear B clay tablets can be trusted, the names po-se-da-wo-ne and Po-se-da-o ("Poseidon") occur with greater frequency than does di-u-ja ("Zeus"). A feminine variant, po-se-de-ia, is also found, indicating a lost consort goddess, in effect the precursor of Amphitrite.

Poseidon was the chief god at Pylos. The title wa-na-ka appears in the inscriptions. Poseidon was identified with the title wanax from the Homeric era to classical Greece. The title didn't mean only king, but also protector. Wanax had chthonic aspects, and he was closely associated with Poseidon, who had the title "Lord of the Underworld". The chthonic nature of Poseidon is also indicated by his title E-ne-si-da-o-ne (Earth-shaker) in Mycenean Knossos and Pylos. Through Homer the epithet was also used in classical Greece. (Ennosigaios, ennosidas).

Po-tini-ja (potnia: lady or mistress) was the chief goddess at Pylos and she was closely associated with Poseidon. She was the Mycenean goddess of nature and Poseidon—Wanax is one from the gods who may be considered her "male paredros". The earth shaker received offerings in the cave of the goddess of childbirth Eileithyia at Amnisos in Crete. Poseidon is allied with Potnia and the divine child.

Wa-na-ssa (anassa: queen or lady) appears in the inscriptions usually in plural. (Wa-na-ssoi). The dual number is common in Indo-European grammar (usually for chthonic deities like the Erinyes) and the duality was used for Demeter and Persephone in classical Greece (the double named goddesses). Potnia and wanassa refer to identical deities or two aspects of the same deity.

E-ri-nu (Erinys) is attested in the inscriptions. In some ancient cults Erinys is related to Poseidon and her name is an epithet of Demeter.

It is possible that Demeter appears as Da-ma-te in a Linear B inscription (PN EN 609), however the interpretation is still under dispute. Si-to Po-tini-ja is probably related with Demeter as goddess of grain.

Tablets from Pylos record sacrificial goods destined for "the Two ladies and the Lord" (or "to the Two Queens and the King": wa-na-soi, wa-na-ka-te). Wa-na-ssoi may be related with Demeter and Persephone, or their precursors, goddesses who were not associated with Poseidon in later periods.

=== Mycenean cult ===
During the Mycenean period, the ancestral male gods of the Myceneans were probably not represented in human forms, and the information given by the tablets found at Pylos and Knossos is insufficient. Poseidon was the chief deity at Pylos and Thebes. He is identified with Anax and he carried the title "Master of the Underworld". Anax had probably a cult associated with the protection of the palace. In Acrocorinth he was worshipped as Poseidon Anax during the Mycenean age. In the city, there was the famous spring Peirene, which in a myth is related to the winged horse Pegasus. In Attica there was a cult of Anax heroes who was connected to Poseidon. A cult title of Poseidon was "earth-shaker" and in Knossos he was worshipped together with the goddess Eleithyia who was related to the annual birth of the divine child. Potnia was the Mycenean goddess of nature and she was the consort of Poseidon at Pylos. She is mentioned together with bucrania in decorated jugs and he was associated with the animals and especially to the bull. In Athens, Poseidon was an inland god who created the salt-sea Erecthēιs (Ερεχθηίς), "sea of Erechtheus". In Acropolis his cult was superimposed on the cult of the local ancestral figure Erechtheus. In Athens and Asine he was worshipped in the house of the king during the Mycenean period. The bull was the favourite animal for sacrifices and it seems that horses were rarely used during the burial of the Mycenean leaders.

=== Arcadian myths ===
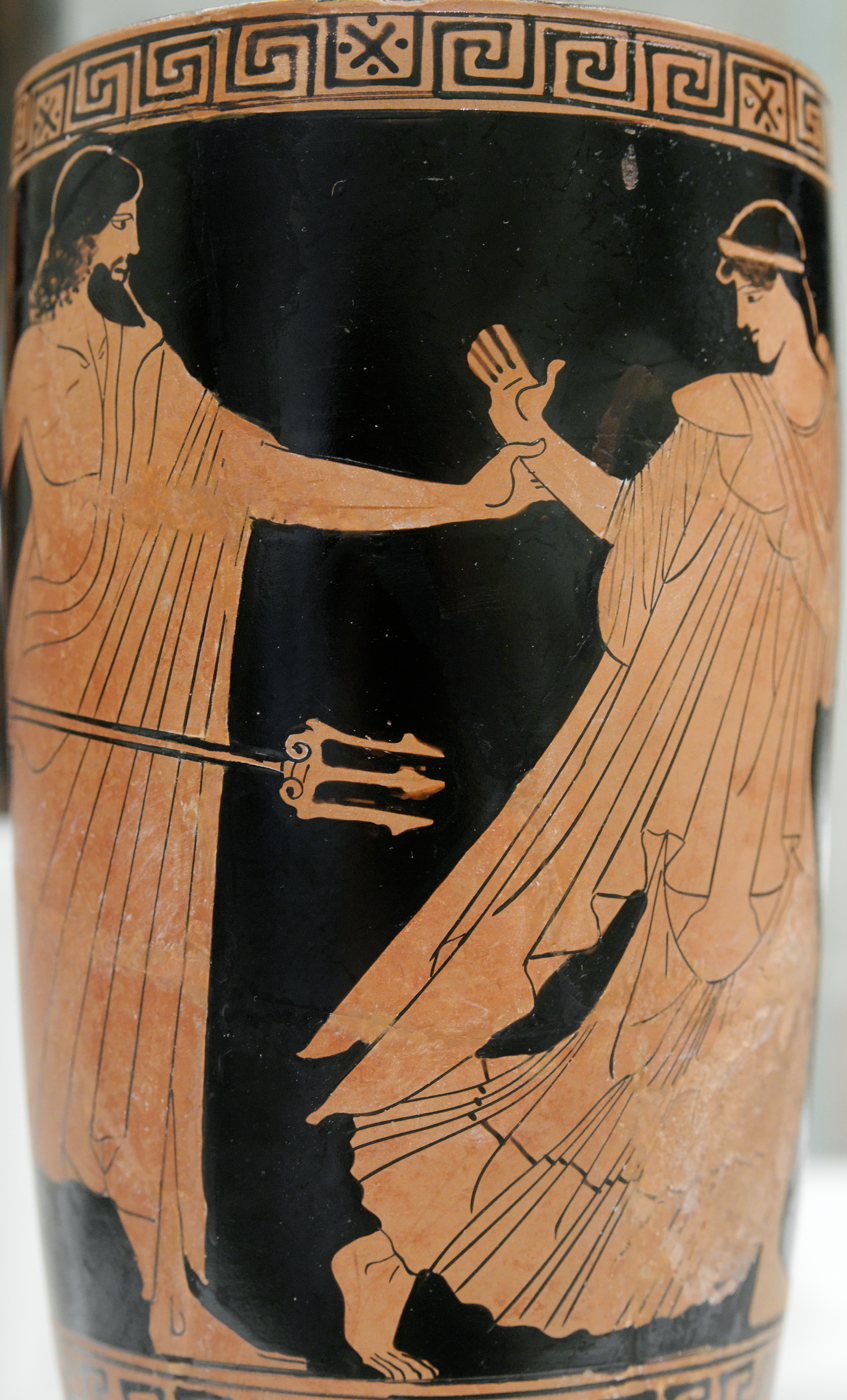
Poseidon pursuing a woman, probably by Achilleus painter, 480–450BC. Metropolitan Museum of Art, Manhattan NY

In the Arcadian myths, Poseidon is related to Demeter and Despoina and he was worshipped with the surname Hippios in many Arcadian cities. At Thelpusa and Phigalia there were sister worships which are very important for the study of primitive religions. In these cults Demeter and Poseidon were chthonic divinities of the underworld.

Near Thelpusa the river Ladon descended to the sanctuary of Demeter Erinys (Demeter-Fury). During her wandering in search of her daughter Demeter changed into a mare to avoid Poseidon. Poseidon took the form of a stallion and after their mating she gave birth to a daughter whose name was not allowed to be told to the uninitiated and a horse called Arion (very swift). Her daughter obviously had the shape of a mare too. At first Demeter became angry and she was given the surname Erinys (fury) by the Thelpusians. The Erinyes were deities of vengeance, and Erinys had a similar function with the goddess Dike (Justice). In the very old myth of Thelpusa Demeter-Erinys and Poseidon are divinities of the underworld in a pre-mythic period. Poseidon appears as a horse. In Greek folklore the horses had chthonic associations and it was believed that they could create springs. In European folklore the water-creatures or water-spirits appear with the shape of a horse or a bull. In Greece the river god Acheloos is represented like a bull or a man-bull. Many people when sacrificed to Demeter should make a premilinary sacrifice to Acheloos

At Phigalia Demeter had a sanctuary in a cavern and she was given the surname Melaina (black). The goddess was related to the black underworld. In a similar myth Poseidon appears as a horse and Demeter gives birth to a daughter whose name was not allowed to be told to the unitiated (At Lycosura her daughter was called Despoina). Demeter, angry with Poseidon, put on a black dressing and shut herself in the cavern. When the fruits of the earth were perished, Zeus sent the Moirai to Demeter who listened to them and put aside her wrath.

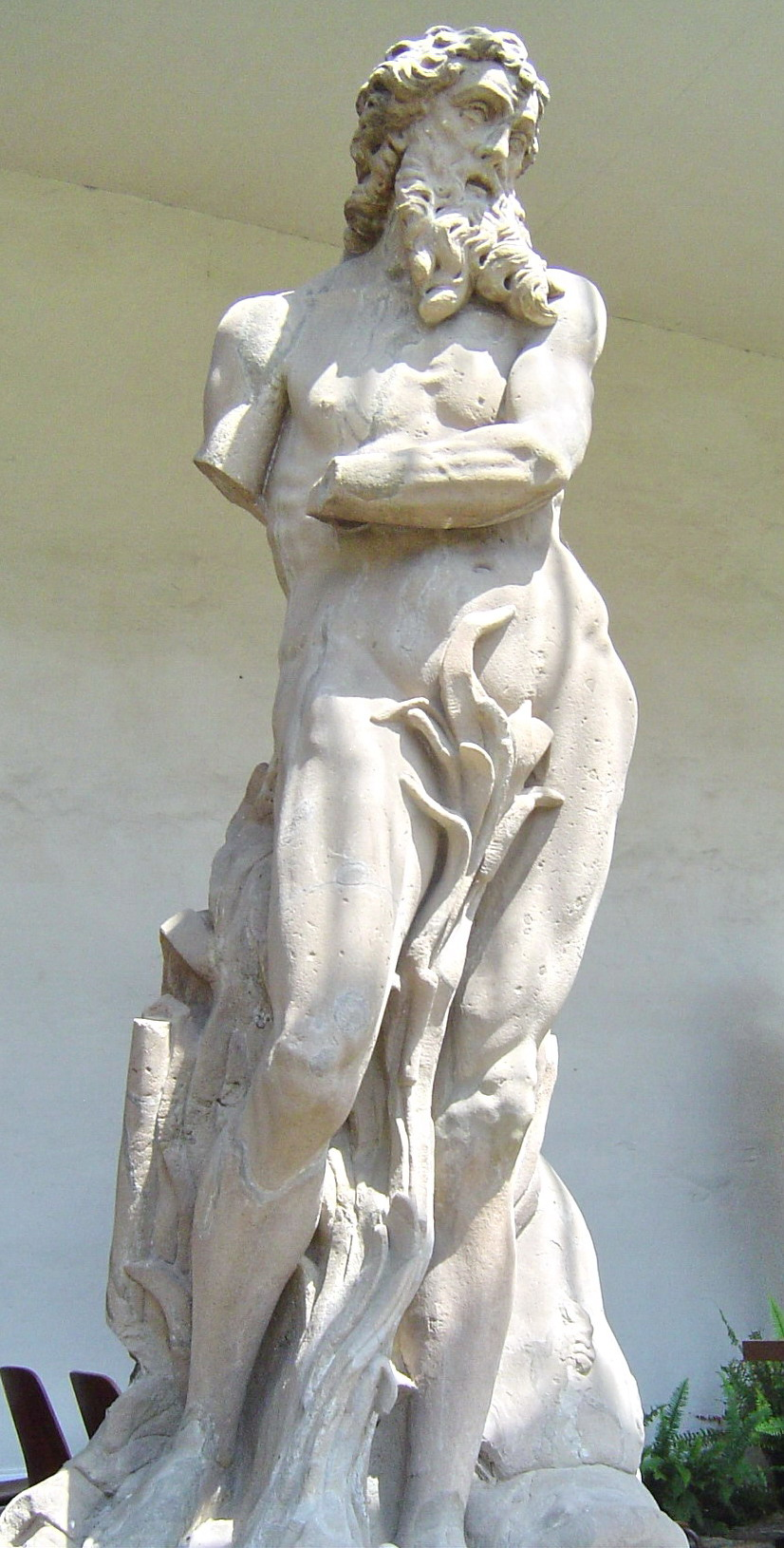
Statue of Poseidon in Germany by Johann David Räntz and Lorenz Wilhelm Räntz (1760).

In another Arcadian myth when Rhea had given birth to Poseidon, she told Cronus that she had given birth to a horse, and gave him a foal to swallow instead of the child. In the Homeric Hymn to Demeter the goddess puts on a dark mourning robe around her shoulders as a sign of her sorrow. Demeter's mare-form was worshipped into historical times. The xoanon of Melaina at Phigalia shows how the local cult interpreted her, as goddess of nature. A Medusa type with a horse's head with snaky hair, holding a dove and a dolphin, probably representing her power over air and water.

=== Boeotian myths ===
The myth of Poseidon appearing as a horse and mating with Demeter was not localized in Arcadia. At Haliartos in Boeotia near Thebes Poseidon appears as stallion. He mates with Erinys near the spring of Tilpousa and she gives birth to the faboulous horse Arion. At Tilpusa we have a very old cult of the chthonic deities Erinys and Poseidon. The water-god Poseidon appears as a horse which seems to represent the water-spirit and Erinys is probably the personification of a revenging earth-spirit. From earlier times at Delphi Poseidon was joined in a religious union with the earth-goddess Ge. She is represented as a snake which is a form of the earth-spirit.

In Hesiod's Theogony Poseidon once slept with the monstrous Medusa near the mountain Helikon. She conceived the winged horse Pegasus who sprang out of her body when Perseus cut off her head. Pegasus stuck the ground with his hoof and created the famous spring Hippocrene near Helikon.

Praxidicai were female deities of judicial punishment worshipped in the region of Haliartos in the historical times. Their origin is probably the same with Erinys. Their images depicted only the heads of the goddesses probably a representation of the earth goddess emerging from the ground. Praxidice is an epithet of Persephone in the Orphic Hymns. Persephone is sometimes depicted with her head emerging from the ground.

== Origins ==
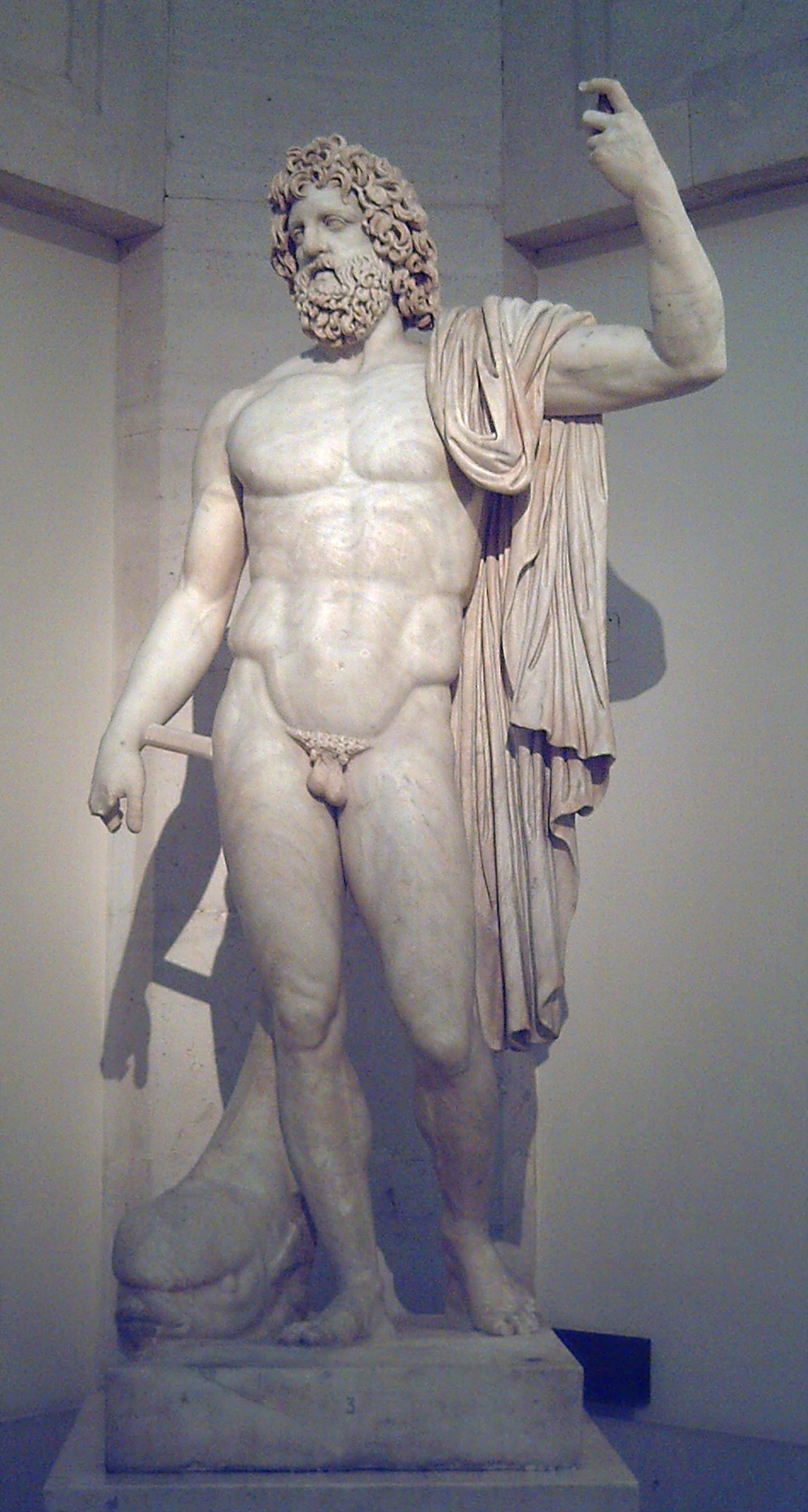
Colossal-type statue of Poseidon-Neptune, probably sculpted in a workshop in Aphrodisias (Asia Minor). It was at Palaemon's sanctuary in Isthmia, where it was described by Pausanias. Prado Museum, Madrid

During the Mycenean period Poseidon was worshipped in several regions in Greece. At Pylos and some other cities he was a god of the underworld (Lord of the Underworld) and his cult was related to the protection of the palace. He carried the title anax, king or protector. His consort potnia, lady or mistress, was the Mycenean goddess of nature. Her main aspects were birth and vegetation. Poseidon had the title "Enesidaon" (earth-shaker) and in Crete he was associated with the goddess of childbirth Eleithyia. Through Homer the Mycenean titles were also used in classical Greece with similar meaning. He was identified with anax and he carried the epithets "Ennosigaios" and "Ennosidas" (earth-shaker). Potnia was a title which accompanied female goddesses. The goddess of nature survived in the Eleusinian cult, where the following words were uttered: "Mighty Potnia bore a strong son". In the heavily sea-dependent Mycenaean culture, there is not sufficient evidence that Poseidon was connected with the sea; it is unclear whether "Posedeia" was a sea-goddess. The Greek invaders came from far inland and they were not familiarized with the sea.

In the primitive Boeotian and Arcadian myths Poseidon, the god of the underworld, appears as a horse and he is mating with the earth goddess. The earth goddess is called Erinys or Demeter and she gives birth to the fabulous horse Arion and the unnamed daughter Despoina. The horse represents the divine spirit (numen) and is related to the liquid element and the underworld. In Greek folklore the horse is associated with the underworld and it was believed that it had the ability to create springs. In the European folklore the water-spirit appears with the shape of a horse or a bull. In Greece the river god Acheloos is represented as a bull or a man-bull. Burkert suggests that the Hellenic cult of Poseidon as a horse god may be connected to the introduction of the horse and war-chariot from Anatolia to Greece around 1600 BC.

In the Boeotian myth, Poseidon is the water-god and Erinys is a goddess of the underworld. She is probably the personification of a revenging earth spirit and it seems that she had a similar function with the goddess Dike (Justice). At the spring "Tilpousa" she gives birth to Arion. In the Arcadian myth Poseidon Hippios (horse) is mating with the mare-Demeter. At Thelpousa Demeter-Erinys gives birth to Arion and to an unnamable daughter who has the shape of a mare. In some neighbour cults the daughter was called Despoina (mistress). The theriomorphic form of gods seems to be local in Arcadia in an old religion associated with xoana.

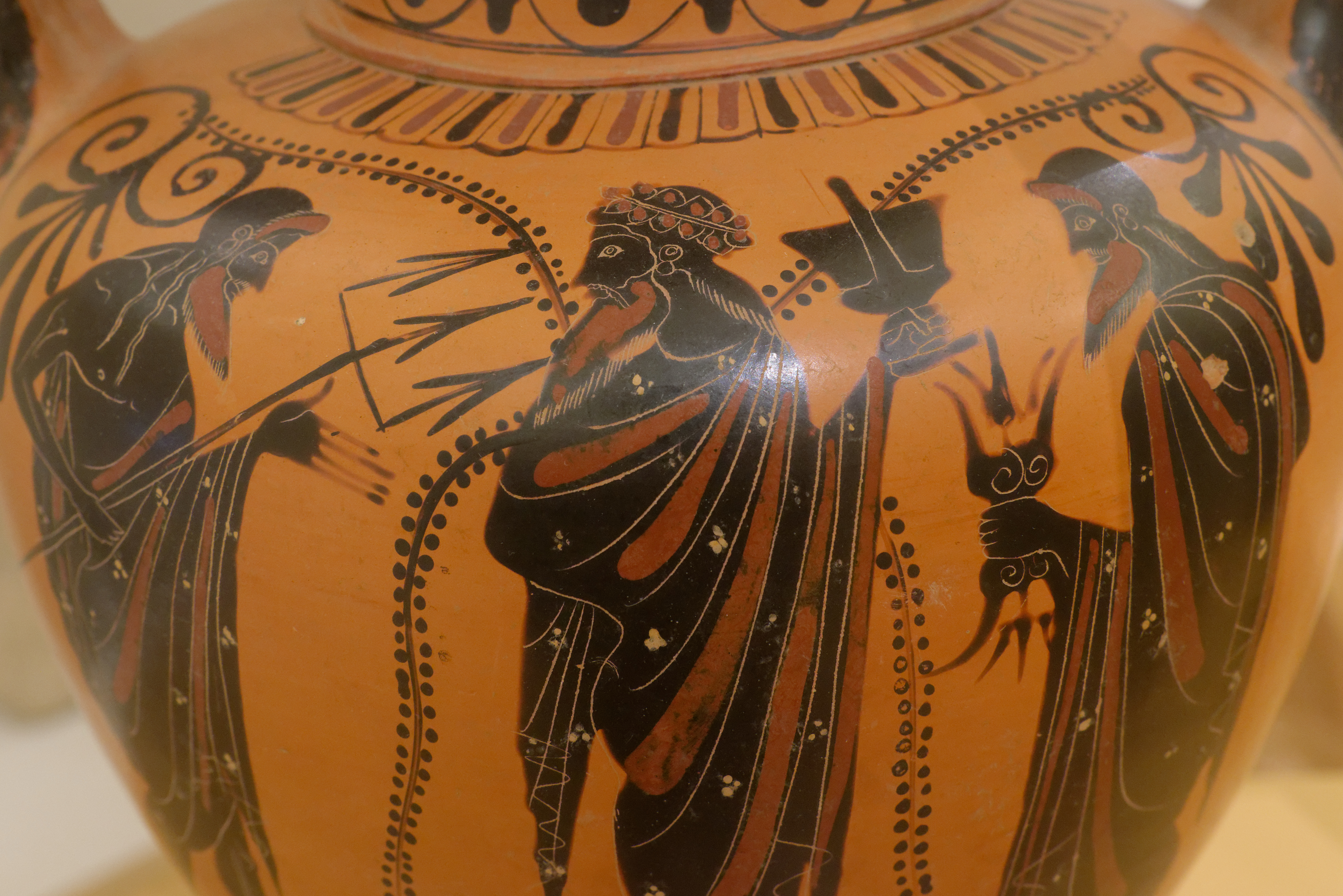
From left to right: Poseidon, Dionysos, Zeus. Black figured neck-amphora, 540 BC. National Museum of Denmark, Copenhagen

According to some theories Poseidon was a Pelasgian god or a god of the Minyans. Traditionally the Minyans are considered Pelasgians and they lived in Thessaly and Boeotia. In Thessaly (Pelasgiotis) there was a close relation to the horses. Poseidon created the first horse Skyphios hitting a rock with his trident and managed in the same way to drain the valley of Tempe. The Thessalians were famous charioteers. Some of the oldest Greek myths appear in Boeotia. In ancient cults Poseidon was worshipped as a horse. The horse Arion was a sire of Poseidon-horse with Erinys and the winged horse Pegasus a sire of Poseidon foaled by Medusa. At Onchestos he had an old famous festival which included horseracing. However it is possible that Poseidon like Zeus was a common god of all Greeks from the beginning.

It is possible that the Greeks did not bring with them other gods except Zeus, Eos, and the Dioskouroi. The Pelasgian god probably represented the fertilising power of water, and then he was considered god of the sea. As the sea encircles and holds the earth in its position, Poseidon is the god who holds the earth and who has the ability to shake the earth. The primeval water who encircled the earth (Oceanus) is the origin of all rivers and springs, who are the children of Oceanus and his wife Tethys.

Farnell suggested that Poseidon was originally the god of the Minyans who occupied Thessaly and Boeotia. There is a similarity between the Boeotian and Arcadian myths and especially between the myths which represent the god of the waters Poseidon as a horse. The mythical horse Arion appears in both regions. The offspring of Poseidon winged horse Pegasus creates famous springs near Helikon and at Troizen. Some springs of Poseidon have similar names in Boeotia and Peloponnese. It is possible that the name of Poseidon Helikonios in Boeotia whose festivities included horseracing derives from the mountain Helikon. The Minyans had trade contacts with Mycenean Pylos and the Achaeans adopted the cult of Poseidon Helikonios. The cult spread in Peloponnese and then to Ionia when the Achaeans migrated to Asia Minor.

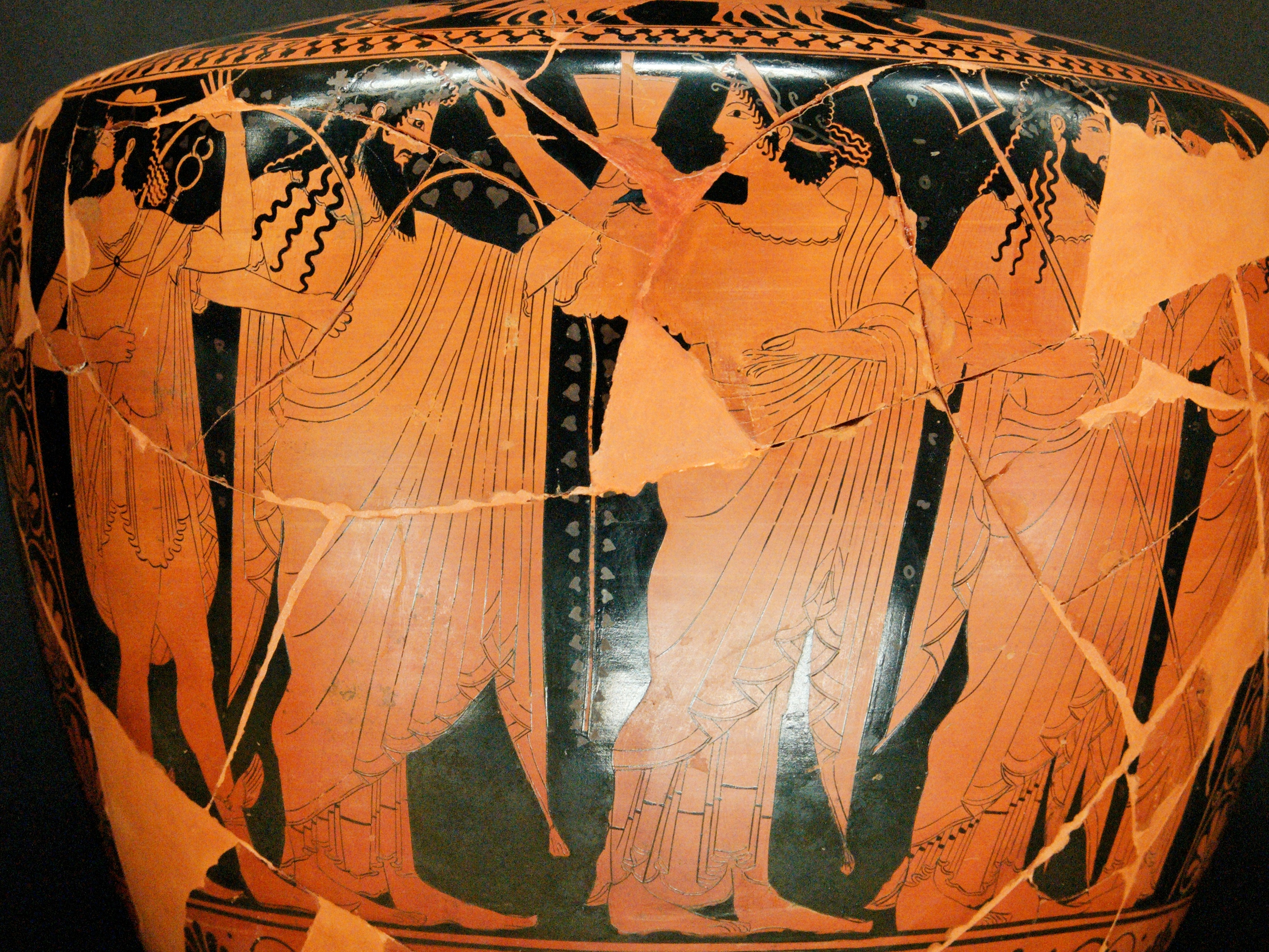
Hermes, Dionysos, Ariadne and Poseidon (Amphitrite is depicted on side B.). Detail from the belly of an Attic red-figure hydria, ca. 510 BC–500 BC. Louvre, Paris

Nilsson suggested that Poseidon was probably a common god of all Greeks from the beginning. The Greeks occupied Thessaly, Boeotia and Peloponnese during the Bronze Age. In all these regions Poseidon was the god of the horses. The origin of his cult was Peloponnese and he was the inland god of the Achaeans, the god of the "horses" and the "earthquakes". When the Achaeans migrated to Ionia there was a transition to regarding Poseidon as the god of the sea because the Ionians were sea-dependent. With no doubt he was originally the god of the waters. The Greeks believed that the cause of the earthquakes was the erosion of the rocks by the waters, by the rivers in Peloponnese which they saw to disappear into the earth and then to burst out again. The god of the waters became the "earth-shaker". This is what the natural philosophers Thales Anaximenes and Aristotle believed and could not be different from the folk belief. In the Greek legends Arethusa and the river Alpheus traversed underground under the sea and reappeared at Ortygia.

In any case, the early importance of Poseidon can still be glimpsed in Homer's Odyssey, where Poseidon rather than Zeus is the major mover of events. In Homer, Poseidon is the master of the sea. He is described as a majestic, scary, and avenging monarch of the sea.

== Cult ==
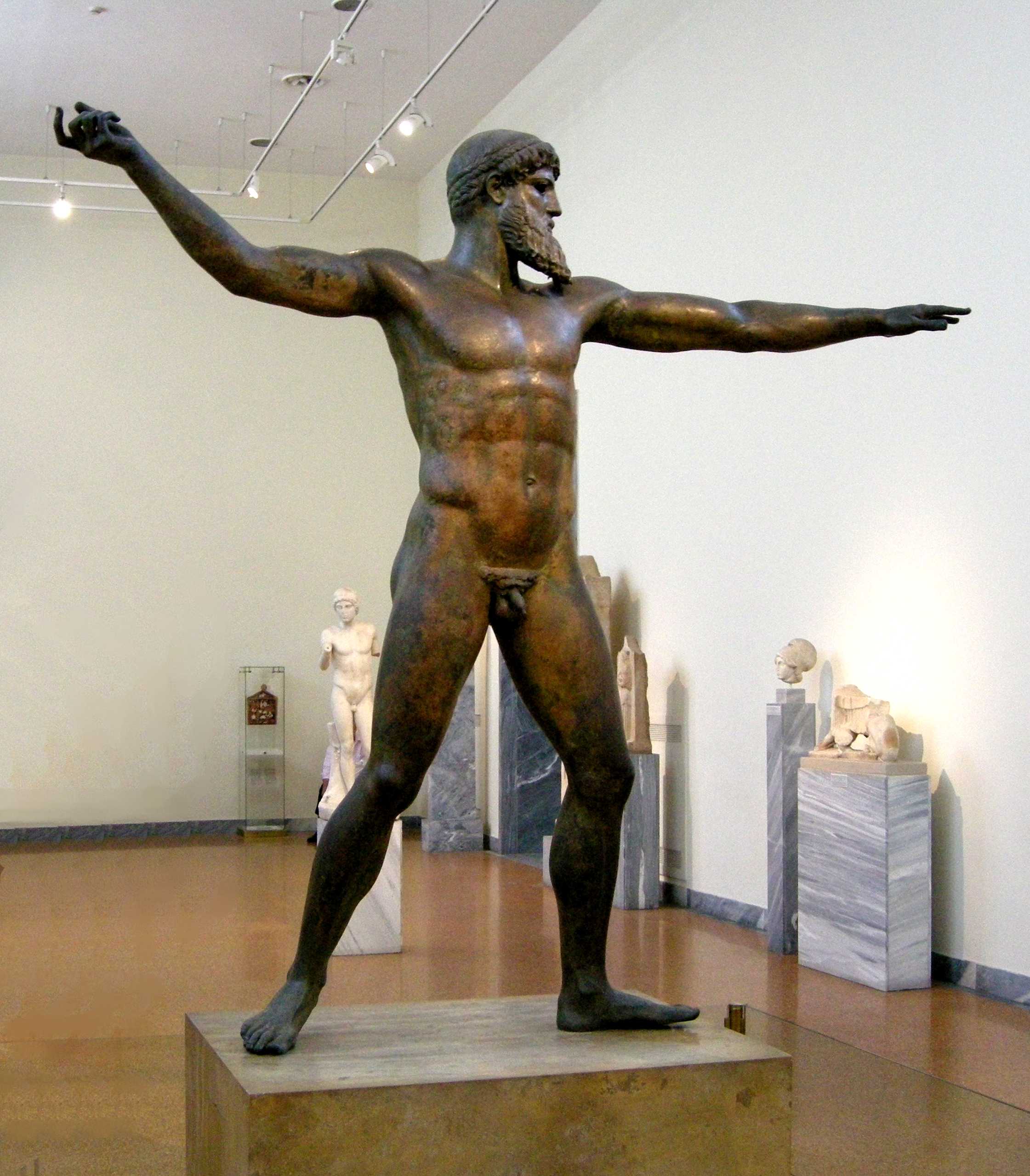
Artemision Bronze, bronze statue probably of Poseidon, Severe style 480-440 BC. The statue was possibly a thank offering to the god after the battle of Artemision (480 BC).National Archaeological Museum Athens.

I begin to sing about Poseidon, the great god,
mover of the earth and fruitless sea
god of the deep who is also lord of Helicon and wide Aegae.
A two-fold office the gods allotted you,
O Shaker of the Earth, to be a tamer of horses
and a saviour of ships!
Hail, Poseidon, Holder of the Earth, dark-haired lord!
O blessed one, be kindly in heart
and help those who voyage in ships!
(Homeric Hymn to Poseidon)

The worship of Poseidon was extended all over Greece and southern Italy, but he was specially honoured in the Peloponnese which is called "the residence of Poseidon" and in the Ionic cities. The significance of his cult is indicated by the names of cities like Poteidaia in the Chalkidiki peninsula and Poseidonia (Paestum), a Greek colony in Italy. Poseidion is a frequent Greek placename along coastlines and the name of a Greek colony at the Syrian coast.

In Ionia his cult was introduced by Achaean colonists from Greece in the 11th century BC. Traditionally the colonists came from Pylos where Poseidon was the principal god of the city. The god had a famous temple near the mountain Mycale. The month Poseidaon is the month of the winter-storms. The name of the month was used in Ionic territories, in Athens, in the islands of the Aegean and in the cities of Asia Minor. At Lesbos and Epidauros the month was called Poseidios. During this month Poseidon was worshipped as the "master of the sea" in a bright cult.

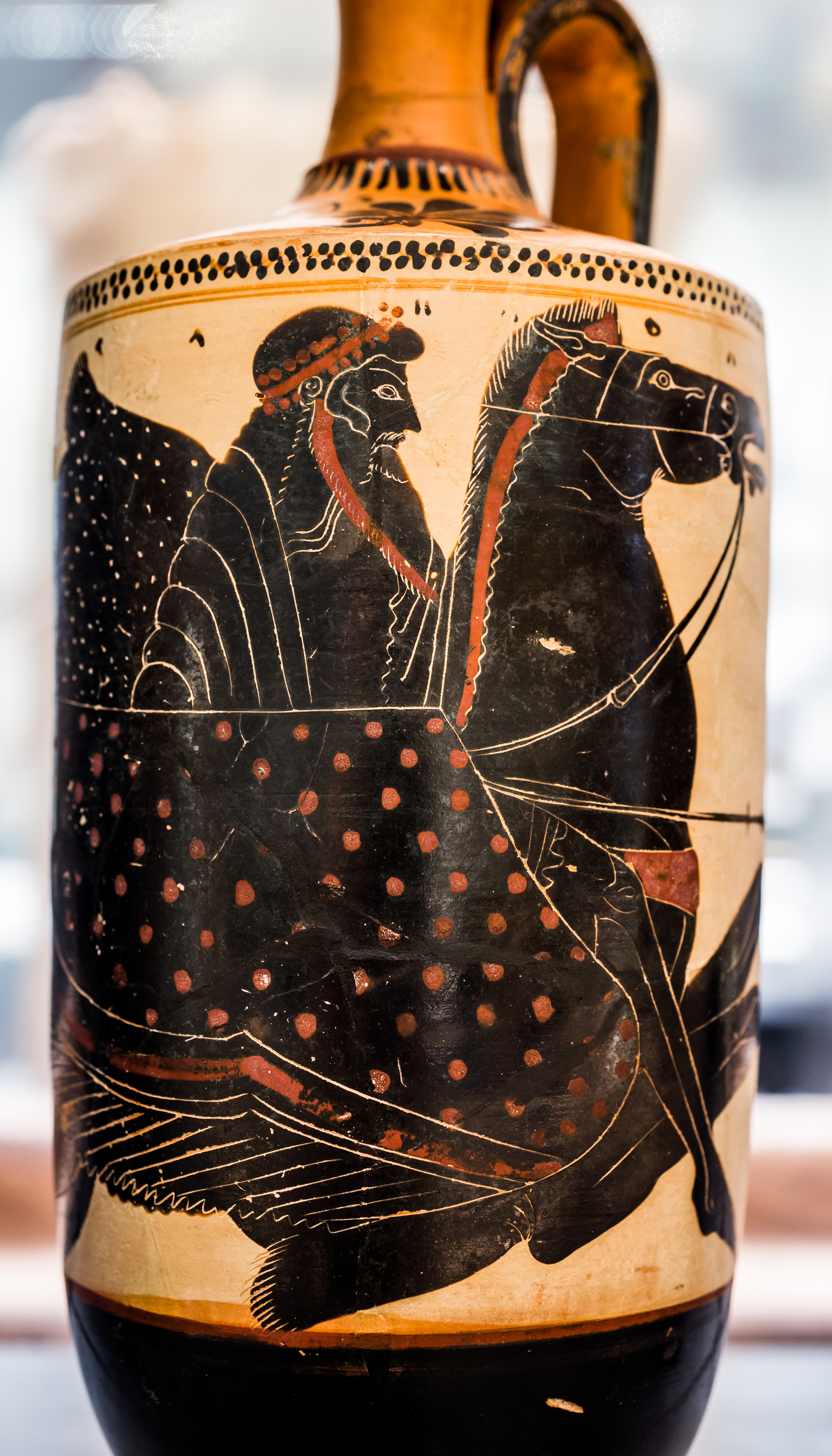
Poseidon with trident on hippocamp (sea-horse). Athenian black-figure white-ground pottery lekythos ca. 500-480 BC, by Athena Painter. Ashmolean Museum, Oxford

Poseidon was a major civic god of several cities: in Athens, he was second only to Athena in importance, while in Corinth and many cities of Ionia and Magna Graecia he was the chief god of the polis. Many fests of Poseidon included athletic competitions and horseracing. In Corinth his cult was related to the Isthmian games. In Arcadia his cult was related to the games "Hippocrateia" and at Sparta he had a temple near an Hippodrome. In Onchestos of Boeotia horseracing was a part of the athletic games in honour of the god.

Poseidon was considered a symbol of unity. The Panionia the festival of all Ionians near Mycale were celebrated in honour of Poseidon Helikonios and was the place of meeting of the Ionian League. He was the patron god of the Amphictiony of Kalaureia. At Onchestos of Boeotia he was worshipped as Poseidon Helikonios. His sanctuary became the place of meeting of the second Boeotian league. At Helike of Achaea there was the famous temple of Poseidon Helikonios, which was the place of meeting of the Achaean League.

The "master of the sea" creates clouds and storms, but he is also the protector of the sailors. He has the ability to calm the sea for a good voyage and save those who are in danger. He was worshipped with the surname "savior" as the protector of the seafarers and the fishermen. He is the "earthshaker", and he is simultaneously the protector against the earthquakes. In some cults he was worshipped as the "bringer of safety" or "protector of the house and the foundations".

The god was considered the creator of the first horse, and it was believed that he taught men the art of taming horses. He was depicted on horseback, or riding in a chariot drawn by two or four horses. He had a lot of temples in Arcadia, with the surname Hippios (of the horse) and he was also transformed into a horse to seduce Demeter.

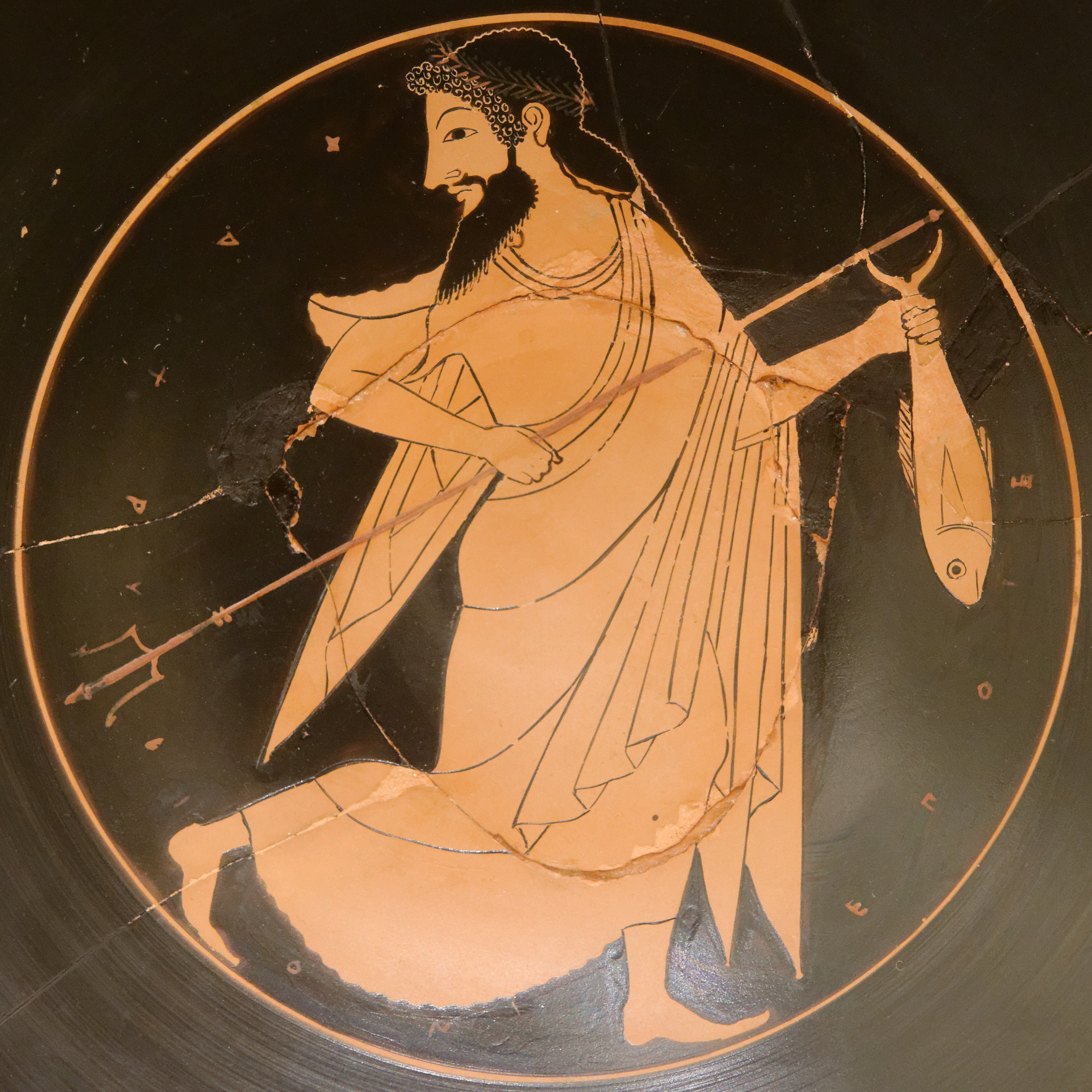
Poseidon with a trident and a fish. Tondo of an Attic red-figured kylix, 520-510 BC, from Etruria.National Museum of Denmark, Copenhagen.

Being the god of waters, Poseidon is related to the primeval water which encircles the earth (Oceanus), who is the father of all rivers and springs. He can create springs with the strike of his trident. He was worshipped as "ruler of the springs" and "leader of the nymphs" In Thessaly it was believed that he drained the area cutting the rocks of Tempe with his trident. In Greek folklore the horse can also create springs.

As god of the sea Poseidon was also god of fishing, and tuna was offered to him by the fishermen during the festal meal for the protection of the nets. The tuna and later the dolphin were both his attribute. He was worshipped in many islands and cities by the coast. At Corcyra a roaring bull near the sea-shore guaranteed a good fishing. The devastating storm of Poseidon is related to fishermen and they poured drink offerings to Poseidon -savior into the sea. The god of inland waters is very close to vegetation and Poseidon was worshipped in many cities as god of vegetation. The Haloa in Athens was a festival of vegetation and the Protrygaia was a celebration in honour of both Dionysus, surnamed Protryges, and Poseidon.

In several cities Poseidon was worshipped in relation to the genealogy and the phratry. At Tinos he was worshipped as a healer-god, probably a forerunner of the famous Evangelistria.

The bull is related to Poseidon mainly in Ionia. The sacrifice of a bull offered to Poseidon is mentioned by Homer in an Ionic festival (Panionia). The sacrifices offered to Poseidon consisted of black and white bulls which were killed or thrown into the sea. Boars and rams were also used and in Argolis horses were thrown into a well as a sacrifice to him.

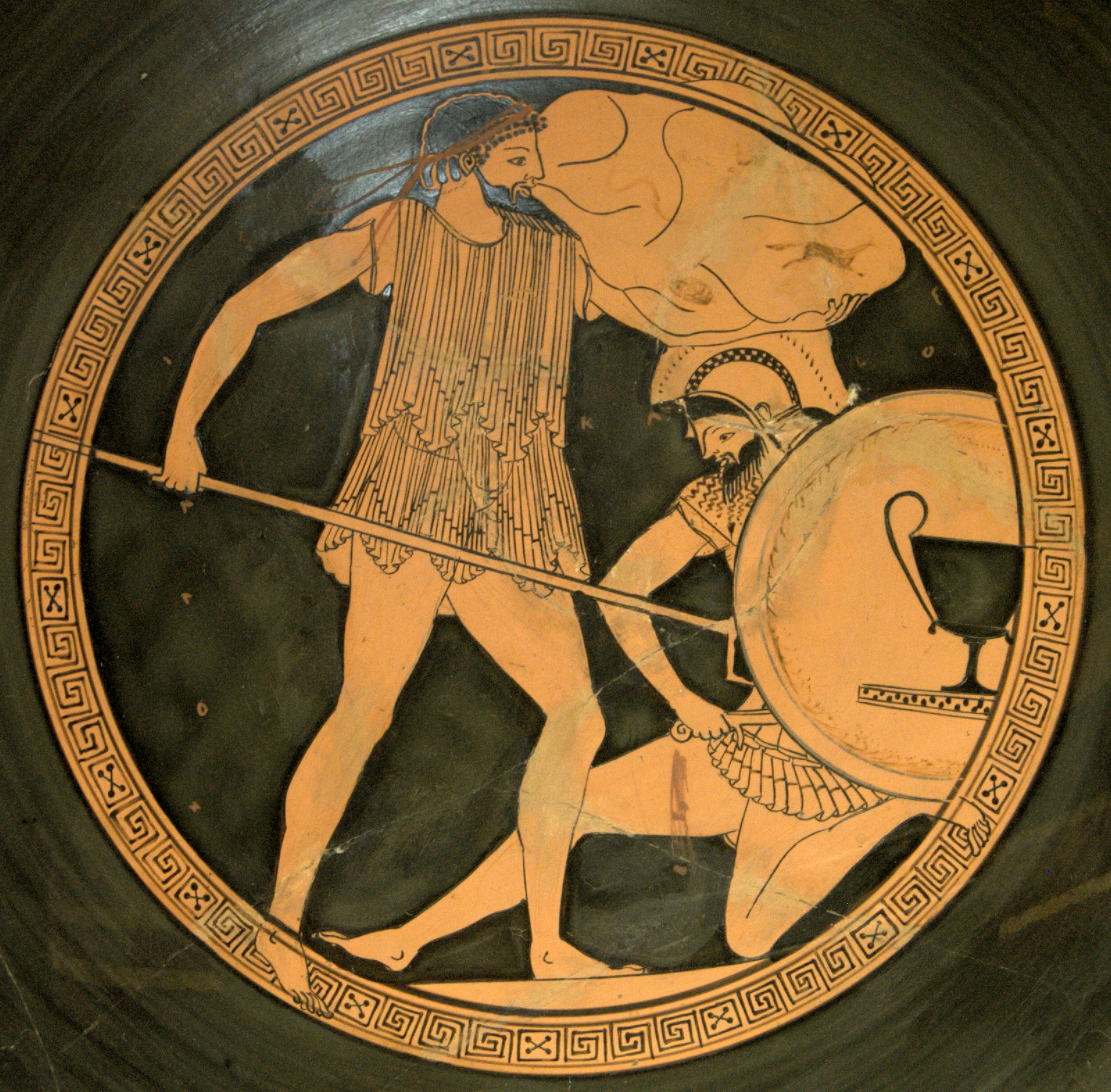
A scene from the Gigantomachy: Poseidon fights Polybotes. The god broke off a piece of the island of Kos called Nisyros, and threw it on top of the giant. Tondo of an Attic red-figure kylix, ca. 475-470 BC. Painter of the Paris Gigantomachy (eponymous vase), circle of the Brygos Painter found in Vulci BnF Museum (Cabinet des médailles), Paris .

In his benign aspect, Poseidon was seen as creating new islands and offering calm seas. When offended or ignored, he supposedly struck the ground with his trident and caused chaotic springs, earthquakes, drownings and shipwrecks. Sailors prayed to Poseidon for a safe voyage, sometimes drowning horses as a sacrifice; in this way, according to a fragmentary papyrus, Alexander the Great paused at the Syrian seashore before the climactic battle of Issus, and resorted to prayers, "invoking Poseidon the sea-god, for whom he ordered a four-horse chariot to be cast into the waves".

According to Pausanias, Poseidon was one of the caretakers of the oracle at Delphi before Olympian Apollo took it over. Apollo and Poseidon worked closely in many realms: in colonization, for example, Delphic Apollo provided the authorization to go out and settle, while Poseidon watched over the colonists on their way, and provided the lustral water for the foundation-sacrifice. At one time Delphi belonged to him in common with Ge, but Apollo gave him the psychopompeion Kalaureia as a compensation for it.

Xenophon's Anabasis describes a group of Spartan soldiers in 400–399 BC singing to Poseidon a paean—a kind of hymn normally sung for Apollo. Like Dionysus, who inflamed the maenads, Poseidon also caused certain forms of mental disturbance. A Hippocratic text of c. 400 BC, On the Sacred Disease, says that he was blamed for certain types of epilepsy.

Poseidon is still worshipped today in modern Hellenic religion, among other Greek gods. The worship of Greek gods has been recognized by the Greek government since 2017.

=== Epithets and attributes ===
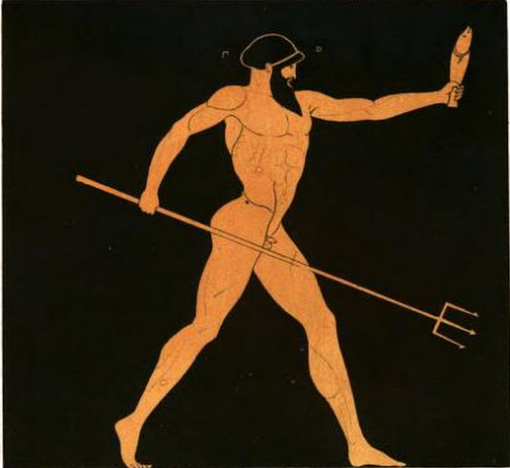
Poseidon Epoptes

Poseidon had a variety of roles, duties and attributes. He is a separate deity from the oldest Greek god of the sea Pontus. In Athens his name is superimposed οn the name of the non-Greek god Erechtheus (Ἑρεχθεύς, Poseidon Erechtheus). In the Iliad, he is the lord of the sea and his golden palace is built in Aegai, in the depth of the sea. His significance is indicated by his titles Eurykreion (Εὐρυκρείων), "wide-ruling", an epithet also applied to Agamemnon and Helikonios anax (Ἑλικώνιος ἄναξ), "lord of Helicon or Helike". In Helike of Achaia he was especially honoured. Anax is identified in Mycenaean Greek (Linear B) as wa-na-ka. Aeschylus uses also the epithet anax and Pindar the epithet Eurymedon (Εὐρυμέδων), "widely ruling".

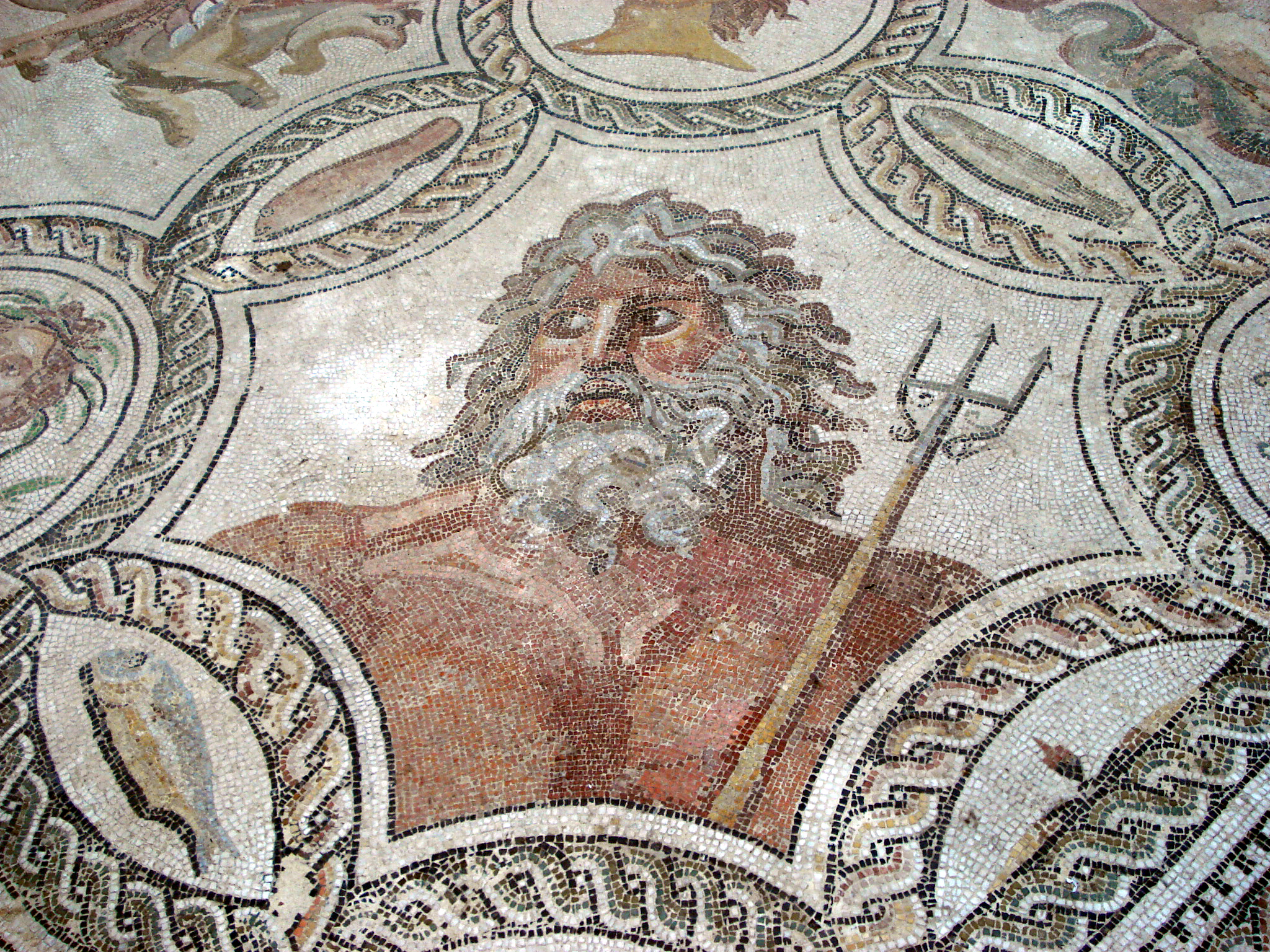
Poseidon- Neptune Detail from the "Mosaic of the Seasons", from the Roman era. Regional Archeological Museum Antonio Salinas, Palermo).

Some of the epithets (or adjectives) applied to him like Enosigaios (Ἐνοσίγαιος), Enosichthon (Ἐνοσίχθων) (Homer) and Ennosidas (Ἐννοσίδας) (Pindar), mean "earth shaker". These epithets indicate his chthonic nature, and have an older evidence of use, as it is identified in Linear B as 𐀁𐀚𐀯𐀅𐀃𐀚, E-ne-si-da-o-ne. Other epithets that relate him with earthquakes are Gaieochos (Γαιήοχος) and Seisichthon (Σεισίχθων). The god who causes the earthquakes is also the protector against them, and he had the epithets Themeliouchos (Θεμελιούχος), "upholding the foundations", Asphaleios (Ἀσφάλειος), "securer, protector", with a temple at Tainaron. Pausanias describes a sanctuary of Poseidon near Sparta beside the shrine of Alcon, where he had the surname Domatites (Δωματίτης), "of the house" He also had the epithet Gaeeochus (Γαιήοχος), meaning "holder of the earth".

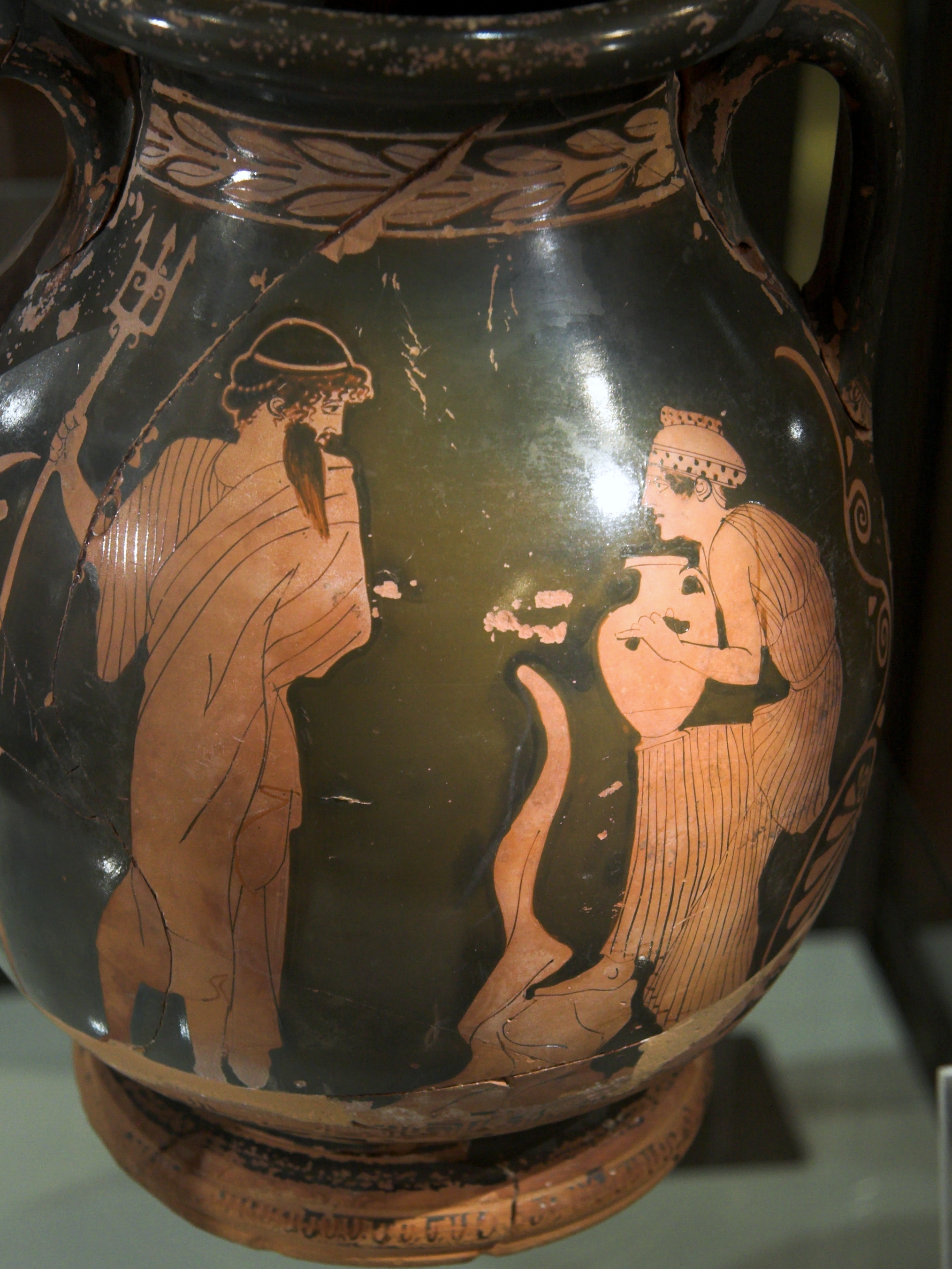
Poseidon surprises Anymone near a spring. Attic pelike in red figure, circle of the Polygnotus Painter, 440-430 BC. Archaeological Museum of Agrigento

Homer uses for Poseidon the title Kyanochaites (Κυανοχαίτης), "dark-haired, dark blue of the sea". Epithets like Pelagios (Πελάγιος) "of the open sea", Aegeus (Αἰγαίος), "of the high sea" in the town of Aegae in Euboea, where he had a magnificent temple upon a hill, Pontomedon (Ποντομέδων)," lord of the sea" (Pindar, Aeschylus) and Kymothales (Κυμοθαλής), "abounding with waves", indicate that Poseidon was regarded as holding sway over the sea. Other epithets that relate him with the sea are, Porthmios (Πόρθμιος), "of strait, narrow sea" at Karpathos, Epactaeus (Ἐπακταῖος) "god worshipped on the coast", in Samos, Alidoupos, (Ἀλίδουπος) "sea resounding". The master of the sea who can cause devastating storms is also the protector of seafarers and he was given the epithet sōtēr (Σωτήρ), "savior".

His symbol is the trident and he has the epithet Eutriaina (Εὐτρίαινα), "with goodly trident" (Pindar). The god of the sea is also the god of fishing, and tuna was his attribute. At Lampsacus they offered fishes to Poseidon and he had the epithet phytalmios (φυτάλμιος) His epithet Phykios (Φύκιος), "god of seaweeds", at Mykonos seems to be related with fishing. He had a festival where women were not allowed, with special offers also to Poseidon Temenites (Τεμενίτης), "related to an official domain ". At the same day they made offers to Demeter Chloe therefore Poseidon was the promotor of vegetation. He had the epithet phytalmios (φυτάλμιος) at Myconos, Troizen, Megara and Rhodes, comparable with Ptorthios (Πτόρθιος) at Chalcis.

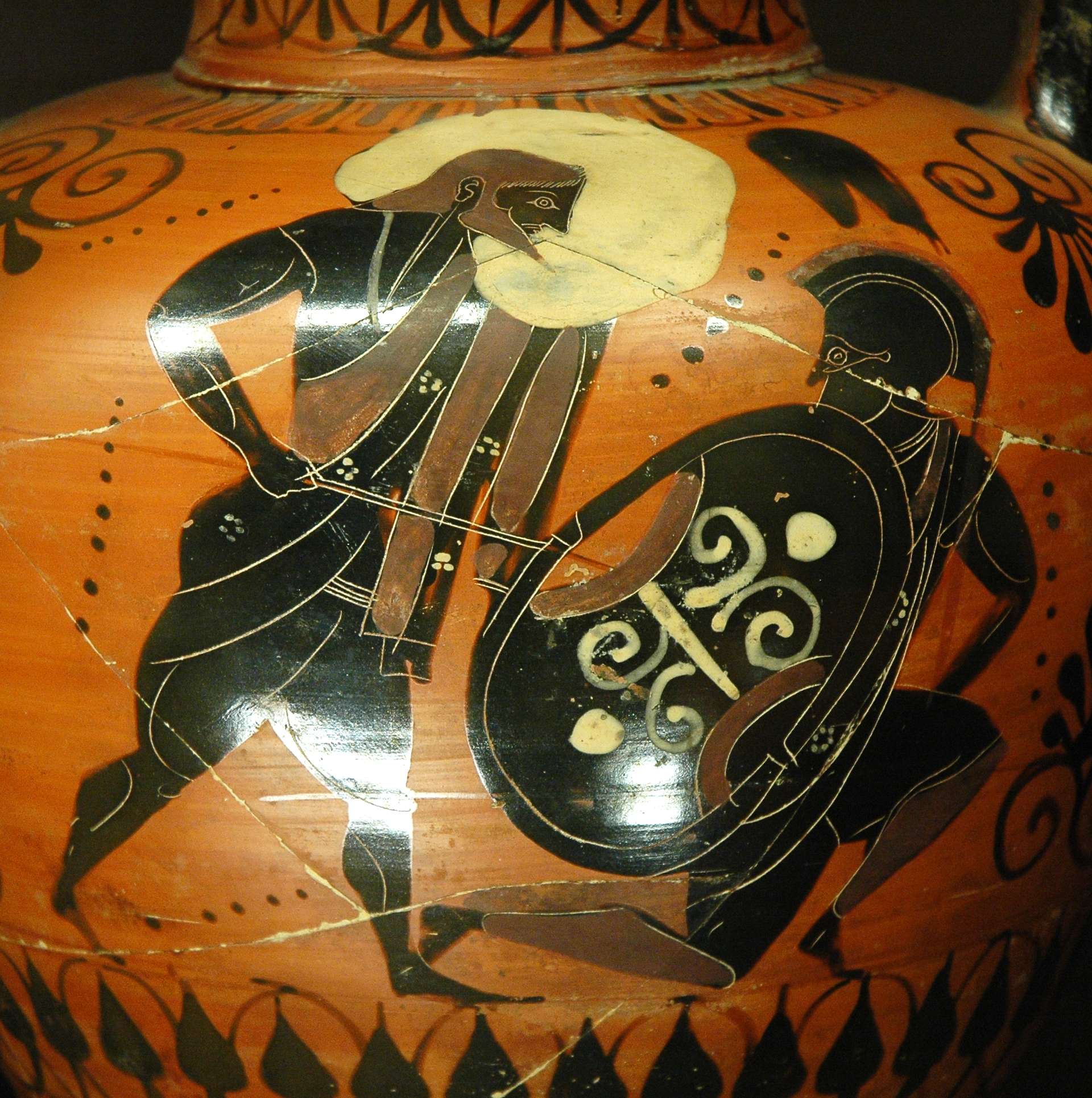
Poseidon fighting the Giant Polybotes. Attic black-figure neck amphora by Swing Painter, 540-530 BC, ca. 540 BC–530 BC. Louvre, Paris.

Poseidon had a close association with horses. He is known under the epithet Hippios (Ἵππειος), "of a horse or horses" usually in Arcadia. He had temples at Lycosura, Mantineia, Methydrium, Pheneos, Pallandion.

At Lycosura he is related with the cult of Despoina. The modern sanctuary near Mantineia was built by Emperor Hadrian. In Athens on the hill of horses there was the altar of Poseidon Hippios and Athena Hippia. The temple of Poseidon was destroyed by Antigonus when he attacked Attica. He is usually the tamer of horses (Damaios, Δαμαίος at Corinth), and the tender of horses Hippokourios (Ἱπποκούριος) at Sparta, where he had a sanctuary near the sanctuary of Artemis Aiginea. In some myths he is the father of horses, either by spilling his seed upon a rock or by mating with a creature who then gave birth to the first horse. In Thessaly he had the title Petraios (Πετραἵος), "of the rocks". He hit a rock and the first horse "Skyphios" appeared. He was closely related with the springs, and with the strike of his trident, he created springs. He had the epithets Krenouchos (Κρηνούχος), "ruling over springs", and nymphagetes (Νυμφαγέτης), "leader of the nymphs" On the Acropolis of Athens he created the saltspring Sea of Erechtheus (Ἐρεχθηίς θάλασσα). Many springs like Hippocrene and Aganippe in Helikon are related with the word horse (hippos). (also Glukippe, Hyperippe). He is the father of Pegasus, whose name is derived from πηγή (pēgē), "spring".

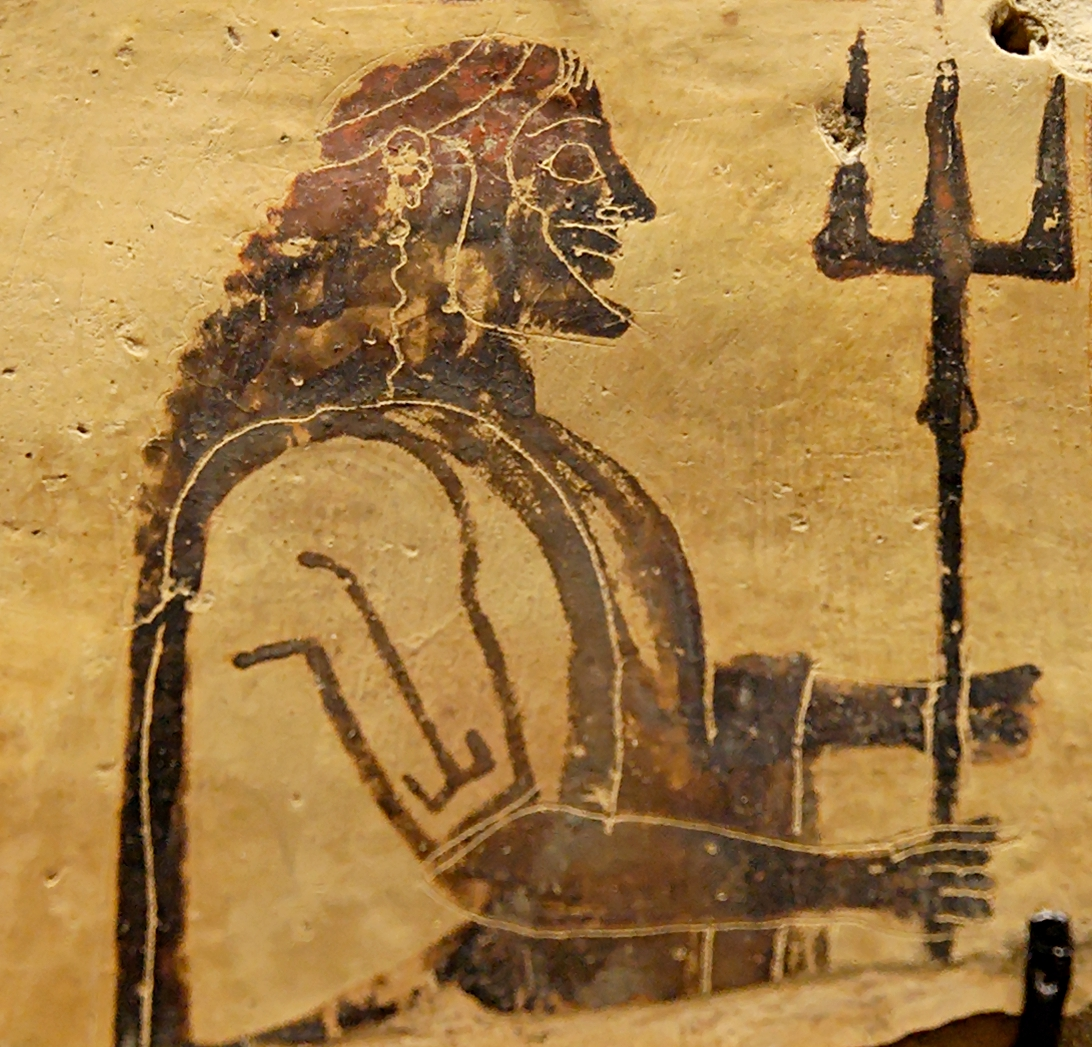
Poseidon carrying a trident. Corinthian plate 550-525 BC, from Pentescouphia, Louvre

Epithets like Genesios Γενέσιος at Lerna Genethlios (Γενέθλιος) "of the race or family" Phratrios (Φράτριος) "of the brotherhood", and Patrigenios (Πατριγένειος) indicate his relation with the genealogy trees and the brotherhood.

Other epithets of Poseidon in local cults are Epoptes (Ἐπόπτης), "overseer, watcher" at Megalopolis, Empylios (Ἐμπύλιος), "at the gate " at Thebes, Kronios (Κρόνιος) (Pindar) and semnos (σεμνός), "august, holy" (Sophocles).

Some of Poseidon's epithets are related to festivals and athletic games including racing. At Corinth the Isthmian games was an athletic and music festival in honour of the god who had the epithet Isthmios (Ἴσθμιος). At Sparta there was the race in Gaiaochō. (ἐν Γαιαόχῳ) Poseidon Gaiēochos (Γαιήοχος) had a temple near the city beside an Hippodrome. At Mantineia and Pallandion in Arcadia the Hippokrateia (Ἱπποκράτεια) were athletic games in honour of Poseidon Hippeios (Ιππειος). At Ephesus there was a fest "Tavria" and he had the epithet Taureios (Tαύρειος), "related with the bull".

=== Festivals ===
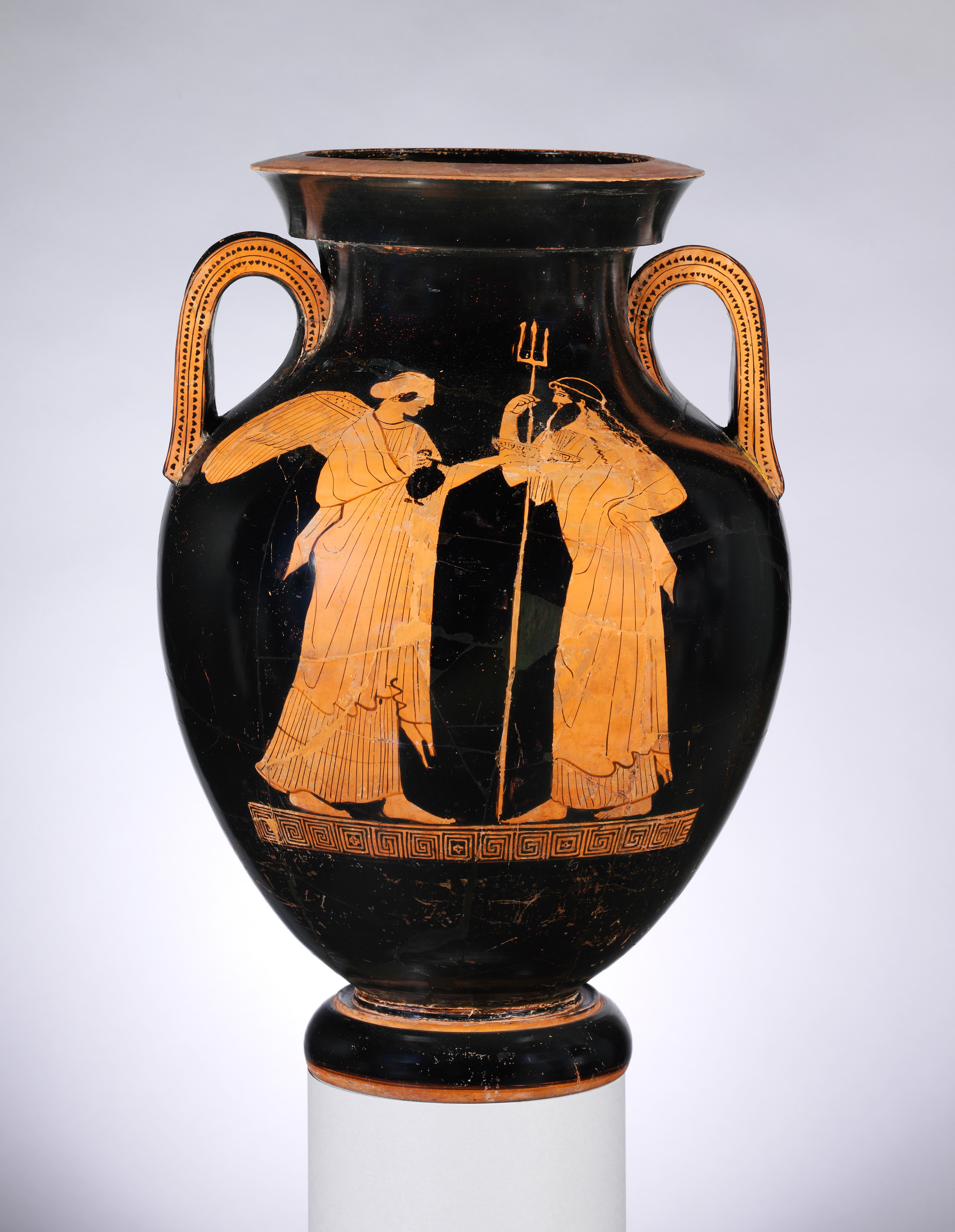
Poseidon and Nike (victory). Terracotta Attic amphora by the Syracuse Painter, one of the last to decorate an amphora, 470-460 BC. Metropolitan Museum of Art, Manhattan, NY

Many festivals all over Greece, in the Ionic cities and in Italy, were celebrated in honour of Poseidon.

- Corinth: The Panhellenic Isthmian Games were celebrated in honour of Poseidon. His sanctuary is to be seen in the context of the position of Corinth controlling the sea. The festival included athletic and musical competitions and horseracing. Traditionally the games were established in the Bronze Age over the dead prince Palaimon.
- Athens: Poseidon had a festival in the month Poseidaon in the Attic calendar. He was worshipped as the "master of the sea".
- Athens: Haloa was a festival of vegetation. The wine-festival Protrygaia belonged to Dionysus and to Poseidon as a god of vegetation.
- Mycale in Ionia: Mycale was a promontory, between Samos and Miletus. The representatives of twelve cities (dodekapolis) celebrated the Panionia (of all the Ionians), a festival of Poseidon Helikonios. Traditionally the first settlers landed in this place. The temple became the meeting place of the Ionian League). Homer describes the sacrifice of a bull to Poseidon, during the festival.
- Ephesus in Ionia. The relation of Poseidon with the bull is stronger in Ionia. The festival Tauria was celebrated in honour of Poseidon Taureios and the capbearers were called tauroi (bulls).
- Kalaureia: Poseidon was the patron god of the Amphictiony of Kalaureia. The festival was celebrated in honour of the god. The famous temple was the meeting place of the representatives of the members (Amphiktiones).
- Tainaron: The famous festival Tainaria was celebrated in honour of Poseidon. The participants were called Tainarioi. The sacred sanctuary of the god was built in a cave in the Tainaron peninsula. A filial cult existed in Sparta.

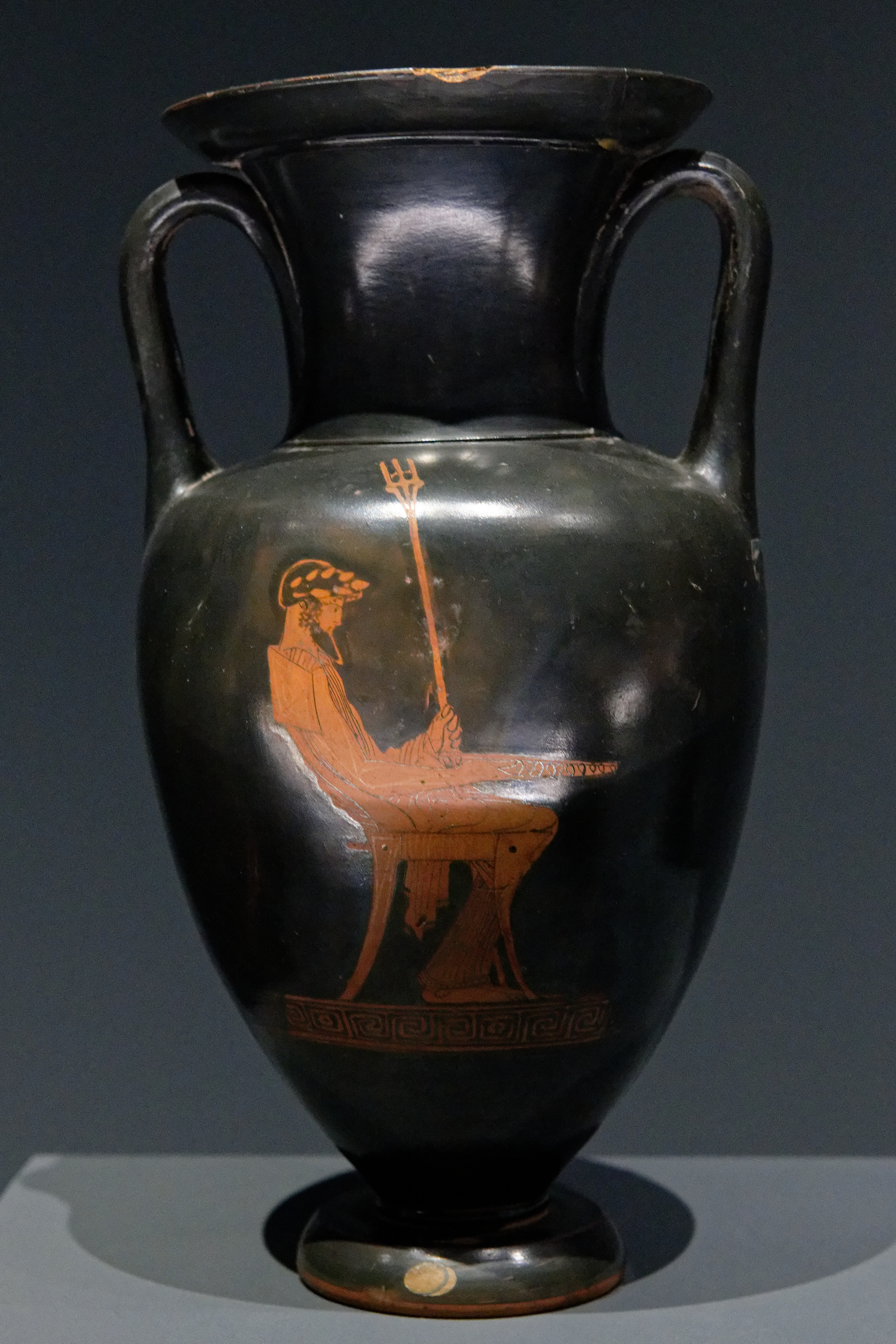
Libation scene: Poseidon seated on a chair, wearing a chiton and a himation, holding a trident and a phiale.450-440 BC red-figure Attic amphora.Louvre

- Onchestos in Boeotia. Poseidon had a famous temple praised by Homer in the Catalogue of Ships, with the surname Helikonios. It became the place of meeting of the second Boeotian league. The peculiar fest included horseracing. At the beginning of the race the charioteers jumped down and made a prayer to Poseidon to protect them if the chariot would fall in the sacred grove.
- Sparta: Poseidon was worshipped with the surname Gaiaochos (carrying the earth or moving under the earth). There was the race Gaiaochoi and the temple was built beside a Hippodrome.
- Helike in Achaea: The city is mentioned in the Catalogue of Ships in Homer's Iliad. The temple and the festival of Poseidon Helikonios was Panhellenic, and was the place of meeting of the Achaean League.The city was destroyed by a tsunami in 370 BC.
- Epidauros: A fest in the month Poseidios was celebrated in honour of Poseidon. He was worshipped as the "master of the sea".
- Helos: The festival Pohoidaia was celebrated in honour of Poseidon. The festival included athletic games and competitions.
- Thuria: The festival Pohoidaia was celebrated in honour of Poseidon. It included athletic games and competitions.

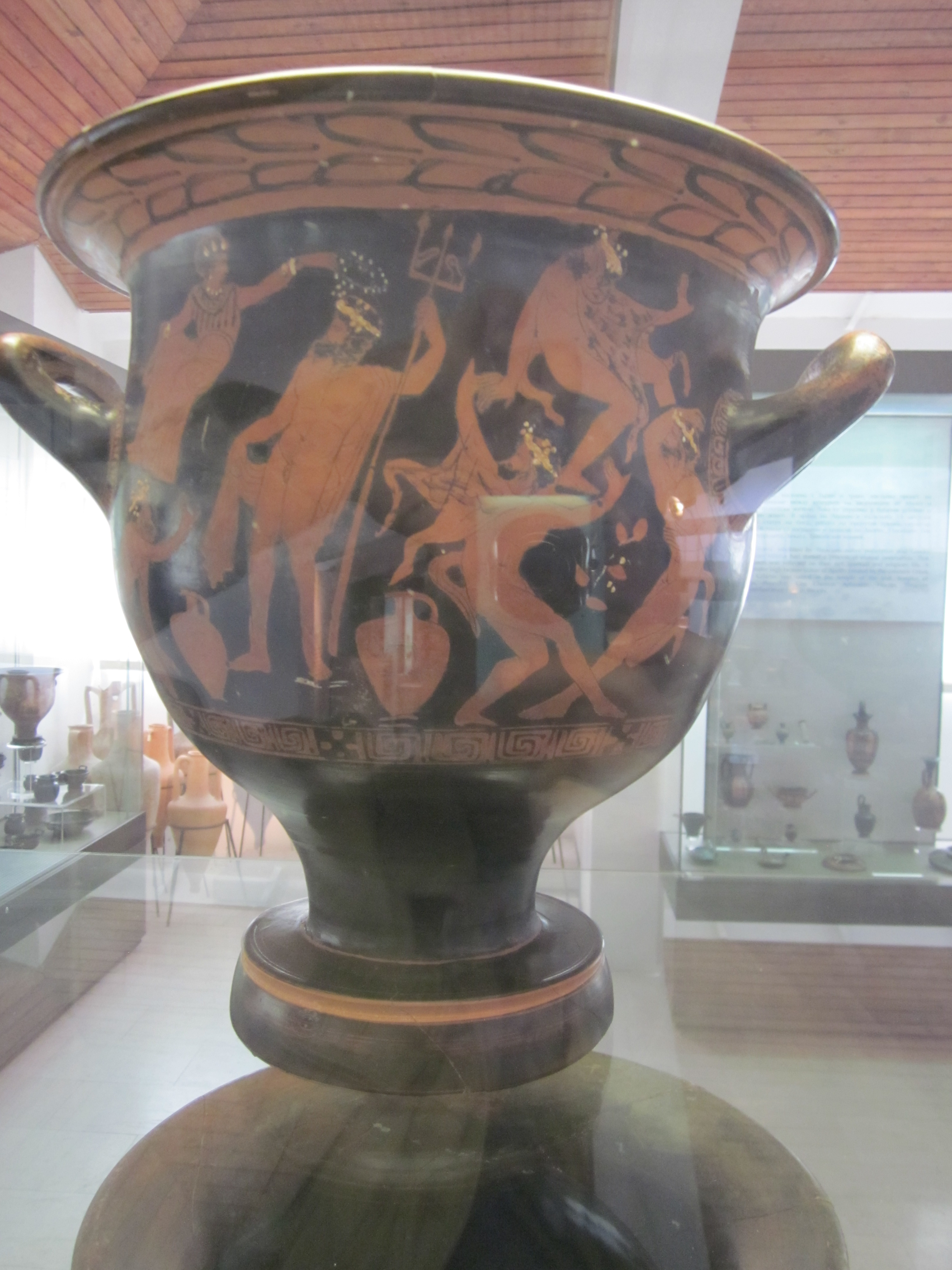
Sozopol Archaeological Museum. Poseidon in the middle.

- Mantineia in Arcadia: Poseidon was worshipped with the surname Hippios (of the horse) and festivities to him were held under the title Hippokrateia, which included athletic games. His temple there was such that entrance into the cella was not allowed.
- Pallandion in Arcadia: Poseidon had the epithet Hippios (of the horse) and the Hippokrateia festival included the holding of athletic games.
- Thronium: Thronium was the chief city of Ancient Locris and is mentioned by Homer in the Catalogue of Ships. The name of a month in the city was Hippios.
- Lesbos: A festival in the month Poseidios was celebrated in honour of Poseidon. He was worshipped as the "master of the sea".
- Myconos: In a festival he was worshipped as a god of fishing and women were not allowed. Chloe (Demeter) received offerings in the same celebration, indicating that Poseidon was also god of vegetation.
- Tinos: A great festival called Poseidonia was celebrated in honour of Poseidon. The temple included great banquet halls, indicating the large number of the participants. Poseidon was worshipped as a healer-god.

== Temples of Poseidon ==
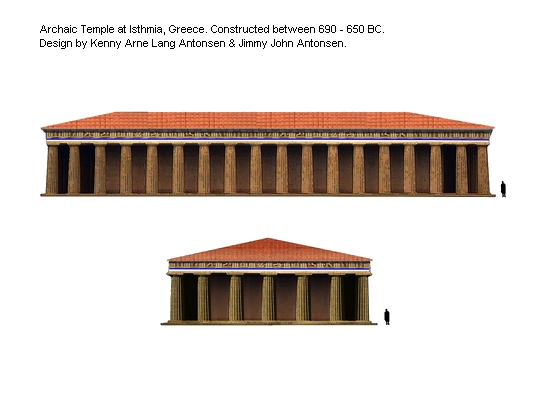
Archaic Temple of Poseidon at Isthmia, Greece (Assumed reconstruction)

The Corinthians are considered to be the inventors of the Doric order. However Corinth was completely destroyed and rebuilt and there is not sufficient evidence for the existence of earliest Doric Greek temples in the city. A building constructed in early 7th century BC c. 690-650 BC at Isthmia near Corinth which was later dedicated to Poseidon, is considered a pioneering building featuring Doric architecture. It seems that the first temple with pure Doric elements was built with the aid of Corinthians at Thermon in Aetolia in the middle of 7th century BC century. c.640-630 BC. It was a peripteral narrow wooden structure dedicated to Apollo, It measured 12.13 X38.23 m at the stylobate and the number of pteron columns was 5X15.

In the earlier temples the peripteral colonnade is treated with a freedom unknown to later Doric architects. This is in part an especially western feature (in Italy) because the hexastyle scheme was adopted as in the temple of Poseidon at Taranto and the second temple of Hera at Paestum (traditionally named temple of Poseidon). In the earlier temples where the number of the columns in the porch is odd, so are the columns of the pteron facade. In such temples the side ptera are approximately the width of one or two intercolumniations. In the hexastyle scheme like the temple of Poseidon at Sounion, there are normally two or four columns in the porch and the side ptera are approximately the width of one intercolumniation. In Doric early work the distance between column and column differs on the fronts and on the flanks and this can be observed in the temple of Poseidon at Kalaureia and in Basilica at Paestum. After the 6th century the rule in Doric is an approximate equality of intercolumniations and it can be observed in the temple of Poseidon at Sounion, where there is a slight difference.

- Isthmia. The temple dedicated later to the god Poseidon was probably built in early 7th century BC c. 690-650 BC in the city Isthmia near Corinth and it had a wooden peristyle. The building was completely destroyed in 470 BC and it seems that it was one of the pioneering buildings featuring Doric architecture. The ground plan showed a temple that was of epic proportions for its time and of a layout that was almost entirely new, however there was no evidence for the employment of the Doric style as it was suggested

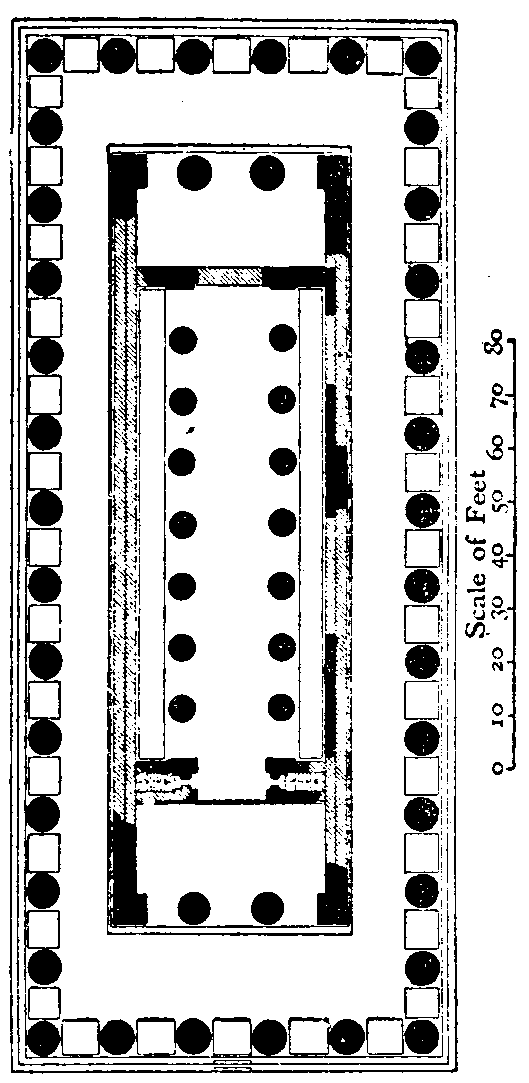
Plan of the second temple of Hera, Paestum (traditionally temple of Poseidon)

- Paestum, on the west coast of Italy near Naples. The Greek name of the city was Poseidonia. The Doric temple was built in the early 6th century BC and it was believed that it was a temple of Poseidon. Traditionally this name is associated with the 5th century BC temple at Paestum, however recent excavations indicate that both temples were dedicated to Hera. The so-called Basilica measured 24,5 X54,3 m at the stylobate and the number of pteron columns was 9x18. The temple is wider than most Greek temples it had two doors. This may indicate a dual dedication of the temple.
- A Doric temple the so-called temple of Poseidon was built in the first half of the 5th century BC and is usually placed later than Parthenon. The temple measured 24,3 X 60,00 m at the stylobate. It was an hexastyle structure and the number of pteron columns was 6X14. The temple was also used to worship Zeus and another deity, whose identity is unknown.

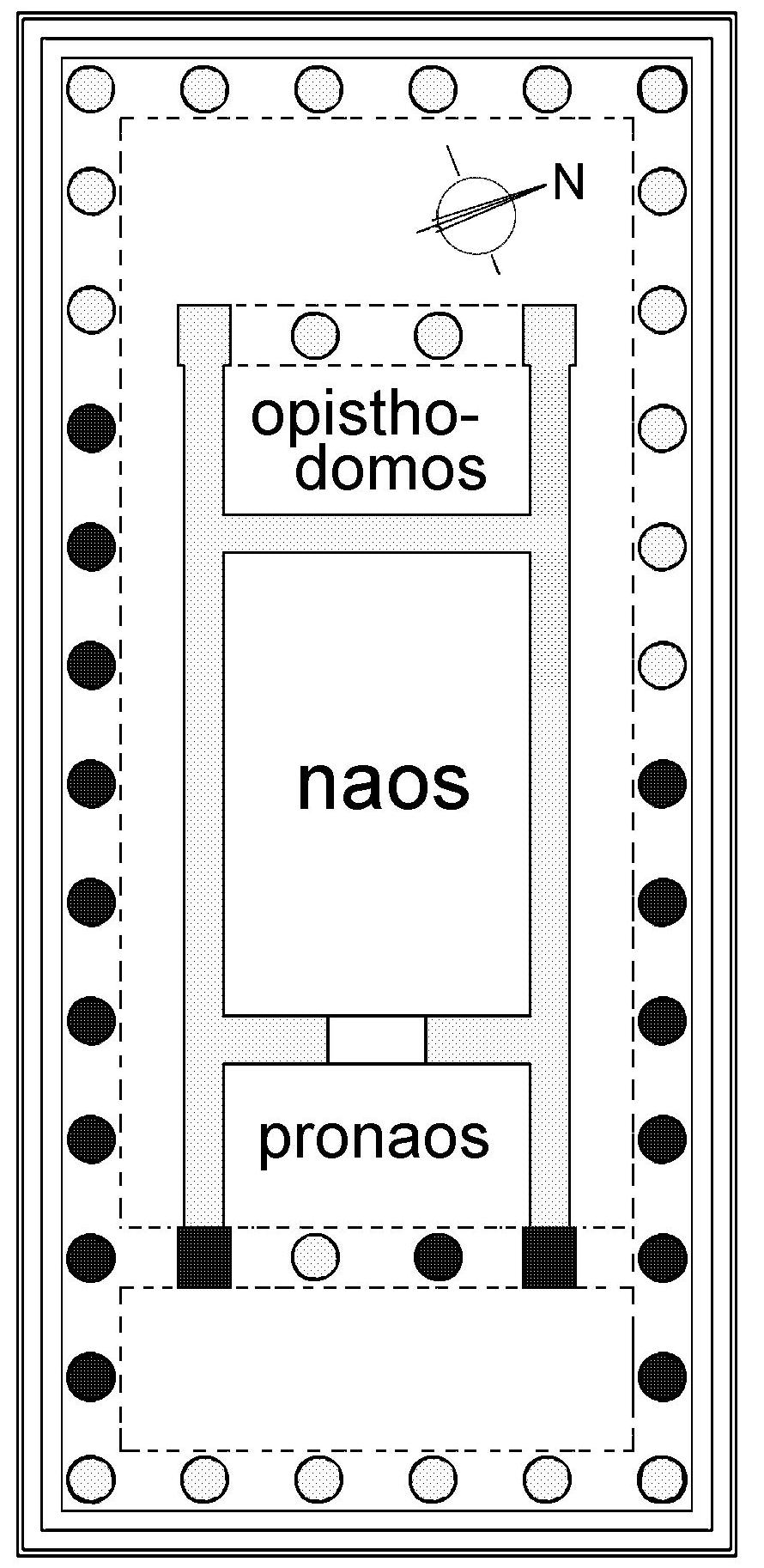
Sounionplan-Temple of Poseidon

- Taranto, a city of Magna Graecia in Italy. Τhe temple of Poseidon was a perpiteral Doric temple, however its exact plan cannot be outlined. It was probably built in the 6th century BC and it seems that the number of pteron columns was 6X13. The interval of the remaining columns is 3.72 m, indicating that the maximum dimensions of the temple at the stylobate could be 22,32X 47,46 m.
- Sounion in Attica. The first temple of Poseidon (formerly called temple of Athena) was built in 490 BC and it was destroyed by the Persians before completion. It measured 13,12 X30,34 m at the stylobate and the number of pteron columns was 6X13. There is a slight difference between the front and back intercolumniations and those of the flanks. There was probably a double row of inner columns. (close wall, engaged). The cella with porches and adyta measured c.9.00 X21,20m
- The second temple was built in 425 BC and it was modelled on its predecessor. It measured 13.48 X 31.15 m at the stylobate and the number of pteron columns was 6X13. An Ionic frieze carried across pteron and continued round interior of each end of pteron. The cella with porches and adyta measured c.9.00 X21,20m. The temple probably contained, at one end facing the entrance, a colossal, bronze statue of Poseidon.

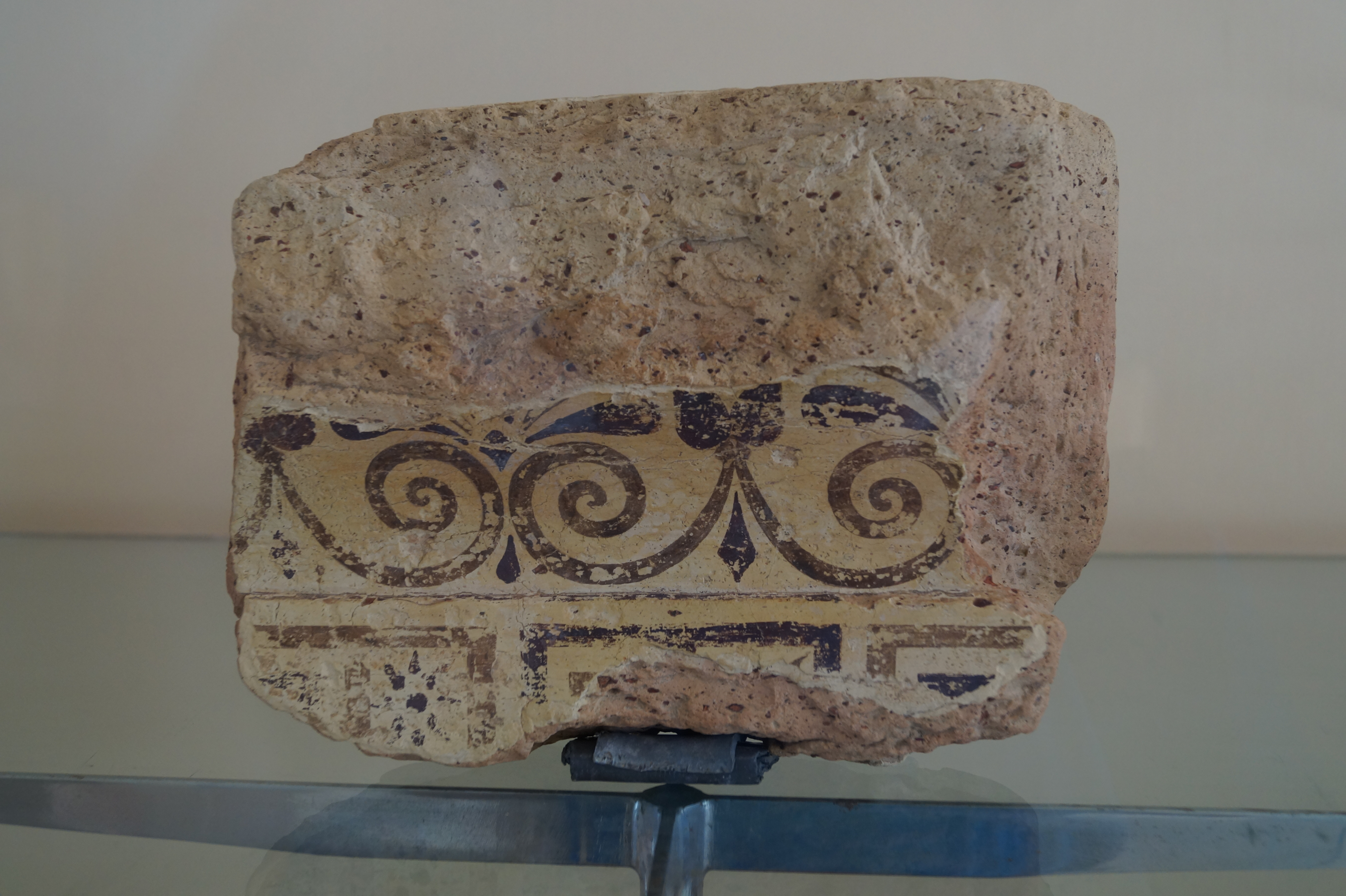
Architectural Terracotta Sanctuary of Poseidon Kalaureia

- Kalaureia, an island close to the coast of Troezen in the Peloponnese, part of the modern island-pair Poros. Early roof tiles from c.650 BC suggest the existence of a precursor to the Late Archaic temple of Poseidon. This Doric temple was probably built in the middle of the 6th century BC, constructed mainly of poros stone. It measured 14,50 X27,00 m at the stylobate and the number of the pteron columns was 6X12. Both front and back intercolumniations were wider than those on the flanks. The building was surrounded by a low wall with the main entrance on the east side.

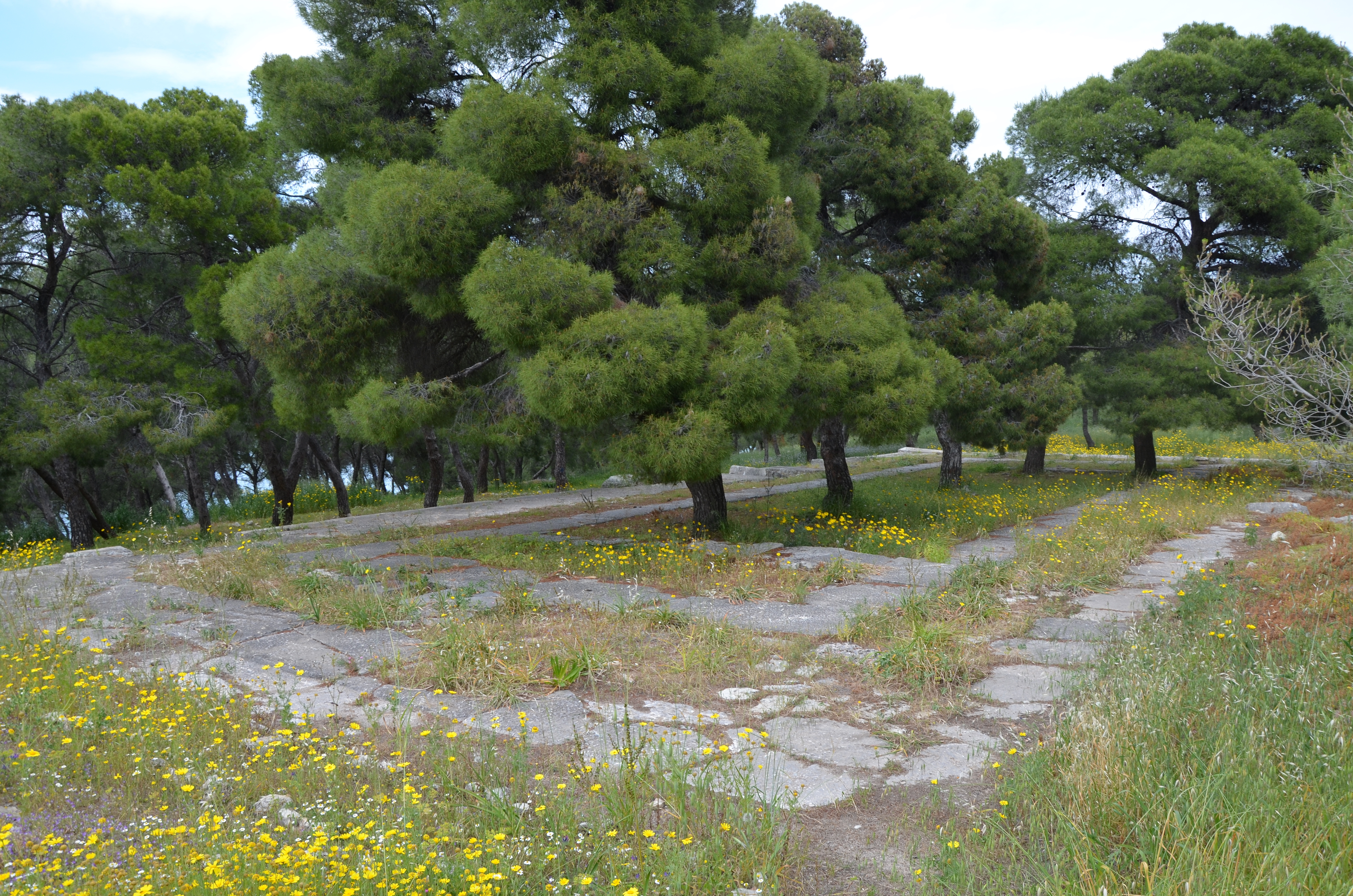
Temple of Poseidon, Hermione

- Hermione in Argolis. The most remarkable temple in the time of Pausanias was the temple of Poseidon. The temple was built in the Late archaic-Early classical period, in the late 6th century BC. It was completely destroyed and its foundations at the peninsula of Bisti (Poseidio) indicate that the temple measured approximately 15,00 X30,00 m at the stylobate.
- Tainaron.The sacred sanctuary of Poseidon was built in a cave at the Tainaron peninsula. The path to the interior, carved into the rock, was preparing him who wanted to get into the psychopompeion. It also functioned as a necromancy and oneiromancy temple. The temple was also established as a place for persecuted who fled there for protection.
- Tinos, an island of Cyclades. The temple of Poseidon and Amphitrite was built near a beach of the island, in the 4th century BC during the Hellenistic period. It was a peripteral Doric temple, which was reconstructed in the 3rd century BC. The temple was made of local marble and had some representations of the god's symbols, such as dolphins and the trident.

== Mythology ==
=== Birth ===
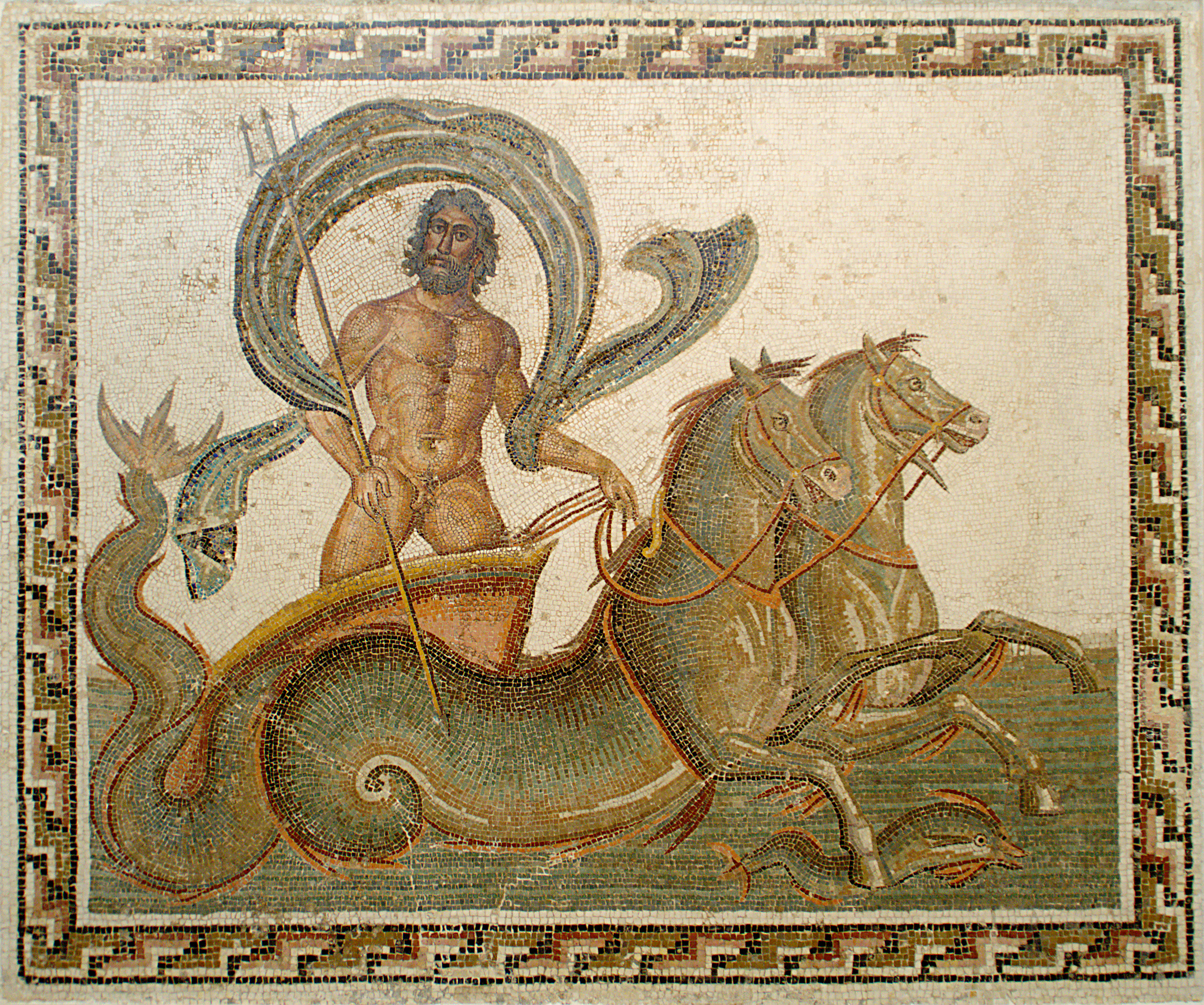
Poseidon-Neptune and triumphal chariot with a pair of sea-horses (Hippocamps). Mosaic, 3rd century. Sousse Archaeological Museum, Medina, Tunesia

In the standard version, Poseidon was born to the Titans Cronus and Rhea, the fifth child out of six, born after Hestia, Demeter, Hera and Hades in that order. Because Poseidon's father was afraid that one of his children would overthrow him like he had done to his own father, Cronus devoured each infant as soon as they were born. Poseidon was the last one to suffer this fate before Rhea decided to deceive Cronus and whisk the sixth child, Zeus, away to safety, after offering Cronus a rock wrapped in a blanket to eat. Once Zeus was grown, he gave his father a powerful emetic that made him gorge up the children he had eaten. The five children emerged from their father's belly in reverse order, making Poseidon both the second youngest child and the second oldest at the same time. Armed with a trident forged for him by the Cyclopes, Poseidon with his siblings and other divine allies defeated the Titans and became rulers in their place. According to Homer and Apollodorus, Zeus, Poseidon and the third brother Hades then divided the world between them by drawing lots; Zeus was allotted the sky, Poseidon the sea, and Hades the Underworld.

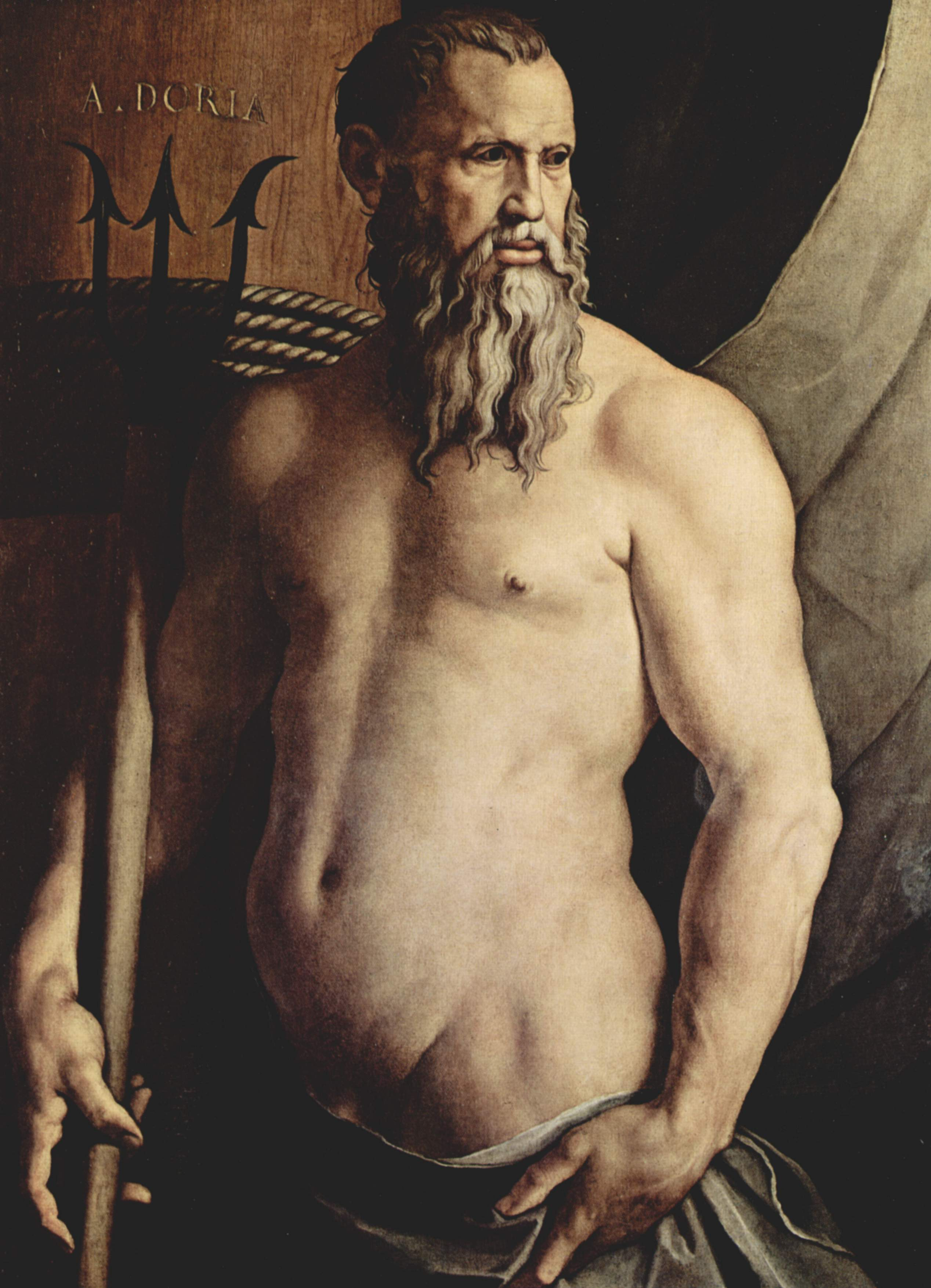
Andrea Doria as Neptune, by Angelo Bronzino .1540-1530, Pinacoteca di Brera, Milan

In a rarer - and later- version, Poseidon avoided being devoured by his father as his mother Rhea saved him in the same manner she did Zeus, by offering Cronus a foal instead, claiming she had given birth to a horse instead of a god, while she had actually laid the child in a flock. Rhea entrusted her infant to a spring nymph. When Cronus demanded the child, the nymph Sinoessa denied having him, and she was thus called Arne afterwards (which bears resemblance to the Greek word for "deny").

In another tale, Rhea gave Poseidon to the Telchines, ancient inhabitants of the island of Rhodes; Capheira, an Oceanid nymph, became the young god's nurse. As Poseidon grew, he fell in love with Halia, the beautiful sister of the Telchines, and fathered six sons and one daughter, Rhodos, with her. By that time Aphrodite, the goddess of love, had been born and risen from the sea, and attempted to make a stop at Rhodes on her way to Cyprus. Poseidon and Halia's sons denied her hospitality, so Aphrodite cursed them to fall in love and rape Halia. After they had done so, Poseidon made them sink below the sea.

In both Homer's Iliad and Odyssey, Poseidon has a palace beneath the sea at a site called Aegae.

=== Minor myths ===
Poseidon broke off a piece of the island of Kos called Nisyros, and threw it on top of Polybotes (Strabo also relates the story of Polybotes buried under Nisyros but adds that some say Polybotes lies under Kos instead).

=== City patronage ===
==== Foundation of Athens ====
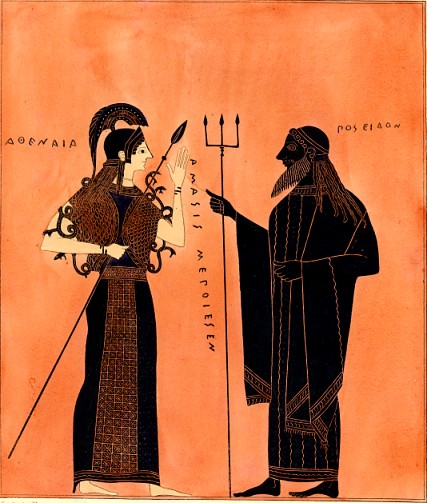
Poseidon (right) and Athena (identified with inscriptions). Black-figure vaise painting by Amasis Painter, 540 BC. BnF Museum (Cabinet des médailles), Paris

Athena became the patron goddess of the city of Athens after a competition with Poseidon. Yet Poseidon remained a numinous presence on the Acropolis in the form of his surrogate, Erechtheus. At the dissolution festival at the end of the year in the Athenian calendar, the Skira, the priests of Athena and the priest of Poseidon would process under canopies to Eleusis.

They agreed that each would give the Athenians one gift and the Athenians would choose whichever gift they preferred. Poseidon struck the ground with his trident and a spring sprang up; the water was salty and not very useful, but represented his true gift - the access to trade. Athens at its height was a significant sea power, defeating the Persian fleet at the Battle of Salamis.

For her part, Athena offered an olive tree. The Athenians or their king, Cecrops, accepted the olive tree and along with it Athena as their patron, for the olive tree brought wood, oil and food. After the dispute, infuriated at his loss, Poseidon sent a monstrous flood to the Attic Plain, to punish the Athenians for not choosing him. The depression made by Poseidon's trident and filled with salt water was surrounded by the northern hall of the Erechtheum, remaining open to the air.

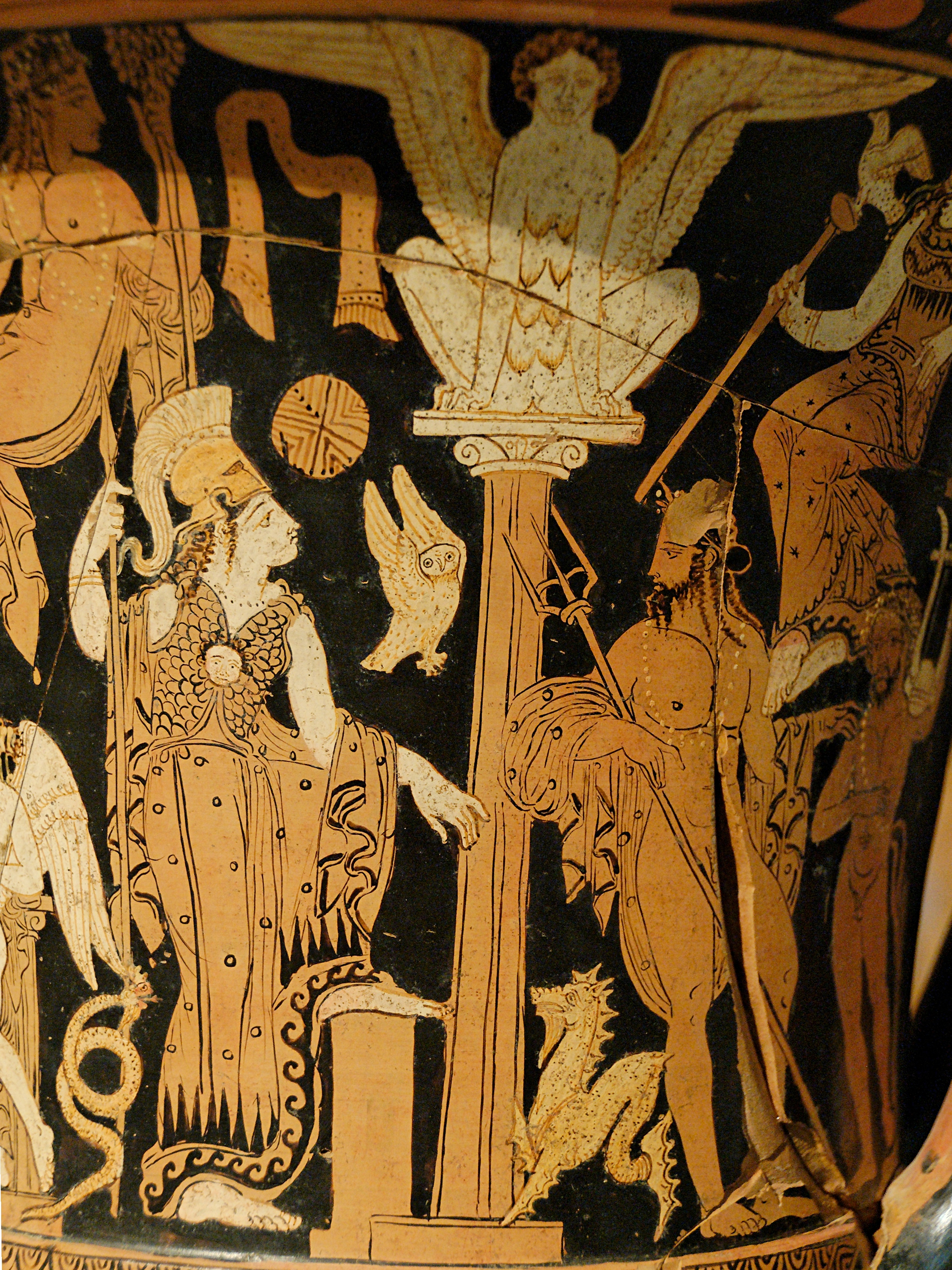
Athena and Poseidon, Faliscan red-figure volute-krater, by Nazzano Painter, 360 BC. Louvre, Paris.

Burkert noted:"In cult, Poseidon was identified with Erechtheus" and "the myth turns this into a temporal-causal sequence: in his anger at losing, Poseidon led his son Eumolpus against Athens and killed Erectheus."

It was also said that Poseidon in his anger over his defeat sent one of his sons, Halirrhothius, to cut down Athena's tree gift. But as Halirrhothius swung his axe, he missed his aim and it fell on himself, killing him instantly. Poseidon in fury accused Ares of murder, and the matter was eventually settled on the Areopagus ("hill of Ares") in favour of Ares, which was thereafter named after the event. In other versions, Halirrhothius raped Alcippe, Ares's daughter, so Ares slew him. Poseidon was enraged over the murder of his son, and Ares was thus held in hold, which eventually acquitted him.

The contest of Athena and Poseidon was the subject of the reliefs on the western pediment of the Parthenon, the first sight that greeted the arriving visitor.

==== Others ====
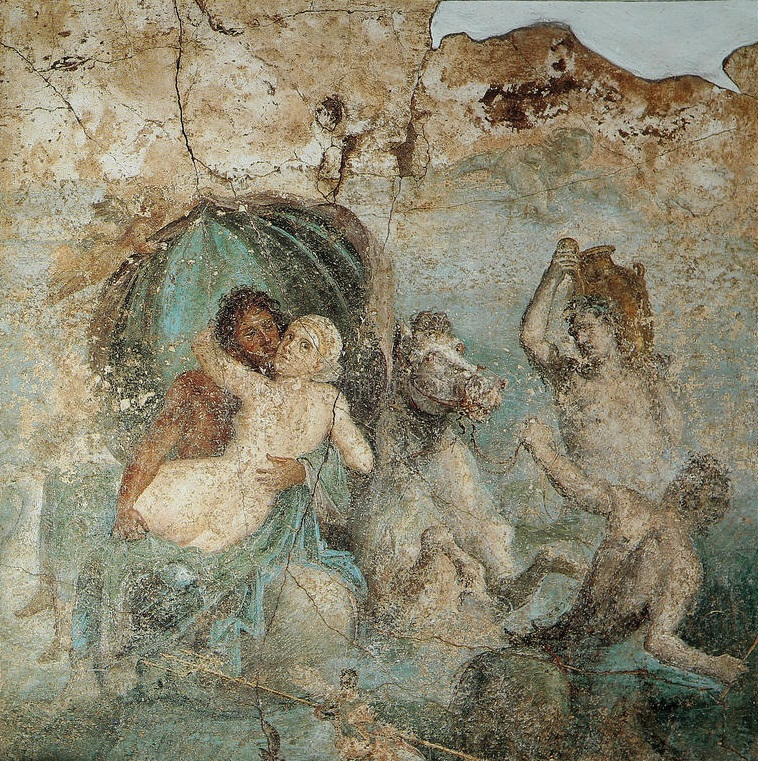
Poseidon and Amymone, fresco in Stabiae, Italy, 1st century AD

The Corinthians had a similar story to the foundations of Athens, about their own city Corinth. According to the myth, Helios and Poseidon clashed, both desiring to make the city their own. Their dispute was brought to one of the Hecatoncheires, Briareus, an elder god, who was thus tasked to settle the fight between the two gods. Briareus decided to award the Acrocorinth to Helios, while to Poseidon he gave the isthmus of Corinth. In this tale, Helios and Poseidon are supposed to represent fire versus water. Helios, as the sun god, received the area that is closest to the sky, while Poseidon, who is the sea god, got the isthmus by the sea.

At another time, Poseidon came to an agreement with the goddess Leto that he would give her the island of Delos, the birthplace of her twins Artemis and Apollo, in exchange for the island of Calauria; he also exchanged Delphi for Taenarum with Apollo. A temple of Poseidon stood at Calauria during ancient times.

Poseidon came to dispute with his sister Hera over the city of Argos. A local king was chosen to settle the matter, Phoroneus, and he decided to award the city to Hera, who then became its patron goddess. Poseidon was enraged, and sent a drought to plague the city. One day, as an Argive woman named Amymone went out in search of water, came upon a satyr who tried to rape her. Amymone prayed to Poseidon for help, and he scared the satyr away with his trident. After Poseidon rescued Amymone from the lecherous satyr he fathered a child on her, Nauplius.

=== Theseus ===
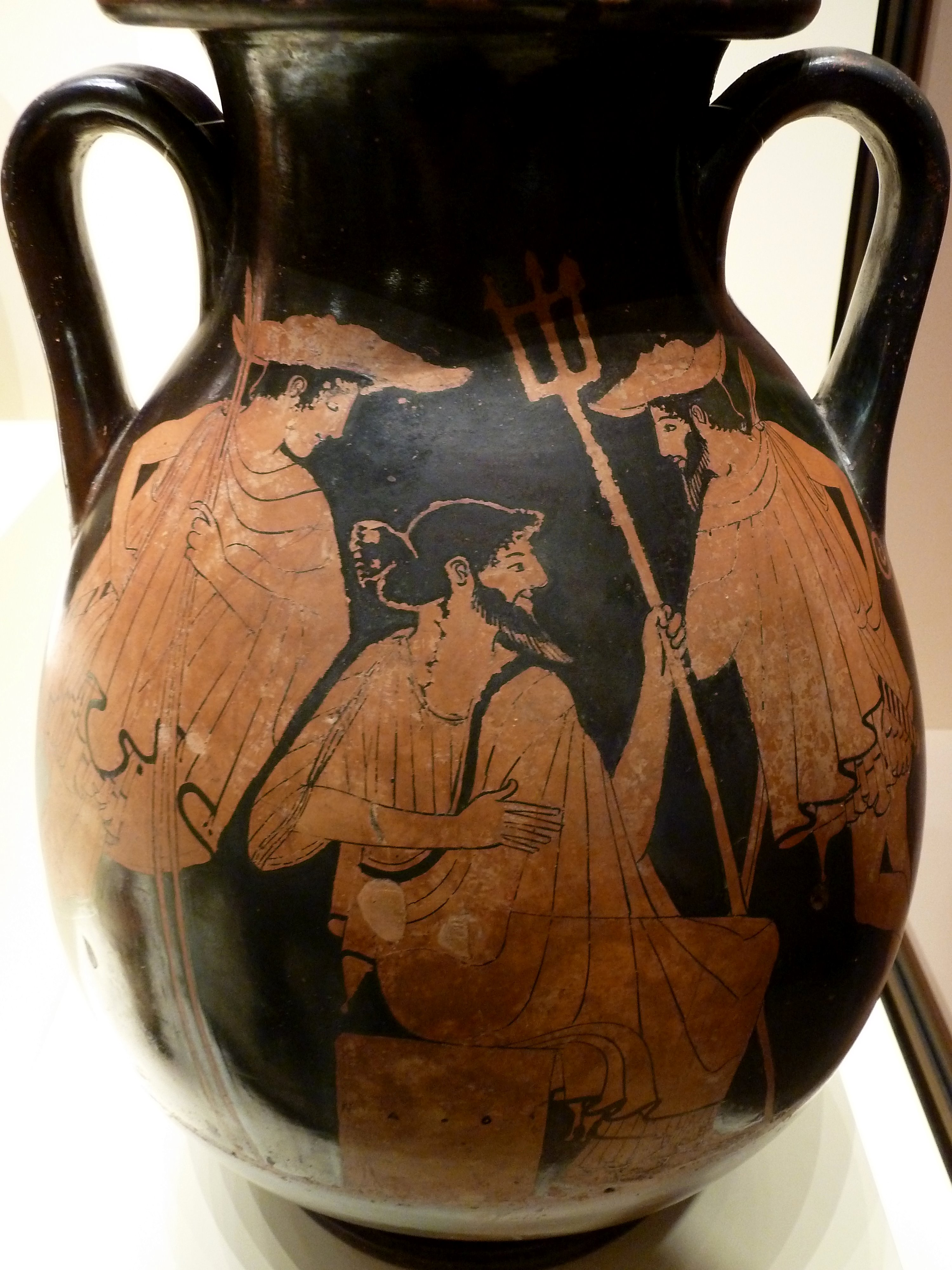
Poseidon and Theseus (on the left). Storage jar 470BC. J. Paul Getty Museum, Malibu, California

Poseidon fathered the hero Theseus with the Troezenian princess Aethra. Theseus was also said to be the son of Aegeus, the king of Athens, who slept with Aethra on the very same night. Thus Theseus's origins included both the human and the divine element.

Meanwhile, in Crete, Zeus's son Minos asked for Poseidon's help in order to certify his claim on the throne of Crete. Poseidon offered Minos a splendid white bull, with the understanding that he was to sacrifice the bull to Poseidon later. The Cretans were so impressed with the bull and the divine sign itself that Minos was declared king of Crete. But wishing to keep the beautiful animal for himself, Minos instead sacrificed an ordinary bull to the sea-god instead of the agreed upon one.

Poseidon, enraged, caused Minos's wife, Pasiphae, to fall in love with the bull; their coupling produced the Minotaur, a half-bull half-human creature who fed on human flesh. Minos concealed him within the labyrinth built by Daedalus, and fed to him Athenian men and women he forced Aegeus to send him over.

Once Theseus was grown up and recognized by Aegeus as his son, he decided to end the bloody tax Athens had to pay to Crete once and for all, and volunteered to set sail to Crete along with the other Athenian youths who had been chosen to be devoured by the Minotaur.

Once he arrived in Crete, Minos insulted Theseus and insisted he was no son of Poseidon; to demonstrate so, he threw his own ring in to the sea, and commanded Theseus to retrieve it, expecting he would not be able to do so. Theseus immediately dove in after it.

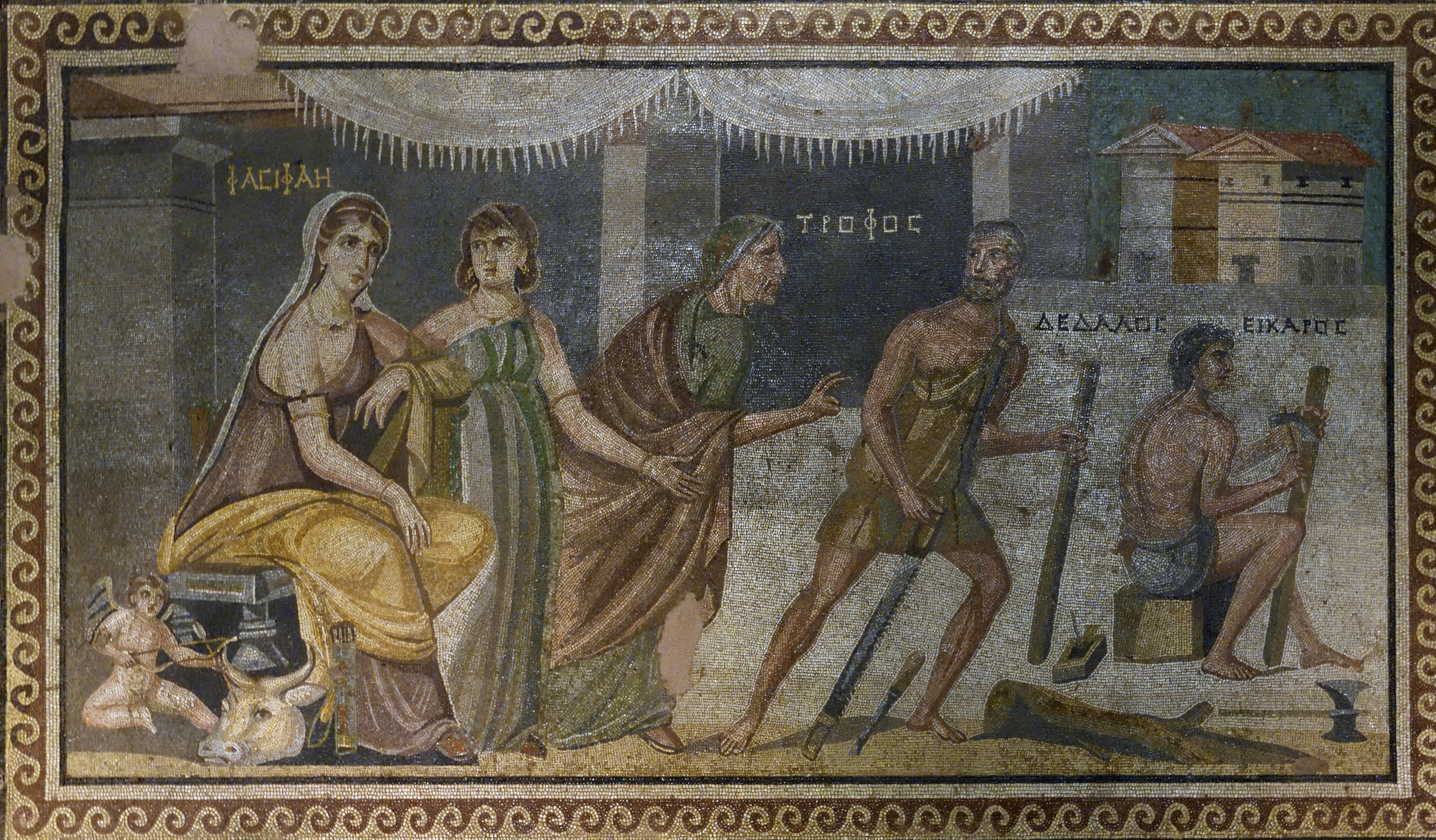
Pasiphae seated on a throne receives the wooden cow from Daidalos. Eros plays with the head of the crafted cow. Roman Mosaic, from Zeugma, Commagene. Zeugma Mosaic Museum, Gaziantep, Turkey

Dolphins then came as guides and escorted him to the halls of Poseidon's palace, where he was warmly welcomed. He received the ring, and in addition a purple wedding cloak and a crown from the Nereid Amphitrite, to prove his words. Theseus then emerged from the sea and gave the ring to Minos. Theseus killed the Minotaur, and in time succeeded his father Aegeus as king of Athens. By an Amazon he had a son, Hippolytus, while his wife Phaedra (Minos' daughter) gave him two sons.

At some point, Poseidon promised three favours to Theseus, and he called upon Poseidon to fulfill one of those when Phaedra falsely accused Hippolytus of forcing himself on her. Theseus, not knowing the truth, asked his father to destroy Hippolytus; Poseidon granted his son's wish, and as Hippolytus was driving by the sea, Poseidon sent a terrifying sea monster to spook the man's horses, which then dragged him to his death.

=== Walls of Troy ===
Poseidon and Apollo, having offended Zeus by their rebellion in Hera's scheme, were temporarily stripped of their divine authority and sent to serve King Laomedon of Troy. He had them build huge walls around the city and promised to reward them with his immortal horses, a promise he then refused to fulfill. In vengeance, before the Trojan War, Poseidon sent a sea monster to attack Troy. The monster was later killed by Heracles.

=== Consort, lovers and children ===
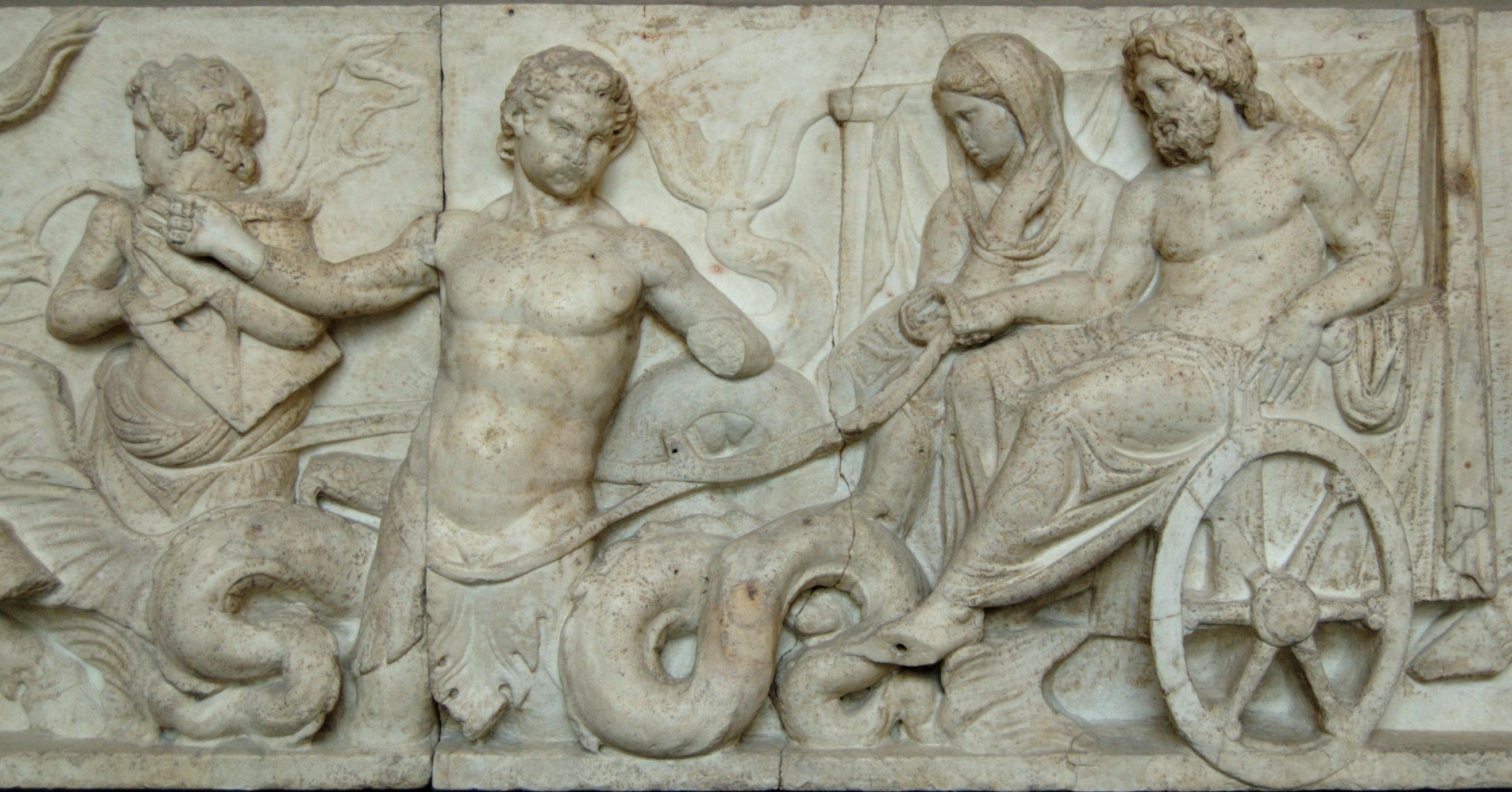
Sea thiasos depicting the wedding of Poseidon and Amphitrite, from the Altar of Domitius Ahenobarbus in the Field of Mars, bas-relief, Roman Republic, 2nd century BC

Poseidon was said to have had many lovers of both sexes. His consort was Amphitrite, an ancient sea-goddess and nymph, daughter of Nereus and Doris. In one account, attributed to the Hellenistic writer Eratosthenes, Poseidon wished to wed Amphitrite, but she fled from him and hid with Atlas. Poseidon sent out many to find her, and it was a dolphin who tracked her down. The dolphin persuaded Amphitrite to accept Poseidon as her husband, and eventually took charge of their wedding. Poseidon then put him among the stars as a reward for his good services. Oppian says that the dolphin betrayed Amphitrite's whereabouts to Poseidon, and he carried off Amphitrite against her will to marry her. Together they had a son named Triton, a merman.

A mortal woman named Cleito once lived on an isolated island; Poseidon fell in love with the human mortal and created a dwelling sanctuary at the top of a hill near the middle of the island and surrounded the dwelling with rings of water and land to protect her. She gave birth to five sets of twin boys; the firstborn, Atlas, became the first ruler of Atlantis.

Poseidon had an affair with Alope, his granddaughter through Cercyon, his son and King of Eleusis, begetting Hippothoon. Cercyon had his daughter buried alive but Poseidon turned her into the local spring.

With Gaia, Poseidon fathered the half-giant Antaeus.

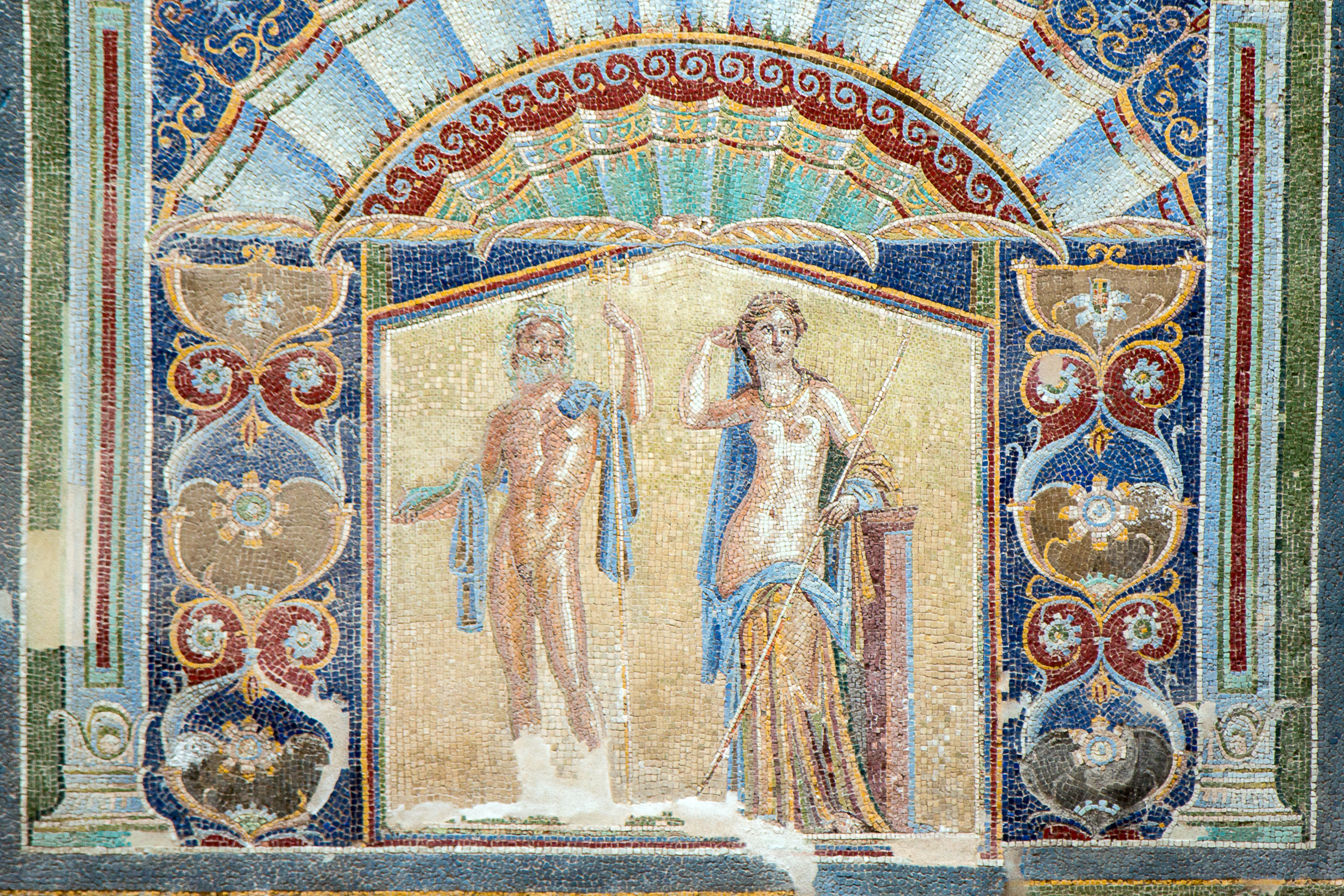
Poseidon-Neptune and Amphitrite. Roman Mosaic 1st century AD. House of Neptune, Herculanum. Metropolitan City of Naples

Poseidon was the father of many heroes. He is thought to have fathered the famed Theseus, Bellerophon, Alebion and Bergion. Not all of Poseidon's children were human, though. His other children include the Gigantes Otos and Ephialtes, the Cyclops Polyphemus and, finally, Amycus was the son of Poseidon and the Bithynian nymph Melia. The philosopher Plato was held by his fellow ancient Greeks to have traced his descent to the sea-God Poseidon through his father Ariston and his mythic predecessors the demigod kings Codrus and Melanthus.

Poseidon engaged in homosexual relationships as well. He took the young Nerites, the son of Nereus and Doris (and thus brother to Amphitrite) as a lover. Nerites was also Poseidon's charioteer, and impressed all marine creatures with his speed. But one day the sun god, Helios, turned Nerites into a shellfish. Aelian, who recorded this tale as told by mariners, says it is not clear why Helios did this, but theorizes he might have been offended somehow, or that he and Poseidon were rivals in love, and Helios wanted Nerites to travel among the constellations instead of the sea-monsters. From the love between Poseidon and Nerites was born Anteros, mutual love.

Other male lovers of Poseidon included Pelops and Patroclus.

==== Rape and assault victims ====
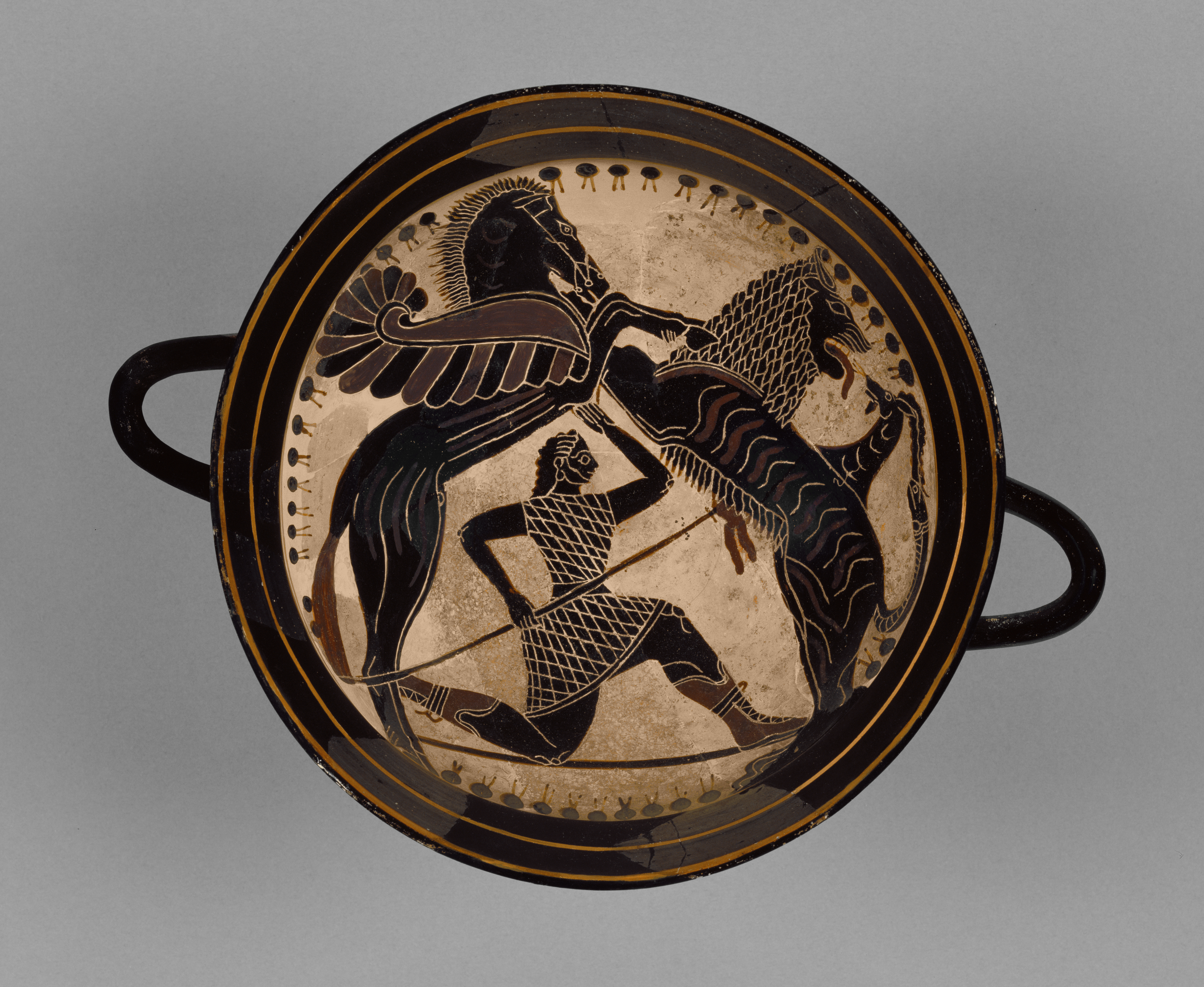
Bellerehron spears Chimera from underneath, while Pegasus strikes the monster with his hooves. Laconian Black Figure Kylix attributed to Boreads Painter, 570–565 B.C. J. Paul Getty Museum Malibu, California.

In an archaic myth, Poseidon once pursued Demeter. She spurned his advances, turning herself into a mare so that she could hide in a herd of horses; he saw through the deception and became a stallion, captured and raped her. Their child was a horse, Arion, which was capable of human speech.

According to Hesiod's Theogony, Poseidon "lay down in a soft meadow among spring flowers" with the Gorgon Medusa and two offspring, the winged horse Pegasus and the warrior Chrysaor, were born when the hero Perseus cut off Medusa's head. Ovid however says that Medusa was originally a very beautiful maiden whom Poseidon raped inside the temple of Athena. Athena, furious over the sacrilege, changed the beautiful girl into a monster. Elsewhere in the Metamorphoses, Ovid says that Poseidon seduced Medusa in the form of a bird.

When Zeus fell in love and pursued the goddess Asteria, she transformed into a quail and flung herself into the sea to escape being raped by him. Poseidon then, equally rapacious, picked up the chase where Zeus had left it and chased Asteria with the aim to force himself on her, so Asteria had to transform for a second time to save herself, this time into a small rocky island named Delos.

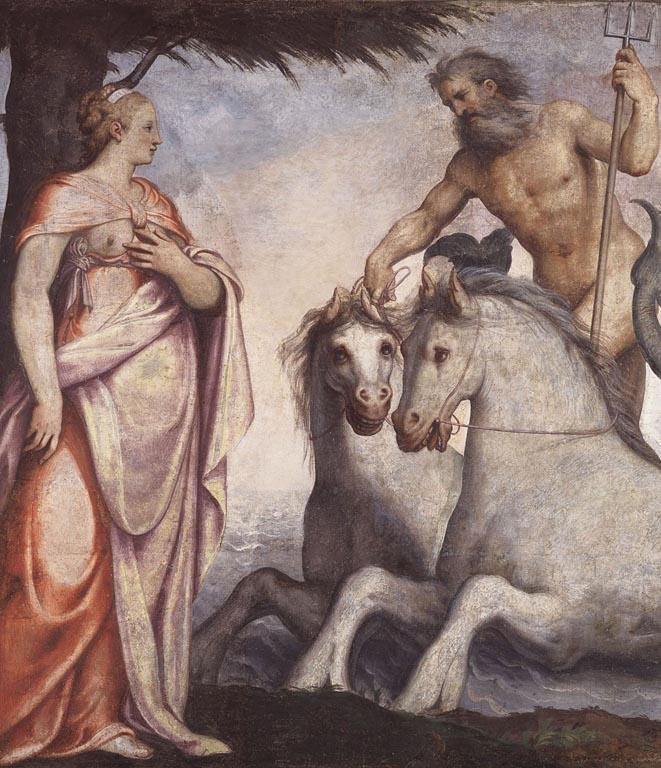
Lattanzio Gambara (c. 1530–Brescia 1574) - Poseidon-Neptune and Caenis

One day, Poseidon spotted Caenis walking by the seashore, caught her and raped her. Having enjoyed her greatly, he offered her a wish, any wish. Traumatized, Caenis wished to be transformed into a man, so that she would never experience assault again. Poseidon fulfilled her request and changed her into a male warrior, who then took the name Caeneus.

A mortal woman named Tyro was married to Cretheus (with whom she had one son, Aeson), but loved Enipeus, a river god. She pursued Enipeus, who refused her advances. One day, Poseidon, filled with lust for Tyro, disguised himself as Enipeus, and from their union were born the heroes Pelias and Neleus, twin boys.

Another time Poseidon once fell in love with a Phocian woman, Corone, the daughter of Coronaeus as she was walking along the shore. He attempted to court her, but she rejected him, and ran away. Poseidon then chased her down with the aim to rape her. Athena, witnessing all that, took pity in the girl and changed her into a crow.

==== List of offspring and their mothers ====
The following is a list of Poseidon's offspring, by various mothers. Beside each offspring, the earliest source to record the parentage is given, along with the century to which the source (in some cases approximately) dates.

Offspring	Mother	Source	Date
Triton	Amphitrite	Hes. Theog.	8th cent. BC
Benthesicyme	Amphitrite	Apollod.	1st/2nd cent. AD
Rhodos	Amphitrite	Apollod.	1st/2nd cent. AD
Antaeus	Gaia	Apollod.	1st/2nd cent. AD
Charybdis	Gaia	Servius	4th/5th cent. AD
Despoina	Demeter	Paus.	2nd cent. AD
Arion	Demeter	Apollod.	1st/2nd cent. AD
Rhodos	Aphrodite	Herodorus	
Pegasus, Chrysaor	Medusa	Apollod.	1st/2nd cent. AD
Ergiscus	Aba	Suda	10th cent. AD
Aethusa	Alcyone	Apollod.	1st/2nd cent. AD
Hyrieus	Alcyone	Apollod.	1st/2nd cent. AD
Hyperenor	Alcyone	Apollod.	1st/2nd cent. AD
Hyperes	Alcyone	Paus.	2nd cent. AD
Anthas	Alcyone	Paus.	2nd cent. AD
Abas	Arethusa	Hyg. Fab.	1st cent. AD
Halirrhothius	Bathycleia	Schol. Pind.	
Halirrhothius	Euryte	Apollod.	1st/2nd cent. AD
Chrysomallus	Theophane		
Minyas	Callirhoe	Tzetzes	12th cent. AD
Lycus, Nycteus, Eurypylus	Celaeno		
Asopus	Celusa	Paus.	2nd cent. AD
Asopus	Pero	Apollod.	1st/2nd cent. AD
Parnassus	Cleodora	Paus.	2nd cent. AD
Eumolpus	Chione	Apollod.	1st/2nd cent. AD
Phaeax	Corcyra	Diod. Sic.	1st cent. BC
Rhodos, six sons	Halia	Diod. Sic.	1st cent. BC
Eirene	Melantheia	Plutarch	1st/2nd cent. AD
Amykos	Melia	Eustathius	12th cent. AD
Aspledon	Mideia	Paus.	2nd cent. AD
Astacus	Olbia	Arrian	2nd cent. AD
Cenchrias, Lekhes	Peirene	Paus.	2nd cent. AD
Evadne	Pitane	Pindar	5th cent. BC
Phocus	Pronoe	Schol. Il.	
Athos	Rhodope	Schol. Theoc.	
Cychreus	Salamis	Diod. Sic.	1st cent. BC
Taras	Unnamed nymph	Paus.	2nd cent. AD
Polyphemus	Thoosa	Hom. Ody.	8th century BC
Chios	Unnamed nymph	Paus.	2nd cent. AD
Agelus, Melas	Unnamed nymph	Paus.	2nd cent. AD
Belus, Dictys, Actor	Agamede	Hyg. Fab.	1st cent. AD
Theseus	Aethra		
Ogyges	Alistra		
Hippothoon	Alope	Hyg. Fab.	1st cent. AD
Erythras	Amphimedusa	Schol. Il.	
Nauplius	Amymone	Ap. Rhod.	3rd cent. BC
Busiris	Anippe	Plutarch	1st/2nd cent. AD
Busiris	Lysianassa	Apollod.	1st/2nd cent. AD
Idas	Arene	Apollod.	1st/2nd cent. AD
Aeolus	Antiope		
Aeolus	Melanippe		
Boeotus	Arne	Diod. Sic.	1st cent. BC
Boeotus	Melanippe		
Oeoclus	Ascra	Paus.	2nd cent. AD
Ancaeus	Astypalaea	Paus.	2nd cent. AD
Eurypylus	Astypalaea	Apollod.	1st/2nd cent. AD
Peratus	Calchinia	Paus.	2nd cent. AD
Cycnus	Calyce	Hyg. Fab.	1st cent. AD
Cycnus	Harpale	Schol. Pind.	
Cycnus	Scamandrodice	Tzetzes	12th cent. AD
Aloeus, Epopeus, Hopleus, Nireus, Triopas	Canace	Apollod.	1st/2nd cent. AD
Celaenus	Celaeno	Strabo	1st cent. AD
Dictys, Polydectes	Cerebia	Tzetzes	12th cent. AD
Byzas	Ceroessa	Steph. Byz.	6th cent. AD
Chryses	Chrysogeneia	Paus.	2nd cent. AD
Minyas	Chrysogeneia	Schol. Ap. Rh.	
Phaunos	Circe	Nonnus	5th cent. AD
Atlas, Eumelus, Ampheres, Euaemon, Mneseus, Autochthon, Elasippus, Mestor, Azaes, Diaprepes	Cleito	Plato	4th cent. BC
Scylla	Crataeis		
Euphemus	Doris	Tzetzes	12th cent. AD
Euphemus	Europa	Pindar	5th cent. BC
Euphemus	Mecionice	Hes. Cat.	6th cent. BC
Orion	Euryale	Apollod.	1st/2nd cent. AD
Minyas	Euryanassa	Hes. Cat.	6th cent. BC
Minyas	Hermippe		
Minyas	Tritogeneia		
Eleius	Eurycyda	Paus.	2nd cent. AD
Eleius	Eurypyle	Conon	1st cent. BC/AD
Almops	Helle	Steph. Byz.	6th cent. AD
Edonus or Paion	Helle	Catast.	
Taphius	Hippothoe	Apollod.	1st/2nd cent. AD
The Aloadae	Iphimedeia	Hom. Ody.	8th century BC
Sciron	Iphimedeia	Apollod.	1st/2nd cent. AD
Achaeus, Pelasgus, Pythius	Larissa	Dion. Hal.	1st cent. BC
Althepus	Leis	Paus.	2nd cent. AD
Agenor, Belus	Libya	Apollod.	1st/2nd cent. AD
Lelex	Libya	Paus.	2nd cent. AD
Delphus	Melantho	Tzetzes	12th cent. AD
Dyrrhachius	Melissa	Steph. Byz.	6th cent. AD
Eurytus and Cteatus	Molione	Apollod.	1st/2nd cent. AD
Myton	Mytilene	Steph. Byz.	6th cent. AD
Megareus	Oenope	Hyg. Fab.	1st cent. AD
Sithon	Ossa	Conon	1st cent. BC/AD
Nausithous	Periboea	Hom. Ody.	8th century BC
Torone	Phoenice	Steph. Byz.	6th cent. AD
Cameirus, Ialysus, Lindus	Rhode		
Chthonius	Syme	Diod. Sic.	1st cent. BC
Leucon	Themisto	Hyg. Fab.	1st cent. AD
Pelias, Neleus	Tyro	Apollod.	1st/2nd cent. AD
Cercyon	Daughter of Amphictyon	Paus.	2nd cent. AD
Alebion, Derycnus	No mother mentioned	Apollod.	1st/2nd cent. AD
Dicaeus	No mother mentioned	Steph. Byz.	6th cent. AD
Syleus	No mother mentioned	Conon	1st cent. BC/AD
Sarpedon, Poltys	No mother mentioned	Apollod.	1st/2nd cent. AD
Amphimarus	No mother mentioned	Paus.	2nd cent. AD
Amyrus	No mother mentioned		
Aon	No mother mentioned	Schol. Stat.	
Astraeus	No mother mentioned	Ps.-Plut. Fluv.	2nd cent. AD
Augeas	No mother mentioned	Apollod.	1st/2nd cent. AD
Butes	No mother mentioned	Eustathius	12th cent. AD
Calaurus	No mother mentioned	Steph. Byz.	6th cent. AD
Caucon	No mother mentioned	Aelian	3rd cent. AD
Cromus	No mother mentioned	Paus.	2nd cent. AD
Kymopoleia	No mother mentioned	Hes. Theog.	8th cent. BC
Erginus	No mother mentioned	Ap. Rhod.	3rd cent. BC
Eryx	No mother mentioned	Apollod.	1st/2nd cent. AD
Euseirus	No mother mentioned	Ant. Lib.	2nd/3rd cent. AD
Geren	No mother mentioned	Steph. Byz.	6th cent. AD
Lamia	No mother mentioned	Paus.	2nd cent. AD
Lamus	No mother mentioned		
Onchestus	No mother mentioned	Paus.	2nd cent. AD
Palaestinus	No mother mentioned	Ps.-Plut. Fluv.	2nd cent. AD
Phineus	No mother mentioned	Apollod.	1st/2nd cent. AD
Phorbas	No mother mentioned	Suda	10th cent. AD
Sicelus	No mother mentioned	Solinus	3rd cent. AD
Taenarus	No mother mentioned		
Thasus	No mother mentioned	Apollod.	1st/2nd cent. AD
Thessalus	No mother mentioned		
Dorus	No mother mentioned	Servius	4th/5th cent. AD
Laocoön	No mother mentioned	Tzetzes	12th cent. AD
Damnameneus	No mother mentioned	Nonnus	5th cent. AD
Bellerophon	No mother mentioned		
Proteus	No mother mentioned	Apollod.	1st/2nd cent. AD

== Genealogy ==
Poseidon's family tree

Gaia
Uranus
Uranus's genitals	Coeus	Phoebe	Cronus	Rhea
Leto	Zeus	Hera	POSEIDON	Hades	Demeter	Hestia
Apollo	Artemis	a
b
Ares	Hephaestus
Metis
Athena
Maia
Hermes
Semele
Dionysus
Dione
a	b
Aphrodite

== In literature and art ==
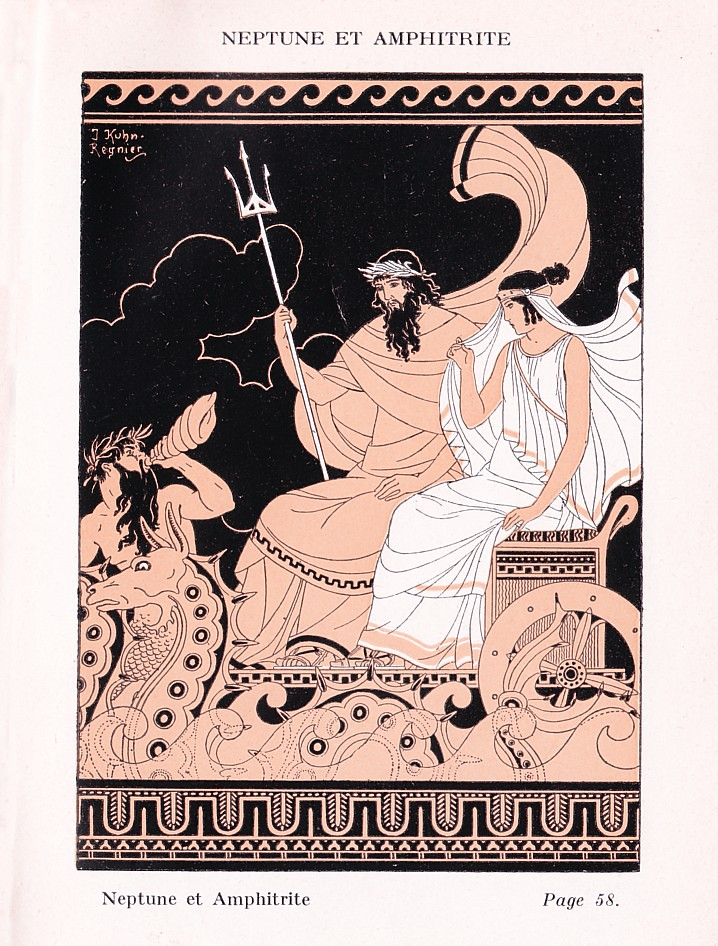
Poseidon and Amphitryte - Joseph Kuhn-Régnier

In Greek art, Poseidon lives in a palace on the ocean floor, made of coral and gems. He rides a chariot that is pulled by a hippocampus or by horses that could ride on the sea. He was associated with dolphins and three-pronged fish spears (tridents).

A hymn to Poseidon included among the Homeric Hymns is a brief invocation, a seven-line introduction that addresses the god as both "mover of the earth and barren sea, god of the deep who is also lord of Mount Helicon and wide Aegae", and specifies his twofold nature as an Olympian: "a tamer of horses and a saviour of ships".

In the Iliad, Poseidon favors the Greeks, and on several occasions takes an active part in the battle against the Trojan forces. However, in Book XX, he rescues Aeneas after the Trojan prince is laid low by Achilles.

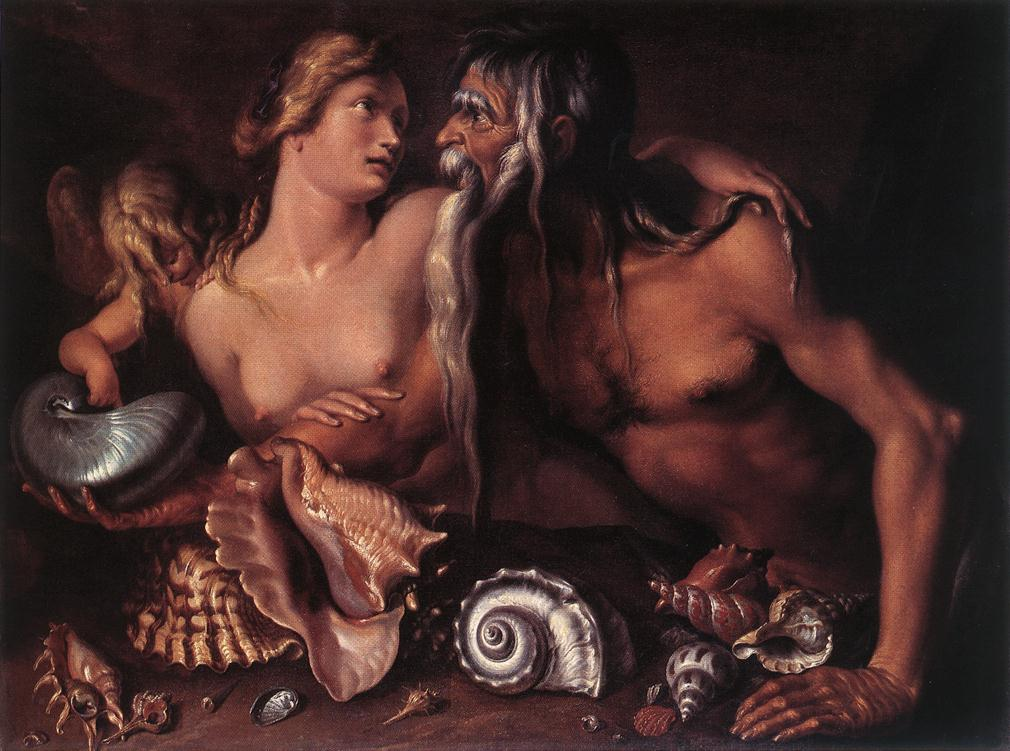
Neptune and Amphitrite by Jacob de Gheyn II (late 1500s)

In the Odyssey, Poseidon is notable for his hatred of Odysseus who blinded the sea-god's son, the Cyclops Polyphemus, resulting in Poseidon punishing him with storms, causing the complete loss of his ship and his numerous of his companions. The enmity of Poseidon prevents Odysseus's return home to Ithaca for ten years. Odysseus is even told, notwithstanding his ultimate safe return, that to placate the wrath of Poseidon will require one more voyage on his part. After Odysseus left the island of Calypso, Poseidon, in anger, let loose all four of the Anemoi to cause a storm and raise great waves in order to attempt to drown him.

In the Aeneid, Neptune is still resentful of the wandering Trojans, but is not as vindictive as Juno, and in Book I he rescues the Trojan fleet from the goddess's attempts to wreck it, although his primary motivation for doing this is his annoyance at Juno's having intruded into his domain.

== In modern culture ==
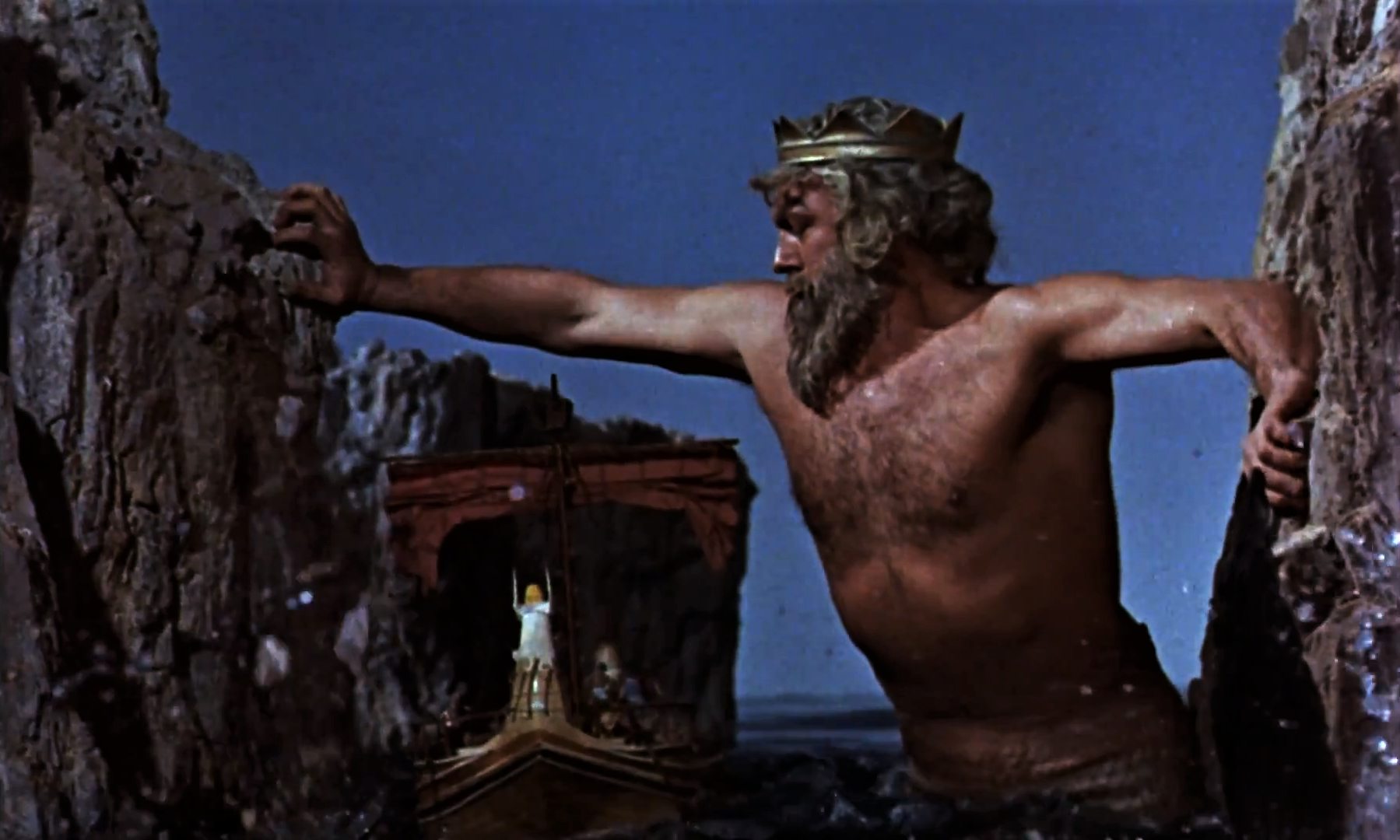
Poseidon as portrayed in the 1963 film Jason and the Argonauts

Due to his status as a Greek god, Poseidon has made multiple appearances in modern and popular culture.

Poseidon appeared in the 1963 film Jason and the Argonauts.

Poseidon appears in the Percy Jackson & the Olympians novel series, where he is the father of the titular protagonist Percy Jackson. In the first film adaptation, Percy Jackson & the Olympians: The Lightning Thief, released in 2010, he is portrayed by Kevin McKidd.

Poseidon has made multiple appearances in video games, such as in God of War 3 by Sony. In the game, Poseidon appears as a boss for the player to defeat. In the video game Hades, he is a character who will grant "boons".

== Narrations ==
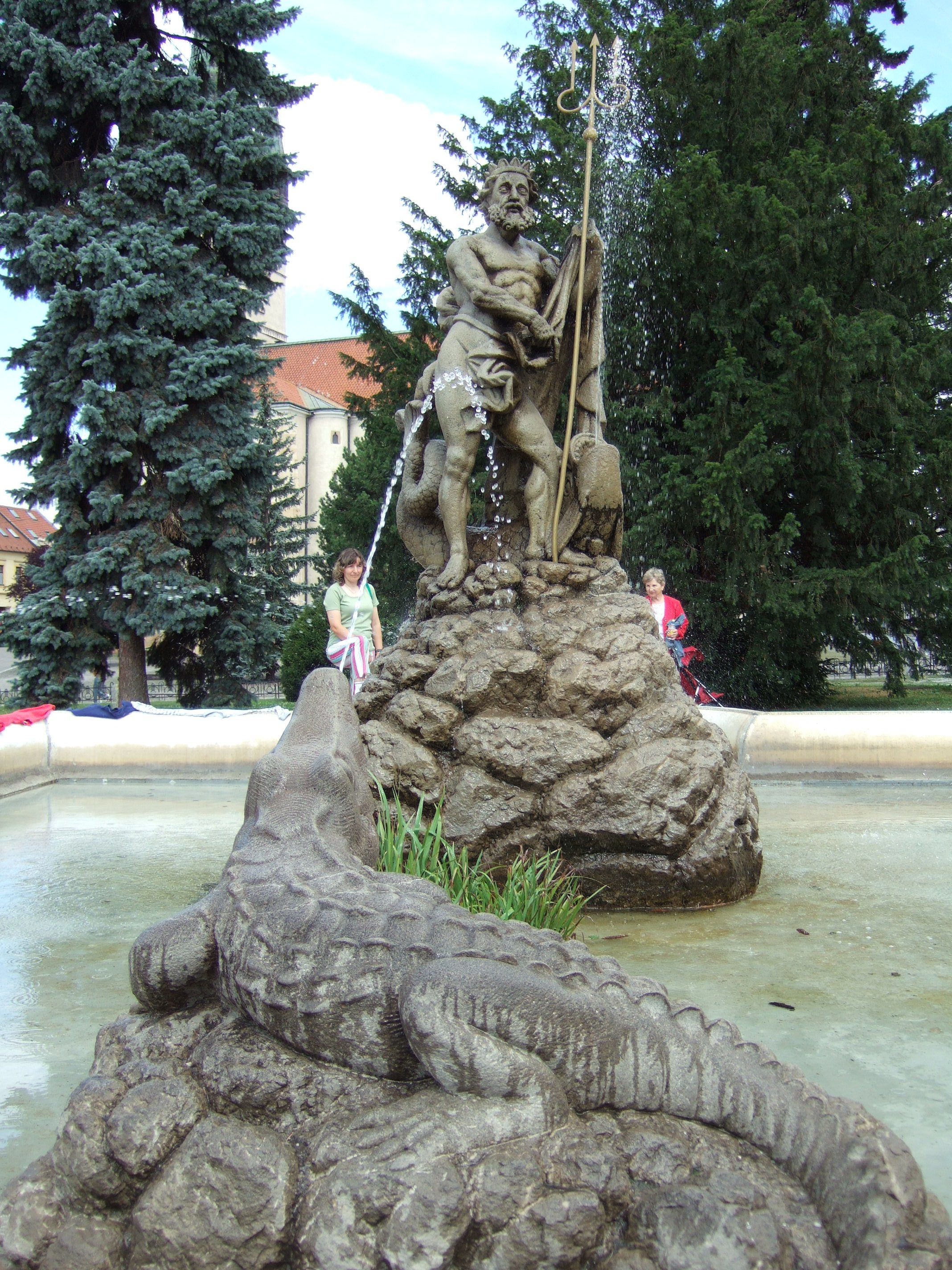
Neptune's fountain in Prešov, Slovakia.

The following is a (non-exhaustive) list of pre-modern tellings and retellings of myths relating to Poseidon:

- Homer, Odyssey, 11.567 (7th century BC)
- Pindar, Olympian Odes, 1 (476 BC)
- Sophocles, Electra, 504 (430 – 415 BC) & Oenomaus, Fr. 433 (408 BC)
- Euripides, Orestes, 12–16, 1024-1062 (408 BC)
- Bibliotheca Epitome 2: 1–9 (140 BC)
- Diodorus Siculus, Histories, 4.73 (1st century BC)
- Ovid, Metamorphoses, VI: 213, 458 (AD 8);
- Hyginus, Fables, 82: Tantalus, 83: Pelops, 84: Oenomaus & Poetic Astronomy, ii (1st century AD)
- Pausanias, Description of Greece, 2.22.3, 5.1.3–7, 5.13.1, 6.21.9, 8.14.10–11 (c. AD 160 – 176)
- Philostratus the Elder Imagines, I.30: Pelops (AD 170 – 245)
- Philostratus the Younger, Imagines, 9: Pelops (c. 200 – 245)
- First Vatican Mythographer, 22: Myrtilus; Atreus et Thyestes
- Second Vatican Mythographer, 146: Oenomaus

== Gallery ==
=== Paintings ===
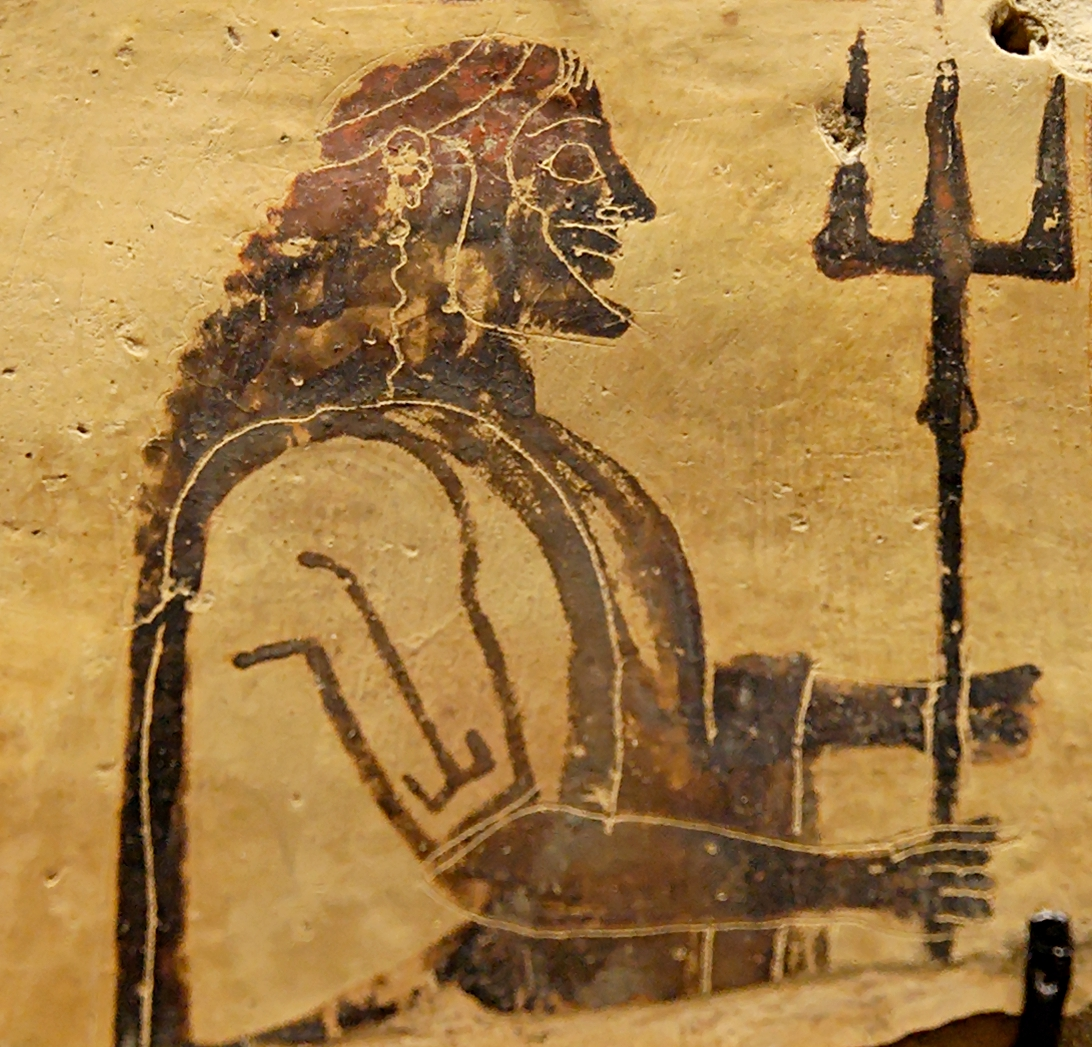
Poseidon holding a trident. Corinthian plaque, 550-525 BC. From Penteskouphia.

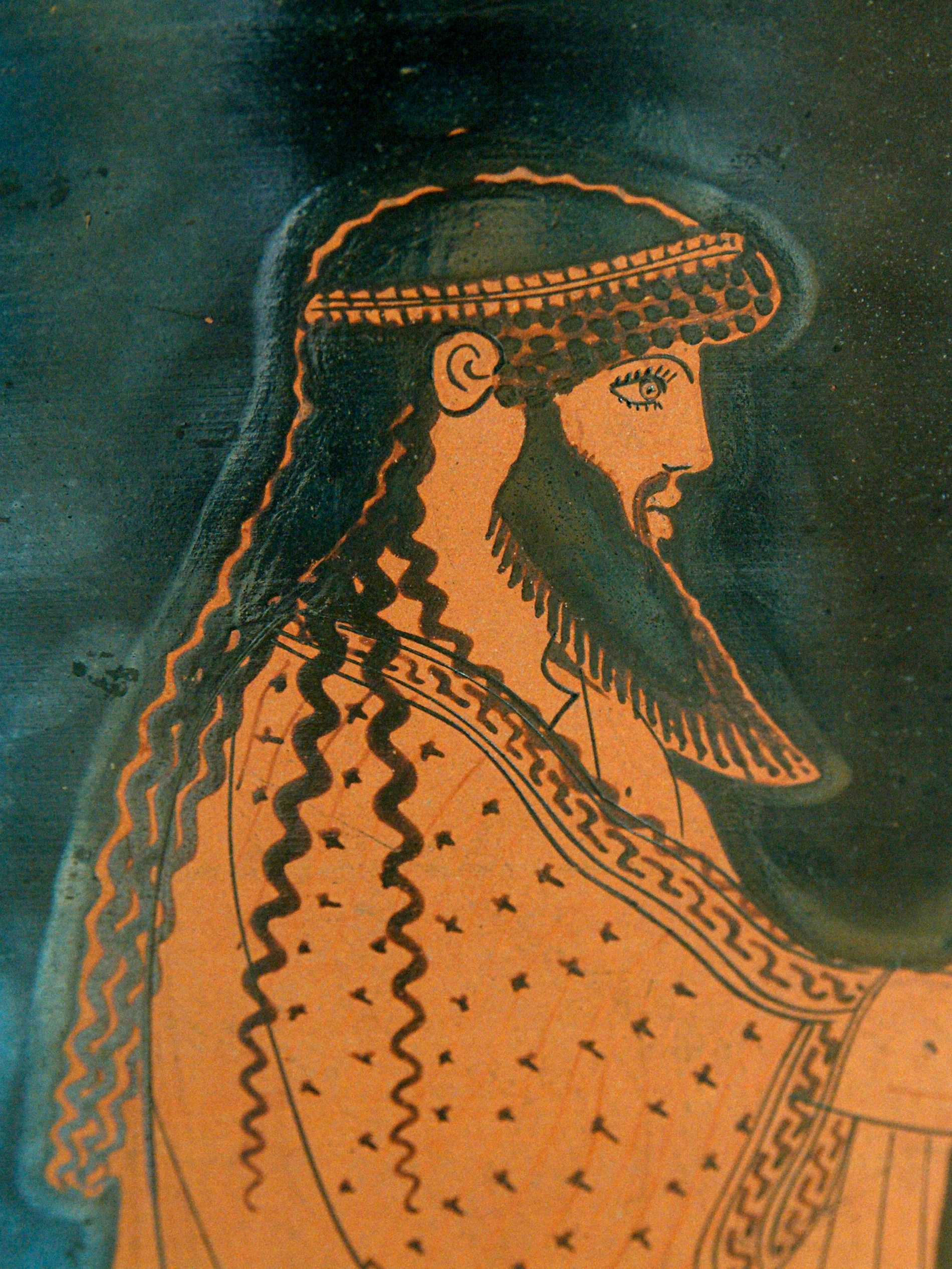
Poseidon on an Attic kalyx krater (detail), first half of the 5th century BC.

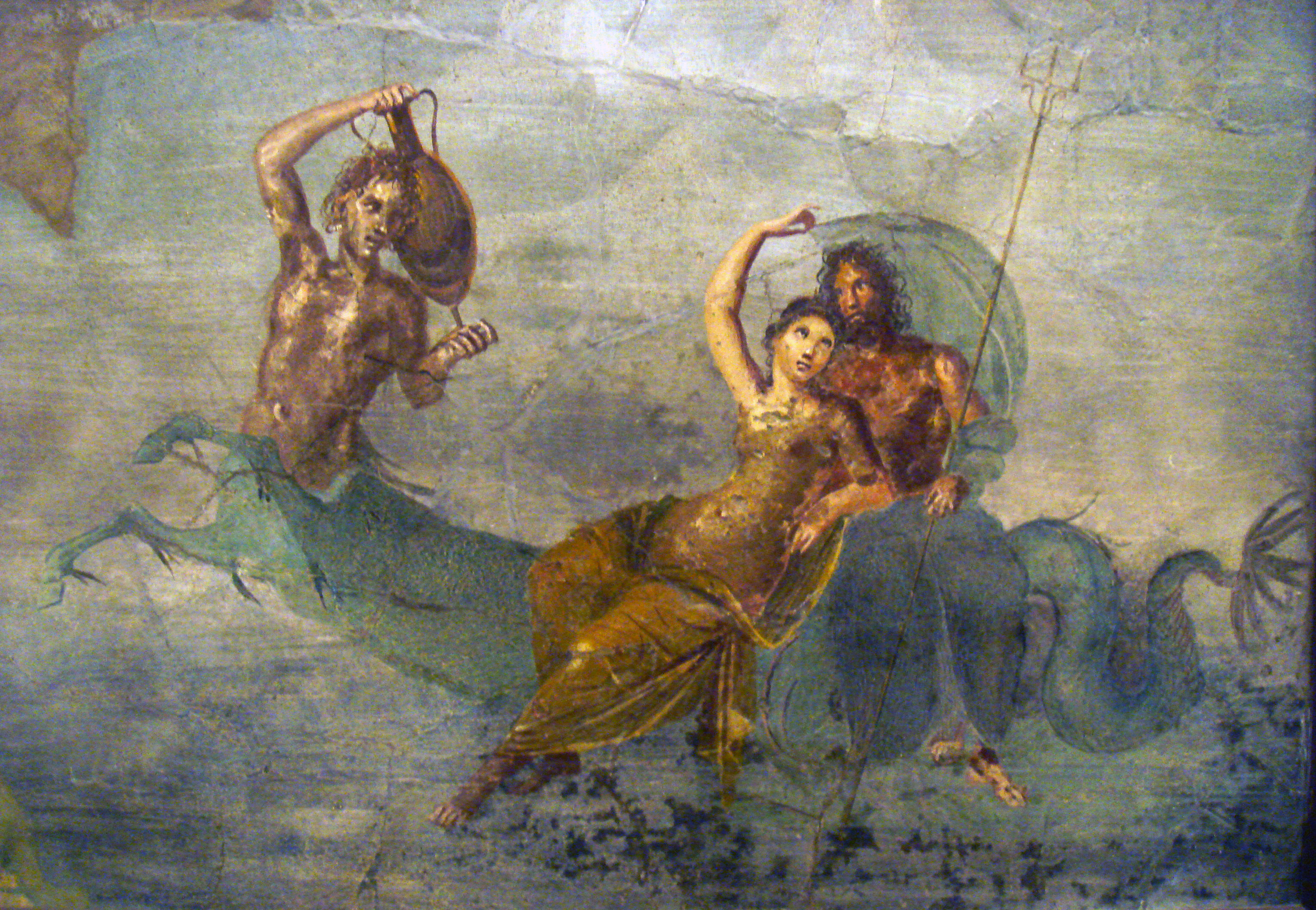
Poseidon and Amphitrite. Ancient Roman fresco (50-79 AD), Pompeii, Italy.

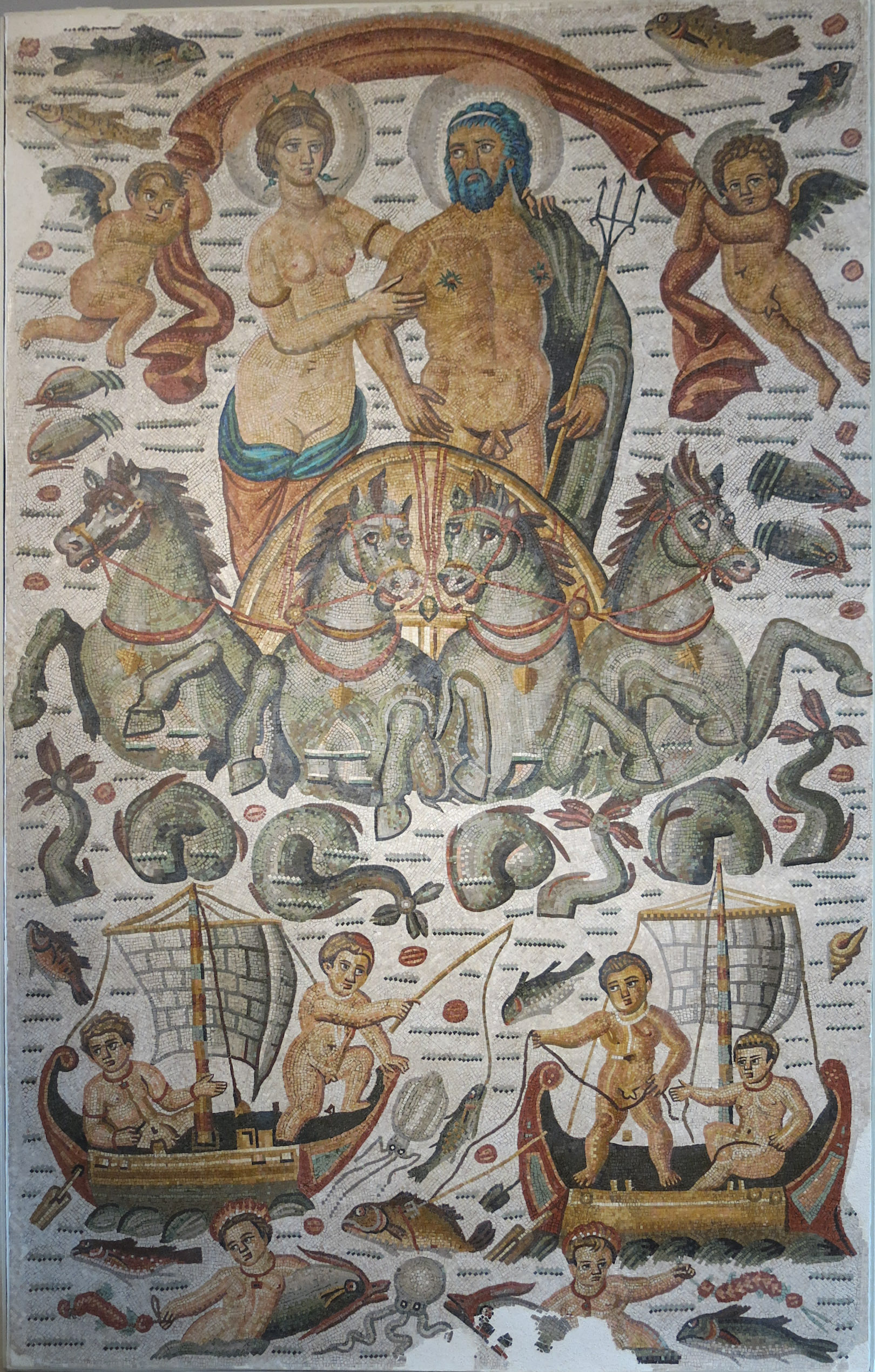
Triumph of Poseidon and Amphitrite showing the couple in procession, detail of a vast mosaic from Cirta, Roman Africa (ca. 315–325 AD, now at the Louvre)

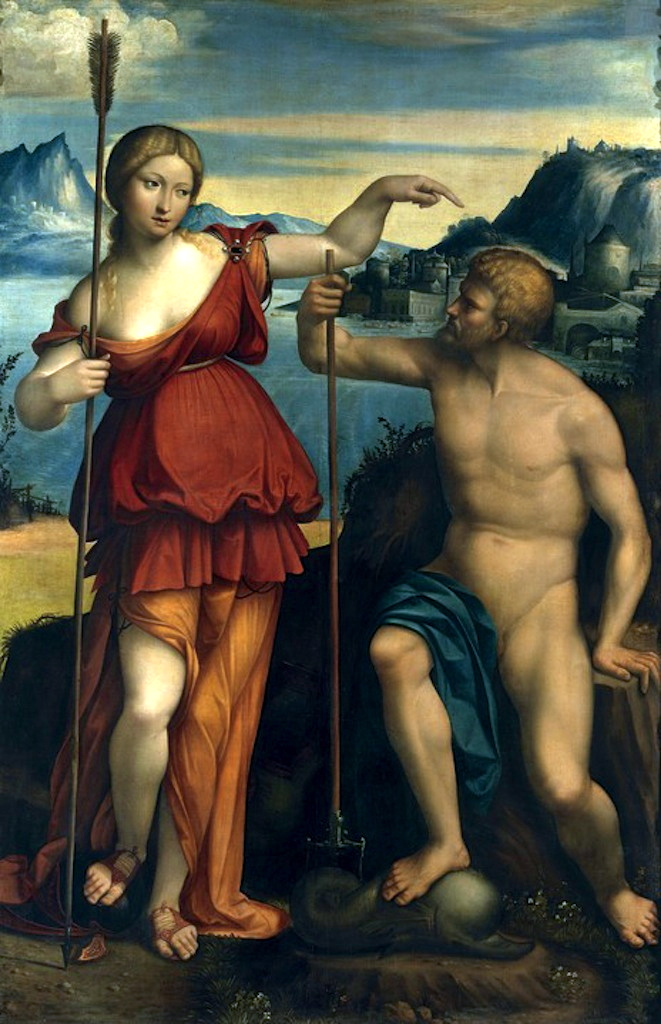
Poseidon and Athena battle for control of Athens by Benvenuto Tisi(1512)

=== Statues ===
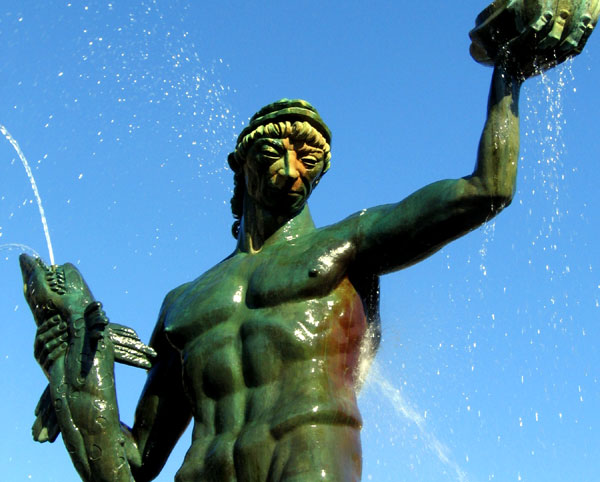
Poseidon statue in Gothenburg, Sweden.

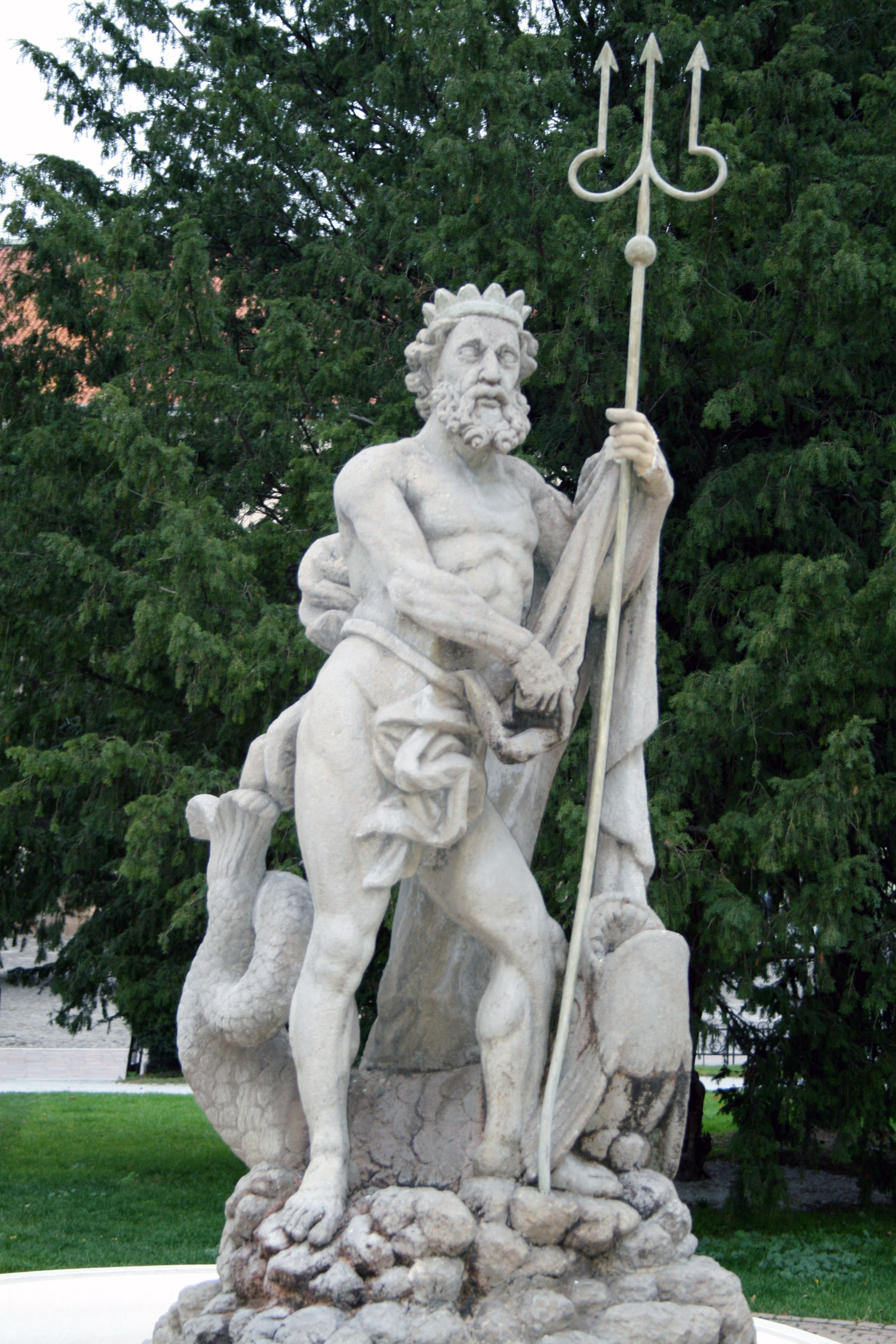
Poseidon statue in Prešov, Slovakia

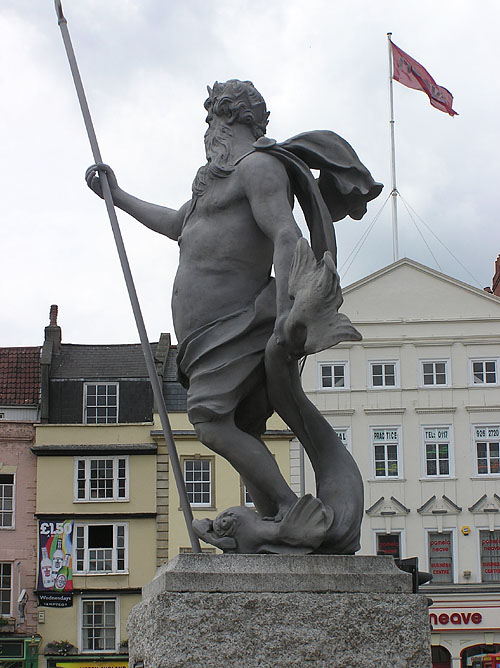
Poseidon statue in Bristol, England.

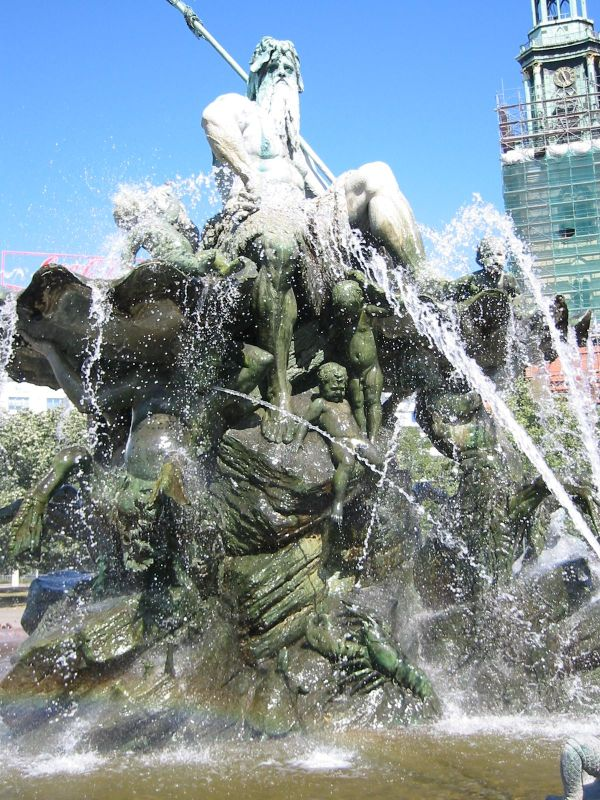
The Neptunbrunnen fountain in Berlin

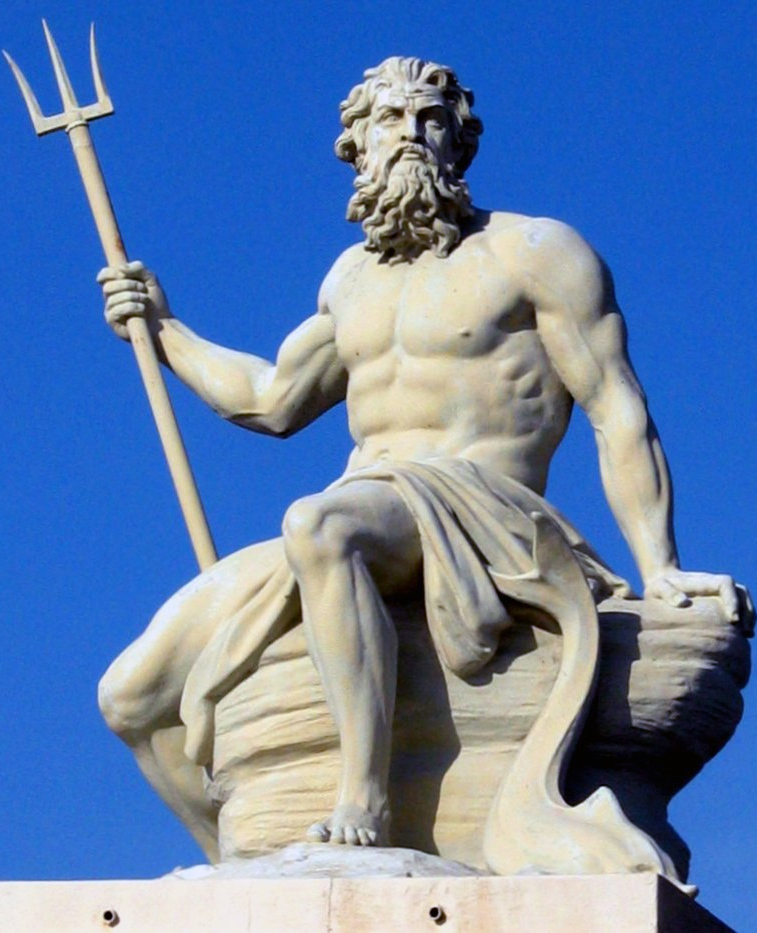
Poseidon sculpture in Copenhagen, Denmark

== See also ==
- Amphitrite
- Despoina
- Demeter
- Erechtheus
- Family tree of the Greek gods
- Ionian League
- Panionium – Ionian festival to Poseidon
- Trident of Poseidon
- Linear B
