= Evanthes =

Figures in Greek mythology

In Greek mythology, Evanthes or Euanthes (Ancient Greek: Εὐανθής means "the richly blooming") may refer to two different individuals:

- Evanthes, son of Oenopion, son of Ariadne and Dionysus. His mother was probably the nymph Helice and his only sister was Merope (Aero) who was raped by the giant Orion. Together with his brothers, Talus, Melas, Salagus and Athamas, they followed their father when he sailed from Crete to settle in Chios. Other sources makes Euanthes a son of Dionysus and Ariadne and brother to Oenopion, Thoas, Staphylus, Latromis and Tauropolis. He was also said to be one the generals of Rhadamanthys who was presented by the later with the city of Maroneia. Euanthes had a son Maron who was encountered by Odysseus in Ismarus, land of the Ciconians.
- Evanthes, a Phrygian who fought on Aeneas' side in Italy. He was killed by Mezentius, king of the Etruscans.
