= Talos (mythology) =

Character in Greek mythology

In Greek mythology, Talos or Talus (/ˈteɪlɒs/; Ancient Greek: Τάλως Talōs) may refer to the following characters mostly connected with Crete:

- Talos, a man of bronze who guarded Crete.
- Talos, a son of Cres (son of Idaea and Zeus) and the father of Hephaestus who also fathered Rhadamanthys. This Talos is considered by some scholars to be the same as the Talos who guarded Crete.
- Talus, a son of Oenopion, son of Ariadne. His possible mother was the nymph Helice and his only sister was Merope (Aero). Together with his brothers Euanthes, Melas, Salagus and Athamas, they followed their father when he sailed with a fleet from Crete to Chios. This Talos is considered by some scholars to be the same as the Talos who guarded Crete.
- Talos, son of Daedalus' sister Perdix. Daedalus seeing that his disciple Talos was more gifted than himself, killed him.
- Talos, a soldier in the army of Turnus, the man who opposed Aeneas in Italy. He was killed by Aeneas.
