= Cytissorus =

Founder of Cytorus in Greek mythology

In Greek mythology, Cytisorus (Ancient Greek: Κυτίσωρος, romanized: Kytísōros) or Cytorus (Κυτώρου) or Cylindrus was the founder of Cytorus.

== Family ==
Cytisorus was the son of Phrixus and Chalciope (Iophassa), daughter of King Aeetes of Colchis. He was the brother of Argus, Melas, Phrontis, and according to some accounts, also of Presbon.

== Mythology ==
Cytisorus and his brothers were raised in Colchis, but after their father died, he and his brothers set out to avenge their father’s ill treatment in the hands of king Athamas of Orchomenus and were stranded on Island of Ares (Dia) in the Black Sea until they were rescued from the island by Jason and the Argonauts. Once Jason discovered that Cytisorus and his brothers were grandsons of King Aeëtes of Colchis, Jason convinced Cytisorus and his brothers to return with him to Colchis and help him to obtain the Golden Fleece. Jason also questioned Cytisorus and his brothers on the layout and security of the land. After the Fleece was retrieved from Colchis, Phrontis and his brothers returned with the Argo's crew to Greece.

In another version of the myth, the Achaeans were just about to sacrifice Athamas who was a scapegoat to purge the sins of the country according to the command of an oracle but Cytisorus came from Aea in Colchis and delivered his grandfather Athamas. Having done so, Cytisorus brought the wrath of the gods upon his own descendants. In other myths, Sophocles represented Athamas as led to the altar, a victim to the vengeance of Nephele but was saved by Heracles instead.
