= Phrontis (son of Phrixus) =

Character in Greek mythology

In Greek mythology, Phrontis (/fron-tis/; Ancient Greek: Φροντις) or Phrontides was one of four (or five) sons of Phrixus and Chalciope (Iophossa), daughter of King Aeetes of Colchis. His brothers were Cytissorus, Argus and Melas, and according to some accounts, also of Presbon.

== Mythology ==
Phrontis and his brothers were raised in Colchis, but after their father died, he and his brothers set out to avenge their father’s ill treatment at the hands of king Athamas of Orchomenus; they were stranded on the Island of Ares (Dia) in the Black Sea until they were rescued from the island by Jason and the Argonauts. Once Jason discovered that Phrontis and his brothers were grandsons of King Aeëtes of Colchis, Jason convinced Phrontis and his brothers to return with him to Colchis and help him to obtain the Golden Fleece. Jason also questioned Phrontis and his brothers on the layout and security of the land. After the Fleece was retrieved from Colchis, Phrontis and his brothers returned with the Argo's crew to Greece.
