= Salagus =

Figure in Greek mythology

In Greek mythology, Salagus (Ancient Greek: Σάλαγόν) was the Cretan son of Oenopion, son of Ariadne. His mother was probably the nymph Helice and his sister was Merope (Aero) who was raped by the giant hunter Orion. Together with his brothers Euanthes, Melas, Talus and Athamas, they followed their father when he sailed with a fleet from Crete to Chios.
