= Perdix (disambiguation) =

Perdix is a genus of partridges with representatives in most of temperate Europe and Asia.

Perdix may also refer to:

- Perdix (mythology), nephew of Daedalus in Greek mythology
- Moexipril, a drug sold under the trade name Perdix
- Perdix (drone), an American unmanned aerial vehicle
