= Telesarchus (disambiguation) =

Telesarchus was a little-attested Greek writer.

Telesarchus may also refer to:

- Telesarchus (military commander) (fl. 279 BC), a Syro-Macedonian military commander
- Telesarchus of Samos, a 6th-century BC aristocrat in The Histories of Herodotus
- Telesarchus of Aegina, a 5th-century BC patron of the Greek lyric poet Pindar
