= Alcathous =

Multiple Greek mythological figures

Alcathous (/ælˈkæθoʊəs/; Ancient Greek: Ἀλκάθοος, romanized: Alkathoos, lit. 'one who runs with might' or 'swift and strong') was the name of several people in Greek mythology:

- Alcathous, a Calydonian prince as the son of King Porthaon and Euryte, daughter of Hippodamas. He was the brother of Oeneus (successor of Porthaon), Agrius, Melas, Leucopeus, and Sterope. Alcathous was the second suitor of Hippodamia, and thus slain by her father Oenomaus like the other suitors except Pelops.
- Alcathous, possible son of Agrius who together with his brother Lycopeus, died at the hands of his cousin, Tydeus who went then into exile to Argos.
- Alcathous, son of Pelops, who killed the Cithaeronian lion.
- Alcathous, one of the guardians of Thebes. He was killed by Amphiaraus during the war of the Seven against Thebes.
- Alcathous, a Trojan soldier in the company of Paris and Agenor. He was son of Aesyetes and husband of Hippodamia, sister of Aeneas. Alcathous' mother may be Cleomestra, daughter of Tros, and thus, brother to Antenor and Assaracus. Alcathous was slain by Idomeneus, king of Crete.
- Alcathous, another Trojan warrior, killed by Achilles in the Trojan War.
- Alcathous, one of the companions of Aeneas. He was killed by Caedicus, one of the warriors of Turnus.

== See also ==
- 2241 Alcathous
