= Eurycleia (disambiguation) =

Eurycleia is the daughter of Ops and granddaughter of Peisenor, as well as the wet-nurse of Odysseus.

Eurycleia may also refer to:

- Eurycleia (mythology), figures in Greek mythology
- 195 Eurykleia, a main belt asteroid
- H. a. eurycleia, a subspecies of butterfly species Heliconius aoede
- Eurycleia, a crater on Tethys (moon of Saturn)
