= Eurycleia (mythology) =

In Greek mythology, Eurycleia (Ancient Greek: Εὐρύκλεια, romanized: Eurúkleia, lit. 'wide glory') or Euryclia may refer to the following women:

- Eurycleia, nurse of Odysseus.
- Eurycleia, a Boeotian princess as the daughter of King Athamas and Themisto, and thus, sister to Leucon, Erythrius, Schoeneus, and Ptous. She became the mother of Hyperes by Melas, son of Phrixus and Chalciope.
- Eurycleia, a Boeotian princess, the daughter of King Athamas and his wife Queen Ino. She was killed, along with her brother Learchus, during their father's madness fit.
