= Hystoe =

Hystoe or Hystoë was a town of ancient Crete, which the Scholiast on Aratus connects with the Idaean nymph Cynosura, one of the nurses of Zeus.

Its site is unlocated.
