= Cedalion =

Character in Greek mythology

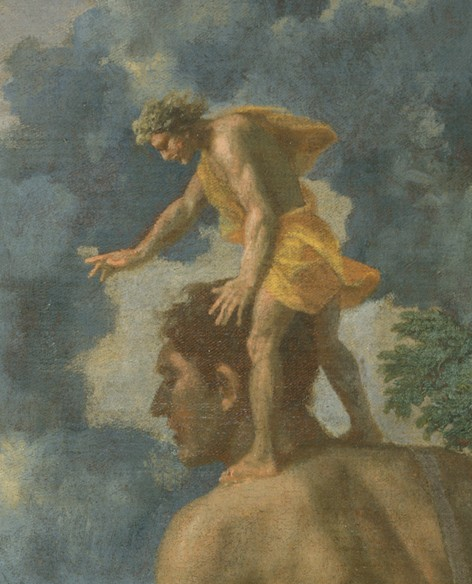
Cedalion standing on the shoulders of Orion; detail from Blind Orion Searching for the Rising Sun by Nicolas Poussin, 1658, Oil on canvas; 46 7/8 x 72 in. (119.1 x 182.9 cm), Metropolitan Museum of Art

In Greek mythology, Cedalion (Ancient Greek: Κηδαλίων, romanized: Kēdalíōn) was a servant of Hephaestus in Lemnos, an island in the Aegean Sea. Cedalion is best known for his part in aiding the hunter Orion navigate the world after being blinded, and helping him to reach Helios who healed his eyesight.

== Etymology ==
One traditional etymology is from kēdeuein "to take charge, to care for", and early nineteenth century scholars agreed. Scholars since Wilamowitz, however, support the other traditional interpretation, as "phallos", from a different sense of the same verb: "to marry" (said of the groom).

== Mythology ==
According to one tradition, he was Hephaestus's tutor, with whom Hera fostered her son on Naxos to teach him smithcraft. Kerenyi compares him to the Cabeiri, to Chiron, and to Prometheus.

The more common story of Cedalion tells of his part in the healing of Orion, who came to Lemnos after he was blinded by Oenopion. Orion took up Cedalion and set the youth upon his shoulders for a guide to the East. There, the rays of Helios restored Orion's sight.

Sophocles wrote a satyr play Cedalion, of which a few words survive. Its plot is uncertain, whether the blinding of Orion by Oenopion and the satyrs on Chios, probably with Cedalion offstage and prophesied, or the recovery of Orion's sight on Lemnos. It has also been suggested that the subject may be Hephaestus's fostering; or the instructions given to the blinded Orion by satyrs in Cedalion's service. One of the surviving lines suggests extreme drunkenness; Burkert reads this fragment as from a chorus of Cabeiri.

== Iconography ==
Wilamowitz speculates that Cedalion is the dwarf in the Louvre relief showing Dionysius in Hephaestus' workplace.

== See also ==
- Dactyls
- Talthybius
- Cynosura
