= Helice (mythology) =

Greek mythological figure

In Greek mythology, Helice (Ancient Greek: Ἑλίκη, romanized: Helikē, lit. 'willow'; pronounced /ˈhɛlɪsiː/ or [heˈlikɛː], HEH-li-kee, modern Greek pronunciation: [eˈlici], eh-LEE-kee) was a name shared by several women:

- Helice, nurse of the god Zeus during his infancy on Crete together with her sister Aex. Her name suggests that she was a "willow-nymph", just as there were oak-tree nymphs and ash-nymphs (Dryads and Meliae). It is likely that she is the same as Ide. When Cronus once came to Crete in search of Zeus, the young god hid himself and his nurses by turning them into bears, as he became a serpent. Later, when he became king, he made them both constellations, Helice becoming Ursa Major, while Cynosura became Ursa Minor. Helice, in antiquity, was a common proper name for the constellation Ursa Major. Another account relates that Helice and her sister Aex were the nymph-daughters of Olenus, son of Hephaestus. It was said that the trio gave their names to the following cities— Olenus in Aulis, Helice in the Peloponnesus, and Aex in Haemonia.
- Helice, another name of Callisto, a daughter of King Lycaon of Arcadia and one of Artemis' nymphs. She was beloved by Zeus, but Hera, out of jealousy, metamorphosed her into a she-bear, whereupon Zeus placed her among the stars, under the name of the Great Northern Bear. In one version, Demeter asks the stars whether they know anything about her daughter Persephone's abduction, and Helice tells her to ask Helios, who knows the deeds of the day, because the night is blameless and knows nothing.
- Helice, a nymph who became the wife of King Oenopion of Chios and mother by him of Melas, Talus, Maron, Euanthes, Salagus, Athamas and Merope (Aero).
- Helice, an Aegialian princess as the only daughter of King Selinus who wed her with Ion. By the latter, she became the mother of Bura. Later on, Ion built a city which he named after Helice.
