= Magnes (son of Argos) =

Mythological figure

In Greek mythology, Magnes (/ˈmæɡˌniːz/; Ancient Greek: Μάγνης) was a son of Argos (son of Phrixus) and Perimele (daughter of Admetus). He lived in the region of Thessaly, in the land which men called after him Magnesia. Magnes had a son of remarkable beauty, Hymen by the muse Calliope.

== Mythology ==
When the god Apollo saw the boy Hymenaeus, he was seized with love for him and would not leave the house of Magnes. Because of this, Hermes plotted to get the herd of the cattle belonging to Apollo that were pastured in the same place as the cattle of Admetus.
