= Perimele =

Greek mythological figures

In Greek mythology, Perimele or Perimela (Ancient Greek: Περιμήλη) is the name of three mythical personages:

- Perimele, daughter of Amythaon. She and Antion, son of Periphas, were the possible parents of Ixion.
- Perimele, daughter of Admetus and Alcestis, mother of Magnes by Argus (son of Phrixus and Chalciope).
- Perimele, daughter of Hippodamas, who was loved by Achelous and lay with him secretly. When her father discovered that, he pushed her off a cliff into the sea. Achelous kept her floating on the waves for a while, imploring Poseidon to help her. The sea god transformed her into an island which bore her name, one of the Echinades.
