= Bathycleia =

Greek mythological figure

In Greek mythology, Bathycleia (Ancient Greek: Βαθύκλεια, romanized: Bathykleia, lit. 'deep glory' or 'profound fame') was the mother of Hallirrhothius by Poseidon. After her son raped Alcippe, the maiden's father Ares, in revenge, killed Halirrhothius. Bathycleia may be the same as the nymph Euryte, another name for the mother of Halirrhothius.
