= Agelus =

In Greek mythology, Agelus (Ancient Greek: Ἄγελόν, romanized: Ágelos, lit. 'leading the herd', 'driving the people' or 'leader of the people') was the son of Poseidon and an unnamed nymph of Chios. He was the brother of Melas and Malina.
