= Euryte =

Multiple Greek mythological figures

In Greek mythology, the name Euryte (/ˈjʊərɪtiː/; Ancient Greek: Εὐρύτη, lit. 'broadness, width') may refer to the following women:

- Euryte, the nymph mother of Halirrhothius by Poseidon. She may be the same with Bathycleia, another name for the mother of Halirrhothius.
- Euryte, the daughter of Hippodamas in the Bibliotheca, a 2nd-century AD mythological compendium by the mythographer Apollodorus. By Porthaon, the king of Calydon, she was the mother of Oeneus, Agrius, Leucopeus, Melas, Alcathous and Sterope.
- The name of one the numerous daughters of Thespius, the founder of Thespiae, catalogued by Apollodorus was traditionally rendered as Eurýkē (Εὐρύκη). The philologist Richard Wagner emended this name to Eurýtē (Εὐρύτη). Apollodorus states that this figure is the mother of Teleutagoras by the hero Heracles.
