= Oenopion =

King in Greek mythology

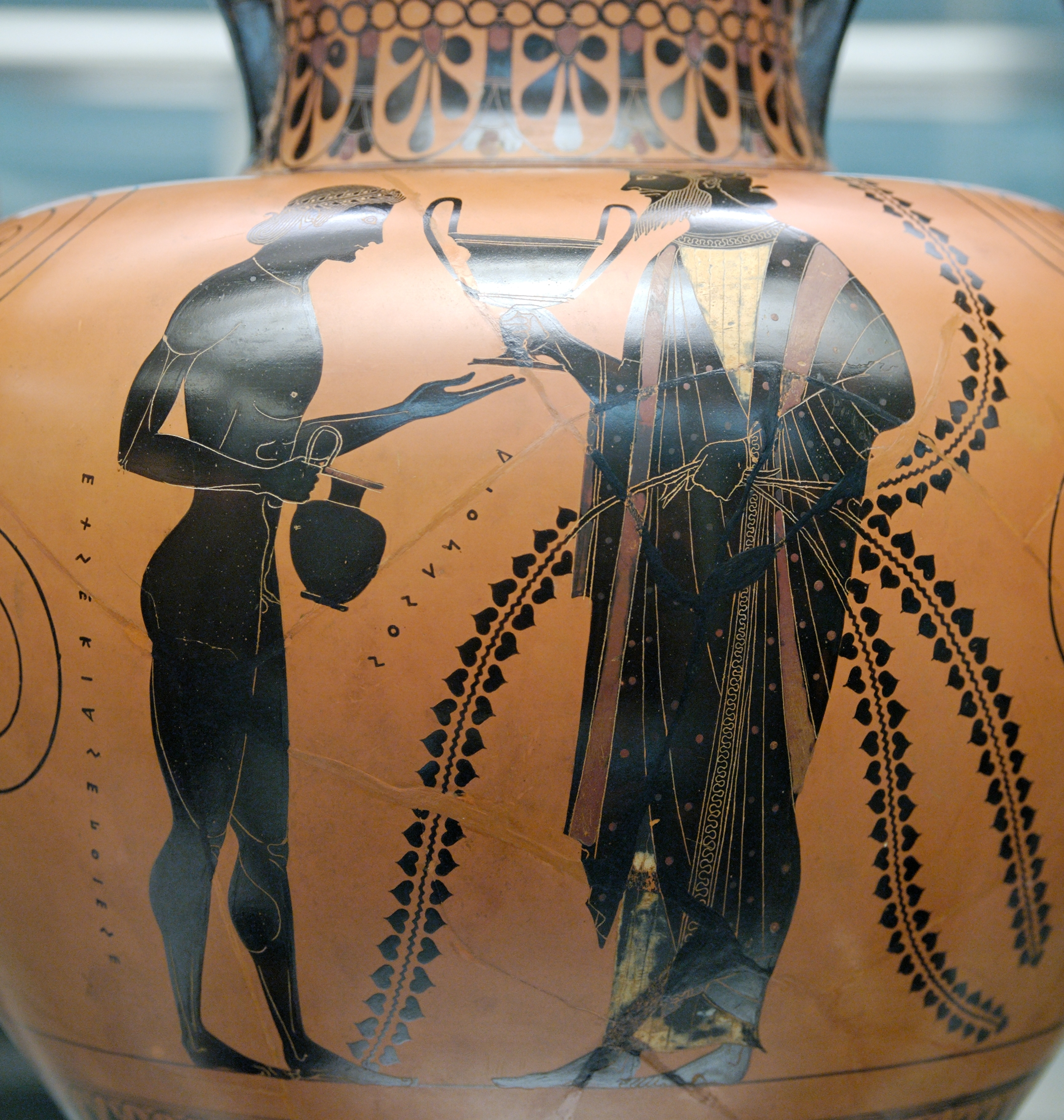
Dionysus teaching the art of wine-drinking to his son Oenopion, on an Attic black-figured amphora from Vulci (ca. 540-530 BC) by Exekias

In Greek mythology, Oenopion /ɪˈnoʊpiən/ (Ancient Greek: Οἰνοπίων, Oinopíōn, English translation: "wine drinker", "wine-rich" or "wine face") was a legendary king of Chios, and was said to have brought winemaking to the island, which was assigned to him by Rhadamanthys.

== Family ==
Oenopion was the son of the Cretan princess Ariadne by Dionysus. He was born on Lemnos. His brothers were Thoas, Staphylus, Latromis, Euanthes, and Tauropolis.

By Queen Helike, Oenopion had one daughter, called either Merópē, or Aërō by Parthenius. He also had several sons, namely Melas, Talus, Maron, Euanthes, Salagus and Athamas, who all sailed with him to Chios from Crete.

== Mythology ==
The most well known story of Oenopion is the one that deals with him receiving the famous giant hunter Orion as a guest, with Orion's subsequent attempt to violate his daughter. The story differs somewhat in different ancient sources; what follows is Hesiod's version. For the details, see Orion.

Orion walked to Chios over the Aegean, and Oenopion welcomed him with a banquet; Orion got drunk and assaulted Merope. In revenge, Oenopion stabbed out Orion's eyes, and then threw him off the island. Hephaestus took pity on the blind Orion and gave him his servant Cedalion as a guide. Cedalion guided him east, where the rising sun restored Orion's sight. Orion then decided to kill Oenopion, but the Chians had built the king an underground fortress, and Orion couldn't find him. (Other sources say it was an iron fortress, built by Hephaestus.) Orion then went to Crete.
