= Hyperes =

In Greek mythology, the name Hyperes (Ancient Greek: Ὑπέρης, gen. Ὑπέρητος) may refer to:

- Hyperes, an Arcadian prince as the son of King Lycaon and the eponym of Hyperesia in Achaea.
- Hyperes, a Boeotian son of Poseidon and the Pleiad Alcyone, and brother of Anthas. He was the father of Arethusa, mother of Abas by Poseidon. Hyperes and his brother Anthas reigned over what later became Troezen and were founders of the cities Hyperea and Anthea respectively. Two brands of Troezenian wine, Anthedonias and Hypereias, were believed to have been named after certain "Anthus and Hyperus", who apparently are the same figures. The island of Calauria, off the coast of Troezen, was likewise believed to have received from Hyperes the name of Hypereia. See also Hyperenor.
- Hyperes, another Boeotian as son of Melas and Eurycleia. He lived by a spring which was named Hypereia after him.
