= Orestes (mythology) =

In Greek mythology, Orestes (/ɒˈrɛstiːz/; Ancient Greek: Ὀρέστης, lit. 'mountain dweller', [oˈrestɛːs]) was the name of several figures, the most famous being Orestes, the son of Agamemnon and Clytemnestra.

Other figures named Orestes include:

- Orestes, one of the leaders of the satyrs who joined the army of Dionysus in his campaign against India.
- Orestes, son of river god Achelous and princess Perimede, daughter of King Aeolus of Thessaly. He was the brother of Hippodamas.
- Orestes, a Greek warrior slain by Hector and Ares during the Trojan War.
- Orestes, a Trojan soldier who attacked the Achaean wall together with Asius and was killed by Leonteus, a Lapith leader.
