= Chalciope (daughter of Aeetes) =

Colchian princess in Greek mythology

Chalciope (/ˌkælˈsaɪ.əpiː/; Ancient Greek: Χαλκιόπη, romanized: Khalkiópē, lit. 'bronze-face’ or ‘with the brass voice'), in Greek mythology, was a Colchian princess as the daughter of King Aeëtes. Acusilaus, Hesiod and Hesychius referred to her as Iophossa (Ιoφώσσης) while according to Pherecydes, she was called Euenia (Εύηνίαν).

== Family ==
Chalciope's mother was the Oceanid Idyia, and her siblings were the witch Medea and Absyrtus. She married Phrixus by whom she had the following sons:

- Argus, Phrontis, Melas and Cytisorus or
- Argus, Phrontides, Melas and Cylindrus or
- Argos, Phrontis, Melias, Sorus, Katis and Hellen
- some authors added Presbon.

Chalciope's marriage and family was recounted by her son Argus to Jason in the following lines:

“. . . And him (i.e. Phrixus) did Aeetes receive in his palace, and with gladness of heart gave him his daughter Chalciope in marriage without gifts of wooing. From those two are we sprung. But Phrixus died at last, an aged man, in the home of Aeetes; and we, giving heed to our father's behests, are journeying to Orchomenus to take the possessions of Athamas. And if thou dost desire to learn our names, this is Cytissorus, this Phrontis, and this Melas, and me ye may call Argus.”

— Apollonius of Rhodes, Argonautica, 2.1147-1156

== Mythology ==
Chalciope supposedly persuaded Medea to help Jason because her sons were rescued in the island of Dia by the Argonauts after they were shipwrecked.

The following recounts the encounter between Chalciope and her sons after their rescue by the heroes of the Argo:

. . . And she (i.e. Chalciope), beholding her sons among them, raised her hands aloft through joy; and so they likewise greeted their mother, and when they saw her embraced her in their gladness; and she with many sobs spoke thus: "After all then, ye were not destined to leave me in your heedlessness and to wander far; but fate has turned you back. Poor wretch that I am! What a yearning for Hellas from some woeful madness seized you at the behest of your father Phrixus. Bitter sorrows for my heart did he ordain when dying. And why should ye go to the city of Orchomenus, whoever this Orchomenus is, for the sake of Athamas' wealth, leaving your mother alone to bear her grief?"

— Apollonius of Rhodes, Argonautica, 3.256-267

When Aeetes was dethroned and banished by his brother Perses, Chalciope expressed great filial devotion and stayed by her father's side, even though he had killed her husband Phrixus whom he mistakenly feared to drive him away from his kingdom.
