= Ops (mythology) =

In Greek mythology, the name Ops (Ancient Greek: Ὤψ) may refer to:

- Ops (male), son of Peisenor and father of Eurycleia. He may or may not be the same as Ops, father of Melas.
- Ops (female), mother of Eurypylus by Euaemon. In some accounts, the mother of Eurypylus was called Deipyle (Deityche).
