= Agrius (son of Porthaon) =

Son of Porthaon

In Greek mythology, Agrius (/ˈæɡriəs/; Ancient Greek: Ἄγριος, romanized: Agrios, lit. 'wild' or 'savage') was the son of the Calydonian king Porthaon and Euryte, and the brother of Oeneus, Alcathous, Melas, Leucopeus, and Sterope.

== Family ==
Agrius was the father of six sons, namely Melanippus, Thersites, Onchestus, Prothous, Celeutor, Lycopeus, possibly all by Dia, daughter of Porthaon (which makes the wife technically his sister or half-sister). Alcathous may also be the son of Agrius, when Diodorus claimed that together with Lycopeus, he was killed by their cousin Tydeus who fled to Argos.

== Mythology ==
His sons overthrew Oeneus and gave the kingdom to their father. Agrius and his sons were themselves overthrown by Diomedes, who reinstated Oeneus as king. All the sons except Thersites were killed by Diomedes. The Bibliotheca places these events before the expedition of the Greeks against Troy, while Hyginus states that Diomedes, when he heard, after the fall of Troy, of the misfortune of his grandfather Oeneus, hastened back and expelled Agrius, who then committed suicide; according to others, Agrius and his sons were all slain by Diomedes.
