= Presbon =

In Greek mythology, the name Presbon (/ˈpréz.bɔːn/ or /ˈpres.von/; Ancient Greek: Πρέσβων, lit. 'elder, senior') may refer to:

- Presbon, a son of Phrixus and Chalciope (Iophassa), daughter of King Aeetes of Colchis, mentioned in few sources, and never enumerated alongside his brothers Argus, Phrontis, Melas and Cytisorus. Upon return from Colchis to Boeotia, he received his grandfather Athamas' kingdom back from the latter's adoptive heirs Haliartus and Coronus. The kingdom further passed over to his son Clymenus.
- Presbon, a son of Minyas and Clytodora.
- Presbon, father of Aspledon (Spledon) by Sterope.
- Presbon, the young son of Clymenus (Periclymenus), whom Harpalyce killed and served to Clymenus as a meal in revenge for the rape.
