= Peisenor =

Greek mythological figures

In Greek mythology, the name Peisenor or Pisenor (Ancient Greek: Πεισήνωρ) may refer to:

- Peisenor, a Centaur who attended the wedding of Pirithous and Hippodamia.
- Peisenor, the Trojan father of Cleitus and Chlemus, who were killed by Teucer and Meriones respectively.
- Peisenor, father of Ops and grandfather of Eurycleia.
- Peisenor, the herald of Telemachus.
