= Mount Tanagra =

Mountain in Greece

Mount Tanagra is a mountain in Greece.

Mount Tanagra was known as Mount Cerycius in Ancient Greece. According to Pausanias, it was associated with the Greek hero Orion and was identified as the location of his tomb. It has also been mentioned in ancient texts as the birthplace of Hermes.
