= Zanclus =

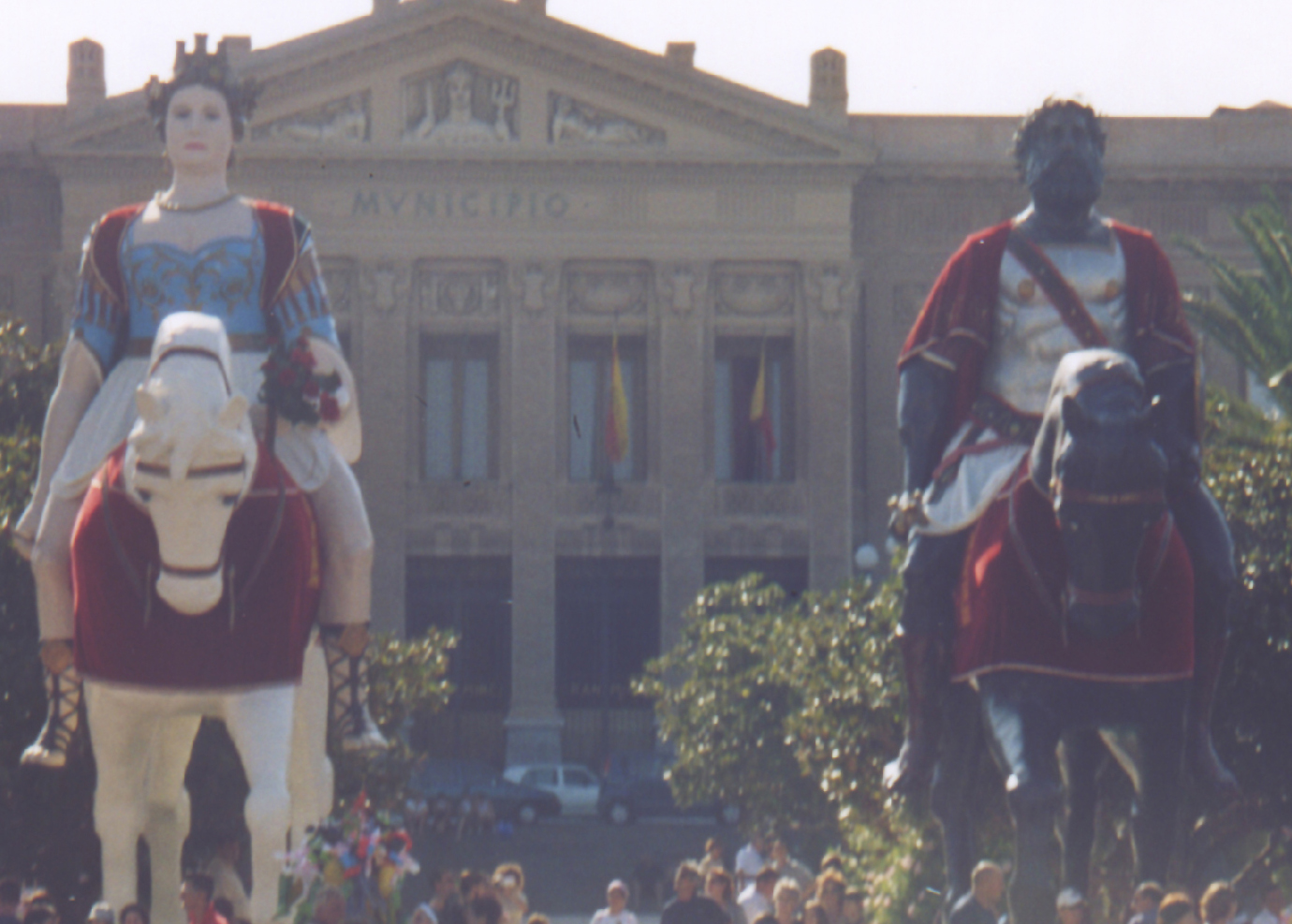
The Grifone figure (right of picture) has been identified with Zanclus.

Zanclus (Ancient Greek: Ζάγκλος; pronounced /ˈzæŋkləs/, ZANG-klus) is the legendary first king of the Sicilian city of Messina. He is mentioned in an etiological passage by Diodorus of Sicily, and has become a symbol of Messina. In modern Italian, the form is given as Zanclo.

Gegenus is recorded as the father of Zanclus. Diodorus writes of Zanclus as the supposed eponym of "Zancle" (Ancient Greek: Ζάγκλη, romanized: Zágklē) (the ancient name for Messina). The giant Orion is said to have helped Zanclus in building the city and the harbor.

Zanclus has been identified with the male "Grifone" figure of Messina's traditional Mata e Grifone procession. The earliest records, by Francesco Maurolico, record only one the male figure, and associate it with Zanclus. When Zanclus is identified with the male figure in modern times, his female partner is identified as the Titaness Rhea.

Stephanus of Byzantium also wrote about Zanclus, stating that Zancle could have been named either after him or the well Ζάγκλη.
