= Maron (mythology) =

Son of Evanthes in Greek mythology

Artwork on a Sicilian krater produced some time from 340-330 BCE, depicting Maron (right) handing Odysseus a goatskin filled with dark, sweet wine

In Greek mythology, Maron (/ˈmærɒn, ˈmærən/) or Maro (/ˈmæroʊ/; Ancient Greek: Μάρων) was the hero of sweet wine. He was an experienced man in the cultivation of the vine.

== Family ==
Maron was the son of Euanthes (some also call him a son of Oenopion, Silenus, and a pupil of Silenus), and grandson of Dionysus and Ariadne. As the grandson of Bacchus and the Cretan princess, Maron was nephew to Thoas, Staphylos and Eunous.

== Mythology ==
Maron was mentioned among the companions of Dionysus. The city Maroneia in Thrace was named after its founder Maron; there he was venerated in a sanctuary. The god Osiris (Dionysus) left Maron, who was now old, in that land to supervise the culture of the plants which he introduced to the city. "Maron who haunts the vines at Ismaros and, by planting and pruning them, makes them produce sweet wine, especially when farmers see Maron handsome and splendid, exhaling a breath sweet and smelling of wine."

Maron was also a priest of Apollo at Ismarus and the only one spared by the hero Odysseus when he pillaged the city. In Odyssey (9.200) before making Polyphemus drunk and fall asleep, Odysseus narrates:

With me I had a goat-skin of the dark, sweet wine, which Maro, son of Euanthes, had given me, the priest of Apollo, the god who used to watch over Ismarus. And he had given it me because we had protected him with his child and wife out of reverence; for he dwelt in a wooded grove of Phoebus Apollo. And he gave me splendid gifts: of well-wrought gold he gave me seven talents, and he gave me a mixing-bowl all of silver; and besides these, wine, wherewith he filled twelve jars in all, wine sweet and unmixed, a drink divine.
