= Leucopeus =

In Greek mythology, Leucopeus (Ancient Greek: Λευκωπεύς, romanized: Leukōpeús, lit. 'white-faced' or 'pale-faced') was a Calydonian prince as the son of King Porthaon and Euryte. He was the brother of Oeneus (successor of their father as king of Calydon), Agrius, Alcathous, Melas, and Sterope.
