= Perdix (drone) =

Type of aircraft

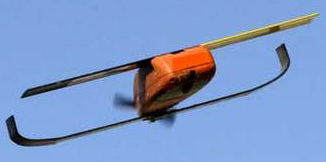
- Perdix UAV in testing

General information
- Type: Unmanned micro-air vehicle
- National origin: United States
- Manufacturer: MIT Lincoln Laboratory
- Designer: MIT
- Status: In testing
- Primary user: United States Department of Defense
- Number built: 670

History
- Manufactured: 2013 - present
- First flight: September 2014

Perdix drones are the main subject of an experimental project conducted by the Strategic Capabilities Office of the United States Department of Defense which aims to develop autonomous micro-drones to be used for unmanned aerial surveillance.

== Origin ==
The idea of intelligent micro-drones which could communicate with each other was pioneered by a group of students studying at the Aeronautics and Astronautics Department of the Massachusetts Institute of Technology in 2011. They were subsequently modified for military use in 2013 under the direction of the United States Department of Defense Strategic Capabilities Office.

The drone system was named after the character in Greek mythology of the same name.

== Autonomy ==
Each individual drone is not controlled in itself but instead it shares a collective, distributed "brain," travelling in leaderless "swarms," members of which can adapt to changes in drone numbers and remain co-ordinated with their counterparts. Having multiple micro-drones carrying out surveillance is tactically advantageous to simply having one large drone because it is easier for the micro-drones to dodge air defense systems. The drones have the ability to collectively determine whether they have completed a mission, leading some commentators to argue that Perdix drones are artificially intelligent.

== Testing ==
F/A18 jets drop Perdix drones over California in a test exercise.

The first operational test of the militarized Perdix drones was conducted by the U.S. Air Force Test Pilot School in September 2014 over Edwards Air Force Base. The drones were placed in the flare canisters of F-16 Fighting Falcon and deployed to operate at a lower altitude. A year later, in September 2015, 90 Perdix missions were flown over Alaska to test maritime surveillance capabilities.

In October 2016, 103 Perdix drones were dropped from three F/A-18 Super Hornet fighter jets in a joint effort with the US Naval Air Systems Command over their base at China Lake, California. As with earlier tests, the drones were packed into flare canisters for the jets to eject. The test was a success and elicited significant media coverage when announced on 9 January 2017.

These tests conclude that the drones can be safely launched at a speed of Mach 0.6 and in temperatures as low as −10 °C (14 °F).

Photographers shooting a feature of the drones for CBS television program 60 Minutes reportedly almost abandoned attempts to film the drones as their size and speed made getting a focussed image difficult.

== Design ==
Perdix drones have two sets of wings which are straddled by a plastic body containing a lithium battery and a small camera. Propulsion is provided by a 2.6 inches (66 mm) propeller at the rear. 3D printing is used to create Perdix drones' bodies while the onboard software can be updated to enable refinements and improvements to be made without having to manufacture a new drone. The Perdix software is currently in its sixth generation and the Department of Defense aims to have the capability to produce the drones in batches of 1,000 in the near future.

== Specifications ==
The published specifications of Perdix drones are listed below.

=== General characteristics ===
- Length: 6.5 inches / 165mm
- Wingspan: 11.8 inches / 300mm
- Weight: 290 grams
- Propeller diameter: 2.6 inches / 66mm

=== Performance ===
- Maximum speed: 70 mph / 113 km/h
- Endurance: 20 minutes

== See also ==
- MIT discoveries and innovation
- Defense Innovation Unit Experimental
- Micro air vehicle
