= Halirrhothius =

Son of Poseidon in Greek mythology

Halirrhothius (/ˌhælɪˈroʊθiəs/; Ancient Greek: Ἁλιρρόθιος, romanized: Halirrhóthios, lit. 'sea-foam') was the Athenian son of Poseidon and Euryte or Bathycleia in Greek mythology. He was also called the son of Perieres and husband of Alcyone who bore him two sons, Serus and Alazygus. Another son of Halirrhothius, Samos of Mantinea was the victor of the four-horse chariot during the first Olympic games established by Heracles.

== Mythology ==
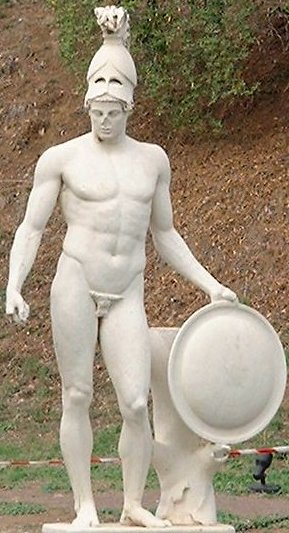
Statue of Ares

When Halirrhothius raped Alcippe, Ares's daughter by Aglaulus, Ares killed him. Ares was then tried for this in a court made up of his fellow gods. The trial was held on a hill adjacent to the Acropolis of Athens, known as the Areopagus. Ares was acquitted. According to the Parian Chronicle this event took place in 1532/1 BC during the reign of Cranaus.

In another version of the myth, Halirrhothius was sent by his father to cut down the olive that had grown out of the spear of Athena. As he raised his axe, it fell out of his hand and mortally wounded him. The olive was called "fatal" (moros in Greek, which was used as folk-etymology for moria, the name of the sacred olive trees) from that circumstance. Servius adds that Poseidon was in such great grief of his son's passing, that he accused Ares of murder, and the matter was settled on the Areopagus.

== See also ==
- Tereus
- Proetus
