= Cicones =

Thracian tribe

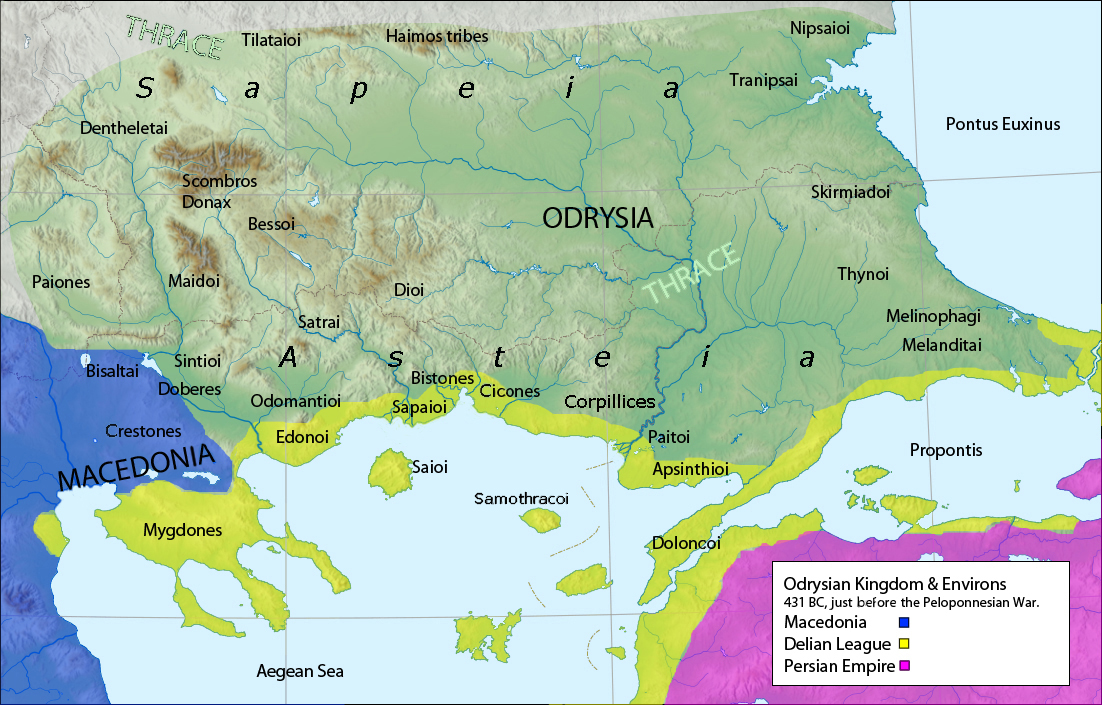
Approximate location of the Cicones

The Cicones (/ˈsɪkəˌniːz/; Ancient Greek: Κίκονες, romanized: Kíkones) or Ciconians /sɪˈkoʊniənz/ were a Homeric Thracian tribe, whose stronghold in the time of Odysseus was the town of Ismara (or Ismarus), located at the foot of mount Ismara, on the south coast of Thrace (in modern Greece).

They are mentioned in book two of the Iliad as having joined the war on the side of the Trojans, led by Euphemus. In book nine of Homer's Odyssey, Odysseus and his men take Ismara by surprise and slay most of the Ciconian men they come across, taking Ciconian women as slaves. Later Ciconian reinforcements arrive and attack the invading Achaeans, killing so many of them that Odysseus and his men are forced to flee in their ships. Six men of each of Odysseus's ships were killed:

When I had set sail thence the wind took me first to Ismarus, which is the city of the Cicons. There I sacked the town and put the people to the sword. We took their wives and also much booty which we divided equitably amongst us, so that none might have reason to complain. I then said that we had better make off at once, but my men very foolishly would not obey me, so they stayed there drinking much wine and killing great numbers of sheep and oxen on the sea shore. Meanwhile the Cicons cried out for help to other Cicons who lived inland. These were more in number, and stronger, and they were more skilled in the art of war, for they could fight, either from chariots or on foot as the occasion served; in the morning, therefore, they came as thick as leaves and bloom in summer, and the hand of heaven was against us, so that we were hard pressed. They set the battle in array near the ships, and the hosts aimed their bronze-shod spears at one another. So long as the day waxed and it was still morning, we held our own against them, though they were more in number than we; but as the sun went down, towards the time when men loose their oxen, the Cicons got the better of us, and we lost half a dozen men from every ship we had; so we got away with those that were left.

The Cicones are also referred to in the book of poems Metamorphoses by Ovid. They are mentioned in book VI when he writes of Boreas and Orithyia, when Ovid states:

He bore her off; and as he flew he felt the flames of love gain force on force; he did not curbe his course across the air until he'd reach the northern lands and city of the Cicones.

They are mentioned again in book XV when Ovid states, "And where Cicones live there is a river which as one drinks it down turns flesh to stone, and turns to marble everything you touch."

Orpheus, the Thracian lyre-player who sought his lover Eurydice in the underworld, was said to have been torn to pieces by Ciconian women after he rejected their advances, subsequently being reincarnated as a swan, or, according to Ovid, his disembodied head floating on the sea until it came to rest on the island of Lesbos, where it continued to speak, uttering prophecies.

In classical times and in a historical context they go into obscurity. Non mythical instances of them occur in Herodotus (5th century BC) as he writes of their land that Xerxes's army passed by. The tribe itself is thought to have disappeared early on.

Eumenes of Cardia lived there for a while after being retrieved from a sunk slave ship heading to Olbia, Ukraine.

== See also ==
- Linus
- List of ancient tribes in Thrace and Dacia
