= Hippodamas (mythology) =

In Greek mythology, Hippodamas (/hɪˈpɒdəməs/ hi-POD-ə-məs; Ancient Greek: Ἱπποδάμας, gen. Ἱπποδάμαντος, lit. 'he who masters horses' or 'one who subdues horses') may refer to the following characters:

- Hippodamas, son of the river-god Achelous and princess Perimede, daughter of King Aeolus of Thessaly. He was the brother of Orestes and father of Euryte, wife of Porthaon.
- Hippodamas, father of Perimele. He pushed his daughter off a cliff when he discovered that she was having a love affair with Achelous.
- Hippodamas, a Trojan prince and son of King Priam of Troy. He was killed by Ajax the Great.
- Hippodamas, a Trojan soldier who was killed by Odysseus.
- Hippodamas, another Trojan, was killed by Achilles.
