= Telesarchus (military commander) =

3rd-century BC Syro-Macedonian military commander

Telesarchus (Greek: Τελέσαρχος, Telesarkhos) was a Syro-Macedonian military commander from the region along the Orontes river. In 279 BC, Antiochus I sent him with a force of 500 men against invading Gauls led by Brennus.

Telesarchus was in command of a garrison that defended one of two covert routes over Mount Oeta. His mission was to prevent the plundering of the Temple of Athene, located within the district of Trachis and a particularly attractive target because of the richness of the offerings it held. Although Telesarchus succeeded in turning away the Gauls, he was killed in battle. Pausanias calls him "remarkably zealous in the cause of Greece". The Gauls who took the other route over Oeta went on to destroy Callium.

== See also ==
- Gallic invasion of the Balkans

== Sources ==
- Pausanias, Guide to Greece 10.20.3 and 10.22.1.
