= Sterope =

Name of multiple Greek mythological figures

Sterope (/ˈstɛrəpiː/; Ancient Greek: Στερόπη, [sterópɛː], from στεροπή, steropē, lightning) was the name of several individuals in Greek mythology:

- Sterope (or Asterope), one of the Pleiades and the wife of Oenomaus (or his mother by Ares).
- Sterope, a Pleuronian princess as the daughter of King Pleuron and Xanthippe. She was the sister of Agenor, Stratonice and Laophonte.
- Sterope, a Calydonian princess as the daughter of King Porthaon and Euryte or Laothoe. She was the sister of Oeneus, Agrius, Melas, Leucopeus, Stratonice and Eurythemiste. Sterope was sometimes said to be the mother of the Sirens by Achelous.
- Sterope, an Arcadian princess as the daughter of Cepheus, king of Tegea.
- Sterope, mother of Aspledon by Presbon. Their son was the eponymous founder of Aspledon, a Minyan city in Boeotia .
- Sterope, a princess of Iolcus as the daughter of King Acastus by either Astydamia or Hippolyte.
- Sterope, daughter of Helios and wife of King Eurypylus of Cyrene by whom she became the mother of Lycaon and Leucippus.
- Sterope, one of the Maenads. She followed Dionysus during the god's Indian campaign but was slain by Morrheus.
- Sterope, one of the horses of Helios.

Sterope is also the name of one of the stars in the Pleiades star cluster.
