= Cynosura (nymph) =

Greek mythological figure

In Greek mythology, Cynosura (Ancient Greek: Κυνοσούρα, romanized: Kunosoúra, lit. 'dog's tail' κυνός οὐρά, pronounced [kynosǔːraː]) is the name of an Idaean nymph from the island Crete who brought up a young Zeus during his early years when he hid from his father Cronus, and ended up among the stars.

== Mythology ==
Along with fellow nymph Helice, Cynosura put the infant Zeus in a cave and nurtured him in Ida, in Crete, while the Dictaean Curetes deceived Cronus so he would not devour his son. One day, Cronus happened to visit Crete, so Zeus hid the nymphs by transforming them both into bears, as he changed his shape into that of a dragon, in order to go undetected by Cronus. Eventually, after he became king of the gods, he honoured his two nurses by placing them both in the sky as constellations, and Cynosura became Ursa Minor, which was a common name for the constellation in Ancient Greece. The most common origin myth for the two bear constellations, however, was that of Callisto, a follower of Artemis, and her son Arcas.

The origin of the word "Cynosura"/"dog's tail" is unknown, as it does not connect to the theme of the constellation, and no other constellation fitting the description exists. It has been argued that the derivation from the word for dog is false.

== See also ==
- Orion
- Rhea
- Melissa

== Bibliography ==
- Allen, Richard Hinckley (1899). Star-names and their meanings. New York, Leipzig: G.E. Stechert.
- A. W. Mair, G. R. Mair (1921). Callimachus, Lycophron, Aratus. Hymns and Epigrams. Lycophron: Alexandra. Aratus: Phaenomena. Vol. Loeb Classical Library 129. Cambridge, MA: Harvard University Press.
- Gaius Julius Hyginus, Astronomica from The Myths of Hyginus translated and edited by Mary Grant. University of Kansas Publications in Humanistic Studies. Online version at the Topos Text Project.
- Hard, Robin (2015). Constellation Myths: With Aratus's 'Phaenomena'. Oxford University Press. ISBN 978-0-19-871698-3.
- Maurus Servius Honoratus, In Vergilii carmina comentarii. Servii Grammatici qui feruntur in Vergilii carmina commentarii; recensuerunt Georgius Thilo et Hermannus Hagen. Georgius Thilo. Leipzig. B. G. Teubner. 1881. Online version at the Perseus Digital Library.
- Sider, David (2017). Hellenistic Poetry: A Selection. University of Michigan Press. ISBN 9780472053131.
- Smith, William, A Dictionary of Greek and Roman Biography and Mythology, London. John Murray: printed by Spottiswoode and Co., New-Street Square and Parliament Street, 1873.
