= Perdix (mythology) =

Greek mythological figure

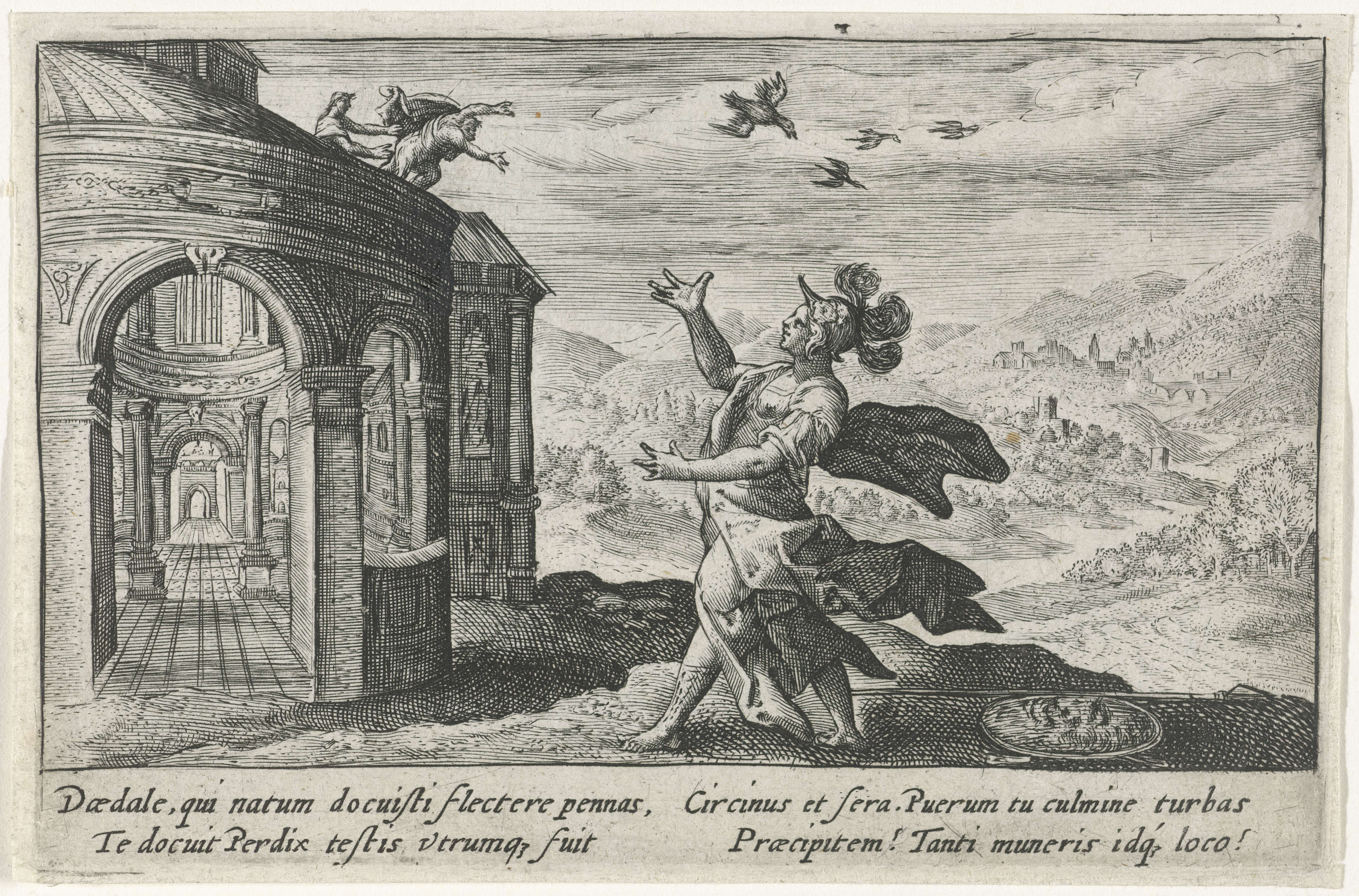
Athena changes Perdix into a bird (Crispijn the Elder)

Perdix (Ancient Greek: Πέρδιξ meaning "partridge") was, in some sources, a nephew and student of Daedalus in Greek mythology, claimed to have invented the saw and the compass. In other sources, Perdix was the name of Daedalus's sister, and her inventor son was named Talos, Kalos, or Attalus.

== Mythology ==
In Ovid's account of the myth in his Metamorphoses, Daedalus' sister had placed her son Perdix under his charge to be taught the mechanical arts. Over the years his talent grew to rival that of Daedalus himself. After Perdix invented a saw and a compass, Daedalus was so envious of his nephew's accomplishments that he pushed him from a temple tower sacred to Minerva and then claimed that Perdix had accidentally fallen. Minerva, however, prevented Perdix falling to his death by changing him into a bird called after his name, the perdix (partridge).

In the Chiliades, the Byzantine scholar John Tzetzes relates part of the same story, but names the child as Attalus and his mother as Perdix. Daedalus kills Attalus after the latter invents a saw, and is pushed by Daedalus from a tower. No mention is made of an intervention by Minerva or of a metamorphosis into a bird.

Apollodorus likewise names Perdix as the sister of Daedalus, and names her son as Talos. In Apollodorus' account, Daedalus murders Talos after Talos' invention of the saw by throwing him from the Acropolis. However, Talos' body is discovered and Daedalus is tried at the Areopagus for his murder. After being found guilty, Daedalus flees to King Minos. Hyginus names the child as Perdix, but shares the same details as Apollodorus regarding the invention of the saw, the murder of the child, and Daedalus' subsequent exile to Crete. Pausanias mentions the story in his Description of Greece, but names the child as Kalos and omits the name of the mother and the details of the murder and its discovery. Pausanias also locates a tomb of Kalos is somewhere between the Acropolis and the theatre. In an entry in the Byzantine encyclopaedic lexicon, the Suda, relating to a shrine to Perdix near the Acropolis, the story related is that Daedalus killed the child – named as Kalos – by throwing him from the Acropolis, and Perdix, his mother, in her grief then hanged herself, after which the Athenians worshipped her.
