= Merope (daughter of Oenopion) =

Character in Greek mythology

- Princess of Chios
- Spouse: Orion (fiancé)
- Father: King Oenopion or King Minos
- Mother: Helike

Merope (Ancient Greek: Μερόπη, romanized: Merópē, lit. 'with her face turned', derived from μέρος meros "part" and ὤψ ops "face, eye"; pronounced /ˈmɛrəpiː/, MEH-roh-pee) was a mortal princess in Greek mythology, who was loved by the hunter Orion and was his fiancée. She is called Haero by Parthenius of Nicaea.

== Family ==
Merope was a daughter of King Oenopion, who was a legendary ruler of Chios and son of Princess Ariadne. He was said to have brought winemaking to the island. Merope's mother was the nymph Helike. She was a sister to Melas, Talus, Euanthes, Salagus and Athamas.

== Merope and Orion ==
The story of Oenopion's daughter differs somewhat in different ancient sources. The hunter Orion married a lovely woman called Side and when she was punished by Hera, he walked to Chios over the Aegean, and Oenopion welcomed him with a banquet.

Merope was beloved by Orion but he did not have the approval of Oenopion. Orion got drunk and slept with or assaulted Merope. In revenge, Oenopion stabbed out Orion's eyes, and then threw him off the island.

== Theories ==
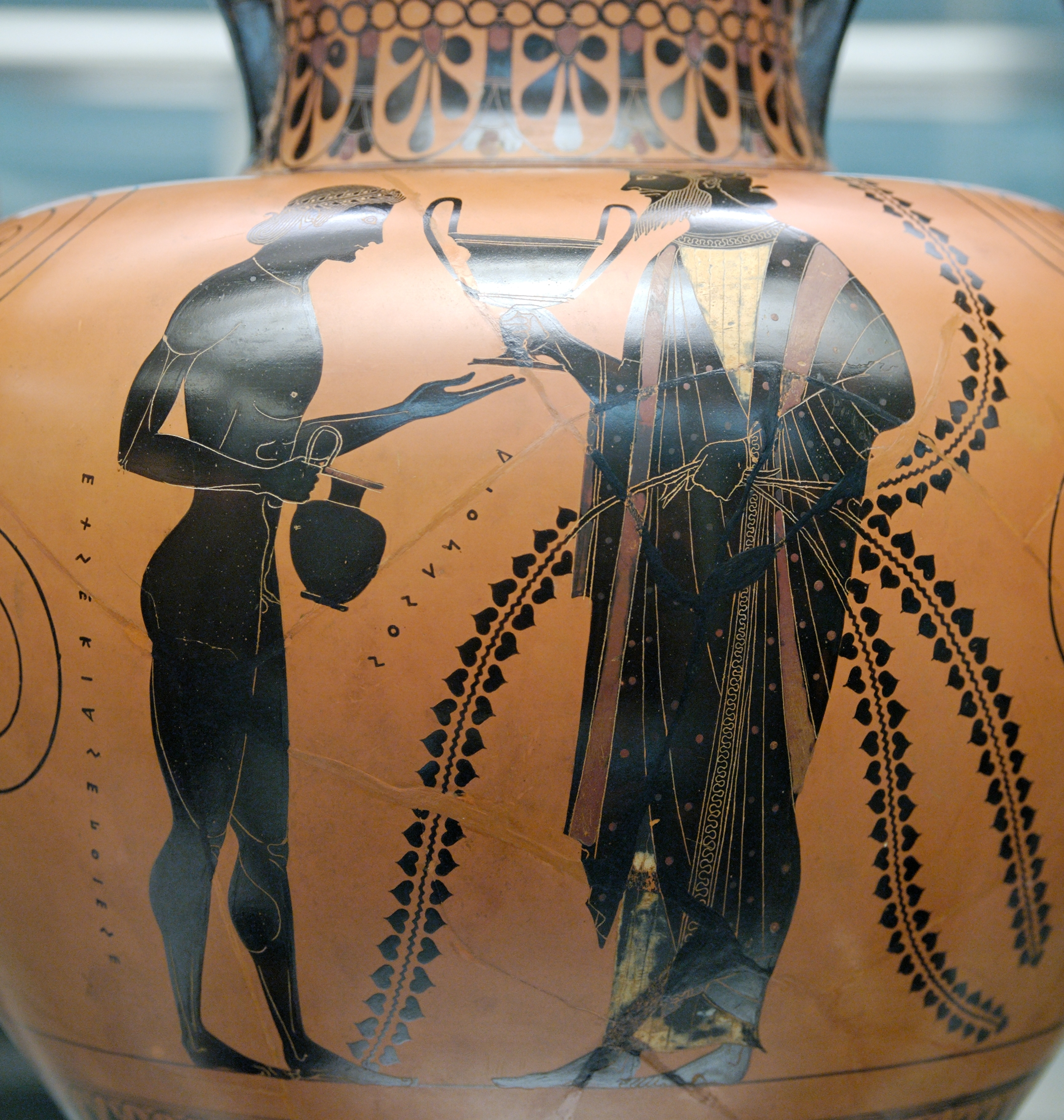
Merope's father Oenopion and his father, god Dionysus, on an Attic black-figured amphora from Volci (ca. 540-530 BC) by Exekias

The story of Orion and Merope varies. One source refers to Merope as the wife of Oenopion and not his daughter. Another refers to Merope as the daughter of King Minos, who was a father of Merope's grandmother.

The Hungarian mythographer Károly Kerényi, one of the founders of the modern study of mythology, wrote about Merope in Gods of the Greeks. Kerényi portrays Orion as a giant born outside his mother. He placed great stress on the variant in which Merope is the wife of Oenopion. He sees this as the remnant of a lost form of the myth in which Merope was Orion's mother (converted by later generations to his stepmother).

== In popular culture ==
The 2002 opera Galileo Galilei by American composer Philip Glass includes an opera within an opera piece between Orion and Merope.
