= Melas (mythology) =

Name in Greek mythology

In Greek mythology, the name Melas (Ancient Greek: Μέλας, romanized: Mélas, lit. 'black, dark') refers to a number of characters.

- Melas, son of Poseidon and an unnamed nymph of Chios, brother of Agelus. He may or may not be identical to Melas, son of Poseidon, who was said to have given his name to the river Melas in Egypt, which was later renamed Nile.
- Melas, a Calydonian prince as one of the sons of King Porthaon and Euryte, and thus, brother of Oeneus, Agrius, Alcathous, Leucopeus and Sterope. He was the father of Pheneus, Euryalus, Hyperlaus, Antiochus, Eumedes, Sternops, Xanthippus and Sthenelaus, who were all slain by Tydeus for plotting against their uncle Oeneus.
- Melas, a son of Phrixus and Chalciope, who was rescued with his brothers by Jason and the Argonauts. By Eurycleia, daughter of Athamas and Themisto, he became the father of Hyperes.
- Melas, son of Licymnius. He and his brother Argius accompanied Heracles in his campaign against Eurytus, and both fell in the battle.
- Melas, son of Oenopion and possibly the nymph Helice. He was the brother of Talus, Euanthes, Salagus, Athamas and Merope (Aero). He, together with his father and brothers, sailed from Crete to Chios and settled there.
- Melas, son of Antasus, from Gonusa near Sicyon. He expressed desire to join the Dorians in their expedition against Corinth. Aletes consulted the oracle of Apollo about him; the god expressed disapproval, and Aletes at first told Melas to go and search for other allies among the Greeks, but then changed his mind and, neglecting the prophecy, let him join. Melas was the ancestor of Cypselus.
- Melas, son of Ops. Athena assumed his shape to persuade Teuthis not to withdraw his army from Aulis. Teuthis, outraged, hit whom he took for Melas with a spear and did return home. Later, he saw the wounded goddess in a dream; he was then struck with a wasting disease, and his country suffered from famine.
- Melas, one of the Tyrrhenian pirates who attempted to delude Dionysus but were transformed into dolphins by him.
- Melas, who led settlers from Argos, along with Areuanias of Troezen, to found the colony of Halicarnassus.
