= Telesarchus =

Ancient Greek writer and historian

Telesarchus or Telesarch (Greek: Τελέσαρχος, Telesarkhos) is a little-attested Greek author who wrote a work on the early history of Argolis, called the Argolicum or Argolica. He is mentioned by Sextus Empiricus and scholia on Homer and on Euripides' Alcestis. The availability of his writings was limited even among the Romans. There is an edition of Scholia in Euripidem (which includes scholia on Alcestis) edited by Eduard Schwartz. Internet Archive. This gives evidence that the scholia tradition mentioning authors like Telesarchus was collected and studied in 19th-century scholarship. While it doesn’t necessarily present a new fact about Telesarchus himself, it supports the existence of a scholia witness tradition.
