= Argus (mythology) =

Set of mythological Greek characters

In Greek mythology, Argus or Argos (/ˈɑːrɡəs/; Ancient Greek: Ἄργος Argos) may refer to the following personages

- Argus Panoptes (Argus "All-Eyes"), a giant with a hundred eyes.
- Argus, king of Argos, son of Zeus (or Phoroneus) and Niobe (Argive).
- Argus, son of Callirhoe and Piras (son of the above Argus) and brother to Arestorides and Triops.
- Argus, son of Phineus and Danaë, in a rare variant of the myth in which she and her two sons (the other being Argeus) travel to Italy.
- Argus, builder of the ship Argo in the tale of the Argonauts.
- Argus, eldest son of Phrixus and Chalciope (Iophassa), and husband of Perimele, daughter of Admetus and Alcestis. By her, he became the father of Magnes, the father of Hymenaios. Argus was erroneously conflated with the above Argus Arestorides who was the shipwright of the Argo and counted as one of the Argonauts.
- Argus, a son of Jason. He was loved by Heracles and because of him the hero joined Jason and the Argonauts.
- Argus, son of Pan and among the Pans who came to join Dionysus in his campaign against India.
- Argus, a warrior in the army of the Seven against Thebes, who was killed by Hypseus, son of Asopus.
- Argus, son of Abas and one of the defenders of Thebes in the war of the Seven against Thebes. He was killed by Parthenopaeus, son of Atalanta.
- Argus or Argos (dog), the faithful dog of Odysseus.
- Argus, one of Actaeon's dogs

== See also ==
- Argeus (mythology)
