= Ismarus (Thrace) =

Ancient site in Greece

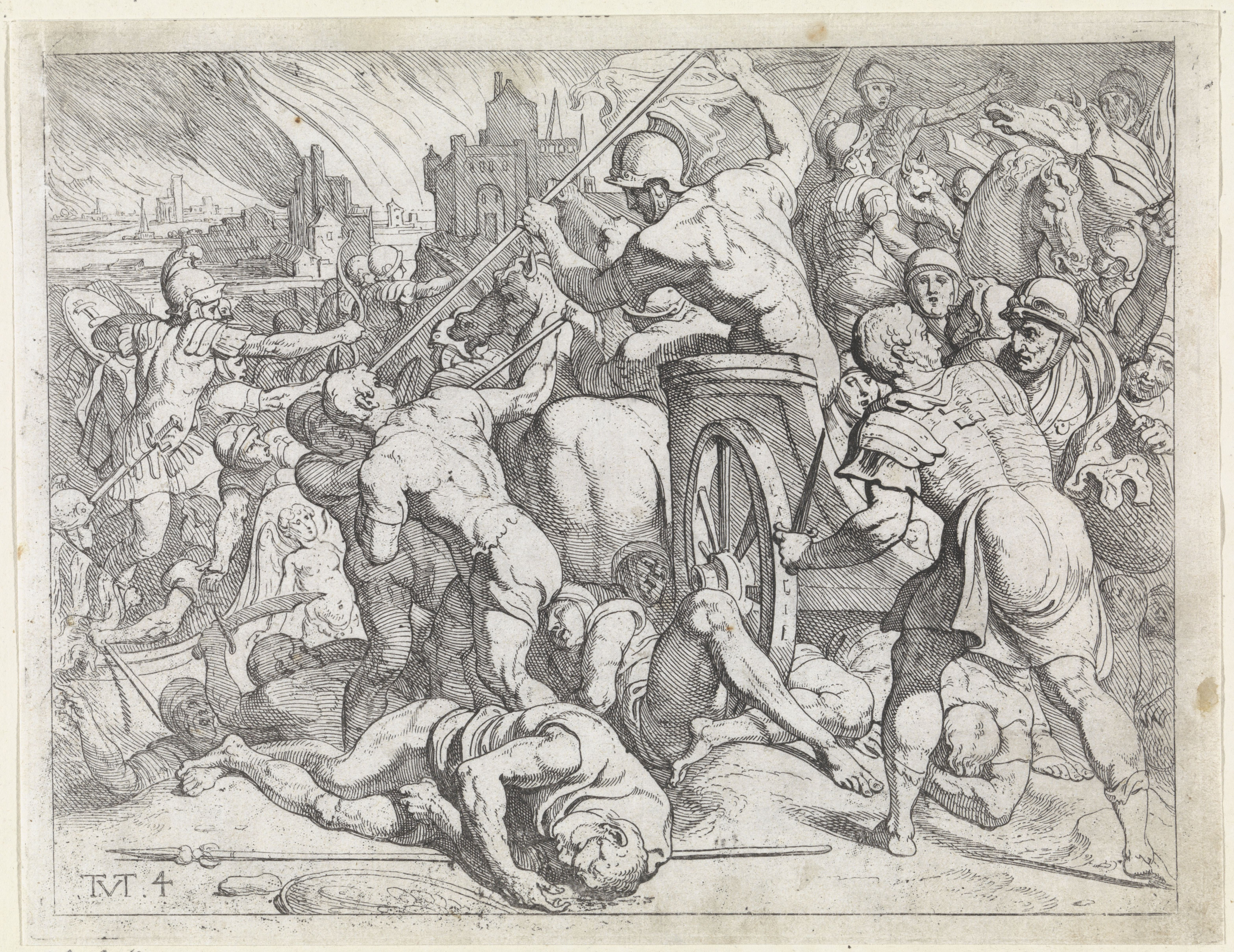
Odysseus and his men fighting the Cicones —allies of the Trojans— during the sacking of their city. After seizing goods and women, Odysseus is driven back by allies of the Cicones.

Ismarus or Ismaros (Ancient Greek: Ἴσμαρος) was a city of the Cicones, in ancient Thrace, mentioned by Homer in the Odyssey.

== Homeric Ismarus ==
According to Book 9 of the Odyssey, following their departure from Troy, after winning the Trojan War, in which the Cicones had been allies of the Trojans, Odysseus and his companions are blown off course to Ismaros. They sack the town, kill most of the men and divide the women and plunder among themselves, then begin to feast, despite Odysseus' advice that they leave immediately. Fugitives from this raid rouse others of the Cicones living inland, who gather an army to oppose Odysseus and his men. They appear in the morning in great numbers. Odysseus manages to escape, although he loses several men in the process. He embarks with the survivors and continues his journey home to Ithaca.

While at Ismaros, Odysseus spares Maron, the son of Euanthes and the priest of Apollo, and his family, out of respect for the god Apollo. Because of this, Maron gifts him a "goatskin bottle of black wine", some gold, and a mixing bowl. The wine was a strong and divine drink, as for each cup of wine, 20 times as much water was added to it to dilute it. He uses this wine to lull the Cyclops Polyphemus to sleep.

== Historic Ismarus ==
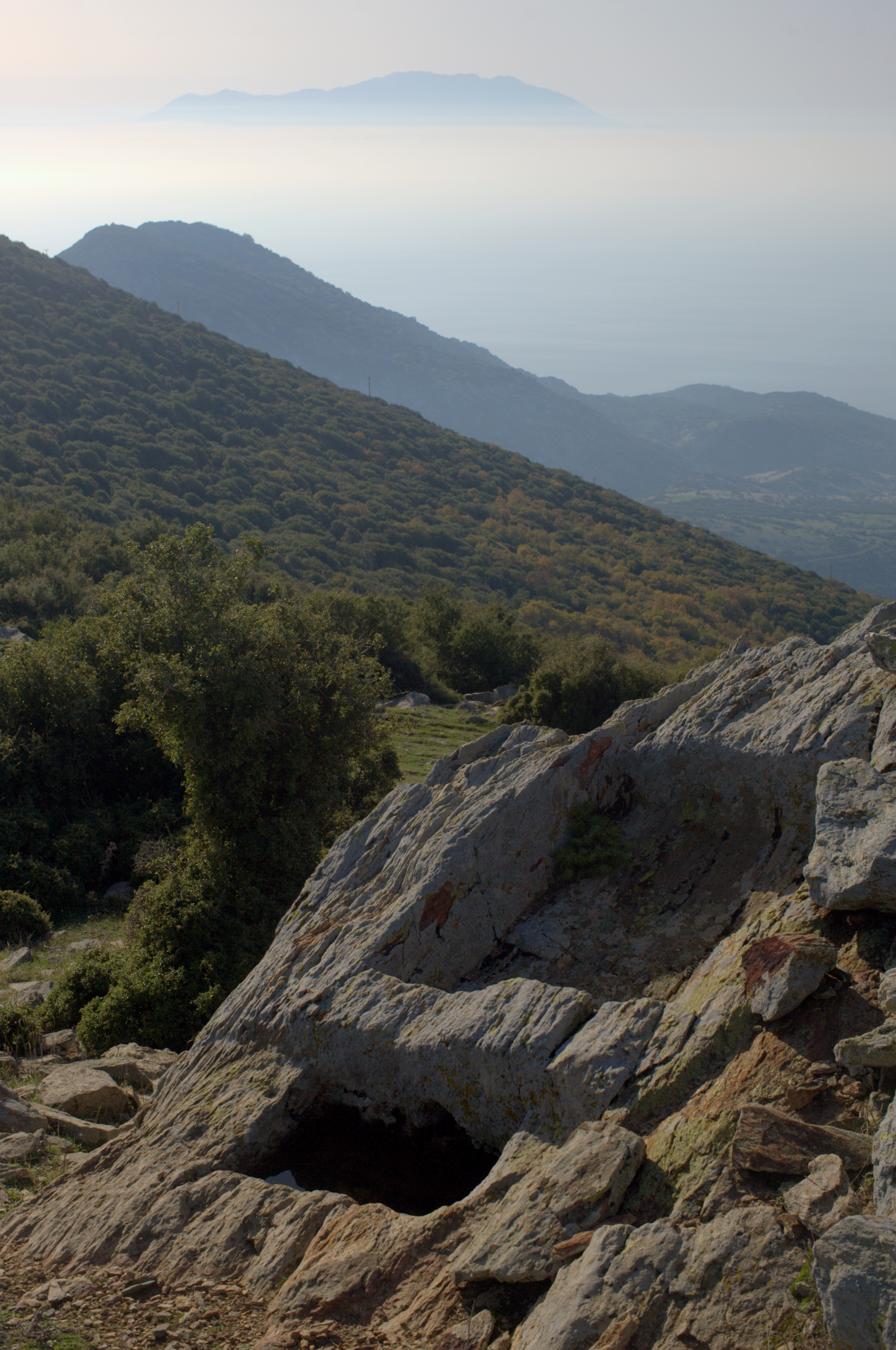
Ismarus mountain; Samothrace is visible to the south. It is uncertain if this mountain is the same Ismaros as Homer's Ismaros.

Ismarus was situated on a mountain of the same name, east of lake Ismaris, on the southeast coast of Thrace. The district about Ismarus produced wine which was highly esteemed. Pliny the Elder refers to the town as Ismaron; Virgil refers to it as Ismara.

Although Lake Ismaris is identified with the modern Lake Mitrikon; Ismarus' site is unlocated.
