= Orion (mythology) =

Giant huntsman in Greek mythology

Ancient Roman mosaic depicting the transformation of Orion into the constellation from the House of Orion in Pompeii.

In Greek mythology, Orion (/əˈraɪən/; : Ancient Greek: Ὠρίων or Ὠαρίων, romanized: Ōríōn) was a giant huntsman whom Zeus or Artemis placed among the stars as a constellation. He was venerated as a hero in the region of Boeotia, and there is one etiological passage which says that Orion was responsible for the present shape of the Strait of Sicily.

Ancient sources tell several, often conflicting, stories about Orion. Two major versions describe his birth, and several accounts relate his death. Other key episodes in his life include his visits to Chios and Lemnos and his relationship to Artemis. Most stories about him are recorded in incidental allusions and in fairly obscure later writings. No great poet standardized the myth.

Orion is mentioned in the oldest surviving works of Greek literature. In Homer's Iliad he is described as a constellation, and the star Sirius is mentioned as his dog. In the Odyssey, Odysseus sees him hunting in the underworld with a bronze club, a great slayer of animals. He is also mentioned as a constellation, as the lover of Eos, as slain by Artemis, and as the most handsome of the earthborn. In the Works and Days of Hesiod, Orion is also a constellation, one whose rising and setting with the sun is used to reckon the year, and chases the Pleiades.

== Mythology ==
=== Early life and family ===
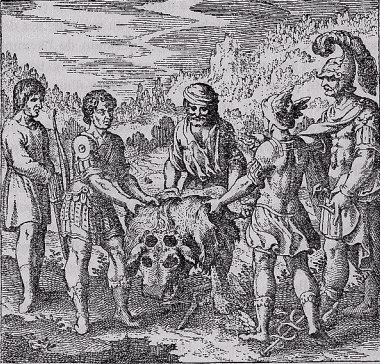
Apollo, Vulcan and Mercury conceive Orion in an allegory of the three-fathered "philosophical child". The artist stands at the left; Mars at right. Published in 1617.

The most common version of Orion's parentage presents him as the son of Poseidon. Orion's mother is usually identified as a daughter of Minos, either named Euryale, Brylle, or Hyeles. He was a giant in stature and, from his father, he inherited the ability to walk on water. Ovid and Pseudo-Apollodorus state Orion's first wife was Side, whom Hera threw into Hades for rivalling her in beauty.

Another version of Orion's birth, preserved in scholia and later mythographers, credits him as autochthonous. Here the gods Zeus, Hermes, and Poseidon come to visit Hyrieus of Tanagra, who roasts a whole bull for them. When they offer him a favor, he asks for a son. The gods take the bull's hide and urinate into it and bury it in the earth. Ten lunations later, Hyrieus digs up the hole and finds the infant Orion. There are several references to Hyrieus as the father of Orion that connect him to various places in Boeotia, including Hyria; this may well be the original story (although not the first attested), since Hyrieus is presumably the eponym of Hyria. He is also called Oeneus, although he is not the Calydonian Oeneus.

Giovanni Boccaccio, citing a lost Latin writer, describes Orion as the son of Oenopion, king of Sicily, and writes that he was seduced by Venus as a youth. He also states that, by his sister Candiope, he fathered a son, Hippologus. Oenopion, learning of the incestuous union, banished the family to Thrace, where Orion and Candiope had a second son, Dryas, who is mentioned in Statius' Thebaid.

=== Chios ===
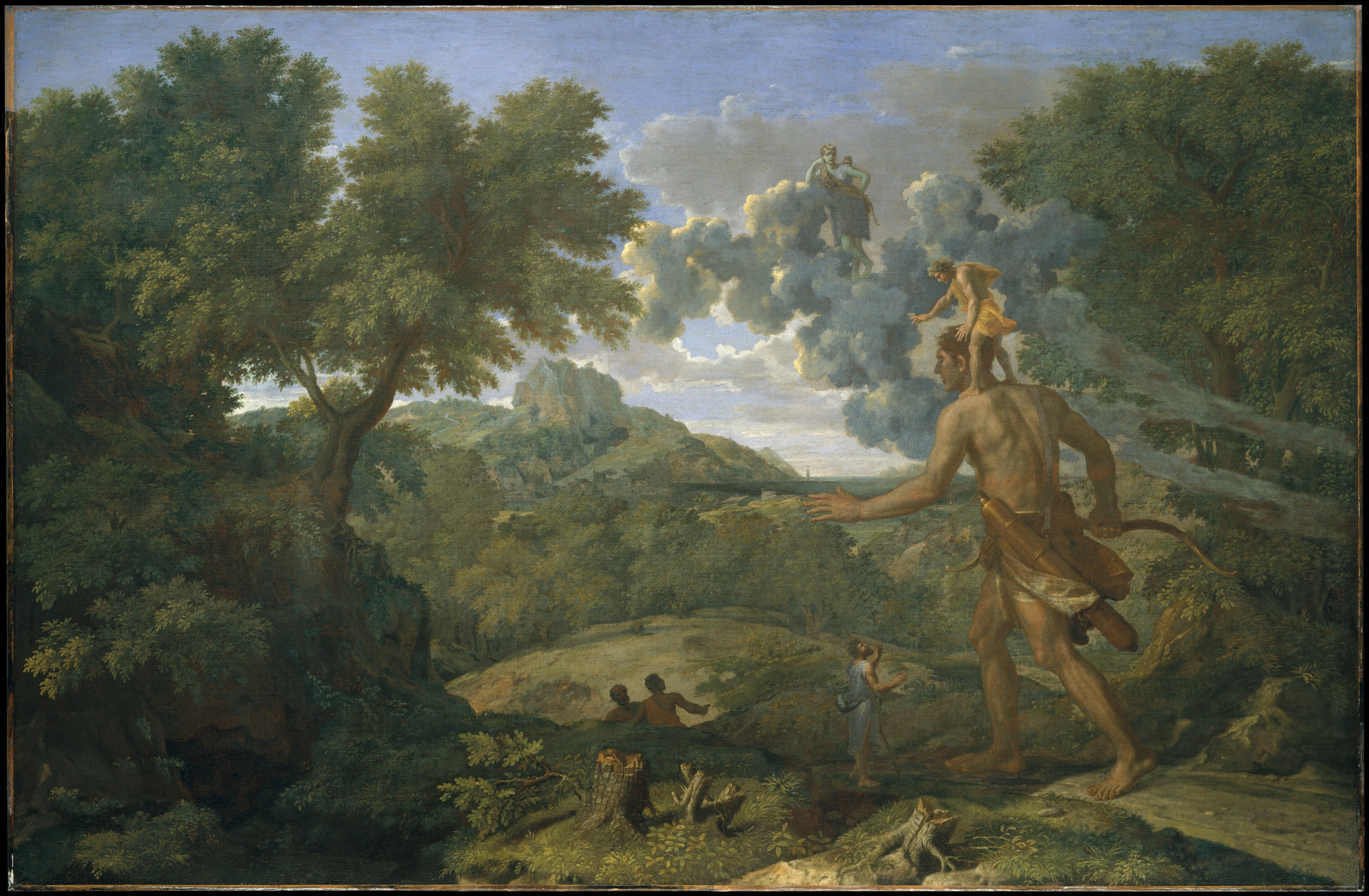
Nicolas Poussin (1658) "Landscape with blind Orion seeking the sun"

Once Orion arrived in Chios, he got drunk and raped Merope, daughter of King Oenopion. In retaliation, Oenopion blinded and exiled the hunter. Orion stumbled to Hephaestus' forge in Lemnos, who ordered his servant, Cedalion, to guide Orion. On the giant's shoulders, Cedalion guided him eastmost, where he was healed by Helios or Asclepius. Orion returned to Chios to punish Oenopion, but the king hid away underground to escape Orion's wrath.

Merope's identity varies in other stories. One source refers to her as Oenopion's wife, another as the daughter of Minos, not Oenopion. Parthenius adds more to the marriage of Orion, with him slaying the wild beasts of Chios and looting the other inhabitants to make a bride-price for Oenopion's daughter, who is called Aëro or Leiro. The king remains reluctant to marry his daughter to the likes of Orion, and, eventually, the frustrated hunter breaks into the princess' bedchamber to rape her. The text implies that Oenopion blinds Orion on the spot afterward.

Lucian includes a picture with Orion in a rhetorical description of an ideal building, in which Orion is walking into the rising sun with Lemnos nearby, Cedalion on his shoulder. He recovers his sight there with Hephaestus still watching in the background.

The next picture deals with the ancient story of Orion. He is blind, and on his shoulder carries Cedalion, who directs the sightless eyes towards the East. The rising Sun heals his infirmity; and there stands Hephaestus on Lemnos, watching the cure.

Latin sources add that Oenopion was the son of Dionysus, who sent satyrs to put Orion into a deep sleep so he could be blinded. One source tells the same story but converts Oenopion into Minos of Crete. It adds that an oracle told Orion that his sight could be restored by walking eastward and that he found his way by hearing the Cyclops' hammer, placing a Cyclops as a guide on his shoulder. One scholion, on a Latin poem, explains that Hephaestus gave Orion a horse.

=== Death ===
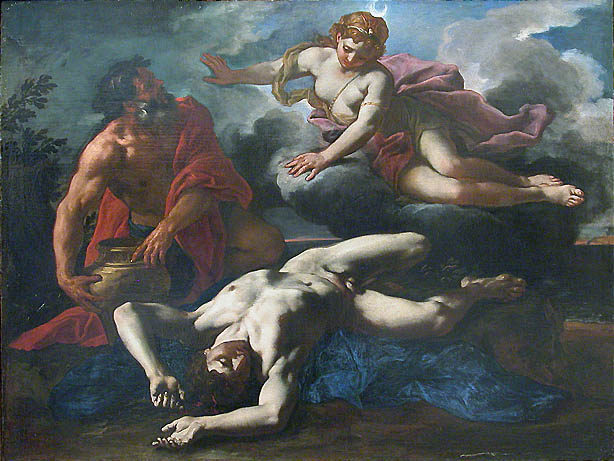
Daniel Seiter's 1685 painting of Diana over Orion's dead body, before he is placed in the heavens

Orion's next journey took him to Crete where he hunted with Artemis and her mother Leto, and in the course of the hunt, threatened to kill every beast on Earth. Gaia objected and sent a giant scorpion named Scorpio(in some tellings of he story) to fight and kill Orion. Although Orion does not defeat the scorpion in any version, several variants have it die from its wounds. Nicander, in his Theriaca, has the scorpion of ordinary size and hiding under a small stone.

Artemis is credited as Orion's killer in several variations. A common version, in Hyginus' De astronomia, has it done accidentally. Apollo, jealous of Orion's relationship with Artemis, sees Orion swimming in the ocean, a long way off. He remarks that Artemis could not possibly hit that thing floating in the water. Accepting the challenge, she unknowingly shot Orion; when his body washed up on shore, she wept copiously.

Other versions credit Artemis as a direct killer. Homer's Iliad states Eos fell in love with Orion and took him to Delos where Artemis killed him. Another has Orion challenge Artemis to a contest with the discus, and attempts to rape her or one of her attendants, Upis. Aratus' Phaenomena conflates the elements of the myth: Orion attacks Artemis while hunting on Chios, and the scorpion kills him there.

Telesarchus is quoted as saying in a scholion that Asclepius resurrected Orion, resulting in the healer's death.

=== Ascension ===
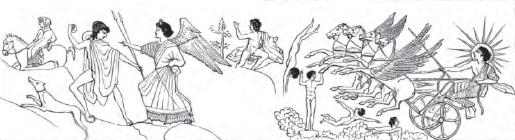
This illustration of the late-5th century BC Greek vase artwork Blacas krater shows a mythological interpretation of the rising Sun and other astronomical figures—the large pair on the left are Cephalus and Eos; Cephalus appears to be in the form of Orion's constellation, and the dog at his foot may represent Sirius.

Hyginus gives three versions of Orion's ascension to the stars. In the version where Orion is killed by a scorpion, Artemis and Leto asked Zeus to place him in the sky as a constellation. Zeus consented and, as a memorial to Orion's death, added the scorpion to the heavens as well. In the variation where Artemis unknowingly kills him, it is she who places him in the stars. The third connects Orion with several constellations, not just Scorpius. Orion chased Pleione, the mother of the Pleiades, for seven years, until Zeus intervened and raised all of them to the stars. Canis Minor and Canis Major are his dogs, the one in front is called Procyon. They chase Lepus, the hare, although Hyginus says some critics thought this too base a prey for the noble Orion and have him pursuing Taurus, the bull, instead. A Renaissance mythographer adds other names for Orion's dogs: Leucomelaena, Maera, Dromis, Cisseta, Lampuris, Lycoctonus, Ptoophagus, Arctophonus.

== Cult and popular appreciation ==
In Ancient Greece, Orion had a hero cult in the region of Boeotia. The number of places associated with his birth suggest that it was widespread. Hyria, the most frequently mentioned, was in the territory of Tanagra. A feast of Orion was held at Tanagra as late as the Roman Empire. They had a tomb of Orion most likely at the foot of Mount Cerycius (now Mount Tanagra). Maurice Bowra argues that Orion was a national hero of the Boeotians, much as Castor and Pollux were for the Dorians. He bases this claim on the Athenian epigram on the Battle of Coronea in which a hero gave the Boeotian army an oracle, then fought on their side and defeated the Athenians.

The Boeotian school of epic poetry was chiefly concerned with the genealogies of the gods and heroes; later writers elaborated this web. Several other myths are attached to Orion in this way: A papyrus fragment of the Boeotian poet Corinna gives Orion fifty sons (a traditional number). This included the oracular hero Acraephen, who, she sings, gave a response to Asopus regarding Asopus' daughters who were abducted by the gods. Corinna sang of Orion conquering and naming all the land of the dawn. Bowra argues that Orion was believed to have delivered oracles as well, probably at a different shrine. Hyginus says that Hylas's mother was Menodice, daughter of Orion. Another mythographer, Liberalis, tells of Menippe and Metioche, daughters of Orion, who sacrificed themselves for their country's good and were transformed into comets. Lastly, Mecionice, the mother of Euphemus by Poseidon, was also recounted as Orion's daughter.

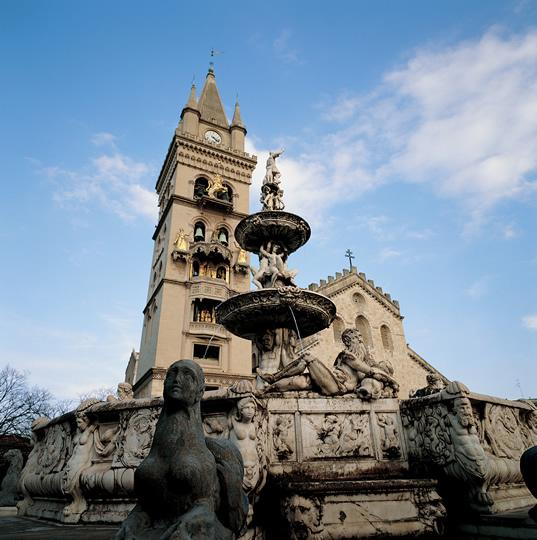
The Fountain of Orion, in Messina, Italy

Orion also has etiological connection to the city of Messina in Sicily. Diodorus of Sicily wrote a history of the world up to his own time (the beginning of the reign of Augustus). He starts with the gods and the heroes. At the end of this part of the work, he tells the story of Orion and two wonder-stories of his mighty earth-works in Sicily. One tells how he aided Zanclus, the founder of Zancle (the former name for Messina), by building the promontory which forms the harbor. The other, which Diodorus ascribes to Hesiod, relates that there was once a broad sea between Sicily and the mainland. Orion built the whole Peloris, the Punta del Faro, and the temple to Poseidon at the tip, after which he settled in Euboea. He was then "numbered among the stars of heaven and thus won for himself immortal remembrance". The Renaissance historian and mathematician Francesco Maurolico, who came from Messina, identified the remains of a temple of Orion near the present Messina Cathedral. Maurolico also designed an ornate fountain, built by the sculptor Giovanni Angelo Montorsoli in 1547, in which Orion is a central figure, symbolizing the Emperor Charles V, also a master of the sea and restorer of Messina;

Images of Orion in classical art are difficult to recognize, and clear examples are rare. There are several ancient Greek images of club-carrying hunters that could represent Orion, but such generic examples could equally represent an archetypal "hunter", or indeed Heracles. Some claims have been made that other Greek art represents specific aspects of the Orion myth. A tradition of this type has been discerned in 5th century BC Greek pottery—John Beazley identified a scene of Apollo, Delian palm in hand, revenging Orion for the attempted rape of Artemis, while another scholar has identified a scene of Orion attacking Artemis as she is revenged by a snake (a counterpart to the scorpion) in a funerary group—supposedly symbolizing the hope that even the criminal Orion could be made immortal, as well as an astronomical scene in which Cephalus is thought to stand in for Orion and his constellation, also reflecting this system of iconography. Also, a tomb frieze in Taranto (c. 300 BC) may show Orion attacking Opis. But the earliest surviving clear depiction of Orion in classical art is Roman, from the depictions of the Underworld scenes of the Odyssey discovered at the Esquiline Hill (50–40 BC). Orion is also seen on a 4th-century bas-relief, currently affixed to a wall in the Porto neighborhood of Naples. The constellation Orion rises in November, the end of the sailing season, and was associated with stormy weather, and this characterization extended to the mythical Orion—the bas-relief may be associated with the sailors of the city.

== Interpretations ==
=== Renaissance ===
Mythographers have discussed Orion at least since the Renaissance of classical learning; the Renaissance interpretations were allegorical. In the 14th century, Boccaccio interpreted the oxhide story as representing human conception; the hide is the womb, Neptune the moisture of semen, Jupiter its heat, and Mercury the female coldness; he also explained Orion's death at the hands of the moon-goddess as the Moon producing winter storms. The 16th-century Italian mythographer Natalis Comes interpreted the whole story of Orion as an allegory of the evolution of a storm cloud: Begotten by air (Zeus), water (Poseidon), and the sun (Apollo), a storm cloud is diffused (Chios, which Comes derives from χέω, "pour out"), rises though the upper air (Aërope, as Comes spells Merope), chills (is blinded), and is turned into rain by the moon (Artemis). He also explains how Orion walked on the sea: "Since the subtler part of the water which is rarefied rests on the surface, it is said that Orion learned from his father how to walk on water." Similarly, Orion's conception made him a symbol of the philosophical child, an allegory of philosophy springing from multiple sources, in the Renaissance as in alchemical works, with some variations. The 16th-century German alchemist Michael Maier lists the fathers as Apollo, Vulcan and Mercury, and the 18th-century French alchemist Antoine-Joseph Pernety gave them as Jupiter, Neptune and Mercury.

=== Modern ===
Modern mythographers have seen the story of Orion as a way to access local folk tales and cultic practices directly without the interference of ancient high culture; several of them have explained Orion, each through his own interpretation of Greek prehistory and of how Greek mythology represents it. There are some points of general agreement between them: for example, that the attack on Opis is an attack on Artemis, for Opis is one of the names of Artemis.

There was a movement in the late nineteenth century to interpret all the Boeotian heroes as merely personifications of the constellations; there has since come to be wide agreement that the myth of Orion existed before there was a constellation named for him. Homer, for example, mentions Orion, the Hunter, and Orion, the constellation, but never confuses the two. Once Orion was recognized as a constellation, astronomy in turn affected the myth. The story of Side may well be a piece of astronomical mythology. The Greek word side means pomegranate, which bears fruit while Orion, the constellation, can be seen in the night sky. Rose suggests she is connected with Sidae in Boeotia, and that the pomegranate, as a sign of the Underworld, is connected with her descent there.

The 19th-century German classical scholar Erwin Rohde viewed Orion as an example of the Greeks erasing the line between the gods and mankind. That is, if Orion was in the heavens, other mortals could hope to be also.

The Hungarian mythographer Karl Kerényi, one of the founders of the modern study of Greek mythology, wrote about Orion in Gods of the Greeks (1951). Kerényi portrays Orion as a giant of Titanic vigor and criminality, born outside his mother as were Tityos or Dionysus. Kerényi places great stress on the variant in which Merope is the wife of Oenopion. He sees this as the remnant of a lost form of the myth in which Merope was Orion's mother (converted by later generations to his stepmother and then to the present forms). Orion's blinding is therefore parallel to that of Aegypius and Oedipus.

In Dionysus (1976), Kerényi portrays Orion as a shamanic hunting hero, surviving from Minoan times (hence his association with Crete). Kerényi derives Hyrieus (and Hyria) from the Cretan dialect word ὕρον hyron, meaning "beehive", which survives only in ancient dictionaries. From this association he turns Orion into a representative of the old mead-drinking cultures, overcome by the wine masters Oenopion and Oeneus. (The Greek for "wine" is oinos.) Fontenrose cites a source stating that Oenopion taught the Chians how to make wine before anybody else knew how.

Joseph Fontenrose wrote Orion: the Myth of the Hunter and the Huntress (1981) to show Orion as the type specimen of a variety of grotesque hero. Fontenrose views him as similar to Cúchulainn, that is, stronger, larger, and more potent than ordinary men and the violent lover of the Divine Huntress; other heroes of the same type are Actaeon, Leucippus (son of Oenomaus), Cephalus, Teiresias, and Zeus as the lover of Callisto. Fontenrose also sees Eastern parallels in the figures of Aqhat, Attis, Dumuzi, Gilgamesh, Dushyanta, and Prajapati (as pursuer of Ushas).

In The Greek Myths (1955), Robert Graves views Oenopion as his perennial Year-King, at the stage where the king pretends to die at the end of his term and appoints a substitute, in this case Orion, who actually dies in his place. His blindness is iconotropy from a picture of Odysseus blinding the Cyclops, mixed with a purely Hellenic solar legend: the Sun-hero is captured and blinded by his enemies at dusk, but escapes and regains his sight at dawn, when all beasts flee him. Graves sees the rest of the myth as a syncretism of diverse stories. These include Gilgamesh and the Scorpion-Men, Set becoming a scorpion to kill Horus and the story of Aqhat and Yatpan from Ras Shamra, as well as a conjectural story of how the priestesses of Artemis Opis killed a visitor to their island of Ortygia. He compares Orion's birth from the bull's hide to a West African rainmaking charm and claims that the son of Poseidon should be a rainmaker.

== Cultural references ==
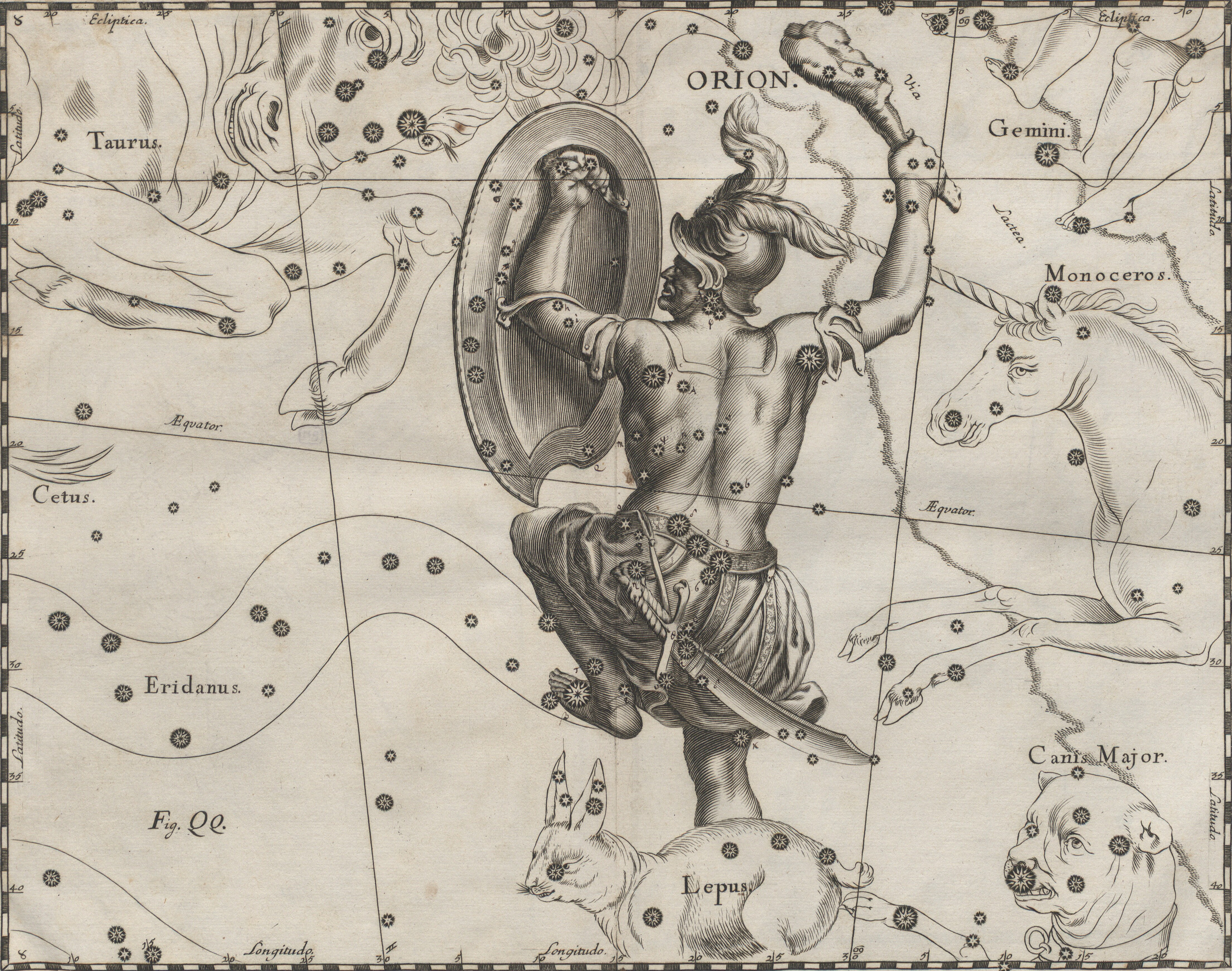
Johannes Hevelius drew the Orion constellation in Uranographia, his celestial catalogue in 1690

The ancient Greek and Roman sources which tell more about Orion than his being a gigantic huntsman are mostly both dry and obscure, but poets do write of him: The brief passages in Aratus and Virgil are mentioned above. Pindar celebrates the pancratist Melissus of Thebes "who was not granted the build of an Orion", but whose strength was still great.

Cicero translated Aratus in his youth; he made the Orion episode half again longer than it was in the Greek, adding the traditional Latin topos of madness to Aratus's text. Cicero's Aratea is one of the oldest Latin poems to come down to us as more than isolated lines; this episode may have established the technique of including epyllia in non-epic poems.

Orion is used by Horace, who tells of his death at the hands of Diana/Artemis, and by Ovid, in his Fasti for May 11, the middle day of the Lemuria, when (in Ovid's time) the constellation Orion set with the sun. Ovid's episode tells the story of Hyrieus and two gods, Jupiter and Neptune, although Ovid is bashful about the climax; Ovid makes Hyrieus a poor man, which means the sacrifice of an entire ox is more generous. There is also a single mention of Orion in his Art of Love, as a sufferer from unrequited love: "Pale Orion wandered in the forest for Side."

Statius mentions Orion four times in his Thebaïd; twice as the constellation, a personification of storm, but twice as the ancestor of Dryas of Tanagra, one of the defenders of Thebes. The very late Greek epic poet Nonnus mentions the oxhide story in brief, while listing the Hyrians in his Catalogue of the Boeotian army of Dionysius.

References since antiquity are fairly rare. At the beginning of the 17th century, French sculptor Barthélemy Prieur cast a bronze statue Orion et Cédalion, some time between 1600 and 1611. This featured Orion with Cedalion on his shoulder, in a depiction of the ancient legend of Orion recovering his sight; the sculpture is now displayed at the Louvre.

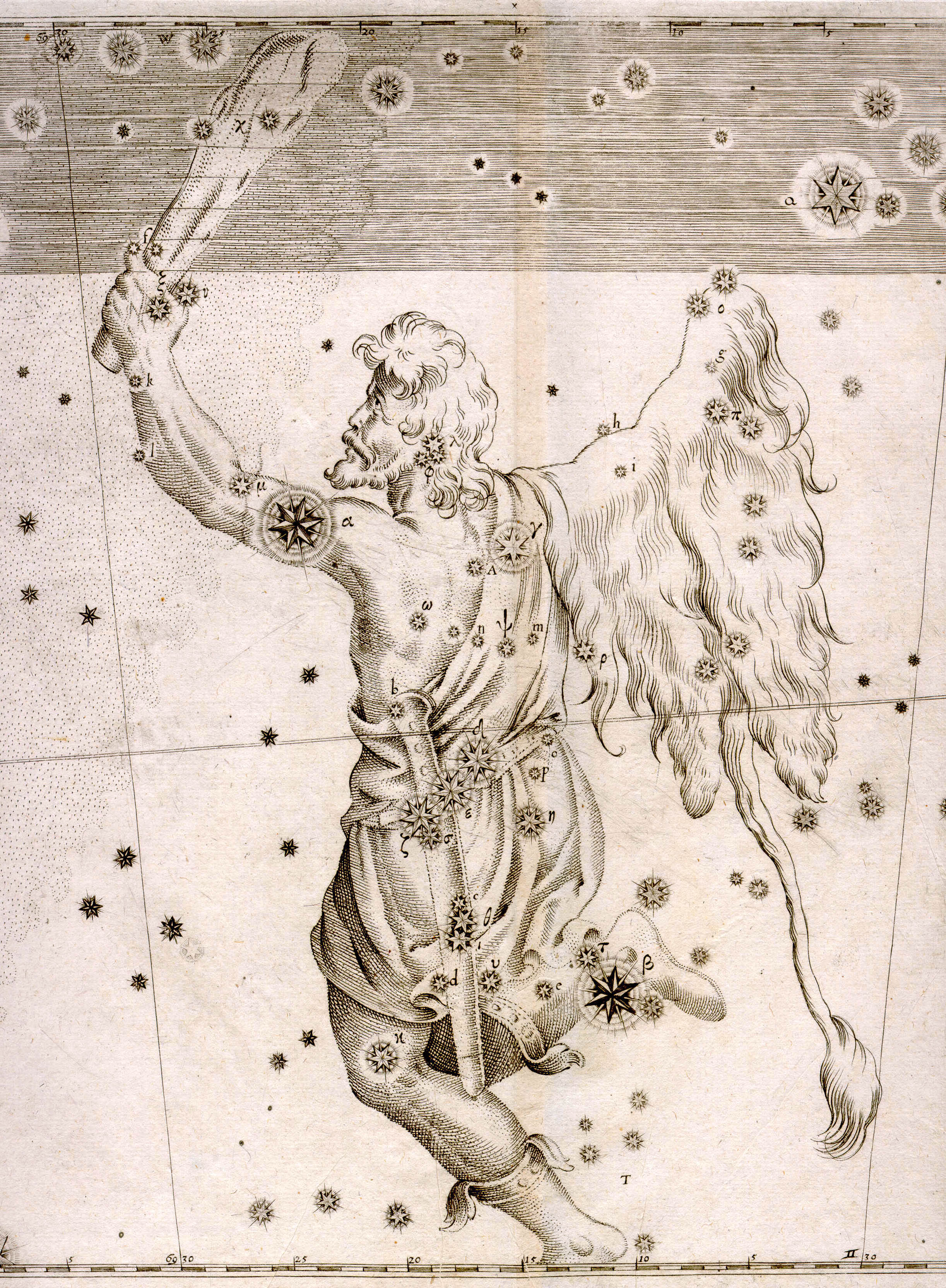
An engraving of Orion from Johann Bayer's Uranometria, 1603 (US Naval Observatory Library)

Nicolas Poussin painted Paysage avec Orion aveugle cherchant le soleil (1658) ("Landscape with blind Orion seeking the sun"), after learning of the description by the 2nd-century Greek author Lucian, of a picture of Orion recovering his sight; Poussin included a storm-cloud, which both suggests the transient nature of Orion's blindness, soon to be removed like a cloud exposing the sun, and includes Natalis Comes' esoteric interpretation of Orion as a storm-cloud. Poussin need not have consulted Lucian directly; the passage is in the notes of the illustrated French translation of Philostratus' Imagines which Poussin is known to have consulted. The Austrian Daniel Seiter (active in Turin, Italy), painted Diane auprès du cadavre d'Orion (c. 1685) ("Diana next to Orion's corpse"), pictured above.

In Endymion (1818), John Keats includes the line "Or blind Orion hungry for the morn", thought to be inspired by Poussin. William Hazlitt may have introduced Keats to the painting—he later wrote the essay "On Landscape of Nicholas Poussin", published in Table Talk, Essays on Men and Manners (1821–2). Richard Henry Horne, writing in the generation after Keats and Hazlitt, penned the three-volume epic poem Orion in 1843. It went into at least ten editions and was reprinted by the Scholartis Press in 1928.

Science fiction author Ben Bova re-invented Orion as a time-traveling servant of various gods in a series of five novels. In The Blood of Olympus, the final volume of a series, Rick Riordan depicts Orion as one of the giant sons of the earth goddess Gaea.

Italian composer Francesco Cavalli wrote the opera, L'Orione in 1653. The story is set on the Greek island of Delos and focuses on Diana's love for Orion as well as on her rival, Aurora. Diana shoots Orion only after being tricked by Apollo into thinking him a sea monster—she then laments his death and searches for Orion in the underworld until he is elevated to the heavens. French composer Louis de La Coste composed in 1728 the tragédie lyrique Orion. This time, it is Diana who is in love with Orion and is rejected by him. Johann Christian Bach ('the English Bach') wrote an opera, Orion, or Diana Reveng'd, first presented at London's Haymarket Theatre in 1763. Orion, sung by a castrato, is in love with Candiope, the daughter of Oenopion, King of Arcadia, but his arrogance has offended Diana. Diana's oracle forbids him to marry Candiope and foretells his glory and death. He bids a touching farewell to Candiope and marches off to his destiny. Diana allows him his victory and then kills him, offstage, with her arrow. In another aria, his mother Retrea (Queen of Thebes), laments his death but ultimately sees his elevation to the heavens. The 2002 opera Galileo Galilei by American composer Philip Glass includes an opera within an opera piece between Orion and Merope. The sunlight, which heals Orion's blindness, is an allegory of modern science. Philip Glass has also written a shorter work on Orion, as have Tōru Takemitsu, Kaija Saariaho, and John Casken. David Bedford's late-twentieth-century works are about the constellation rather than the mythical figure; he was an amateur astronomer.

The twentieth-century French poet René Char found the blind, lustful huntsman, both pursuer and pursued, a central symbol, as James Lawler has explained at some length in his 1978 work René Char: the Myth and the Poem. French novelist Claude Simon likewise found Orion an apt symbol, in this case of the writer, as he explained in his Orion aveugle of 1970. Marion Perret argues that Orion is a silent link in T. S. Eliot's The Waste Land (1922), connecting the lustful Actaeon/Sweeney to the blind Teiresias and, through Sirius, to the Dog "that's friend to men".

== See also ==
- Orion (sculpture)
- Rudra
- Standing on the shoulders of giants
