= Talos (inventor) =

Greek mythological inventor

In Greek mythology, Talos (/ˈteɪlɒs/; Ancient Greek: Τάλως Talōs) was an Athenian inventor. On some accounts, Talos was also called Attalus (Ἄτταλος) or Calus/Calos (Κάλως).

== Mythology ==
While he was still a lad in years, Talos/Perdix was receiving his education in the home of Daedalus. Being more gifted than his teacher he invented the potter's wheel and according to Ovid, he used a fish spine as the prototype of the saw. When Talos had come by chance upon a jawbone of a snake and with it had sawn through a small piece of wood, he tried to imitate the jaggedness of the serpent's teeth. Consequently, he fashioned a saw out of iron, by means of which he would saw the lumber which he used in his work, and for this accomplishment he gained the reputation of having discovered a device which would be of great service to the art of building. He likewise discovered also the tool for describing a circle and certain other cunningly contrived devices whereby he gained for himself great fame.

But Daedalus, becoming jealous of the youth and feeling that his fame was going to rise far above that of his teacher, treacherously slew the youth. And being detected in the act of burying him, he was asked what he was burying, whereupon he replied, I am inhuming a snake. Here a man may well wonder at the strange happening, that the same animal that led to the thought of devising the saw should also have been the means through which the murder came to be discovered. And Daedalus, having been accused and adjudged guilty of murder by the court of the Areopagites, at first fled to one of the demes of Attica, the inhabitants of which, we are told, were named after him Daedalidae. After that, he was exiled to the court of Minos: "After the corpse was discovered, Daedalus was tried...and went into exile at the court of Minos."

In some accounts, Athena intervened of murder and turned Talos/Perdix into a partridge to save his life. According to Ovid, that partridge later watched the death and burial of Icarus with glee.

== In arts ==
Bruegel's Landscape with the Fall of Icarus includes a partridge on a tree, presumably representing the transformed Talos. However, like the rest of the characters, it is yet to react to the fall.
