= Eurycleia (nurse of Odysseus) =

Greek mythological figure

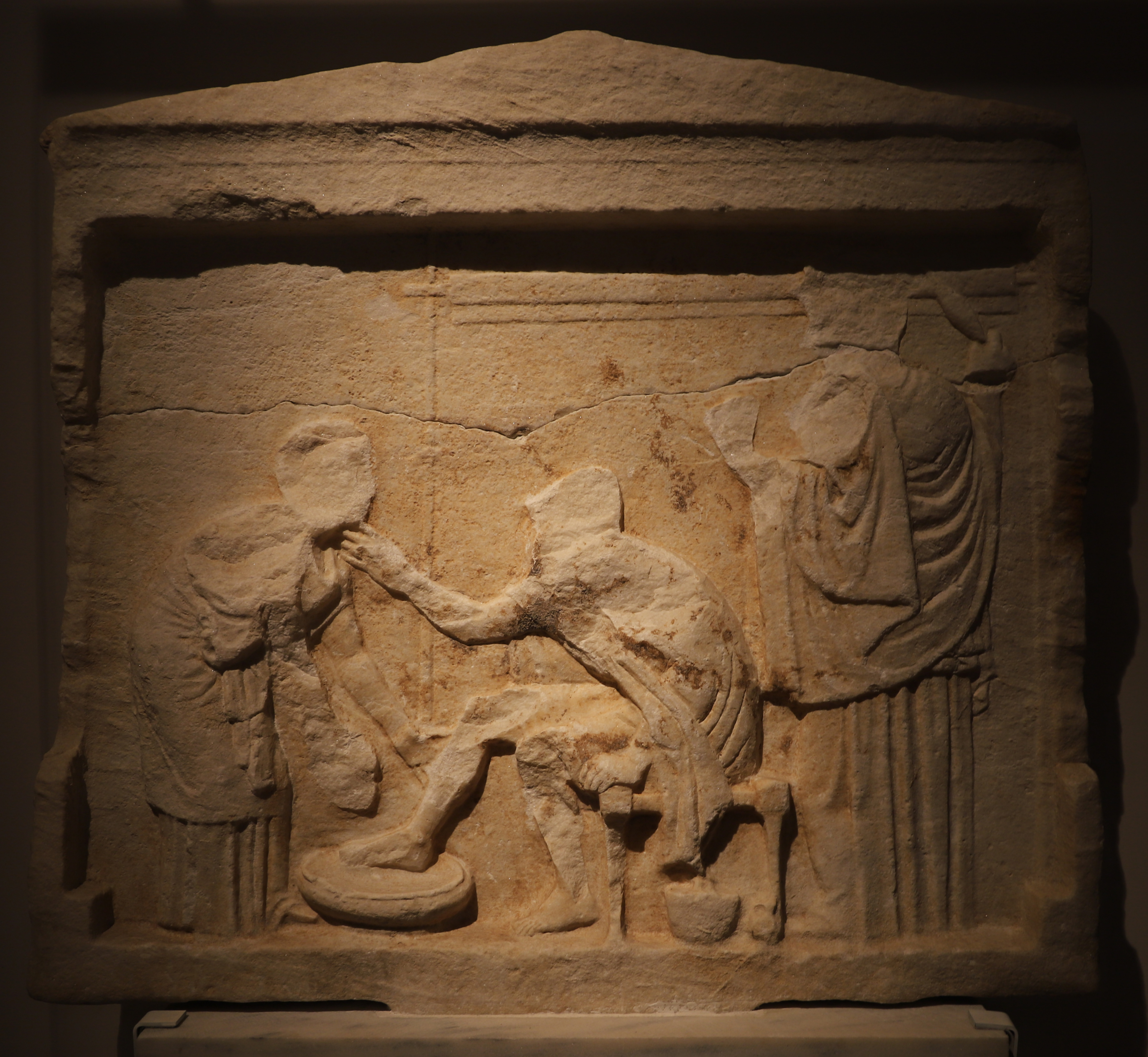
Euryclea recognises Odysseus, 4th-century BC votive relief from Thessaly, Greece.

In Greek mythology, Eurycleia (Ancient Greek: Εὐρύκλεια Eurýkleia), or Euryclea (/ˌjʊərɪˈkliːə/; also known as Antiphata (Ἀντιφάτη Antipháte) in other traditions), is the daughter of Ops and granddaughter of Peisenor, as well as the wet-nurse of Odysseus.

== Mythology ==
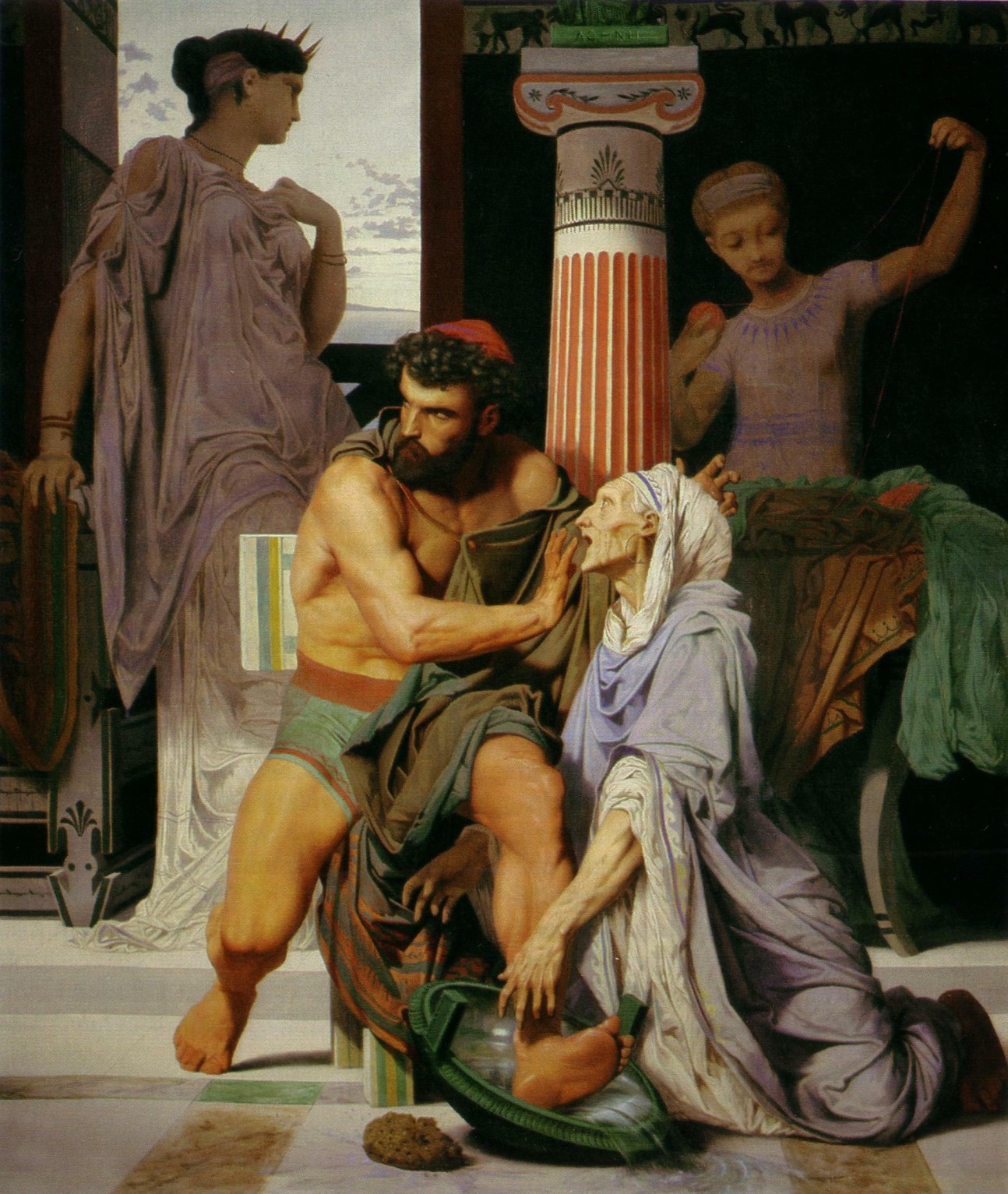
Gustave Boulanger, Ulysse et Euryclée (1849)

As a girl, Eurycleia was bought by Laertes, Odysseus' father. He treated her as his wife, but she was never his consummated lover so as not to dishonor his real wife, Anticleia. She later nursed Telemachus, Odysseus' son.

Eurycleia was the only person to recognize Odysseus without him first revealing himself (as he did to Telemachus) after he returned home from the Trojan War. After he entered his own house as a guest of Penelope disguised as a beggar, Eurycleia bathed him and recognized him by a scar just above his knee, which he got from a boar while boar hunting with his grandfather Autolycus. Odysseus brutally warned her not to tell Penelope or anyone else (except Telemachus, who already knew) in the house of his true identity.

Eurycleia also informed Odysseus which of his servant girls had been unfaithful to Penelope during his absence, conspiring with Penelope's suitors and becoming their lovers. Among them was Melantho. His son Telemachus hanged the twelve that Eurycleia identified.

Later, Eurycleia informed Penelope that Odysseus has returned, but Penelope did not believe the maid. The queen then tested Odysseus to prove that he was indeed her husband and asked him to move the bed Odysseus built in their marriage-chamber; Odysseus told Penelope that it was not possible, as one of the legs of the bed was built into a live olive tree, a secret that only Penelope and Odysseus would know. She finally accepted that her husband had returned.

In addition, it was Eurycleia who gave provisions and supplies to Telemachus from the storehouse before he left for Pylos to seek news about Odysseus. She took an oath not to tell Penelope he had left until twelve days had passed; Telemachus not wanting his mother to be any more worried than she already was.

== Derivative works ==
Dennis MacDonald argues in several of his books that the woman who anoints Jesus in chapter 14 of the Gospel of Mark is a reference to Eurycleia. She is the only one to recognize Jesus, and what she has done will be widely known, in the same way that Eurycleia is the only one to recognize Odysseus and whose name means "widely known".

== See also ==
- The Odyssey

== Sources ==
- Homer. The Odyssey. Trans. Stanley Lombardo. Canada: Hackett Publishing Company, Inc., 2000. Print.
