= Phrixus =

Ancient Greek mythological figure

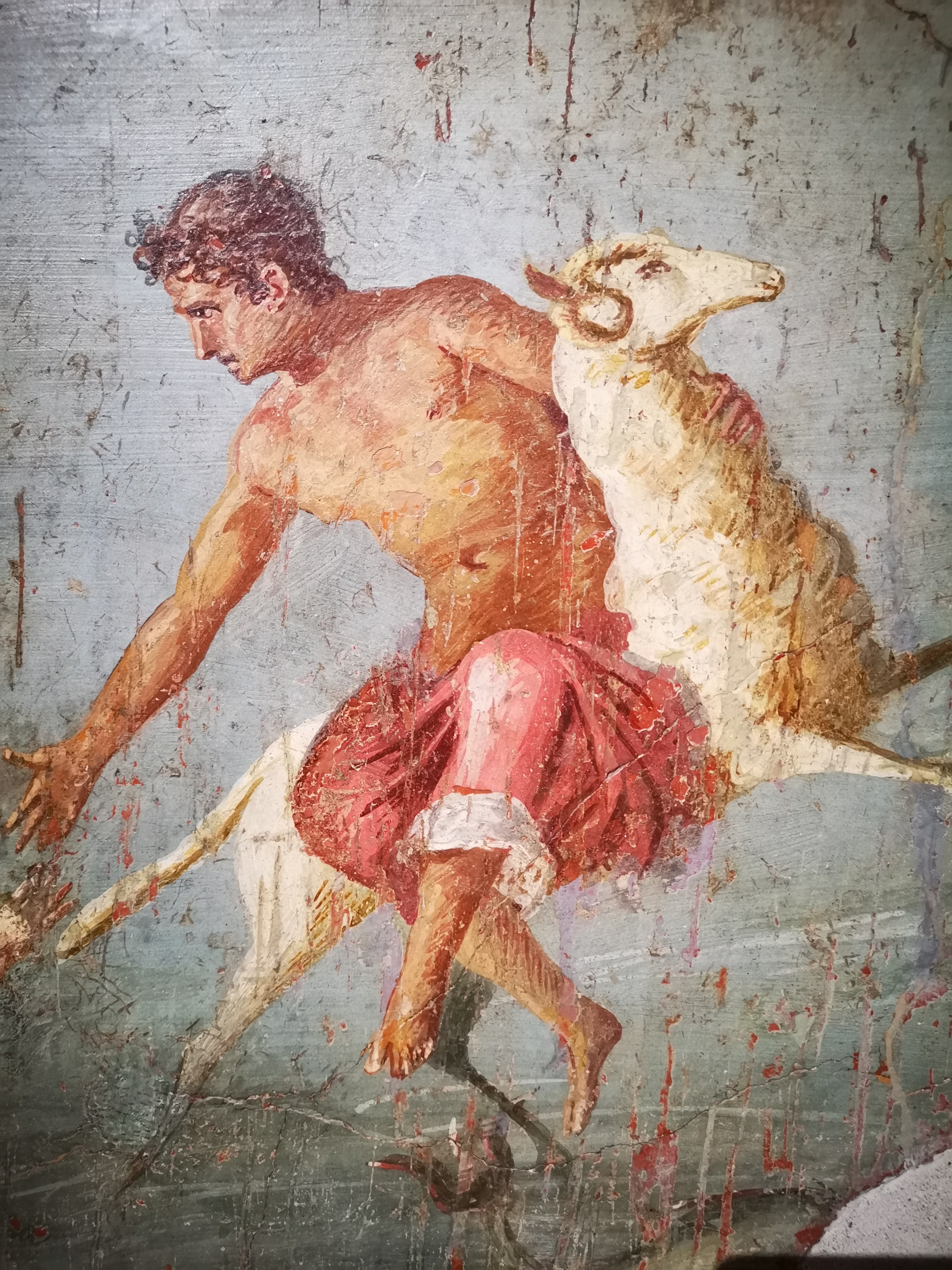
Phrixus on a first-century Roman fresco from Pompeii, now in the National Archaeological Museum of Naples.

In Greek mythology Phrixus (/ˈfrɪksəs/; also spelt Phryxus; Ancient Greek: Φρίξος, romanized: Phríxos means "standing on end, bristling") was the son of Athamas, king of Boeotia, and Nephele (a goddess of clouds). He was the older brother of Helle and the father of Argus, Phrontis, Melas and Cytisorus by Chalciope (Iophassa), daughter of Aeetes, king of Colchis.

== Mythology ==
Phrixus and Helle were hated by their stepmother, Ino. She hatched a devious plot to get rid of the children, roasting all of Boeotia's crop seeds so they would not grow. The local farmers, frightened of famine, asked a nearby oracle for assistance. Ino bribed the men sent to the oracle to lie and tell the others that the oracle required the sacrifice of Phrixus and Helle. Before they were killed, though, Phrixus and Helle were rescued by a flying, or swimming, ram with golden wool sent by Nephele, their natural mother; their starting point is variously recorded as Halos in Thessaly and Orchomenus in Boeotia. During their flight Helle, for unknown reasons, fell off the ram and drowned in the strait between Europe and Asia, which was named after her the Hellespont, meaning the sea of Helle (now the Dardanelles); Phrixus survived all the way to Colchis, where King Aeëtes, the son of the sun god Helios, took him in and treated him kindly, giving Phrixus his daughter, Chalciope, in marriage. In gratitude, Phrixus sacrificed the ram to Zeus (or in some less-common variations of the telling, Poseidon) and gave the king the Golden Fleece of the ram, which Aeëtes hung in a tree in the holy grove of Ares in his kingdom, guarded by a dragon that never slept. Phrixus and Chalciope had four sons, who later joined forces with the Argonauts. The oldest was Argos/Argus, the others were Phrontis, Melas, and Cytisorus.

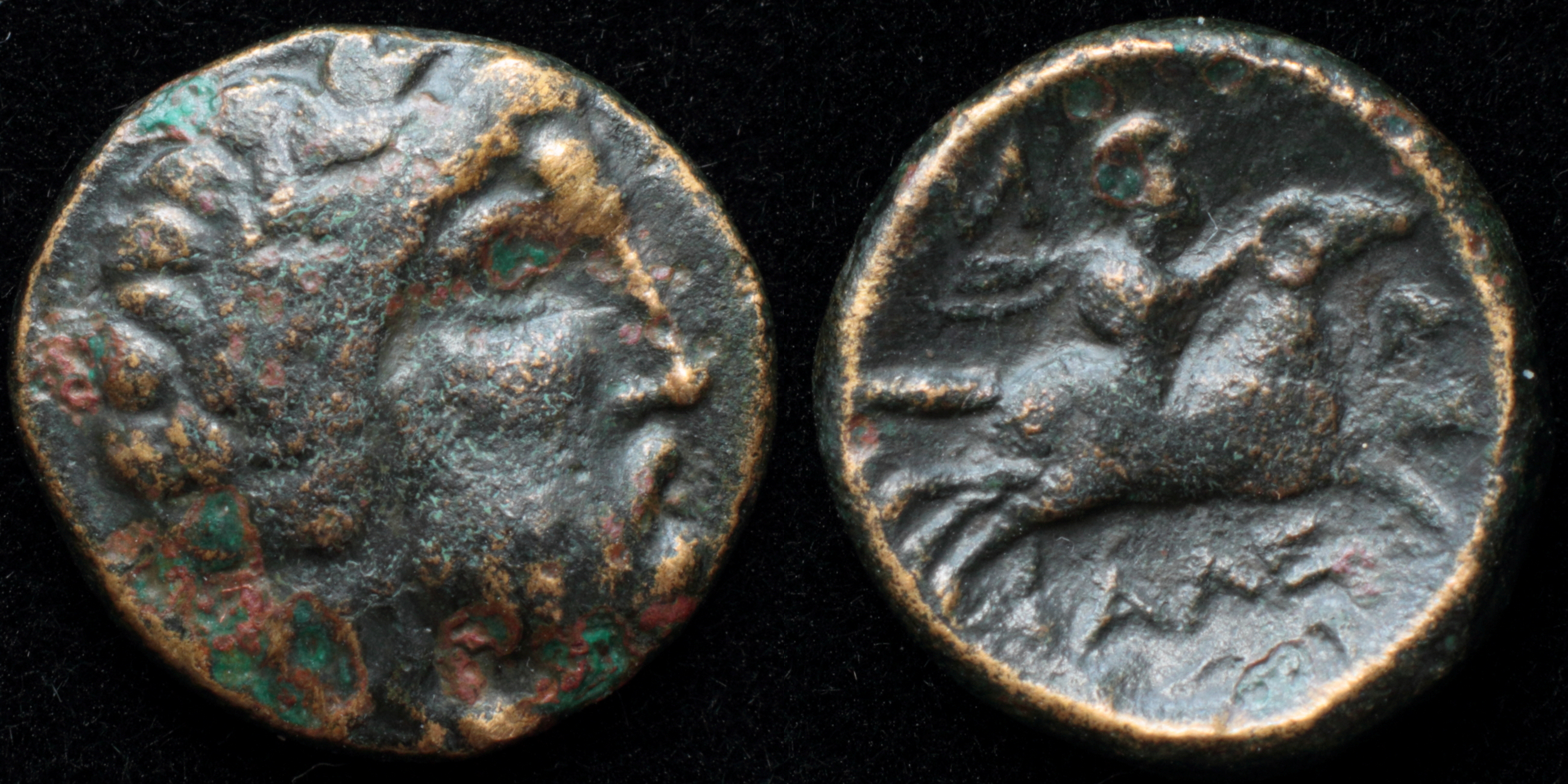
Depiction of Phrixos flying on ram to Colchis on AE dichalkon struck in Halos, Phthiotis in 3rd century BC.

Phrixus thus lived at the court of Aeëtes, but one day Aeëtes learned from an oracle that he would die at the hands of a descendant of Aeolus (the paternal grandfather of Phrixus) and so he killed Phrixus. However, other sources claim that Phrixus lived peacefully at Colchis and died of old age.
