= Aero (mythology) =

In Greek mythology, Haero or Aëro (Ancient Greek: Αἱρὼ, lit. 'to take up', 'raise' or 'lift up') was a Chian princess as the daughter of King Oenopion and the nymph Helice. She was also called Merope and was loved by Orion.

== Mythology ==
Orion, the son of Hyrieus, fell in love with Aero, and asked her father for her hand. For her sake, the giant rendered the island Chios where they lived habitable (it was formerly full of wild beasts), and he also gathered together much booty from the folk who lived there and brought it as a bridal-gift for her. Oenopion however constantly kept putting off the time of the wedding, for he hated the idea of having such a man as his daughter's husband. Then Orion, maddened by strong drink, broke in the doors of the chamber where the girl was lying asleep, and as he was offering violence to her Oenopion attacked him and put out his eyes with a burning brand.
