= Anastasiopolis-Peritheorion =

Archaeological site in Greece

- Αναστασιούπολις - Περιθεώριον (Greek)
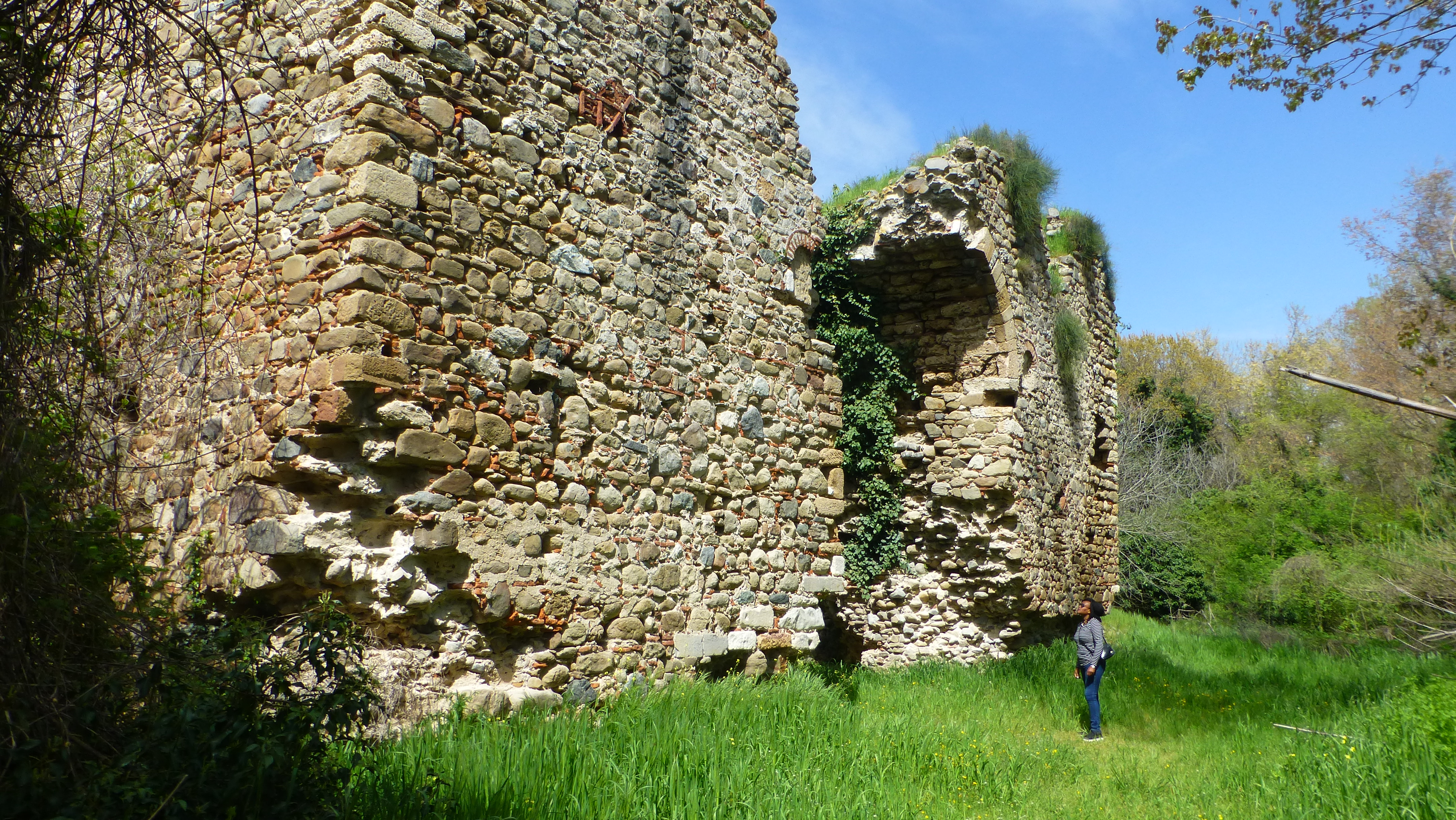

- Location within Greece
- 41°06′09″N 25°05′29″E
- Type: Settlement
- Location: Thrace, Greece

Anastasiopolis-Peritheorion is an archaeological site located in northern Greece, southeast of the village of Amaxades in the Rhodope regional unit in Western Thrace. Parts of the fortification walls of the ancient city of Anastasiopolis (5th – 9th centuries) and Peritheorion (9th century) are still visible. It is unclear whether these are two different cities or a single one that has been renamed in the meantime. The ancient city was an important port on the Aegean Sea and station on the Via Egnatia.

== History ==
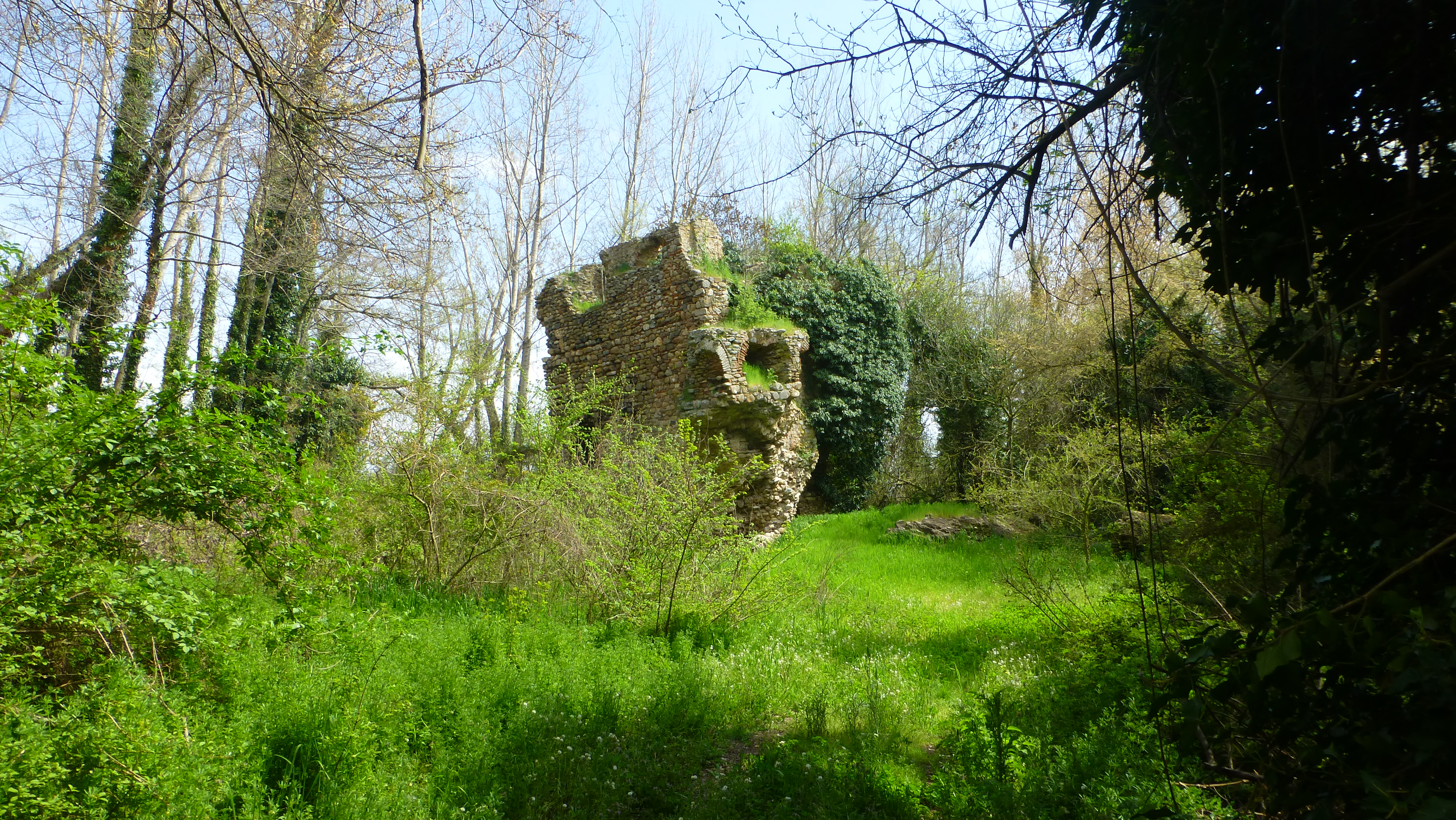
Nature conquers the city

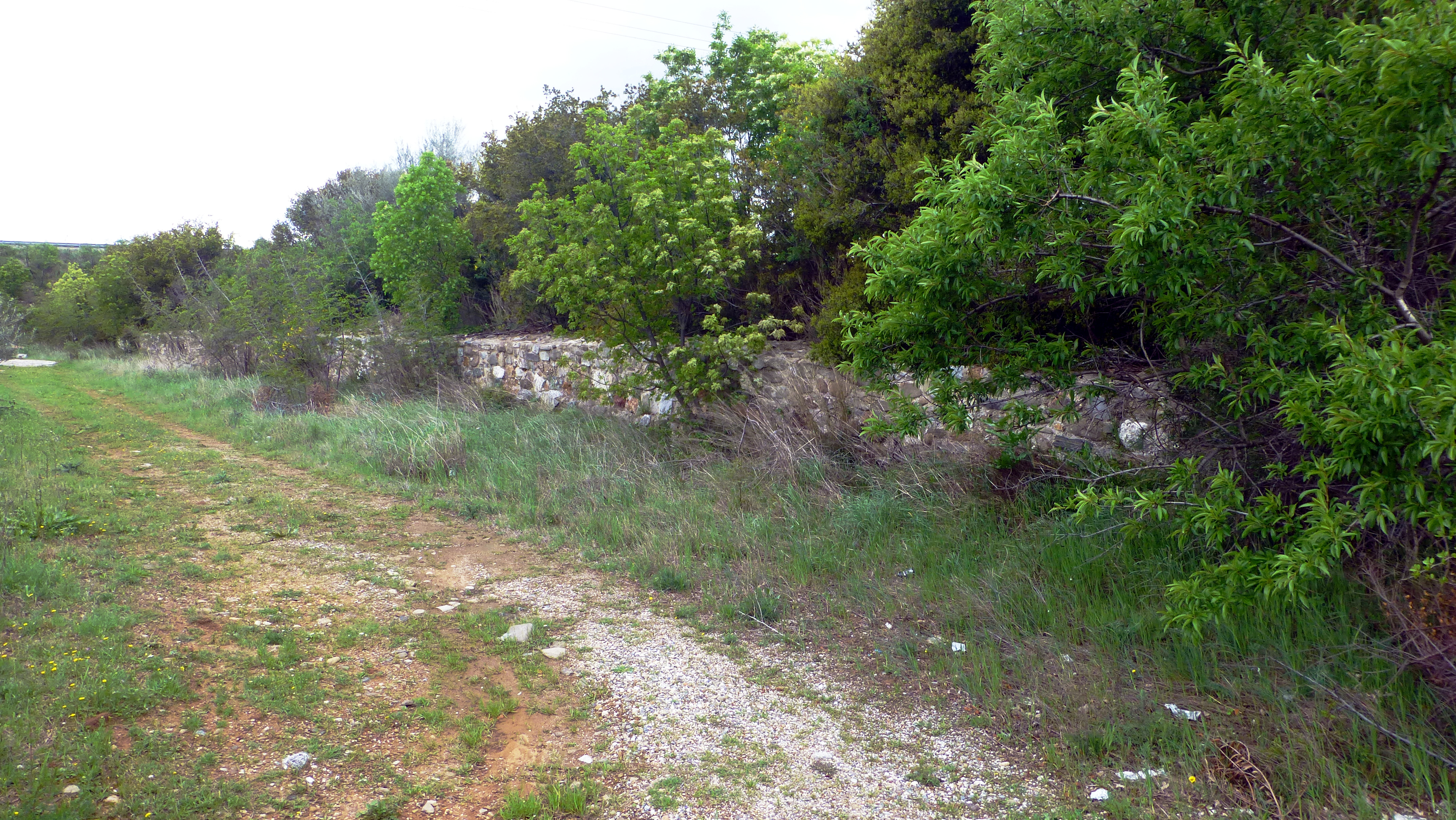
Anastasiopolis - north-south wall

=== Anastasiopolis ===
The city is located in a fertile area north of Lake Vistonida, through which it was originally connected to the Aegean Sea. The ancient city of Tirida was probably located nearby. This in turn is probably identical with Stabulum Diomedis, a road station on the Via Egnatia road, which is attested in late antique itineraries. Its name is derived from the fact that in this region the horses of Diomedes are said to have grazed there, which, according to Greek myth, were tamed by Heracles.

The city of Anastasiopolis itself is first mentioned in the 6th century by the historian Procopius of Caesarea. The name is traced back to the emperor Anastasius I Dicorus (r. 491–518), who apparently founded it, or at least ordered extensive construction there. The city may have been created when Anastasios settled 498 members of this tribe in Thrace after his victory over the Isaurians. After him, according to Prokopios, under Justinian I (r. 527–565), a coastal wall facing the sea and an aqueduct that transported water from the Rhodope Mountains to the city was built. In research it is unclear which of the verifiable early Byzantine building measures on the city go back to Justinian I and which were already initiated by his predecessor Anastasios I, after whom the city was named. Prokopios tends to attribute infrastructure work to Justinian, which in reality can be traced back to his predecessor. In this regard, it is also significant that he mentions Justinian's aqueduct, but not the barrier wall between the city and the Rhodope Mountains (see below under ruins), which could therefore have existed before.

Despite these fortifications, the city was captured by barbarians who invaded the Byzantine Empire in 562. The diocese of Anastasiopolis was part of the archbishopric of Trajanopolis from its foundation in the 7th century until the 12th century.

=== Peritheorion ===
The name Peritheorion is first attested from the 9th century. It is often assumed that the city was originally called Anastasiopolis and was later renamed Peritheorion. However, modern research also supports the theory that two different cities were involved. Their erroneous equation goes back to the emperor and historian John VI Kantakouzenos, who wrote in the 14th century that Anastasiopolis had recently been renamed Peritheorion by Emperor Andronikos III Palaiologos (r. 1328–1341). According to the records of the Patriarch Nicholas Mystikos, however, the city of Peritheorion was previously known as a city with its own diocese, separate from Anastasiopolis.

In the 11th century, Peritheorion was a rural town where Gregory Pakourianos's brother owned a house and the Vatopedi Monastery owned a courtyard. At the same time, the place seems to have had a certain economic importance in the 11th and 12th centuries, as it is mentioned in several treaties between the Republic of Venice and the Byzantine Empire. In 1203 Tsar Kaloyan of Bulgaria invaded Thrace, destroyed Peritheorion and various other cities in the region, and dragged their inhabitants to the banks of the Danube.

In the 14th century, however, the city is again documented in the sources. During this time it was re-fortified by Andronikos III and the bishopric of the city was elevated to a metropolitan area. Most of the surviving remains seen today date from this phase, although earlier phases are also relatively easy to spot. At this time, the Via Egnatia had clearly lost its importance as a trade route in favor of maritime trade (especially through the northern Italian cities such as Venice). Many places along the Via Egnatia were thus deprived of their economic basis and the decline was unstoppable.

The city was also involved in the Byzantine civil war of 1341–1347: in 1342 John VI Kantakouzenos besieged Peritheorion in vain, where his domestic opponents were staying. Also in the following year he failed to capture, now supported by the allied Emir Umur of Aydın. On July 7, 1345, John V and Umur won a decisive victory over the robber baron Momchil, who had established a quasi-independent rule in the Rhodope Mountains in the battle of Peritheorion in front of the city walls. However, the townspeople did not take part in the clashes and waited for the outcome. In 1355 John Asanes, governor of Peritheorion, handed the city over to Emperor John V Palaiologos, the opponent of John VI. It wasn't until 1357 that John V actually got control of the place.

Shortly after the rise of the Ottoman Sultan Murad II, in 1421 at the latest, Peritheorion was under his control and was given away by the ruler to his Genoese ally, Giovanni Adorno. According to the report by Bertrandon de la Broquière, the city of Peritoq - probably meaning Peritheorion - had a Greek population in 1433.f Because the harbor was silted up by the nearby river, it was cut off from access to the sea (the ruined city is now about 2 km from the lake). This led to a great loss of importance and economic decline and was probably the reason that the city was finally abandoned. During the Ottoman Empire, the fortress was known as Bourou Kale. At the end of the 17th century only a few people lived in the city. It is believed that it was completely abandoned around this time.

== Ruins ==
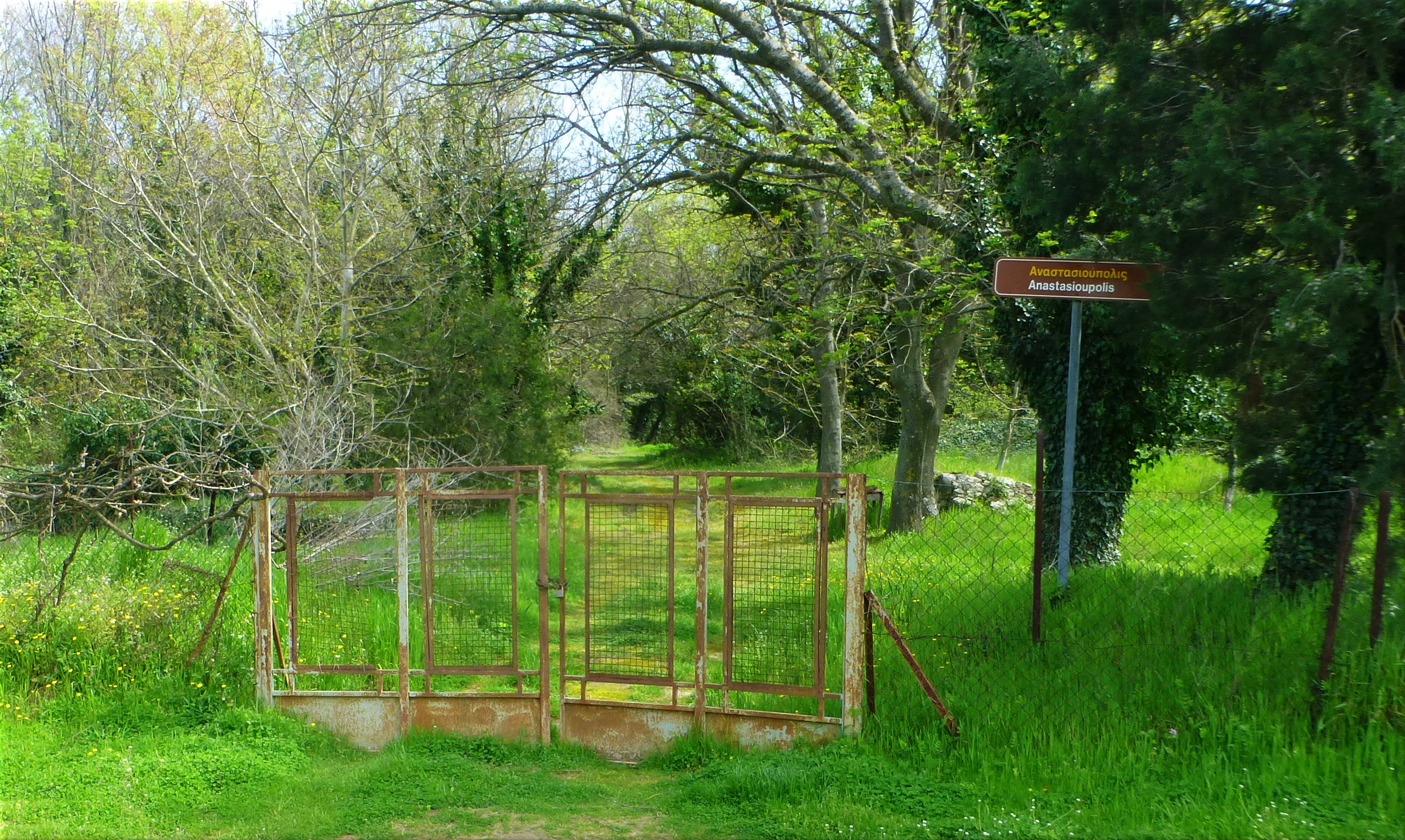
Entrance to Anastasiopolis

Since no archaeological excavations were carried out, the approximately 7.3 hectare area of the city is in a wild state. The ruins are in the middle of a forest, which, however, only emerged since the 1970s. The most important archaeological remains are the walls, some of which are several meters high. According to the only published city map, they form an irregular polygon with a maximum north-south extension of 360 meters and a maximum west-east extension of 330 meters. City gates have been documented to the northwest and southeast, as well as eight predominantly rectangular, but partly also round, wall towers in the east. In the brickwork of some towers, monograms of the imperial family of the Palaiologoi have been preserved by means of integrated bricks, which can be dated to around 1341 and thus attest at least to construction work in this phase. However, the wall that is preserved today also shows traces of older construction phases, so that the older city wall, which dates back to late antiquity, probably also had the same course.

To the north, another wall leads about 2.2 km away from the city wall to the mountain slopes of the Rhodope Mountains, which was provided with at least three towers. Its course can still be clearly seen today using aerial archeology. The building structures can also be seen from the ground. This is the aqueduct mentioned by Prokopios, which Justinian had built to supply the city with drinking water. In the first place, however, it seems to have been a fortress wall with which the Via Egnatia was to be controlled at this narrowing of the coastal plain and in which only an additional aqueduct was laid. A harbor area was connected to the south of the city. This was protected by two wall sections that ran from the city wall to the coast. However, there are only a few archaeological reports of such findings, so the exact shape of these facilities is still unclear. Presumably, all of the fortification measures mentioned served together to secure the narrowing of the coastal plain between the Rhodope Mountains and the Aegean coast with a barrage at this point, for example to facilitate defense in the event of enemy incursions.

Despite the overgrowth of the entire city area as well as the wall to the Rhodope Mountains, at least one circular path is kept free, which leads to the ruins. There is no precise signage from the street. On the Xanthi-Komotini route, turn off at the underpass of the highway in the village of Amaxades and follow the paved dirt road. The remaining 2 km of dirt road are easy to drive without a 4WD. The entrance gate is on the north side. Since it is usually locked, you enter the ruins through the loose grille in the gate.

== Sources ==
- Reinert, Steven W. (1991). "Peritheorion". In Kazhdan, Alexander (ed.). The Oxford Dictionary of Byzantium. Oxford and New York: Oxford University Press. p. 1630. ISBN 0-19-504652-8.
- Soustal, Peter (1991). Tabula Imperii Byzantini, Band 6: Thrakien (Thrakē, Rodopē und Haimimontos) (in German). Vienna: Verlag der Österreichischen Akademie der Wissenschaften. ISBN 978-3-7001-1898-5.
- Schmidts, Thomas (2017). "Die Befestigung des Hafens von Anastasiopolis. Eine justinianische Baumaßnahme in Südthrakien". In Johannes Fouquet; et al. (eds.). Argonautica. Festschrift für Reinhard Stupperich (in German). Marsberg/Padberg: Scriptorium. pp. 293–304.
