= Biston =

Ancestor of the Bistonians in Greek myth

In Greek mythology, Biston (/ˈbɪstən/ BIST-ən; Ancient Greek: Βίστων or Βιστών, romanized: Bístōn) was the ancestor of the Bistonians, a Thracian people. He is said to be the son of Ares and Callirrhoe.

== Genealogy ==
In the Ethnica by the 6th-century AD grammarian Stephanus of Byzantium, Biston is said to be the son of Ares and Callirrhoe, the daughter of Nestus, a river god. His two brothers are called Odomas and Edonus (eponyms of two Thracian tribes, the Odomanti and the Edoni). Alternately, Stephanus writes, he was considered the son of Paeon and a grandson of Ares. A scholiast on Apollonius of Rhodes, citing the Hellenistic writer Philostephanus, reports that Biston was the offspring of Cicon. According to the 12th-century AD lexicon Etymologicum Magnum, he was the son of Terpsichore, one of the Muses.

== Mythology ==
Biston built the city of Bistonia on the shores of Lake Bistonis in Thrace. He also introduced the Thracian practice of tattooing both men and women with eye-like patterns as a magical fetish, in response to an oracle which guaranteed victory against the neighbouring Edonians tribe if so adorned. The Thracian Bistonians were famous for their warlike nature and cult of Ares whom they worshipped in the form of an upright standing sword.

== See also ==
- Bistones
- Bistonis, the nymph who lives at Lake Bistonis.

== Sources ==
- Etymologicum Magnum, edited by Friderici Sylburgii, Leipzig, J. A. G. Weigel, 1816. Internet Archive.
- Hoefer, Ulrich, "Biston (2)", in Realencyclopädie der classischen Altertumswissenschaft, Band III, Halbband 1, edited by Georg Wissowa, Stuttgart, J. B. Metzler, 1897. Wikisource.
- Stephanus of Byzantium, Stephani Byzantii Ethnica: Volumen I Alpha - Gamma, edited by Margarethe Billerbeck, in collaboration with Jan Felix Gaertner, Beatrice Wyss and Christian Zubler, De Gruyter, 2006. ISBN 978-3-110-17449-6. doi:10.1515/9783110202816.
