= Rhodope (mythology) =

Several characters in Greek mythology

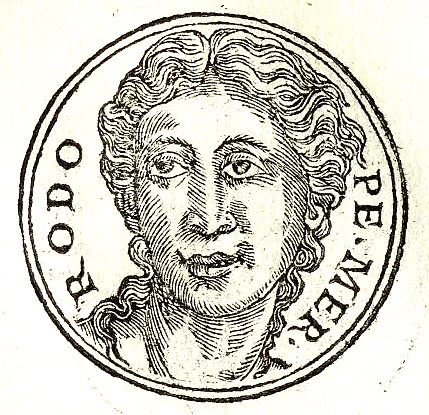
Rhodope from Guillaume Rouillé's Promptuarii Iconum Insigniorum

In Greek mythology, Rhodope (Ancient Greek: Ancient Greek: Ῥοδόπη, lit. 'rose-colored, rosy-eyed, red-faced') may refer to several different characters:

- Rhodope, one of the 3,000 Oceanids, water-nymph daughters of the Titans Oceanus and his sister-wife Tethys. She was one of the playmates of Persephone in the meadows of Sicily when the latter was abducted by her uncle Hades to be his queen in the underworld.
- Rhodope, a queen of Thrace and the wife of King Haemus. She and her husband were vain and haughty and compared themselves to Zeus and Hera, who were offended and changed the couple into mountains—the Haemus Mons and the Rhodopes respectively.
- Rhodope, a Naiad daughter of Strymon who consorted with Poseidon and became the mother of Athos.
- Rhodope, who was said to have coupled with Apollo and bore to him Cicon, eponym of the Cicones.
