= Bistonis =

Nymph in Greek mythology

Bistonis (Ancient Greek: Βιστονίς) is a nymph in Greek mythology who gave birth to a son of Ares, Tereus. Although she is mentioned in several surviving classical texts, she is the main subject of few or none. In at least one poem, written by Moschus in the 3rd century BCE, Lake Bistonis, in Thrace, is referred to as being her lake, and that lake is described as having a population of nymphs:

Tell all the nymphs by Bistonis’ clear lake,

The Orpheus of the Dorian isle is dead.

Her name is similar to the name of a city in Thrace, Bistonia, said in ancient Greek mythology to have been built on the shores of that lake by Biston, who was the son of Ares and Callirrhoe.
