= Anastasiopolis =

Anastasiopolis or Anastasioupolis (Ancient Greek: Αναστασιούπολις, "city of Anastasios"), is the name given several ancient cities founded or rebuilt by Roman emperors named Anastasius:

== In modern Turkey ==
- Dara (Mesopotamia) in the Roman province of Mesopotamia, in modern Mardin Province, Turkey
- Anastasiopolis in Galatia, modern Beypazarı, Asian Turkey
- Anastasiopolis (Phrygia), a city in Phrygia, near Laodicea on the Lycus
- Telmessos, modern Fethiye, Turkey

== Elsewhere ==
- Anastasioupolis-Peritheorion, a former town near Amaxades, Thrace, Greece
- Resafa, Syria, also known as Sergiopolis
