= Abderus =

Son of the god Hermes

In Greek mythology, Abderus or Abderos (Ancient Greek: Ἄβδηρος, romanized: Ábdēros, lit. 'son of battle') was a divine hero, reputed by some to be one of Heracles' lovers (eromenoi), and reputedly a son of Hermes by some accounts, and eponym of Abdera, Thrace.

== Family ==
Apollodorus say he was the son of the god Hermes and a native of Opus in Locris. Pindar makes Abderus a son of Poseidon and Thronia, while Photius writes that he was brother of Patroclus, and according to Hellanicus (who considers him the son of Hermes), he was Heracles' lover.

== Mythology ==
Abderus was mostly known for his tragic role in Heracles' Eighth Labor. Along with others, he helped Heracles capture the four savage mares of Diomedes the king of the Thracian Bistones. Heracles overpowered the grooms and drove the Mares of Diomedes into the sea and left them in the care of Abderus. However, while Heracles was away the horses killed Abderus, either by dragging him behind them after he lost control of them, or by devouring him.

Heracles was heartbroken upon Abderus's death, weeping, hugging and wailing over what remained of his lover. Heracles buried Abderus in a ceremonial tomb, with a bowl containing a kalos inscription of affection. Heracles then founded the city of Abdera near Abderus's tomb, where agones (Greek: ἀγῶνες), athletic games consisting of boxing, pancratium and wrestling were held in his honor (but chariot races were banned in respect of how he died).

== Iconography ==
Abderus' presence in surviving artistic sources is uncertain. In scenes where Heracles is present along with the horses and a figure on the ground or being consumed, there nothing that distinguishes the body as that of Abderus as opposed to that of the groom or Diomedes himself. His presence is likewise unclear on several intaglios from the 1st-2nd centuries BCE which probably show the labour. A man, presumed to be Diomedes, is lying in a manger, about to be devoured by the horses looming over him while a naked youth stands to the side. There is nothing that would positively identify the figure as Abderus, but he is the only youth associated with the story. Thus, if the scene is indeed that of Diomedes being eaten by the horses, Abderus is a likely candidate for the identity of the figure (the other possibility being the groom).
