= Merope (region) =

In the 14th-century Balkans, Merope (Greek: Μερόπη, Bulgarian: Меропа, Meropa) was a subregion of Thrace in modern Northern Greece and southern Bulgaria. The region lay in the western and middle part of the Rhodope Mountains.

The term is only found in the writings of Byzantine Emperor John VI Kantakouzenos. Merope extended to the Nestos River in the west and to the town of Gratianopolis in the east. Bulgarian historian Plamen Pavlov defines Merope as encompassing the course of the Arda River up north until the Chepelare River and including the fortresses Sveta Irina ("Saint Irene") and Podvis.

In 1343, John VI Kantakouzenos granted Merope to Bulgarian brigand Momchil for his military assistance in the Byzantine civil war of 1341–1347. After Momchil changed sides in the civil war and was ultimately defeated by Kantakouzenos in 1345, Merope returned to Byzantine sovereignty.
