= Battle of Peritheorion =

1345 battle in Greece

Coordinates: 41.103349°N 25.090807°E

- Part of the Byzantine civil war of 1341–1347
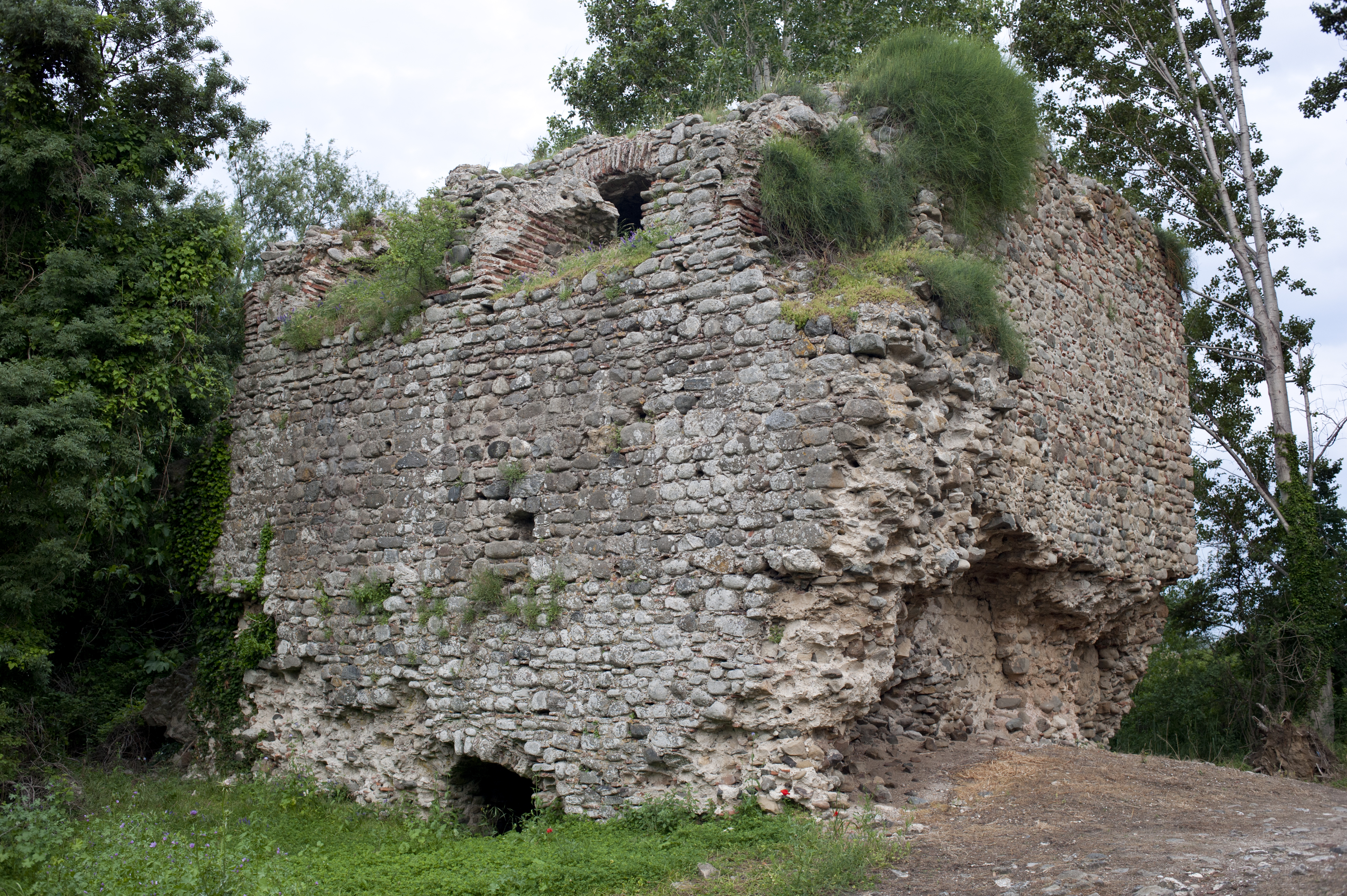
- Fortifications at Peritheorion
| Date | 7 July 1345 |
| Location | Peritheorion, Greece |
| Result | Kantakouzenist victory |

Belligerents
| Momchil's principality | Forces of John VI Kantakouzenos; Emirate of Aydin |

Commanders and leaders
| Momchil † | John VI Kantakouzenos; Umur Beg |

Strength
| 5,000 infantry, 300 cavalry | over 20,000 |

Casualties and losses
| Heavy | Unknown |

The Battle of Peritheorion on 7 July 1345 was between the forces of Momchil, the quasi-independent ruler of Rhodope, and an allied Byzantine-Turkish force headed by John VI Kantakouzenos and Umur Bey of Aydin. The two armies met in front of the walls of the city of Peritheorion (now in ruins), and the battle resulted in a crushing victory for the allied army, with Momchil himself falling in the field.

== Origins of the conflict ==
From 1341, a civil war had been going on in the Byzantine Empire between the regency for the infant John V Palaiologos and the former regent John VI Kantakouzenos. In this conflict, both sides called upon aid from neighbouring states. Kantakouzenos initially relied upon aid by Stefan Dushan of Serbia, but in 1343, the arrival of his old friend and ally, Umur Bey, greatly strengthened his position.

In the same year, Momchil, a Bulgarian brigand active in the northern Rhodope mountains, pledged allegiance to Kantakouzenos. He was rewarded with the title of sebastokrator and given the governance of the region of Merope, stretching from east of the Nestos river to the vicinity of Komotini. In the next year however, Umur Bey was forced to withdraw with his forces to Anatolia, and Momchil defected to the regency's side, for which he was rewarded with the title of despotes. He began raiding the lands still loyal to Kantakouzenos and harassing the small Turkish forces left to Kantakouzenos, achieving a small victory when he burned a number of their ships at Porto Lago. By the time Umur returned in force in spring 1345, Momchil, taking advantage of his position in the no man's land between the warring Serbian, Bulgarian and Byzantine states, had established himself as a virtually independent prince in the area of the Rhodope.

== Battle ==
In late spring of 1345, Umur arrived again at Thrace with a force of reputedly 20,000 men. He and Kantakouzenos then proceeded to subdue Momchil. The two armies met outside Peritheorion on 7 July. The right flank is command by Umur and the left flank by byzantine noble John Asen, brother of empress Irene Asanina and son of Andronikos Asen. Momchil tried to avoid the far larger enemy force by retreating within the walls of Peritheorion, but its citizens shut the gates against him. The ensuing battle was a rout, as the far more numerous Turks crushed Momchil's army and killed him in the process.

== Aftermath ==
After his death, Kantakouzenos' forces regained the Merope region. However, the role played by the Turks in this battle presaged late events, as the Ottoman conquest of the Balkans would begin barely a few years later. Momchil's colourful career and his perceived role as a defender against the Turks secured him an important place in the epic folklore of the region.

== Sources ==
- Fine, John V. A. (1994) [1987]. The Late Medieval Balkans: A Critical Survey from the Late Twelfth Century to the Ottoman Conquest. Ann Arbor, Michigan: University of Michigan Press. ISBN 978-0-472-10079-8.
