= Momchil =

Bulgarian brigand

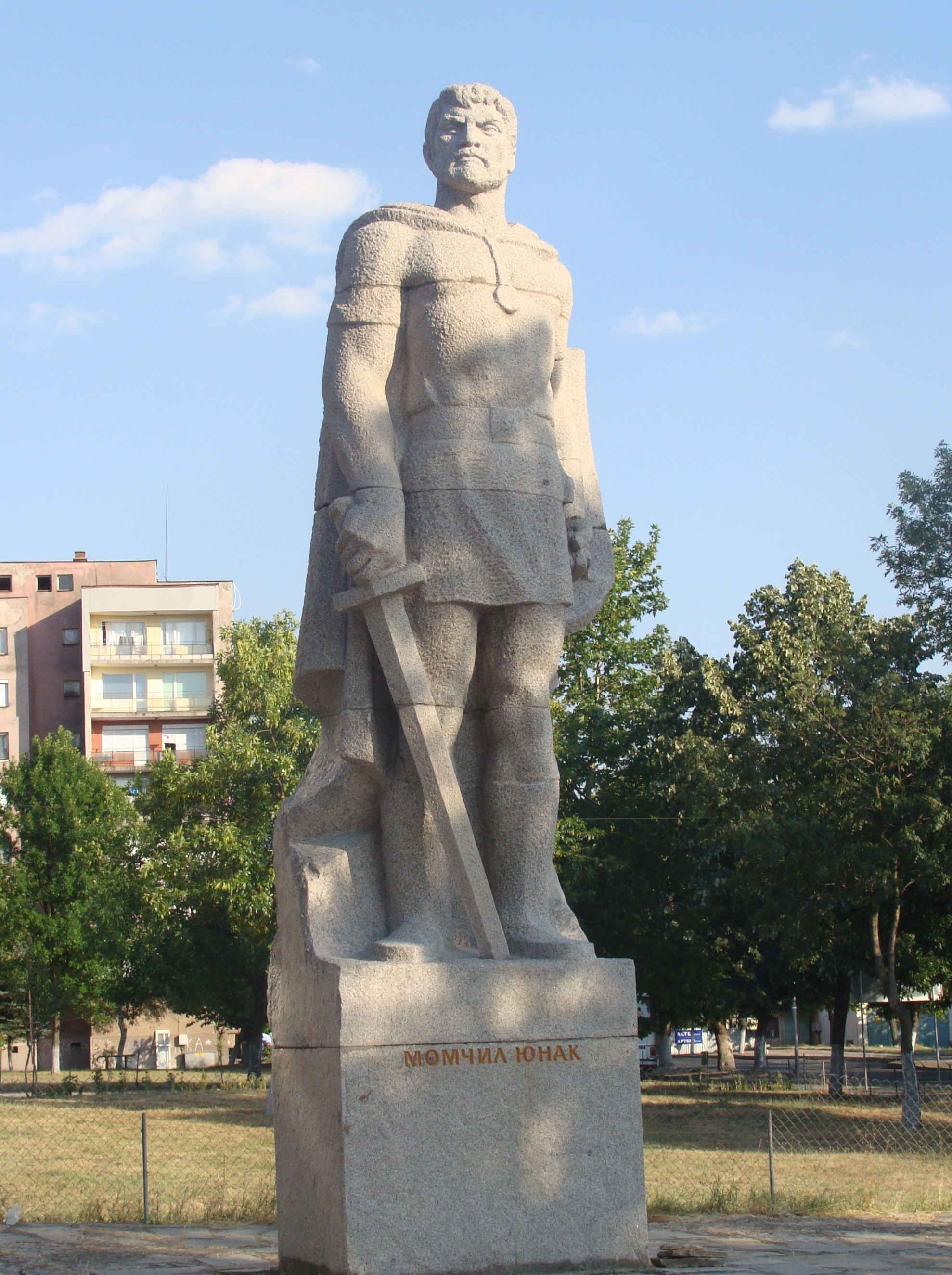
- Monument to Momchil in Momchilgrad, Bulgaria
- Born: c. 1305
- Died: 7 July 1345 (aged 39–40); Peritheorion
- Occupations: Brigand, military leader
- Known for: Quasi-independent lord in the Rhodope area, 1343–1345
- Title: sebastokratōr
- Military career
- Allegiance: Byzantine Empire (Serbian Empire) Serbian Kingdom/Empire
- Service years: 1341–1344
- Conflicts: Byzantine civil war; Peritheorion†

Momchil (Bulgarian: Момчил, Greek: Μομ[ι]τζίλος or Μομιτζίλας, Serbian: Момчило / Momčilo; c. 1305 – 7 July 1345) was a 14th-century Bulgarian brigand and local ruler. Initially a member of a bandit gang in the borderlands of Bulgaria, Byzantium and Serbia, Momchil was recruited by the Byzantines as a mercenary. Through his opportunistic involvement in the Byzantine civil war of 1341–1347, where he played the various sides against each other, he became ruler of a large area in the Rhodopes and western Thrace.

Momchil achieved initial successes against Turks and Byzantines alike, setting Turkish ships on fire and almost managing to kill one of his main opponents at the time, John VI Kantakouzenos. Despite this, he was defeated and killed by a joint Byzantine–Turkish army in 1345. Due to his opposition to the Turks, he is remembered in popular South Slavic legend as a fighter against the Turkish invasion of the Balkans.

== Brigandage and role in the Byzantine civil war ==
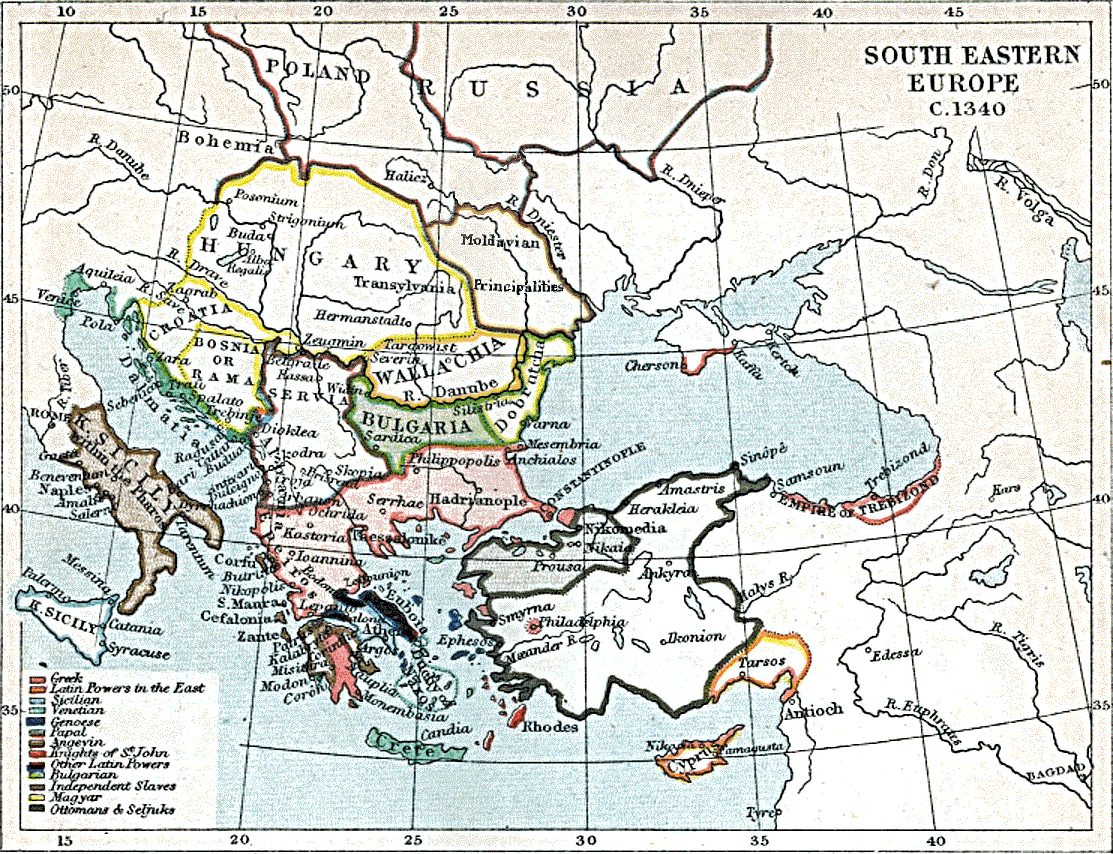
The Balkans and Anatolia in 1340. Momchil was active in the area where Byzantium, Serbia and Bulgaria met.

Contemporary and near-contemporary accounts describe Momchil physically as "imposing in appearance", "as tall as two men" and, in the words of a Turkish poet, "resembling a minaret". According to a contemporary source, Momchil was a native of the "border area of Bulgarians and Serbs", which at the time straddled the Rhodopes and the Pirin mountains. The claim that Momchil was born in that region may be reinforced by 15th-century Ottoman registers, according to which his name was the most popular male name in that area. There exist at least a few legends which tie his birth to a particular place, for example the village of Fakia in Strandzha, though evidence is nonexistent. In any case, Momchil was born of humble origin. This was a main factor in his decision to join a band of brigands (hajduks) which was active in the scarcely governed border areas between Bulgaria, Byzantium and Serbia.

Persecuted by the Bulgarian authorities, some time before 1341 Momchil fled to Byzantium. He was accepted into the service of Emperor Andronikos III Palaiologos (r. 1328–1341) as a mercenary and tasked with the protection of the territories he previously plundered. However, his brigand activities did not cease. Momchil regularly raided Bulgarian lands, which negatively impacted Byzantine–Bulgarian relations. Undesired by the Byzantines and "detestable to the Bulgarians", he deserted the Byzantine army and fled to Serbia to serve its ruler Stephen Dušan. In Serbia, he formed a company of 2,000 trusted men, both Bulgarians and Serbs. Based on Serbian epic poetry Momchil had a sister, Alena, who later became Queen Consort of Serbia, from 1365 until 1371.

During the Byzantine civil war of 1341–1347, Momchil joined the forces of John VI Kantakouzenos (r. 1341–1354), who had perhaps known Momchil during his flight to Serbia in 1342, at the beginning of the war. In 1343, as per the wishes of the local population, Kantakouzenos gave Momchil governance of the region of Merope in the Rhodope Mountains, a virtual no man's land plagued by nomadic Slavic brigands. In the words of Kantakouzenos himself, the appointment was because "[Momchil] was of the same race these nomads would be favourably disposed toward him, but also because he was not lacking in courage and boldness in battle and was a first-rate expert in robbery and plunder." As the governor of Merope, Momchil gathered of an army of 300 cavalry and 5,000 infantry from different nationalities. Though he considered himself able to "set against any side in the Byzantine war", along with Umur Bey's Turkish forces he nevertheless assisted Kantakouzenos in his campaigns in 1344.

At the time, Momchil was approached by agents of Kantakouzenos' opponents, the Constantinopolitan regency, and persuaded to turn against him. Thinking that Kantakouzenos and his Turkish allies from the Emirate of Aydin were far away in eastern Thrace, he attacked a Turkish fleet of 15 ships near Portolagos and sank three of them. He then overcame another Turkish force that arrived to exact retribution near the fortress of Peritheorion (also known as Burugrad), and plundered several cities in the area that refused to surrender. Afterwards, Momchil along with 1,000 horsemen attacked Kantakouzenos, who had set camp near Komotini with only 60 horsemen to protect him. The Byzantines were thoroughly routed: Kantakouzenos' horse was killed and he received a powerful hit to the head, which he survived thanks to his helmet. Momchil captured many of Kantakouzenos' men, but the claimant to the throne himself managed to escape in the turmoil.

Soon, however, Momchil sent messages to Kantakouzenos asking for forgiveness. The latter, loath to alienate Momchil and open another front in his rear, pardoned him in exchange for promises of future good conduct, and even awarded him the title of sebastokrator. Momchil nevertheless continued to entertain parallel ties with the regency, and even secured the title of despotes from the Empress Anna of Savoy.

== Ruler in the Rhodopes and death ==
In the summer of 1344, Momchil finally broke with both parties and seceded from the Byzantine Empire. He proclaimed himself an independent ruler in the Rhodopes and the Aegean coast, "capturing cities and villages and appearing all-powerful and invincible". With his army he captured Xanthi, which became the capital of his domain. Bulgarian historian Plamen Pavlov theorises that Momchil was in friendly relations with Bulgarian emperor Ivan Alexander (r. 1331–1371), with whom he shared a lengthy border, and believes the two may have acted in co-ordination against the Byzantines.

In late spring 1345 however, Kantakouzenos, reinforced with allegedly 20,000 troops from Aydin under their ruler Umur Bey, marched against Momchil. Momchil tried to prevent this by asking again for pardon and offering to submit to Kantakouzenos, but the emperor refused to heed him.

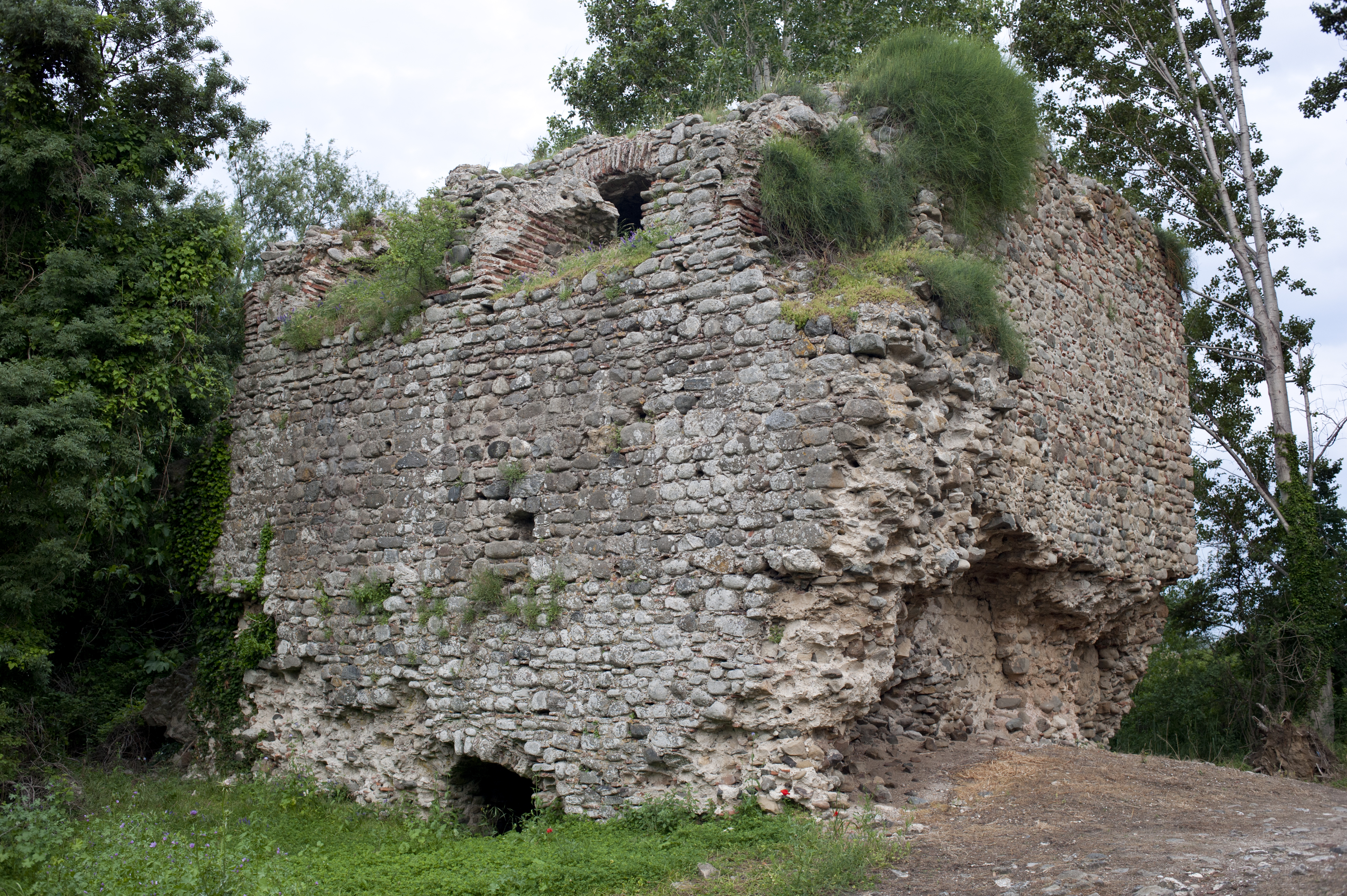
Fortifications at Peritheorion near Amaxades, northeast Greece, site of Momchil's last stand and death in 1345

The two armies met near Peritheorion on 7 July 1345. Momchil tried to seek refuge behind the city's walls — scholars debate whether he actually held the city or not — but they were shut against him and his men by the locals. The locals did let in Momchil's cousin Rayko along with 50 men, which they hoped would persuade Momchil not to take vengeance on the city if he defeated his opponents. In the subsequent battle before the city walls, Momchil's forces used the Peritheorion's ruined old fortifications as a first line of defence, with the city walls behind them.

After the foremost Turkish troops crossed the fortifications and dealt with the Bulgarian defenders, they began plundering the vicinity. However, to the surprise of Kantakouzenos and Umur Bey, the majority of Momchil's men were standing in front of the city walls and had not yet participated in the skirmishes. As the Byzantine–Turkish force advanced towards the defenders, Momchil led his troops ahead into battle. His cavalry was promptly eliminated by Turkish sharpshooters and his remaining troops were surrounded on three sides by heavily armed horsemen. Momchil's remaining men continued the fight on foot and for the most part did not surrender until Momchil himself perished.

Out of respect for Momchil, Kantakouzenos spared his wife, a Bulgarian woman he had captured during his conquest of Xanthi. He allowed her to flee to Bulgaria along with all of her property. However, it is unknown whether Momchil had any children from this marriage or a previous one, if any. Pavlov presents the hypothesis that Momchil's wife was a noblewoman from the Bulgarian capital Tarnovo, whom he married as part of an agreement with the Bulgarian court.

== In popular culture ==
In Bulgarian and South Slavic folklore in general, Momchil is glorified in numerous songs and epic tales as a brigand, defender of the people and a prominent fighter against the Turks. Indeed, some of the earliest heroic songs in Bulgarian folklore tradition deal with Momchil's exploits. In some folklore material, Momchil, referred to as a duke, acts as the uncle of Prince Marko, another legendary figure who in epic poetry is a fighter against the Turks. In the folklore version of Momchil's last battle, Vidosava, his wife, and not the citizens of Peritheorion, betrays him and is to blame for his death. On the other hand, Momchil's legendary sister Yevrosima is described as the mother of Prince Marko as well as a major influence on him.

The town of Momchilgrad and the village of Momchilovtsi in southern Bulgaria, as well as Momchil Peak on Greenwich Island of the South Shetland Islands in Antarctica are named after Momchil. His life served as the basis for an opera piece, eponymously named Momchil and written by Bulgarian composer Lyubomir Pipkov. Momchil's biography also inspired a 1988 children's comic book, The Lord of Merope, which tells a largely fictionalised version of his story.

== Sources ==
- Андреев, Йордан; Лазаров, Иван; Павлов, Пламен (1999). Кой кой е в средновековна България [Who is Who in Medieval Bulgaria] (in Bulgarian). Петър Берон. ISBN 978-954-402-047-7.
- Fine, John Van Antwerp (1994), The Late Medieval Balkans: A Critical Survey from the Late Twelfth Century to the Ottoman Conquest, University of Michigan Press, ISBN 978-0-472-08260-5
- Kazhdan, Alexander, ed. (1991), "Momčilo", Oxford Dictionary of Byzantium, Oxford University Press, pp. 1390–1391, ISBN 978-0-19-504652-6
- Павлов, Пламен (2005). "Родопският юнак Момчил и цар Иван Александър" [The Rhodopean hero Momchil and Tsar Ivan Alexander]. Бунтари и авантюристи в средновековна България [Rebels and Venturers in Medieval Bulgaria] (in Bulgarian). Varna: LiterNet.
- Soulis, George Christos (1984), "Momčilo", The Serbs and Byzantium during the Reign of Tsar Stephen Dušan (1331–1355) and his Successors, Dumbarton Oaks, pp. 149–150, ISBN 0-88402-137-8
