= Syleus (mythology) =

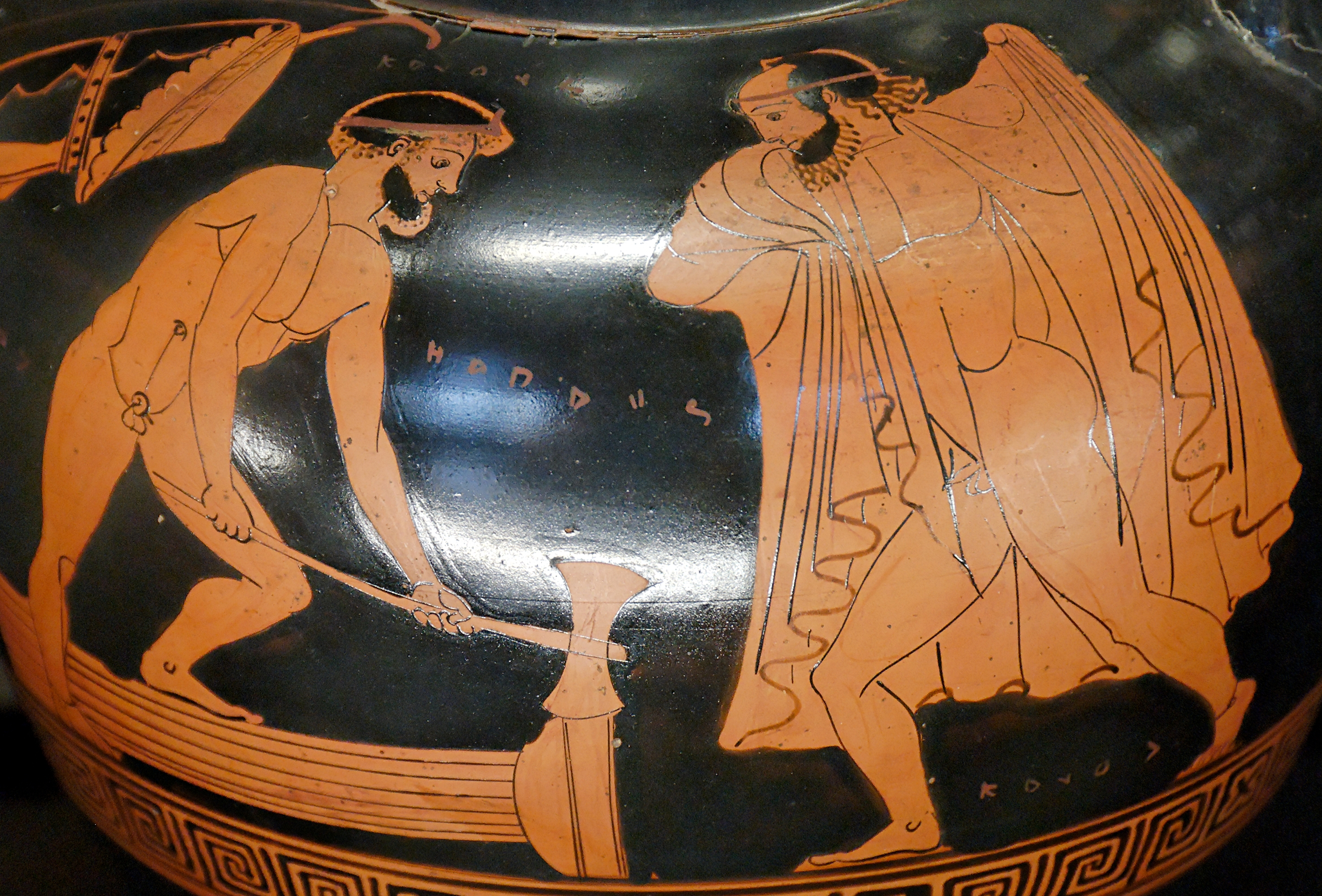
Heracles and Syleus on an Attic red-figure amphora (480–470 BC) by the Oionokles Painter

In Greek mythology, Syleus (Ancient Greek: Συλεύς) was a man of Aulis, Lydia killed by Heracles for his nefarious deeds. He was the father of Xenodoce.

== Mythology ==
In most versions Syleus owned a vineyard and forced all passers-by to dig it, which he might have attempted to do to Heracles as well. Heracles killed Syleus with the latter's own hoe and burned his vineyard down to the root. He also killed Xenodice.

According to Conon, Syleus had a brother Dicaeus; their father was Poseidon. Unlike Syleus, Dicaeus was a just man, which was suggested by the very literal meaning of his name, and received Heracles hospitably after the hero had done away with Syleus. Heracles fell in love with the daughter of Syleus, who had been raised by her uncle, and married her. Soon, however, he left and his newlywed wife missed him so much that she died of grief. Upon return, Heracles learned of her death and was about to throw himself onto her funeral pyre, but those present at the funeral ceremony managed to dissuade him from doing so. A temple of Heracles was erected next to her tomb.

== Adaptations ==
- A. Rozokoki, Euripides' Syleus, satyric. A reconstruction (for theatrical performance), 2019 (in Greek)
