= Hawks of Thrace =

Greek terrorist organization

Hawks of Thrace (HoT) is a possibly defunct, anti-Turkish, pro-Kurdish independence Greek terrorist organization based in Thrace, Greece.

The HoT launched a bomb attack on the Turkish consulate-general in Komotini on 8 February 1999 in support of Kurdistan Workers' Party (PKK) leader Abdullah Öcalan. One member of the bomb disposal squad was wounded, and the building sustained minor damage. This was the only action this group has ever carried out.
