= Cicon =

Son of Apollo and Rhodope in Greek mythology

In Greek mythology, Cicon (Ancient Greek: Κίκων, romanized: Kíkon) was the eponym of the Thracian tribe Cicones. He was the son of Apollo and Rhodope. According to a scholium on Apollonius of Rhodes, the Hellenistic writer Philostephanus considered Cicon to be the father of Biston.
