= Diomedes of Thrace =

Son of Ares and Cyrene in Greek mythology

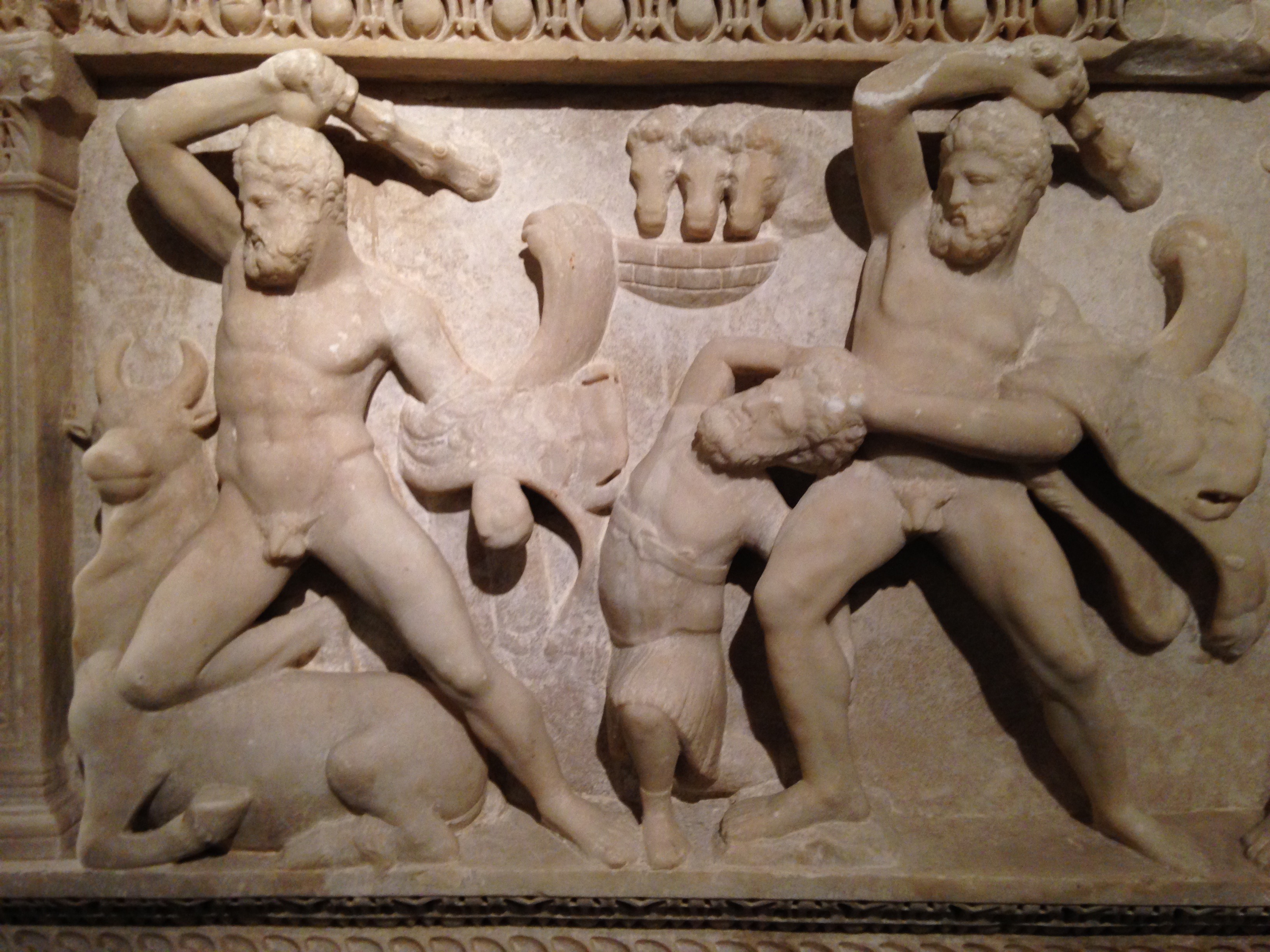
Heracles kills Diomedes and takes his mares on a marble Roman sarcophagus from Perge, now in the Antalya Museum.

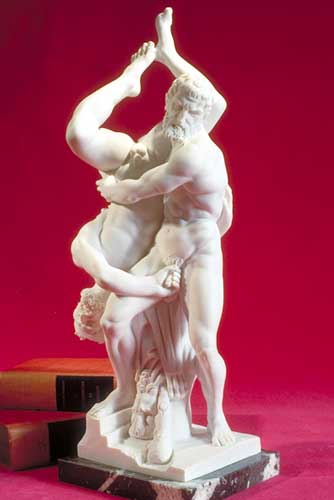
Hercules and Diomedes, from a 16th-century original at the Palazzo Vecchio in Florence, Italy; one of six marble statues representing "The Labours of Hercules" by Vincenzo de’ Rossi.

In Greek mythology, King Diomedes of Thrace (Ancient Greek: Διομήδης) was the son of Ares and Cyrene. He lived on the shores of the Black Sea ruling the warlike tribe of Bistones. He is known for his man-eating horses, which Heracles stole in order to complete the eighth of his Twelve Labours, slaying Diomedes in the process.

== Mythology ==
Heracles encounters King Diomedes during his eight labour, for which Eurystheus ordered Heracles to capture the man-eating mares of Diomedes. Heracles travelled to the shores of the Black Sea to meet King Diomedes. King Diomedes was a savage; he enjoyed feeding strangers and prisoners to his mares.

The earliest surviving literary account of the labour is found in a fragment of Pindar preserved in the Oxyrhynchus Papyri. The surviving details have Heracles entering Diomedes' palace at night and distracting the mares – chained by single bronze chain to a stone manger – by throwing a man, presumably a stablehand, into the manger. Whilst the mares are tearing their victim apart, Heracles is able to break the chain and drive them away. Although it cannot be fully confirmed due to lacunae, the surviving text suggest that Diomedes died whilst attempting to prevent the theft of the horses. In the later accounts of Diodorus Siculus (fl. 1st century BCE) and Pomponius Mela (late 1st century BCE– c. 45 CE), it is Diomedes himself who is fed to the horses. It is implied in Diodorus' account that, after eating the man who had taught them to eat human flesh, the horses returned to the more common diet for horses. Lactantius Placidus (c. 350–400 CE), a scholiast on Statius states in explicitly. After this Heracles is able to control the mares and bring them back to Tiryns to show Eurystheus his completion of the labour.

Other versions of the story claim that Heracles was accompanied by a band of volunteers to assist in acquiring Diomedes' mares. Rather than wrestling Diomedes alone Heracles entrusts the mares to his lover Abderos. While Heracles and his men defeat Diomedes and his Bistone army, young Abderos is unable to control the mares and is killed in the process. Heracles, grieved by the fate of Abderos, builds a city named Abdera in his name. Other versions also may include the addition of a chariot. Either Heracles attaches the mares to his chariot to tame them or he takes them along with the chariot of Diomedes.

== Namesake ==
Diomedes Lake in Antarctica is named after Diomedes of Thrace.
