= Momchilgrad =

Town in Kardzhali Province, Bulgaria

Momchilgrad Момчилград
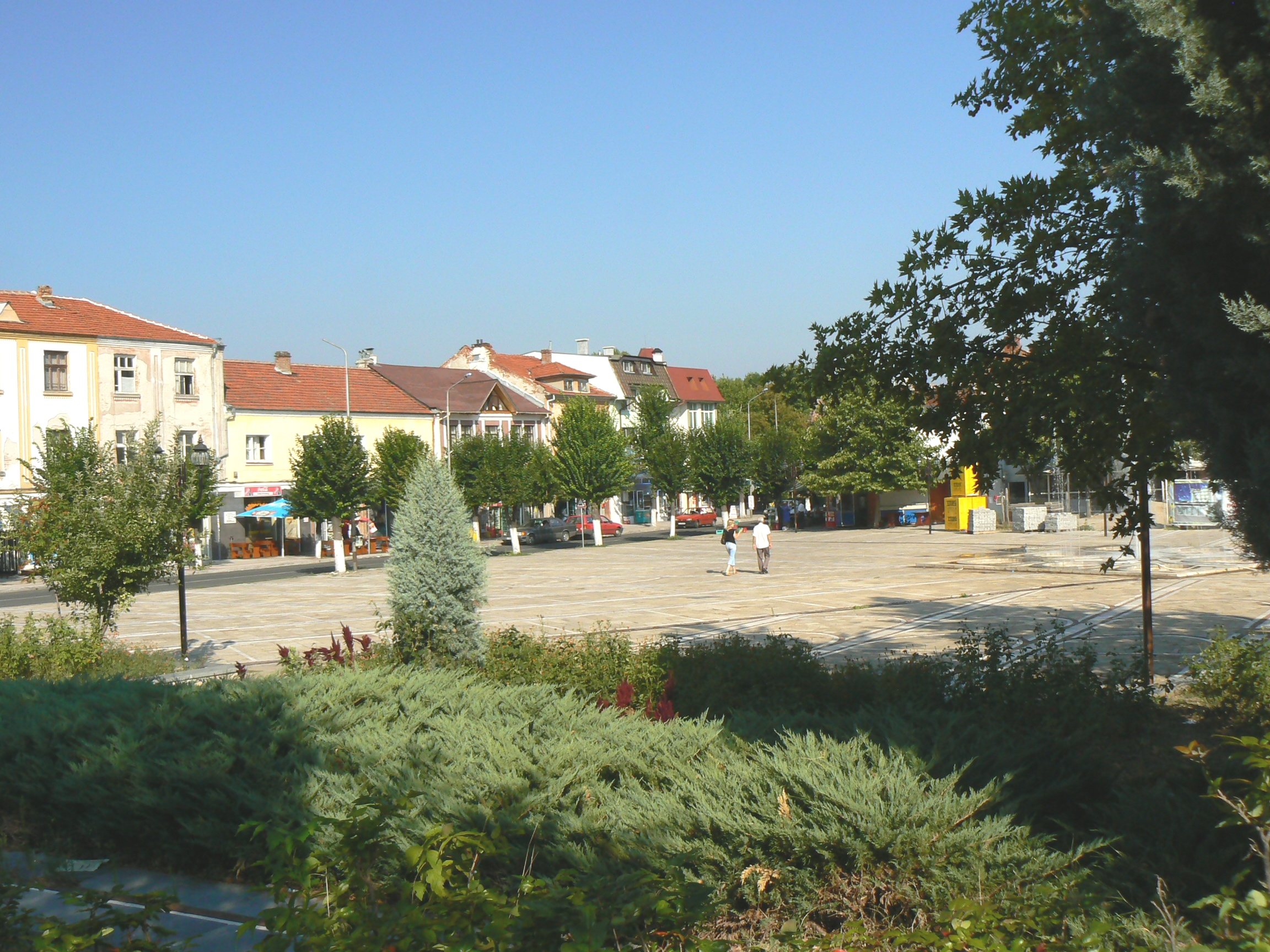
- Town square

- Location of Momchilgrad
- Coordinates: 41°32′N 25°25′E
- Country: Bulgaria
- Province (Oblast): Kardzhali
- Named for: Momchil

Government
  - Mayor: Ilknur Kazim (DPS)
- Elevation: 452 m (1,483 ft)

Population (01.02.2011)
  - Total: 7,831
- Time zone: UTC+2 (EET)
  - Summer (DST): UTC+3 (EEST)
- Postal Code: 6800
- Area code: 03631

Momchilgrad (Bulgarian: Момчилград [momˈt͡ʃiɫɡrat], lit. 'the town of Momchil', Turkish: Mestanlı) is a town in the very south of Bulgaria, part of Kardzhali Province in the southern part of the Eastern Rhodopes. According to the 2011 census, Momchilgrad is the largest Bulgarian settlement with a Turkish majority (75% of the total).

Notable natives include Petar Stoychev (b. 1976), the fastest swimmer across the English Channel until 2012, table tennis player and coach Daniela Gergelcheva (b. 1964), Turkish weightlifter Naim Süleymanoğlu (1967–2017), and singer Zdravko Zhelyazkov from the Riton pop duet.

== History ==
Momchilgrad became part of Bulgaria after the First Balkan War. The town was officially renamed to Momchilgrad from Mastanli (Bulgarian: Мастанли) in 1934, though is still known as Mestanlı by the Turkish population.
