= Tirida =

Town of ancient Thrace

Tirida, also known as Stabulum Diomedis or Stabulo Diomedis (both Latin for 'Diomedes's stable'), was a town of ancient Thrace. Pliny the Elder writes "Oppidum fuit Tirida, Diomedis equorum stabulis dirum." Diomedes of Thrace was the king of the Bistones who was in the habit of throwing strangers to be devoured by his savage horses, till at length he himself was punished in the same way by Heracles. Based on the passage of Pliny, William Smith identified Tirida with the town called Stabulum Diomedis in the Itineraries, that was located on the coast of Thrace on the Via Egnatia, 18 M.P. according to the Antonine Itinerary, 12 M.P. according to the Jerusalem Itinerary, from Porsula (or Maximianopolis in Rhodope). Also in the 19th century, William Hazlitt wrote that Stabulum Diomedis' site was that of the earlier Dicaea. Martial talks about Tyrida in his De nuptiis, noting that it was located near regio Maronea. Some have suggested the town belonged to Geto-Dacian enclave.

Modern scholarship accepts the identification of Tirida with Stabulum Diomedis, but rejects the identification with Dicaea, leaving the site of Stabulum Diomedes as unlocated but probably near Anastasioupolis. Other names borne by the settlement include Cartera Come or Kartera Kome, Turris Diomedis ('Diomedes's tower'), and Tyrida. Theodoric Strabo died here in 481 CE.
