= Dicaeus (mythology) =

Son of Poseidon

In Greek mythology, Dicaeus or Dikaios (Ancient Greek: Δίκαιος) was a son of Poseidon and brother was Syleus. They lived near the Mountain Pelion in Thessaly.

== Mythology ==
Dicaeus hosted Herakles. Unlike Syleus, who was killed by Herakles, Dicaeus was a just man, which was suggested by the very literal meaning of his name (Δίκαιος = Just).

The Dicaea city in Thrace was named after him.
