= Athos (mythology) =

Giant in Greek mythology

In Greek mythology, Athos (/ˈæθɒs/; Ancient Greek: Ἄθως, pronounced [átʰɔːs]) was a giant that Poseidon fought. He is best known for the creation of Mount Athos, a mountain and peninsula in Chalcidice, northern Greece, which is now an important centre of Eastern Orthodox monasticism. In Greek it is commonly called Άγιον Όρος, meaning 'Holy Mountain'.

== Family ==
In one account however, Athos was said to be the son of Poseidon himself by the Naiad nymph Rhodope, daughter of the river-god Strymon (the modern Struma).

== Mythology ==
The mountain took its name after this Athos, who was attacked by Poseidon, the god of the sea. The citation is incomplete, as it fails to establish that the mountain was named from the giant. Stephanus of Byzantium attributed the story to some lost work by Nicander, where he apparently described Poseidon hurling two blocks with his hands against the gigantic Athos. Eustathius of Thessalonica says that then Poseidon trapped Athos under the mountain.

== Bibliography ==
- Anonymous (1891). Jules Nicole (ed.). Scholia eis tēn Homērou Iliada [Scholia on Homer's Iliad] (in Greek). Vol. 1. Paris, France: Hachette.
- Kiessling, T.; Heindorfius, L. F. Τ, eds. (1826). Theocritus, Bion et Moschus. Vol. II. London, United Kingdom.
- Larson, Jennifer (June 28, 2001). Greek Nymphs: Myth, Cult, Lore. Oxford, New York: Oxford University Press. ISBN 0-19-512294-1.
- Nicander (1953). Gow, A. S. F.; Scholfield A. F. (eds.). Poems and Poetical Fragments. New York-Melbourne-Madrid: Cambridge University Press. ISBN 978-0-521-05822-3.
- Stephanus of Byzantium (2006). Ethica. Vol. 1 (Alpha-Sigma). Translated by Margarethe Billerbeck. Berlin, Germany: De Gruyter. ISBN 978-3-11-017449-6.
