= Dicaea (Thrace) =

Coordinates: 40°59′34″N 25°09′56″E

Dicaea or Dikaia (Ancient Greek: Δικαία or Δίκαια), also called Dikaiopolis (Ancient Greek: Δικαιόπολις) was a Greek port town on the coast of ancient Thrace on Lake Bistonis, in the country of the Bistones.

Stephanus of Byzantium wrote that it took its name from the Dicaeus (Ancient Greek: Δίκαιος) who was son of Poseidon.

The place appears to have decayed at an early period. In the 19th century, William Hazlitt wrote that its site was that of the later Stabulum Diomedis ('Diomedes's stable'), where Theodoric Strabo died in 481 CE. However, modern scholarship rejects this identification and identifies Stabulum Diomedis with Tirida.

The site of Dicaea is located about 2 miles (3.2 km) west of Mese.

== See also ==
- List of ancient Greek cities

== See also ==
- Greek colonies in Thrace
