= Mares of Diomedes =

Man-eating horses in Greek mythology

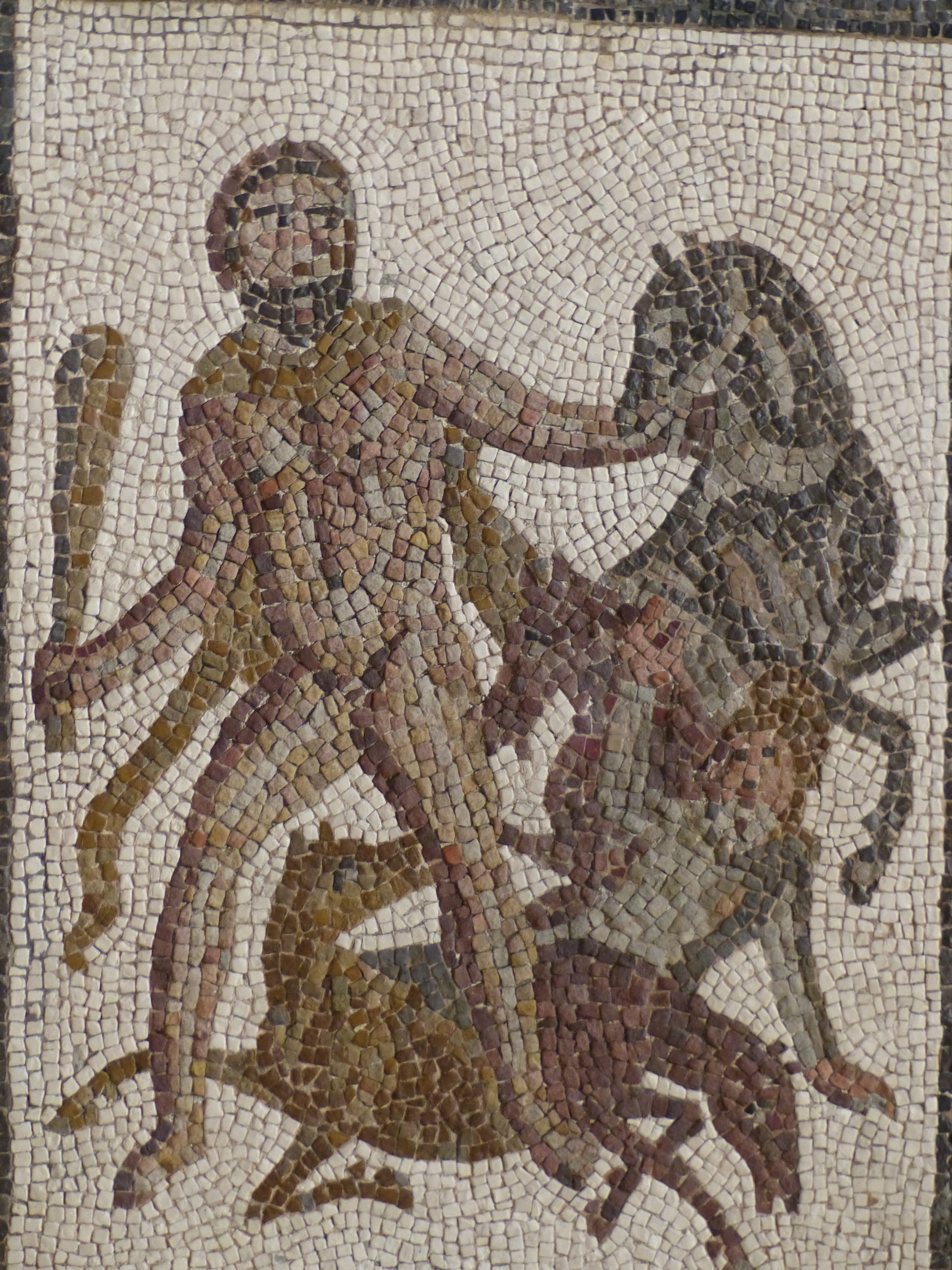
- Heracles attacking the Mares of Diomedes. Detail of a Roman mosaic from Llíria (Valencia, Spain), 3rd century CE. Now in the Museo Arqueológico Nacional.

Creature information
- Grouping: Legendary creature
- Sub grouping: Man-eating horses
- Folklore: Greek mythology

Origin
- Country: Greece
- Region: Thrace

In Greek mythology the Mares of Diomedes (Ancient Greek: Διομήδους ἵπποι, romanized: Diomēdous hippoi), were man-eating horses belonging to Diomedes of Thrace who were stabled, according to Pliny the Elder, in the now-vanished city of Tirida. The mares' diet comprised the unsuspecting guests of Diomedes. The eighth labour of Heracles was to retrieve the mares and bring them back to King Eurystheus. They were generally thought to be four in number and forming a chariot team.

In mythological traditions regarding the labours of Heracles there are two broad versions of the story relating to the mares, with variations in the details appearing in different sources. In the first, which emerges earlier in the mythic tradition, Heracles goes alone and placates or distracts the horses by feeding them someone (the groom, the charioteer, or Diomedes himself), which enables him to gain control and take them back to Eurystheus. In the second, Heracles takes a band of men with him, including his lover (eromenos) Abderus; after Heracles has taken the horses, they end up fighting Diomedes and his men, the Bistones. Heracles and his men are victorious, and Heracles kills Diomedes. Abderus, however, is killed by the horses. Heracles then takes the horses back to Eurystheus.

== The Horses ==
=== Nature ===
The exact number and gender of the horses varies between sources, but they are usually mares. In literary sources their number is rarely mentioned, but they are explicitly referred to as a four-horse chariot team by Euripides, whilst Seneca refers to their chariot driver. In early artistic sources, one horse is depicted; in later sources two to four become more common, with their identity as a chariot team sometimes indicated by a wheel as part of the scene. The horses are named in the Fabulae – in which they are also reported to be male – as Podargos, Lampon, Xanthos, and Deinos.

The reason for the horses' man-eating proclivity is given variously as being taught to them by Diomedes himself, due to them eating a certain plant in the area, or due to them drinking from the waters of the river Cossinitus.

On two objects the horses are depicted as winged. An early fifth-century BCE white-ground lekythos by the Marathon Painter Herakles is shown grappling one of four winged horses by the neck, and on a scarab from around 500 BCE, possibly of Etruscan origin, Herakles appears between rearing, winged horses.

The Roman Epicurean philosopher Lucretius (c. 99–55 BCE) makes a passing reference to the mares of Diomedes in his De rerum natura, describing them as breathing fire from their nostrils. It is possible that Lucretius is referencing Euripides' Alcestis, in which Heracles tells the chorus that he would only have trouble putting the bit in the mouths of the horses if they breathed fire. The chorus replies that they do not breath fire, explaining instead that they are man-eating. Per Daniel Ogden, Lucretius could be making a witty allusion to Euripides' play, or he could was aware of a tradition in which the mares were fire-breathing, which Euripides himself was rejecting in the play.

=== Lineage ===
In his commentary on the Aeneid, Servius claims that the horses of Diomedes Tydides (who fought at Troy) were descended from those of the Thracian Diomedes. Will W. de Grummond suggests that Servius is attempting to account for a perceived conflation by Vergil of the two Diomedes, but argues that the genealogy of the animals given in the Iliad itself makes this interpretation of Vergil's work unlikely, suggesting instead that the horses being referred to are those that Diomedes Tydides stole from Rhesus of Thrace.

== The Eighth Labour of Heracles ==
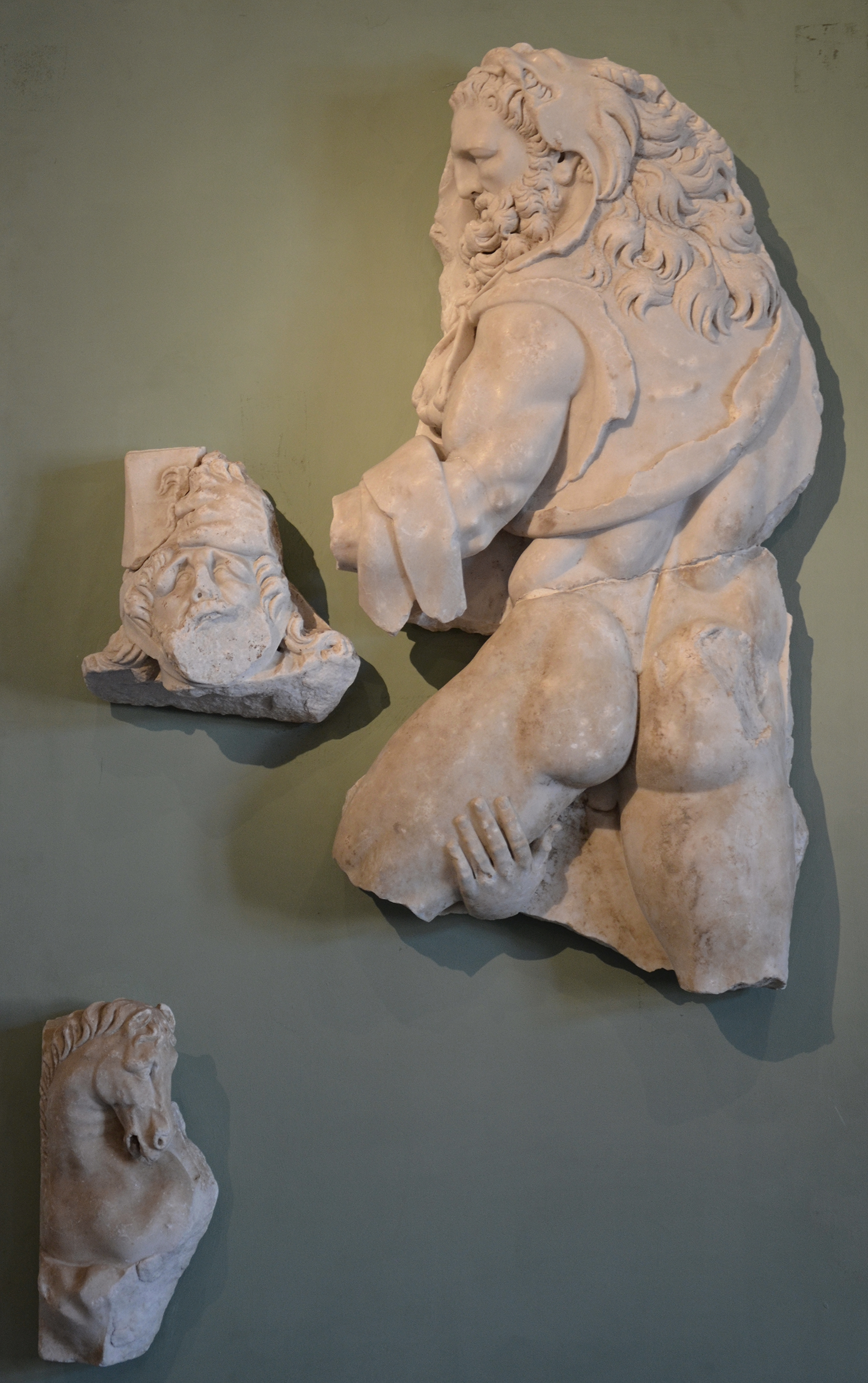
Heracles holds a kneeing Diomedes by the hair whilst Diomedes grabs Heracles' leg in an act of supplication. Marble relief from the Roman villa of Chiragan, end of 3rd century CE. Currently in the Musée Saint-Raymond, Toulouse, France.

=== Early representation ===
The earliest known potential reference to the labour was on the Amyclae Throne by Bathycles c. 550 BCE, which itself survives only in the description given by Pausanias (c. 110 – c. 180 CE). His description of the depiction is simply that Heracles was shown avenging himself upon Diomedes. No references to the horses or any other figures are made. John Boardman, however, suggests that Pausanias was mistaken in his identification, because Diomedes is not otherwise depicted in this scene in surviving art until the advanced Hellenistic period.

Two vases provide the first surviving depictions of the labour. The scene is depicted on a black-figure cup by the Late Archaic Greek vase painter Psiax, dated to the end of the sixth century BCE: Heracles, identifiable by his lion-skin cloak, wields a club whilst attempting to collar a horse, identifiable as one of the mares of Diomedes by dismembered the head, shoulder, and arm of a man it is carrying in its mouth. A fragmentary vase by another Late Archaic Greek vase painter, Oltos, also shows Heracles wielding his club and grabbing a horse with severed human arm hanging from its jaws. A man, possibly Diomedes himself, is present on the other side of the vase, though Boardman finds the identification improbable.

=== First tradition: Heracles completes the labour alone ===
The earliest surviving account of the labour in which a narrative can be discerned is that of Pindar (c. 518 – c. 438 BCE). Preserved in the Oxyrhynchus Papyri, it is fragmentary in nature with many lacunae. The surviving details have Heracles entering Diomedes' palace at night and distracting the mares – chained by single bronze chain to a stone manger – by throwing a man, presumably a stablehand, into the manger. Whilst the mares are tearing their victim apart, Heracles is able to break the chain and drive them away. Further details indicated by the fragment, but which cannot be fully confirmed due to the lacunae, are that Diomedes probably died, perhaps defending his property, and that Heracles accomplished the task alone, leaving Iolaus in Thebes. The vases by Psiax and Oltos predate the account of Pindar, but the similarity between the three representations, particularly in the description of the body parts hanging from the horses mouths, suggest that they were all drawing on the same source for inspiration.

Diodorus Siculus (fl. 1st century BCE) is aware of a similar tradition to that recounted by Pindar, but states that it was Diomedes himself who Heracles fed to the horses. Pomponius Mela (late 1st century BCE– c. 45 CE) reports the same. The details of Diodorus' account relay that, because of their ferocity, the horses were tethered by iron chains to a bronze manger. Heracles threw Diomedes to the horses, who devoured their master and were then calm enough for Heracles to control. Heracles brought the horses to Eurystheus, who dedicated them to Hera. The descendants of the mares survived even to the time of Alexander the Great. It is implied in Diodorus' account that, after eating the man who had taught them to eat human flesh, the horses returned to a usual, non-carnivorous diet. Lactantius Placidus (c. 350–400 CE), a scholiast on Statius states in explicitly. Lactantius also reports that Heracles afterwards gave the horses to his son Chromis.

=== Second tradition: Heracles has assistance ===
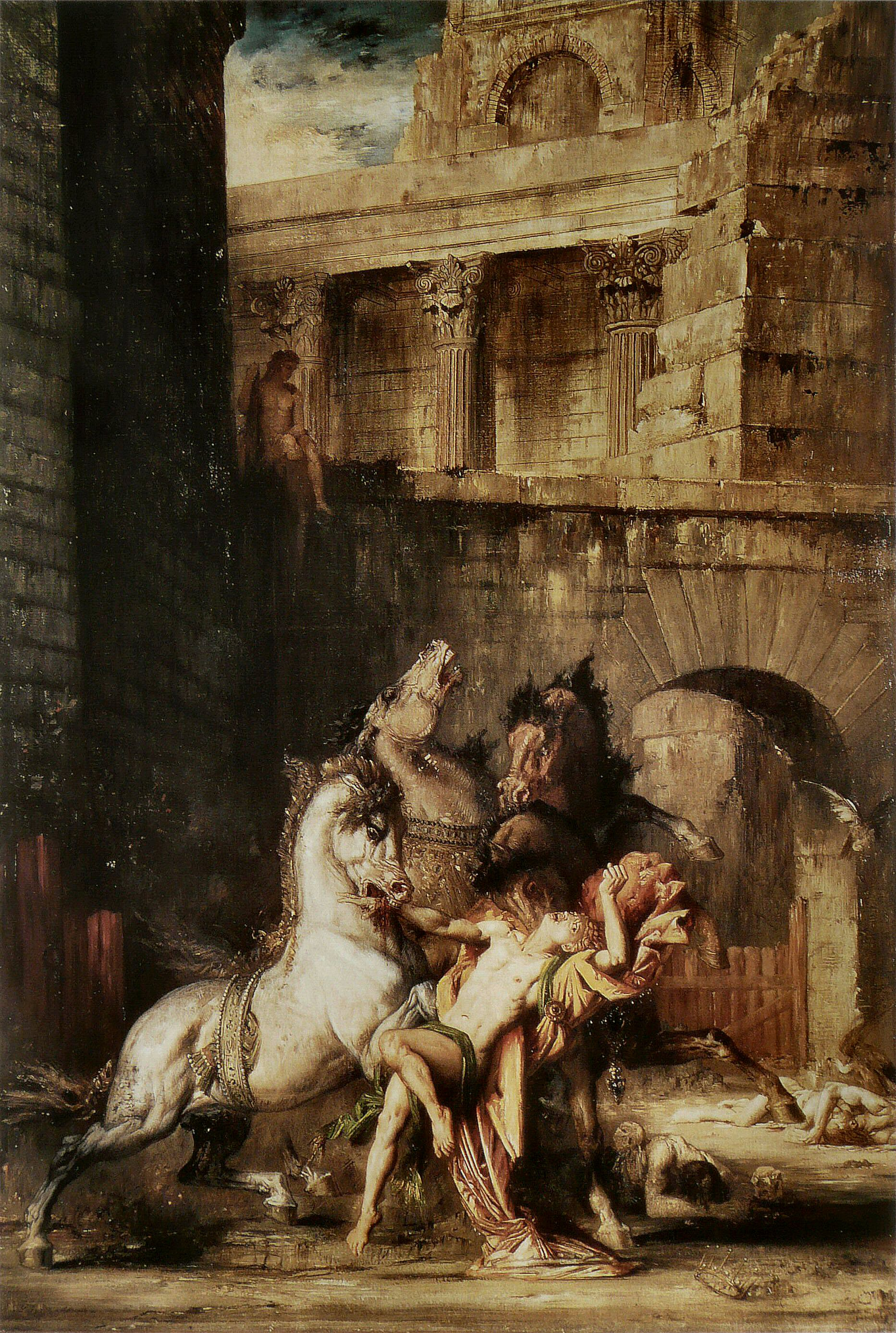
Diomedes Devoured by his Horses, by Gustave Moreau (1865), oil on canvas, 140 x 95.5 cm., Musée des Beaux-Arts de Rouen

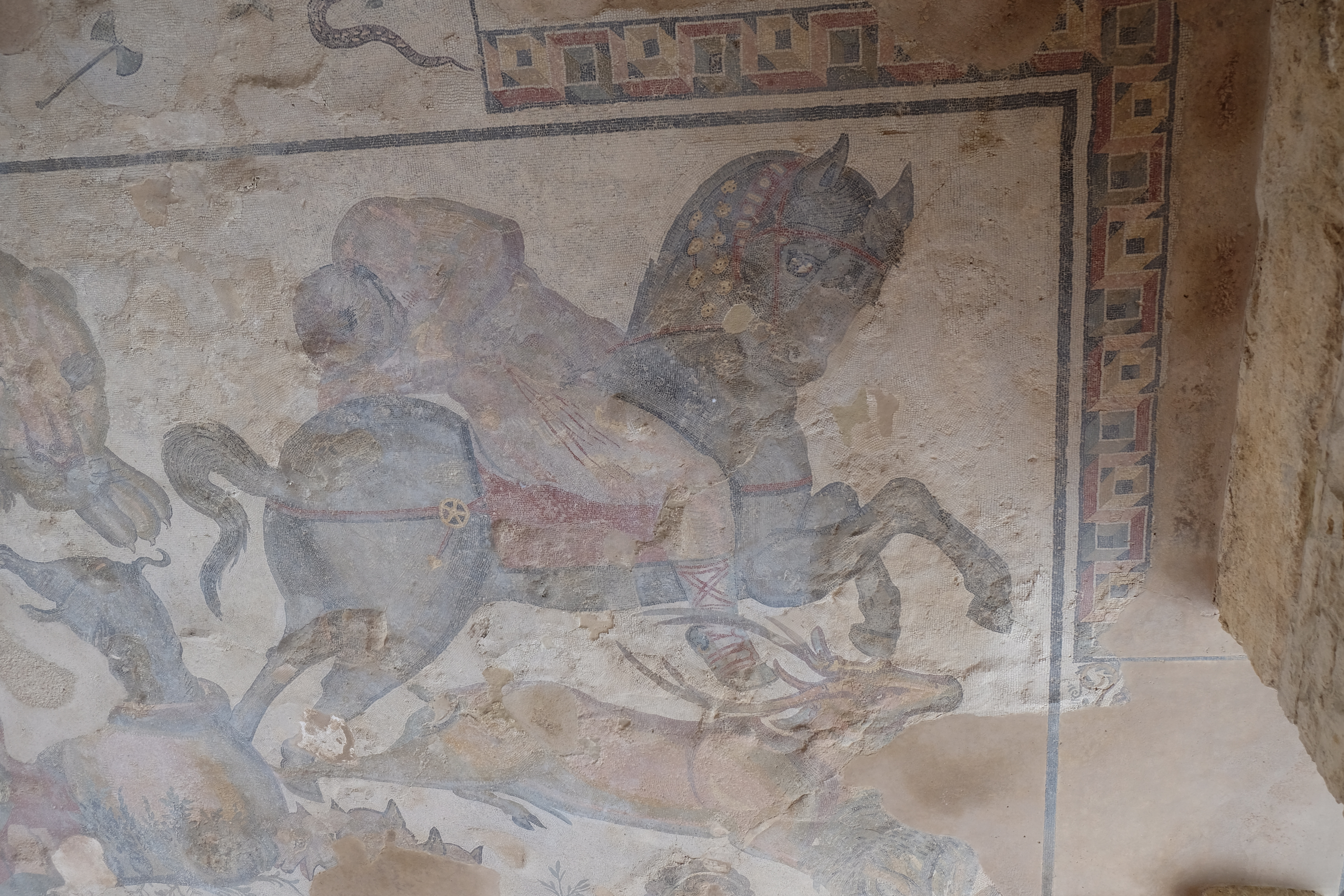
Details of the mosaic at the Villa Romana del Casale, showing one of the Bistones falling from his horse.

After Pindar, the next literary reference to the horses of Diomedes is found in a fragment of Hellanicus of Lesbos (c. 490 – c. 405 BCE), which states only that Abderus, a son of Hermes and lover of Heracles, was torn apart by the mares. Abderus is absent from the account of Diodorus but reappears in that of Apollodorus (1st or 2nd century CE), who probably used Hellanicus as his source. Apollodorus' account follows a different model in which Heracles brought a number of volunteers to help him capture the horses. After overpowering the grooms, Heracles broke the chains that tethered the horses and drove the mares down to sea. When Diomedes and his men, the Bistones, came to attempt to stop Heracles, Heracles left the mares in the care of Abderus, while he fought against Diomedes and his men. Heracles killed Diomedes, which caused the rest of the Bistones to flee. Abderus, however, lost control of his charges and was killed by the mares dragging him behind them. In his honour, Heracles founded the city of Abdera next to Abderus' tomb. Philostratus of Lemnos (c. 190–230 CE), who purports to be describing 'The Burial of Abderus' – a work of art he has seen in Naples, and the geographer Strabo (64 or 63 BCE–c. 24 CE) however, follow Hellanicus in recording that Abderus was devoured by the mares, as does a scholium on Clement of Alexandria's Protrepticus. Pseudo-Scymnus also reports Abderus' death at the mouths of the horses, but claims that Abderus himself founded the city of Abdera, and the incident with Diomedes came later. Apollodorus' account of the labour ends with Heracles bringing the horses to Eurystheus, who released them. The horses were then killed by wild animals on Mount Olympus.

The fight with the Bistones is represented on a large mosaic at the Villa Romana del Casale from the early fourth century CE, where, uniquely among representations of the Dodekathlos, this labour is the most prominent; the depiction takes up most of the central band, and also appears in the corners. The scene focuses on Heracles' engagement with Diomedes and the Bistonian horsemen. Diomedes, identifiable by his garb, is shown centrally, fallen from one of two riderless horses. Three other horses are also shown, with their riders pierced by arrows.

=== Later variants ===
In literary sources there is variant found in Ovid's Metamorphoses (43 BC – AD 17/18), in the Fabulae, and in the works of Quintus Smyrnaeus (latter 4th century CE), and by Helasius, in which Heracles kills both Diomedes and his horses.

In another tradition recorded by Probus, Sisyphus steals the horses after Heracles has given them to Eurystheus and gives them to his own son, Glaucus, who is subsequently himself eaten by the horses at the funeral games of Pelias when he fails to supply them with other humans to eat.

=== General iconography ===
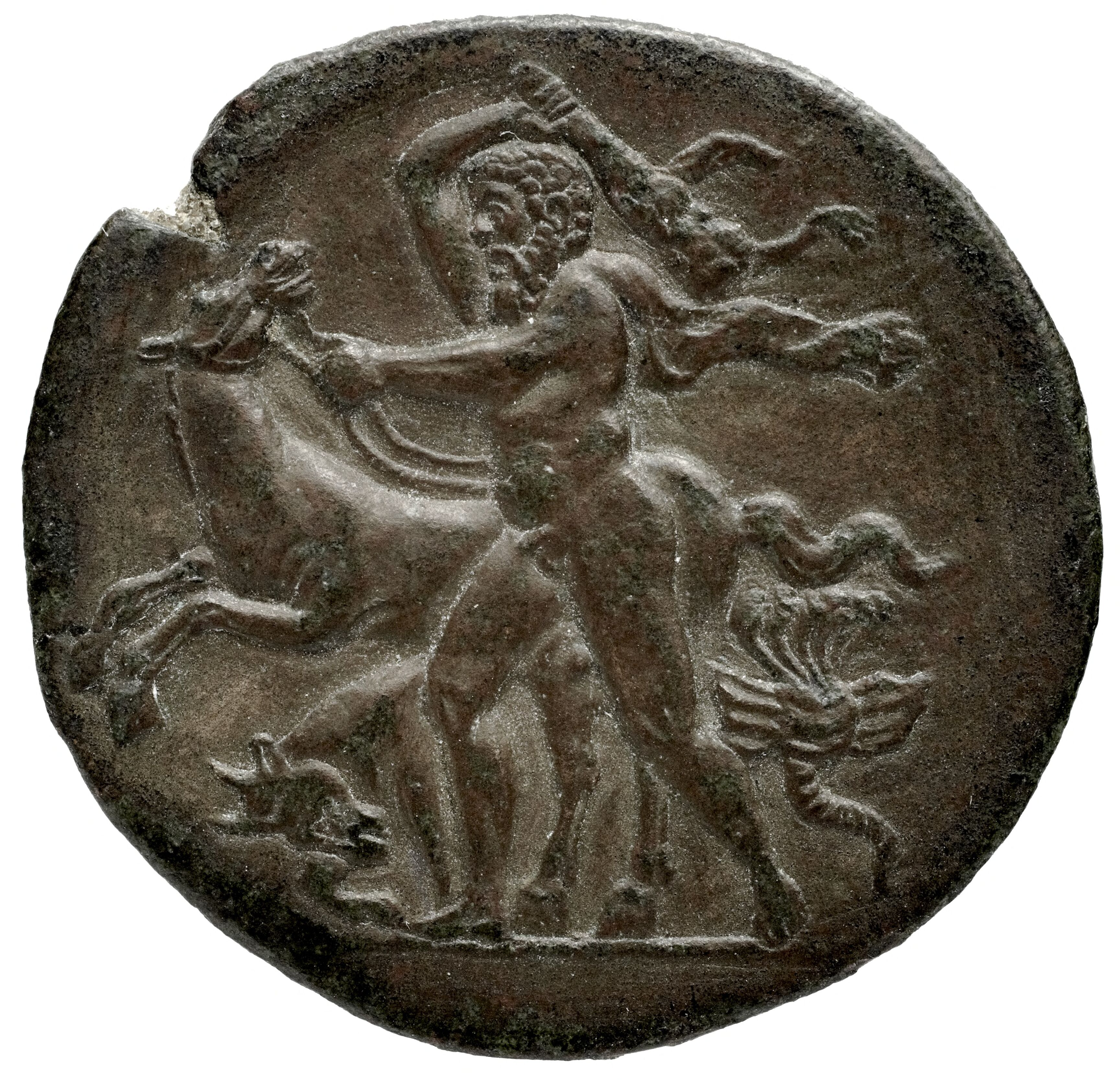
Bronze coin of the Roman Emperor Antoninus Pious (138–161 CE) from Alexandria, Egypt. Heracles is shown with two horses.

In the earlier surviving artistic representations of the myth in Greek art, Heracles is usually depicted with just one horse, standing by its side whilst grappling or holding it. Two to four horses begin to appear after around 400 BCE. Diomedes begins to appear as part of the depiction for certain late in the Hellenistic period. The depipctions of Heracles' handling of the horses is, Boardman suggests, heavily influenced by the representations of Heracles with the Cretan bull, the capture of which was Heracles' seventh labour, and a more popular subject in art.

In Roman art the scene was not particularly popular and mostly appears on sarcophagi that depict many of the labours together. Individual depictions of the scene appear mainly on intaglios and bronze provincial coins. From the Augustan period a new motif appears in art in which Herakles is depicted attacking the horses, one or more of which are on the ground.

== Rationalising interpretations ==
Some ancient authors attempted to rationalise myths and provide euhemeristic, metaphorical, or allegorical meanings for the Labours of Heracles.

The Paradoxographer Palaephatus (possibly late fourth century BCE) provides the following euhemeristic explanation of the myth:

They say that Diomedes’ horses ate men. Ridiculous! Horses enjoy barley and oats rather than human flesh. Here is the truth: men of long ago made their living with their own hands, and it was by tilling the ground that they acquired food and abundant resources. But a certain Diomedes became preoccupied with the breeding of horses. His delight in them reached the point that he lost his property: he sold everything he had and squandered it on the raising of his horses. So his friends called the horses "man-eaters" – and that is how the myth began.

Another paradoxographer, Heraclitus (late 1st or 2nd century CE) says that the mares of Diomedes were simply a roaming herd of wild horses that Heracles was able to harness.

Dio Chrysostom (c. 40 – c. 115 CE), a Greek orator and Cynic philosopher, presented the story in his oration On Virtue as Heracles punishing Diomedes because the latter treated his own citizens as well as strangers poorly, whilst living himself in luxury and revelry. The only mention of the horses is to say that Diomedes kept a large stable. Heracles kills Diomedes by hitting him with his club.
