= Bistones =

People of ancient Thrace

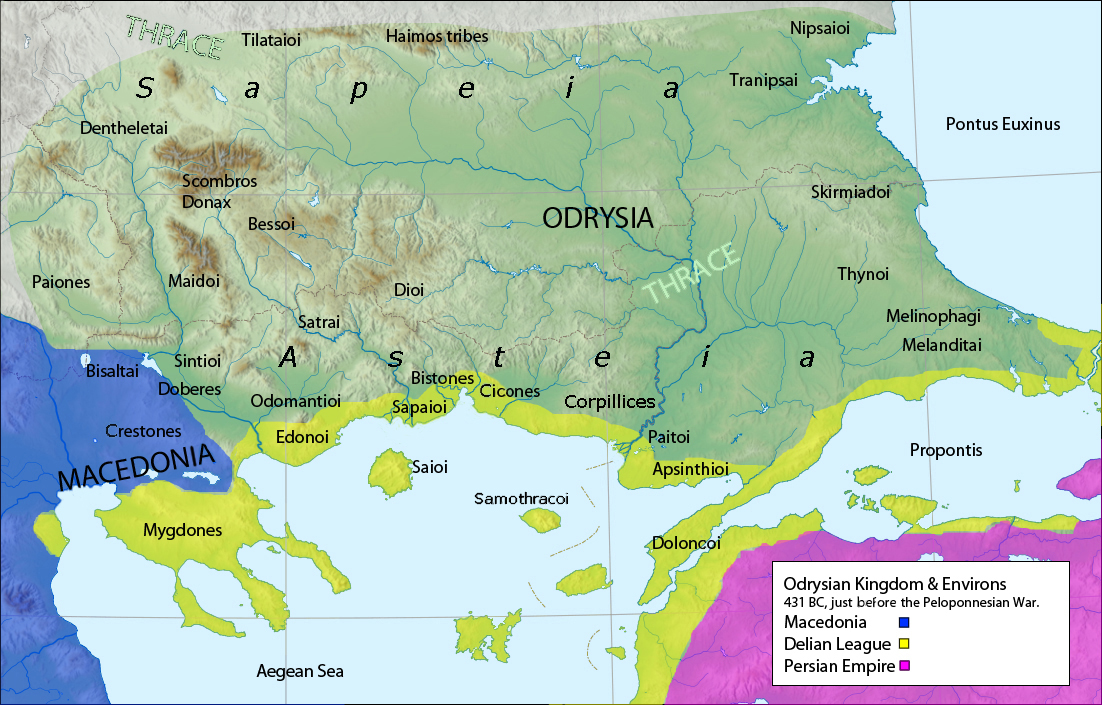
Approximate location of the Bistones

Bistones (Greek: "Βίστονες") is the name of a Thracian people who dwelt between Mount Rhodopé and the Aegean Sea, beside Lake Bistonis, near Abdera extending westward as far as the river Nestus. It was through the land of the Bistones that Xerxes marched on his invasion of Greece (480 BC). The Bistones continued to exist at the time when the Romans were masters of Thrace. Roman poets sometimes use the names of the Bistones for that of the Thracians in general. Pliny mentions one town as belonging to the Bistones: Tirida; the other towns on their coast, Dicaea, Ismaron, Parthenion, Phalesina and Maronea, were Greek colonies.

== Mythology ==
The Bistones were militant people who worshiped Ares, Dionysus or Bacchus, Minerva, and Bellona.

In the play Alcestis by Euripides, the mythical Heracles is on his way to the land of the Bistones in his labour for Tirynthian Eurystheus to fetch the chariot-steeds of Thracian Diomedes. The Thracian Diomedes was king of the Bistones.

The Argonautica (line 78) implies Orpheus is king of Bistonian Pieria, succeeding his mortal father, King Oeagrus. Orpheus is also said to have been killed by Bistonian women.

From the worship of Bacchus (Dionysus) in Thrace, Bacchic women are called Bistonides. Similarly, in some Latin poems, Edonis are Bacchic women from the Thracian tribe Edoni.

Some traditions state that Phineus was killed by Boreas, or that he was carried off by the Harpyes into the country of the Bistones or Milchessians.

According to another myth Biston founded the Bistones tribe.

== See also ==
- Biston
- List of Thracian tribes
