= Lake Vistonida =

Lake in Western Thrace, Greece

- Λίμνη Βιστωνίδα (Greek)
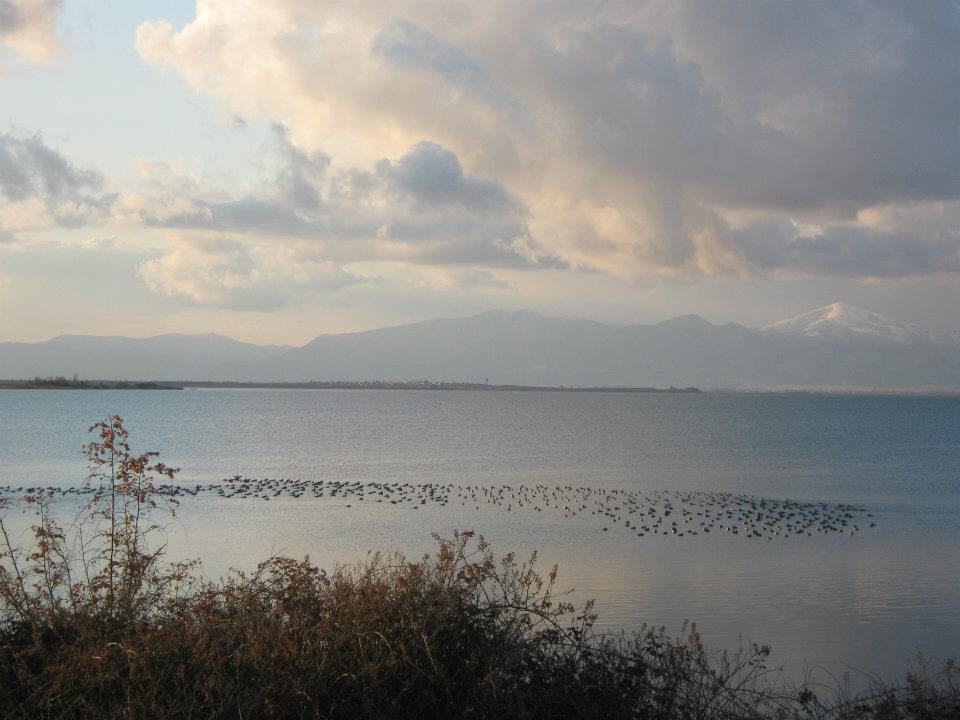
- Vistonida lake

- Location within Greece
- Location: Xanthi and Rhodope, Greece
- Coordinates: 41.04°N 25.11°E
- Type: lake
- Settlements: Porto Lagos

Lake Vistonida (Greek: Λίμνη Βιστωνίδα, older form: Βιστωνίς) is a lake in Western Thrace, Greece. Fed by the Kompsatos river, it encompasses a unique ecosystem and the local climate can be described as mid-Mediterranean. It hosts a variety of fauna, which comprise several types of fish, amphibians, reptiles, mammals, birds as well as flora.

== History ==
In antiquity, the lake was called "Bistonis" (Βιστονίς λίμνη), a great Thracian lake in the country of the Bistones, from whom it derived its name. The water of the lake was brackish and abounded in fish. In Byzantine times, a quarter of its produce is said to have been granted by the emperor Arcadius to the convent of the Vatopedi monastery on Mount Athos. The river Cossinites emptied itself into the lake Bistonis, which at one time overflowed the neighbouring country and swept away several Thracian towns."

== See also ==
- Bistonis, the nymph who lived in that lake with her people
- Bistoni, the Thracians who lived near the lake

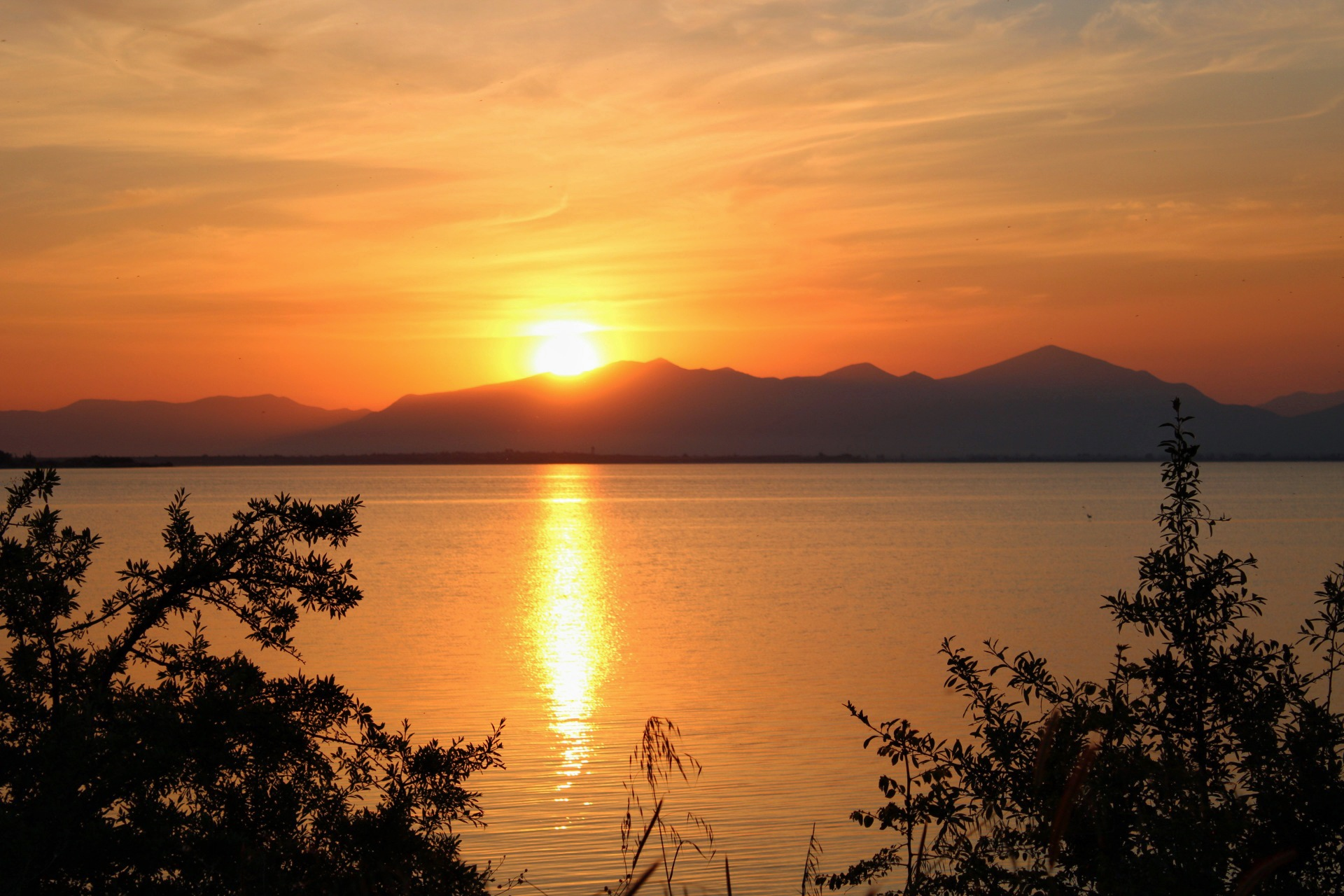
Sunset at the lake

== Bibliography ==
- "Lake Vistonida and Porto Lagos". Democritos University of Thrace. Archived from the original on 31 August 2009.
