= Thrace =

Geographical and historical region in Southeast Europe

Coordinates: 42°N 26°E

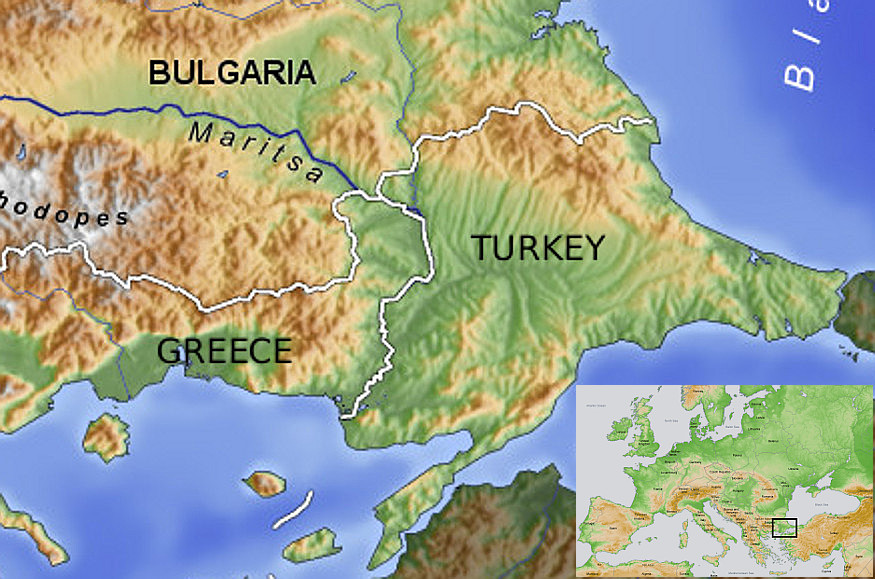
- The region of Thrace in the modern boundaries of Bulgaria, Greece, and Turkey
- Country: Bulgaria; Greece; Turkey

Thrace (/θreɪs/, thrayss) is a geographical and historical region in Southeast Europe roughly corresponding to the province of Thrace in the Roman Empire. Bounded by the Balkan Mountains to the north, the Aegean Sea to the south, and the Black Sea to the east, it comprises present-day southeastern Bulgaria, northeastern Greece, and the European part of Turkey, corresponding to Northern, Western and East Thrace respectively.

In classical antiquity, lands inhabited by ancient Thracians extended also in the north to modern-day Northern Bulgaria and Romania and to the west into Northern Greece, North Macedonia and Serbia.

== Etymology ==
The word Thrace, from ancient Greek Thrake (Θρᾴκη), referred originally to the Thracians (ancient Greek Thrâikes Θρᾷκες), an ancient people inhabiting Southeast Europe. The name Europe (ancient Greek Eurṓpē Εὐρώπη), also at first referred to this region, before that term expanded to include its modern sense.

Sixth century geographer Stephanus of Byzantium claimed that, long before the ancient Greeks started referring to the region as Thrace, it was known as Aria (Aría Ἀρία) and Perke (Pérkē Πέρκη).

In Turkish, Thrace is commonly referred to as Rumeli, meaning "Land of the Romans", which was the name traditionally used by the Ottomans for the Byzantine Empire and Orthodox Christians (Rum millet).

In Greek mythology, Thrace is named after the heroine and sorceress Thrace, who was the daughter of Oceanus and Parthenope, and sister of Europa.

== Geography ==
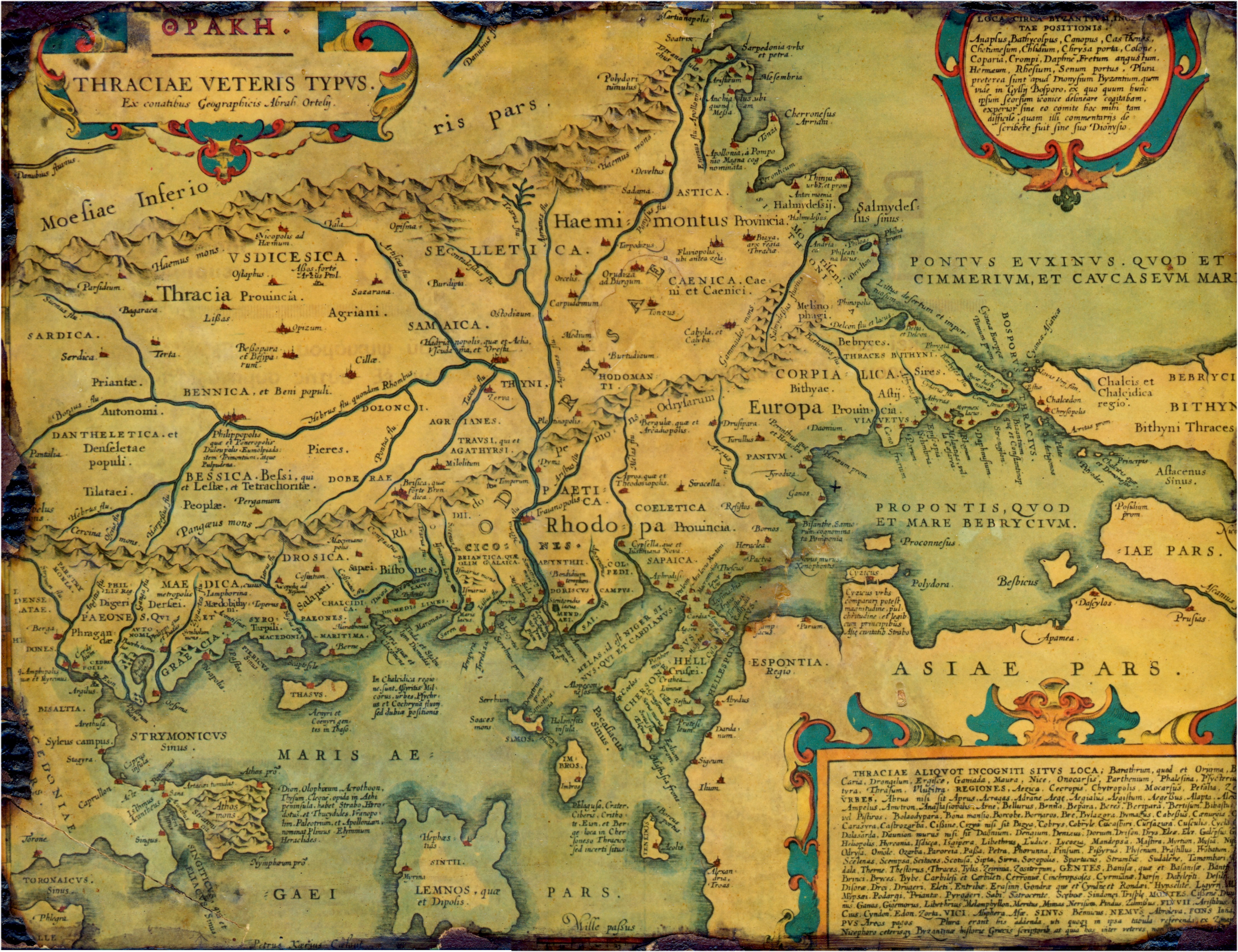
Map of Ancient Thrace made by Abraham Ortelius in 1585, stating both the names Thrace and Europe

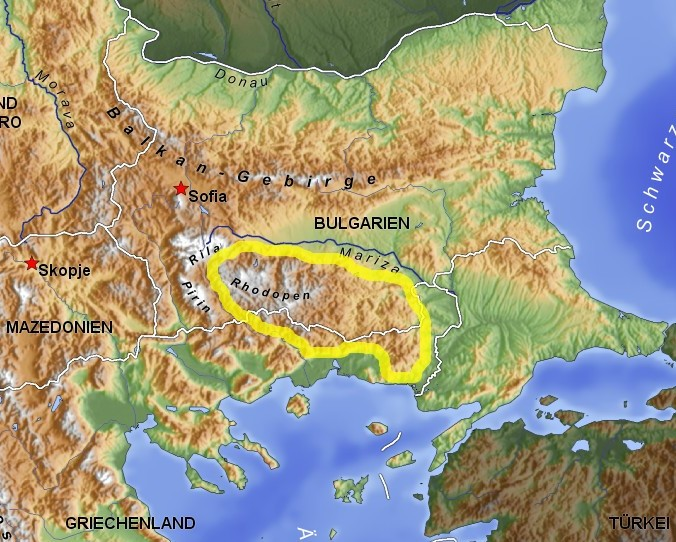
The physical–geographical boundaries of Thrace: the Balkan Mountains to the north, the Rhodope Mountains (highlighted) to the southwest, the Aegean Sea to the south, the Bosporus to the southeast and the Black Sea to the east

The historical boundaries of Thrace have varied. The ancient Greeks employed the term "Thrace" to refer to all of the territory which lay north of Thessaly inhabited by the Thracians, a region which "had no definite boundaries" and to which other regions (like Macedonia and even Scythia) were added. In one ancient Greek source, the very Earth is divided into "Asia, Libya, Europa and Thracia". As the Greeks gained knowledge of world geography, "Thrace" came to designate the area bordered by the Danube on the north, by the Euxine Sea (Black Sea) on the east, by northern Macedonia in the south, and by Illyria to the west. This largely coincided with the Thracian Odrysian kingdom, whose borders varied over time. After the Macedonian conquest, this region's former border with ancient Macedonia was shifted from the Struma River to the Mesta River. This usage lasted until the Roman conquest. Henceforth, (classical) Thrace referred only to the tract of land largely covering the same extent of space as the modern geographical region. In its early period, the Roman province of Thrace was of this extent, but after the administrative reforms of the late 3rd century, Thracia's much reduced territory became the six small provinces which constituted the Diocese of Thrace. The medieval Byzantine theme of Thrace at some point contained only part of what is today East Thrace. Maritsa river, also known as Evros, runs though Thrace and forms the modern border between Western and Eastern Thrace.

=== Cities ===
The largest cities of Thrace are:

- Istanbul
- Plovdiv
- Çorlu
- Tekirdağ
- Burgas
- Edirne
- Stara Zagora
- Sliven
- Yambol
- Haskovo
- Alexandroupoli
- Komotini
- Xanthi
- Kırklareli

=== Demographics and religion ===
Most of the Bulgarian and Greek population are Orthodox Christians, while most of the Turkish inhabitants of Thrace are Sunni Muslims. There are also communities of Muslim Pomaks and Romani.

In Summer 1934, up to 10,000 Jews were maltreated, bereaved, and then forced to quit the region (see 1934 Thrace pogroms). From Bulgaria and Romania between 1934 and 1938 a large wave of Muslim immigrants went to East Thrace.

== History ==
=== Mythology ===
Ancient Greek mythology provides the Thracians with a mythical ancestor Thrax, the son of the war-god Ares, who was said to reside in Thrace. The Thracians appear in Homer's Iliad as Trojan allies, led by Acamas and Peiros. Later in the Iliad, Rhesus, another Thracian king, makes an appearance. Cisseus, father-in-law to the Trojan elder Antenor, is also given as a Thracian king.

Homeric Thrace was vaguely defined, and stretched from the River Axios in the west to the Hellespont and Black Sea in the east. The Catalogue of Ships mentions three separate contingents from Thrace: Thracians led by Acamas and Peiros, from Aenus; Cicones led by Euphemus, from southern Thrace, near Ismaros; and from the city of Sestus, on the Thracian (northern) side of the Hellespont, which formed part of the contingent led by Asius. Ancient Thrace was home to numerous other tribes, such as the Edones, Bisaltae, Cicones, and Bistones in addition to the tribe that Homer specifically calls the "Thracians".

Greek mythology is replete with Thracian kings, including Diomedes, Tereus, Lycurgus, Phineus, Tegyrius, Eumolpus, Polymnestor, Poltys, and Oeagrus (father of Orpheus).

Thrace is mentioned in Ovid's Metamorphoses, in the episode of Philomela, Procne, and Tereus: Tereus, the King of Thrace, lusts after his sister-in-law, Philomela. He kidnaps her, holds her captive, rapes her, and cuts out her tongue. Philomela manages to get free, however. She and her sister, Procne, plot to get revenge, by killing her son Itys (by Tereus) and serving him to his father for dinner. At the end of the myth, all three turn into birds – Procne into a swallow, Philomela into a nightingale, and Tereus into a hoopoe.

The city of Dicaea in Thrace was named after the son of Poseidon, Dicaeus.

=== Classical period ===
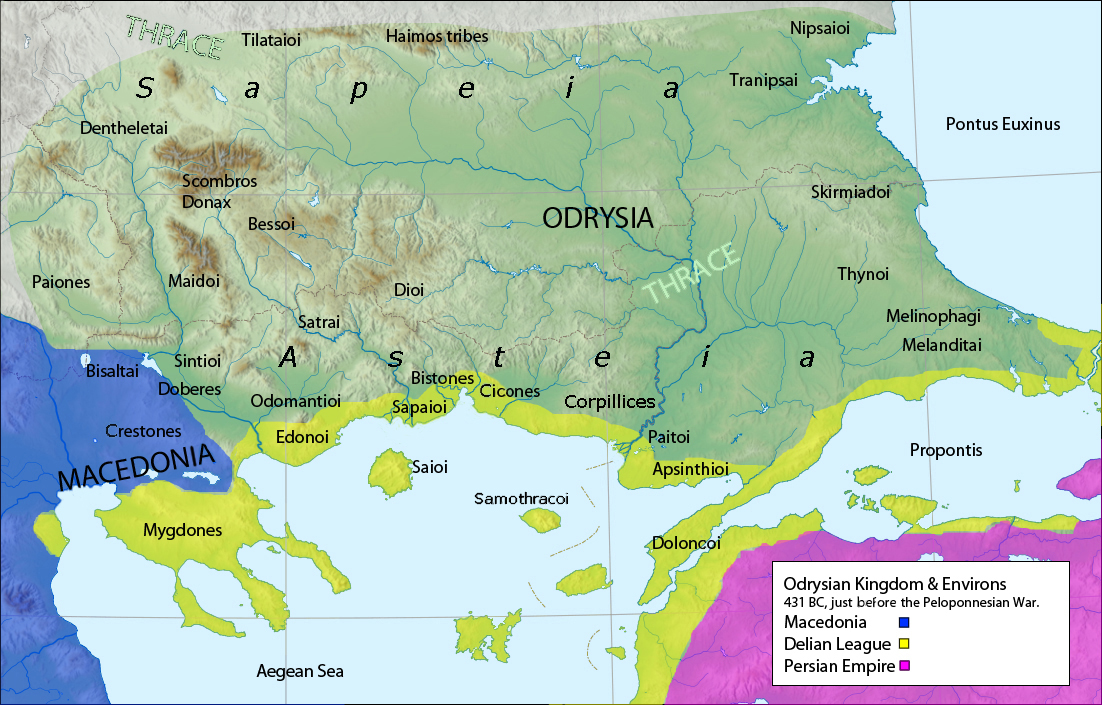
Thrace in the Odrysian Kingdom showing several Thracian tribes. Sapeia was Northern Thrace and Asteia was Southern Thrace

Thrace and the Thracian Odrysian Kingdom under Sitalces c. 431–424 BC, showing the territories of several Thracian tribes

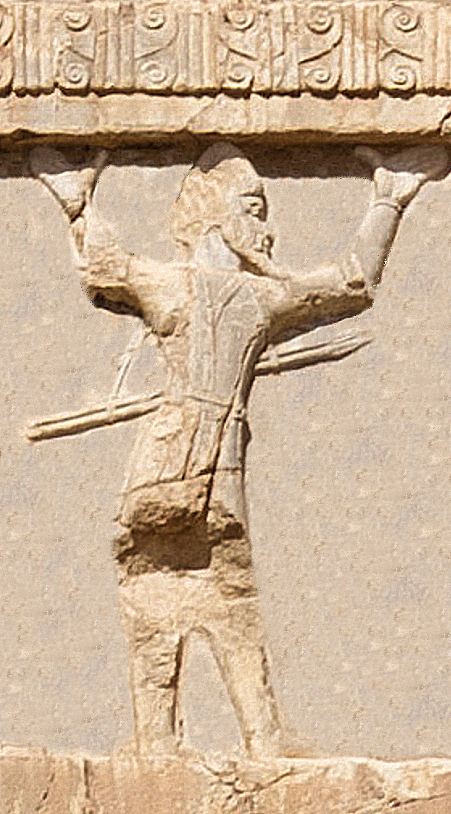
Skudrian (Thracian) soldier of the Achaemenid army, circa 480 BC. Xerxes I tomb relief.

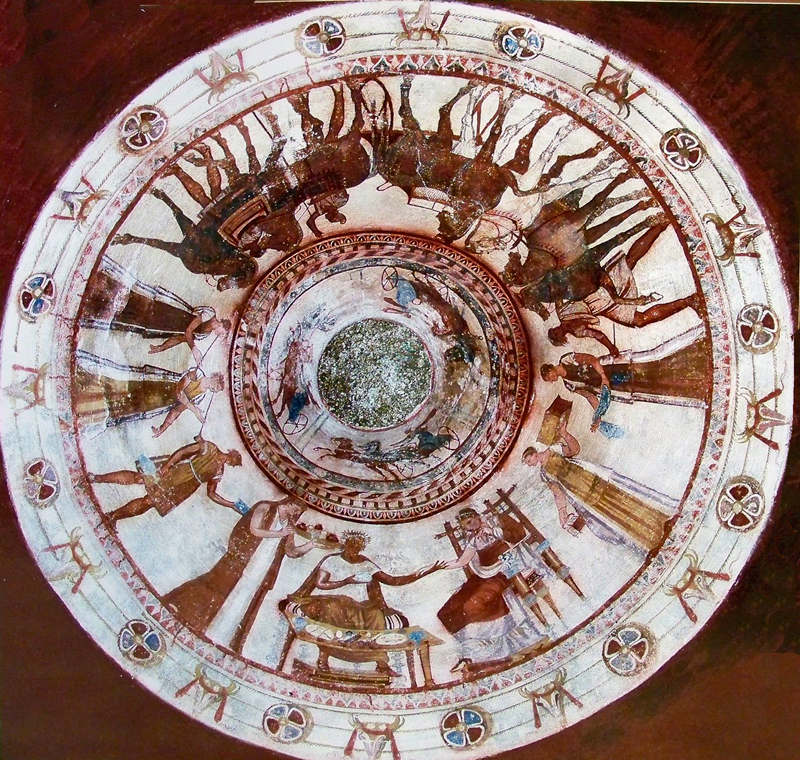
Thracian Tomb of Kazanlak.

Indigenous Thracians were divided into numerous tribes. The first Greek colonies in coastal Thrace were founded in the 8th century BC. The first to take greater control of Thrace, in part or whole, were the Achaemenid Persians in the late 6th century BC. The region was incorporated into their empire as the Satrapy of Skudra, after the Scythian campaign of Darius the Great. Thracian soldiers were used in Persian armies and are depicted in carvings of the Persepolis and Naqsh-e Rostam. Persians' presence in Thracia lasted up until the rise of the Delian League.

Thracians recorded no collective name for themselves; terms such as Thrace and Thracians were assigned by the Greeks. Divided into separate tribes, the Thracians did not form any lasting political organizations until the founding of the Odrysian state in the 4th century BC. Like Illyrians, the locally ruled Thracian tribes of the mountainous regions maintained a warrior tradition, while the tribes based in the plains were purportedly more peaceable. Recently discovered funeral mounds in Bulgaria suggest that Thracian kings did rule regions of Thrace with distinct Thracian national identity. During this period, a subculture of celibate ascetics called the Ctistae lived in Thrace, where they served as philosophers, priests, and prophets.

Sections of Thrace particularly in the south started to become hellenized before the Peloponnesian War as ancient Greek colonies were set up in coastal Thrace since the archaic period. The special interest of Athens to Thrace is underlined by the numerous finds of Athenian silverware in Thracian tombs.

In the 4th century BC most of Thrace was conquered by Philip II of Macedon and his son Alexander the Great. Notably, Thracian troops are known to have accompanied Alexander when he crossed the Hellespont to invade the Achaemenid Empire.

=== Hellenistic and Roman period ===
Alexander's empire was divided between his generals and Thrace passed to Lysimachus, who ruled as king up until his defeat from Seleucus I Nicator in 281 BC at the battle of Corupedium. In 171-168 BC, at the Third Macedonian War the Odryssian king Cotys IV allied to Perseus of Macedon and following the subjugation of Macedon to the Romans, Thrace became a tributary to Rome.

Towards the end of the 1st century BC Thrace lost its status as a client kingdom as the Romans began to directly appoint their kings. Probably soon after the Battle of Actium in 31 BC, Roman leader Augustus sought to implement indirect rule over Thrace through a large, Hellenized client kingdom. The Romans removed the Odrysian-Astaean royal family from power, and put the entire kingdom under Sapaean rule with Bizye acting as the initial centre of this reorganized polity. This situation lasted until 46 AD, when the Romans finally turned Thrace into a Roman province (Romana provincia Thracia).

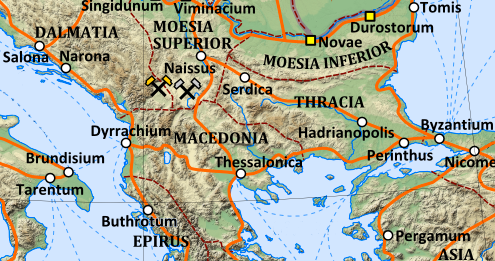
The Roman province of Thrace c. 200 AD

During the Roman domination, within the geographical borders of ancient Thrace, there were two separate Roman provinces, namely Thrace ("provincia Thracia") and Lower Moesia ("Moesia inferior"). Later, in the times of Diocletian, the two provinces were joined and formed the so-called "Dioecesis Thracia". The establishment of Roman colonies and mostly several Greek cities, as was Nicopolis, Topeiros, Traianoupolis, Plotinoupolis, and Hadrianoupolis resulted from the Roman Empire's urbanization. The Roman provincial policy in Thrace favoured mainly not the Romanization but the Hellenization of the country, which had started as early as the Archaic period through the Greek colonisation and was completed by the end of Roman antiquity. As regards the competition between the Greek and Latin language, the very high rate of Greek inscriptions in Thrace extending south of Haemus Mountains proves the complete language Hellenization of this region. The boundaries between the Greek and Latin speaking Thrace are placed just above the northern foothills of Haemus Mountains.

During the imperial period many Thracians – particularly members of the local aristocracy of the cities – had been granted the right of the Roman citizenship (civitas Romana) with all its privileges. Epigraphic evidence show a large increase in such naturalizations in the times of Trajan and Hadrian, while in 212 AD the well-known decree of emperor Caracalla (constitutio Antoniniana), granted Roman citizenship to all the free inhabitants of the Roman Empire. During the same period (in the 1st–2nd century AD), a remarkable presence of Thracians is testified by the inscriptions outside the borders (extra fines) both in the Greek territory and in all the Roman provinces, especially in the provinces of Eastern Roman Empire.

The Byzantine thema of Thrace

=== Byzantine and Bulgarian empires ===
By the mid-5th century, as the Western Roman Empire began to crumble, Thracia fell from the authority of Rome and into the hands of Germanic tribal rulers. With the fall of the Western Roman Empire, Thracia turned into a battleground territory for the better part of the next 1,000 years. The surviving eastern portion of the Roman Empire, later known as the Byzantine Empire, with Constantinople as its capital, retained control over Thrace until the 7th century when the northern half of the entire region was incorporated into the First Bulgarian Empire and the remainder was reorganized in the Thracian and Macedonian themes. The Empire regained the lost regions in the late 10th century until the Bulgarians regained control of the northern half at the end of the 12th century. Throughout the 13th century and the first half of the 14th century, the region was changing in the hands of the Bulgarian and the Byzantine Empire (excluding Constantinople). In 1265, the area suffered a Mongol raid from the Golden Horde, led by Nogai Khan, and between 1305 and 1307 the area was raided by the Catalan company.

=== Ottoman empire ===
In 1352, the Ottoman Turks conducted their first incursion into the region and in 1354 conquered Gallipoli. They moved their capital to Edirne up until conquering the whole region with the fall of Constantinople in 1453, which then became the capital of the Ottoman empire.

Flag of Greek rebels in Thrace during the Greek War of Independence.

Several parts of Thrace, such as Lavara, Maroneia, Sozopolis, Aenos, Callipolis, and Samothraki rebelled during the Greek War of Independence.

Proposal to cede East Thrace to Greece during World War I. This photocopy came from a larger colour map.

== Modern borders ==
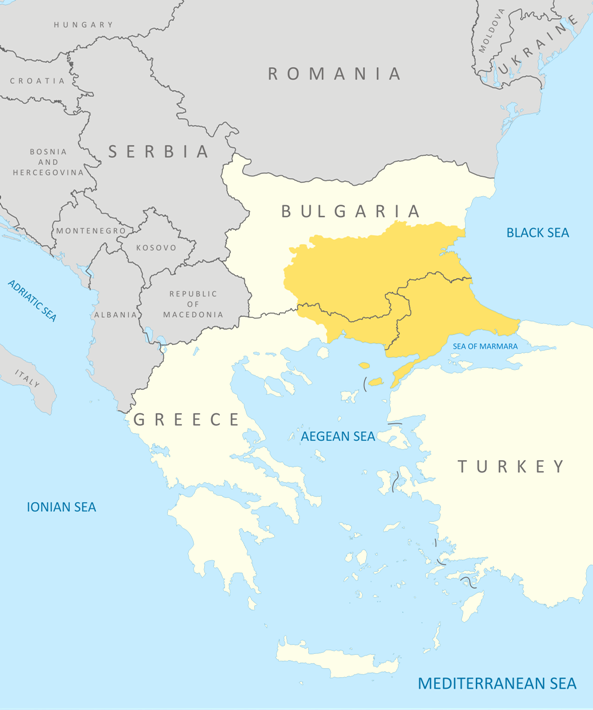
Thrace in the modern boundaries of Bulgaria, Greece, and Turkey

With the Congress of Berlin in 1878, Northern Thrace was incorporated into the semi-autonomous Ottoman province of Eastern Rumelia, which united with Bulgaria in 1885. Southern Thrace was divided among Turkey (eastern) and Greece (western) at the beginning of the 20th century, in the aftermath of World War I and the Greco-Turkish War. Today, Thracian is a geographical term used in Bulgaria, Turkey, and Greece.

== Notable people ==
- Orpheus was, in Ancient Greek mythology, the chief representative of the art of song and playing the lyre.
- Protagoras (c. 490–420 BC) was a Greek philosopher from Abdera, Thrace. An expert in rhetorics and subjects connected to virtue and political life, often regarded as the first sophist. He is known primarily for three claims: (1) that man is the measure of all things, often interpreted as a sort of moral relativism, (2) that he could make the "worse (or weaker) argument appear the better (or stronger)" (see Sophism), and (3) that one could not tell if the gods existed or not (see Agnosticism).
- Herodicus was a Greek physician of the fifth century BC who is considered the founder of sports medicine. He is believed to have been one of Hippocrates's tutors.
- Democritus (c. 460–370 BC) was a Greek philosopher and mathematician from Abdera, Thrace. His main contribution is the atomic theory, the belief that all matter is made up of various imperishable indivisible elements which he called atoms.
- Eumenes was a Greek general, satrap, and Successor of Alexander the Great.
- Spartacus was a Thracian who led a large slave uprising in what is now Italy in 73–71 BC. His army of escaped gladiators and slaves defeated several Roman legions in what is known as the Third Servile War.
- A number of Roman emperors of the 3rd–5th century were of Thraco-Roman backgrounds (Maximinus Thrax, Licinius, Galerius, Aureolus, Leo the Thracian, etc.). These emperors were elevated via a military career (hence the resultant nickname for them, Barracks Emperor), from the condition of common soldiers in one of the Roman legions to the foremost positions of political power.
- A number of Byzantine emperors, like Basil I, the founder of the Macedonian dynasty, John III Doukas Vatatzes and John V Palaiologos were born in Byzantine Thrace. Also Manuel Erotikos Komnenos, who was the first fully documented ancestor of the Komnenos dynasty.

== See also ==
- Trakiya Heights
- 1989 expulsion of Turks from Bulgaria
- Expulsion of Greeks from Istanbul
- Destruction of Thracian Bulgarians in 1913
- Provisional Government of Western Thrace
- Celtic settlement of Eastern Europe
- Dacia
- Paionia
- Dardania
- Moesia
- Hawks of Thrace
- Moesogoths
- Music of Thrace
- Thracian treasure
- List of kings of Thrace and Dacia
