= P. monstrosus =

P. monstrosus may refer to:

- Paraharmochirus monstrosus, a jumping spider species
- Poltys monstrosus, an orb-weaverspider species in the genus Poltys

== See also ==
- Monstrosus (disambiguation)
