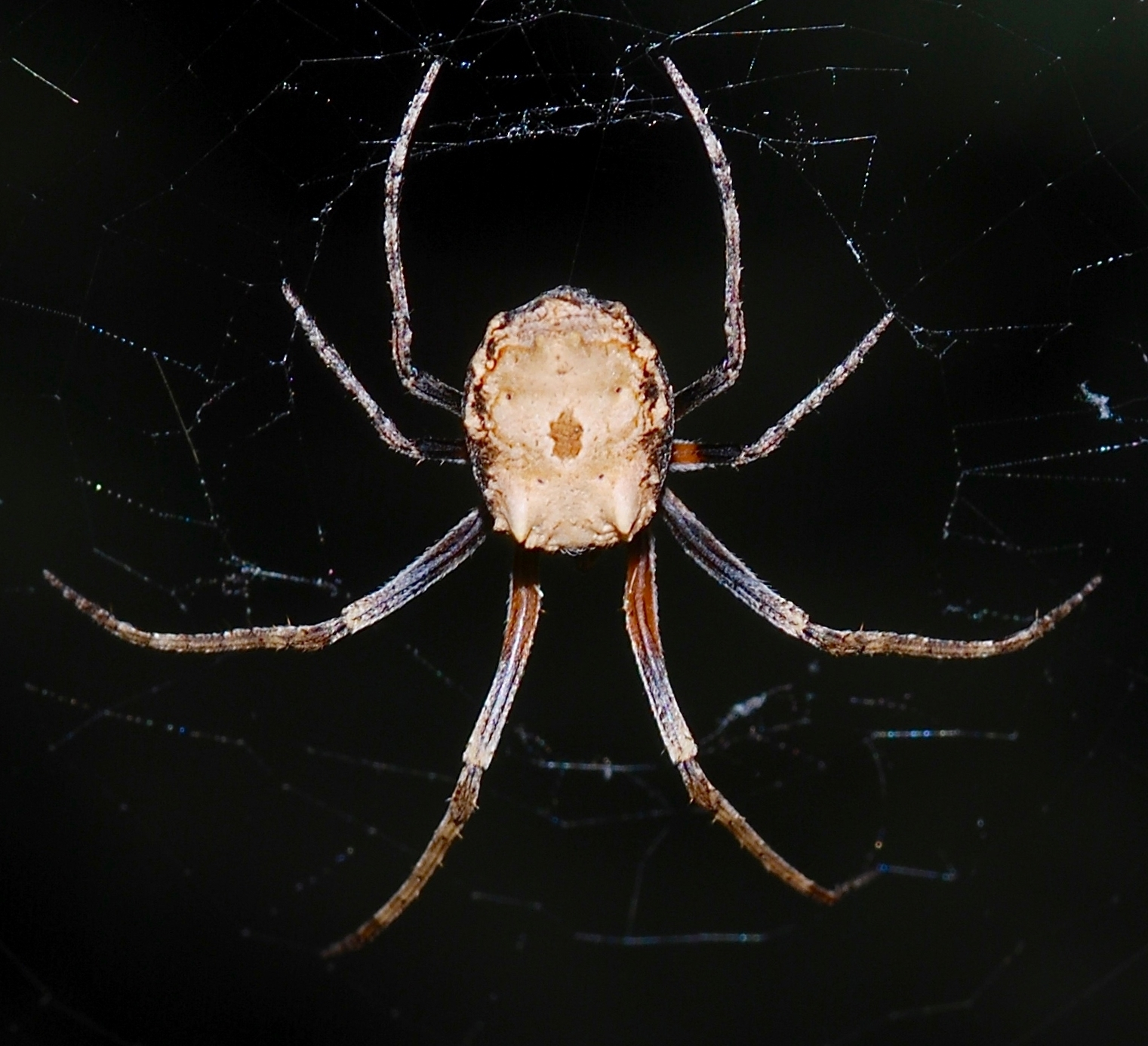
- Female in web
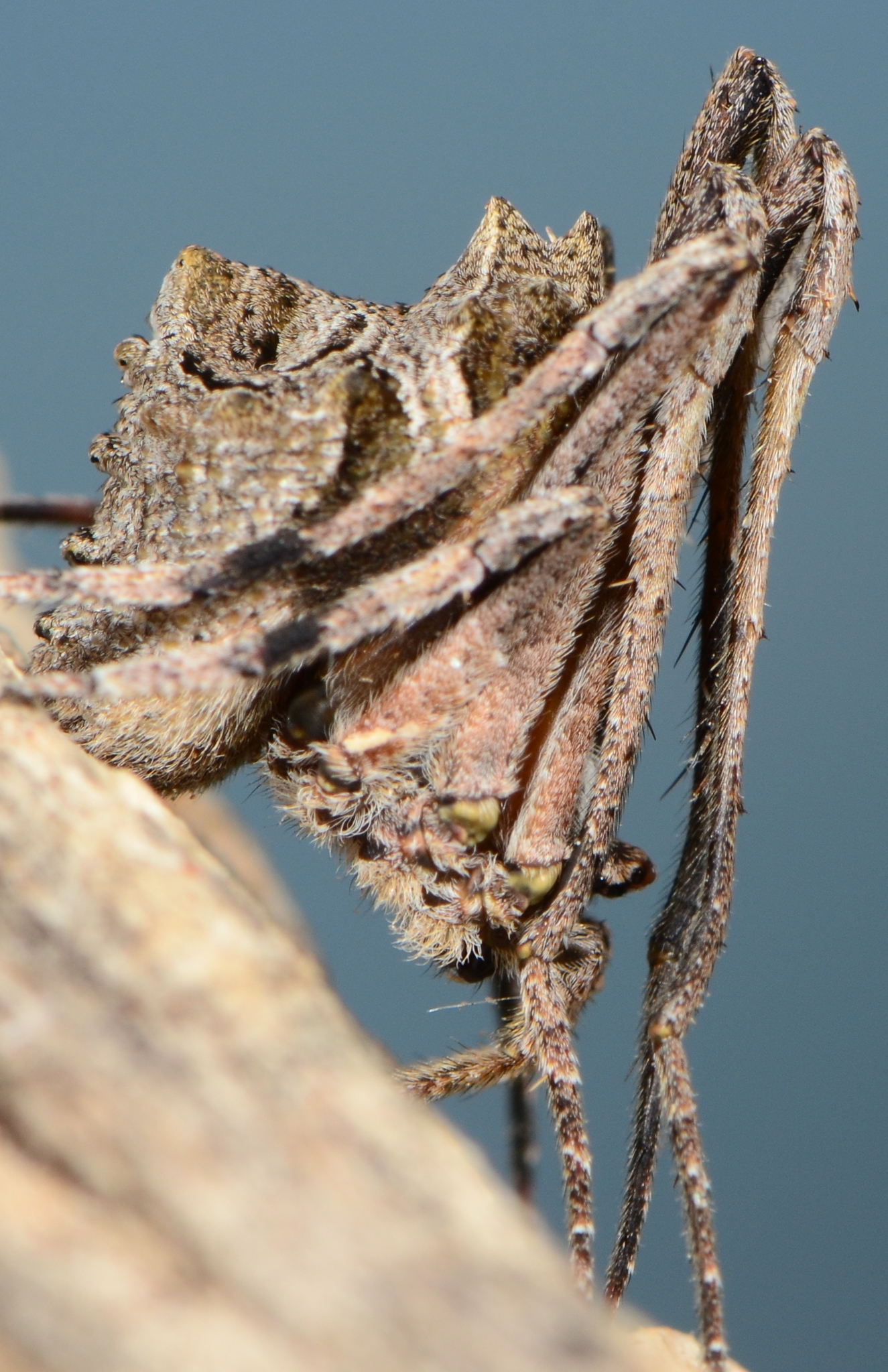
- Adult female

Scientific classification
- Kingdom: Animalia
- Phylum: Arthropoda
- Subphylum: Chelicerata
- Class: Arachnida
- Order: Araneae
- Infraorder: Araneomorphae
- Family: Araneidae
- Genus: Cyphalonotus
- Species: C. larvatus

Binomial name
- Cyphalonotus larvatus (Simon, 1881)

Synonyms
- Poltys larvata Simon, 1881

= Cyphalonotus larvatus =

Larvatus Twig Spider

Species of spider

Cyphalonotus larvatus is a species of spider in the family Araneidae. It is widespread throughout Africa and Zanzibar, and is commonly known as the larvatus twig spider.

== Distribution ==
Cyphalonotus larvatus has a wide distribution through Africa. In South Africa, the species is known from seven provinces at altitudes ranging from 4 to 1618 m above sea level.

== Habitat and ecology ==
The species inhabits multiple biomes including Grassland, Forest and Savanna biomes. After dark they weave a large orb web. The spider hangs in the centre with the legs spread out. When disturbed the legs are pulled together. The web is taken down in day time when the spider rests on bark with the legs sticking up in the air and arranged around the body. The species has been sampled from crops such as avocado, citrus and macadamia orchards.

== Description ==
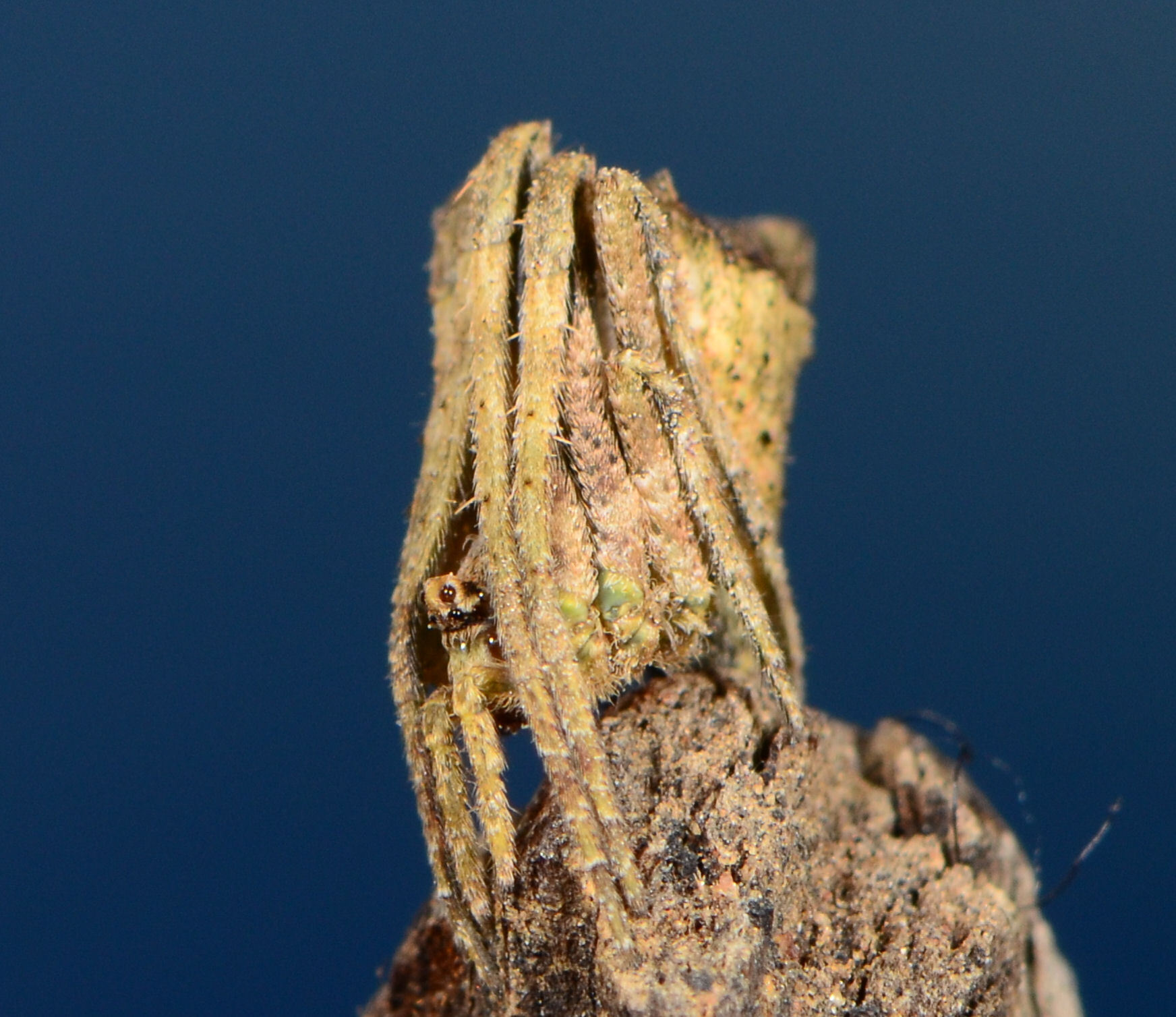

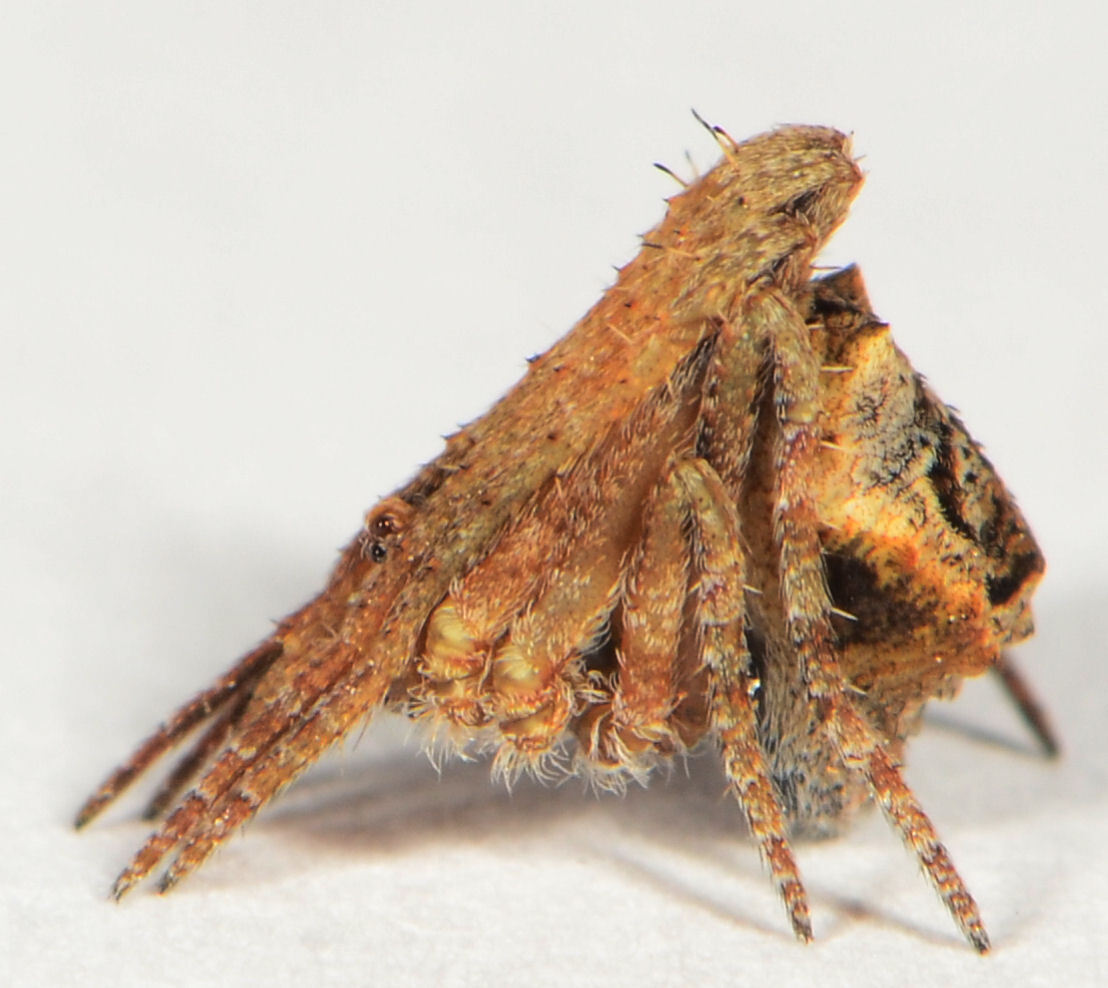

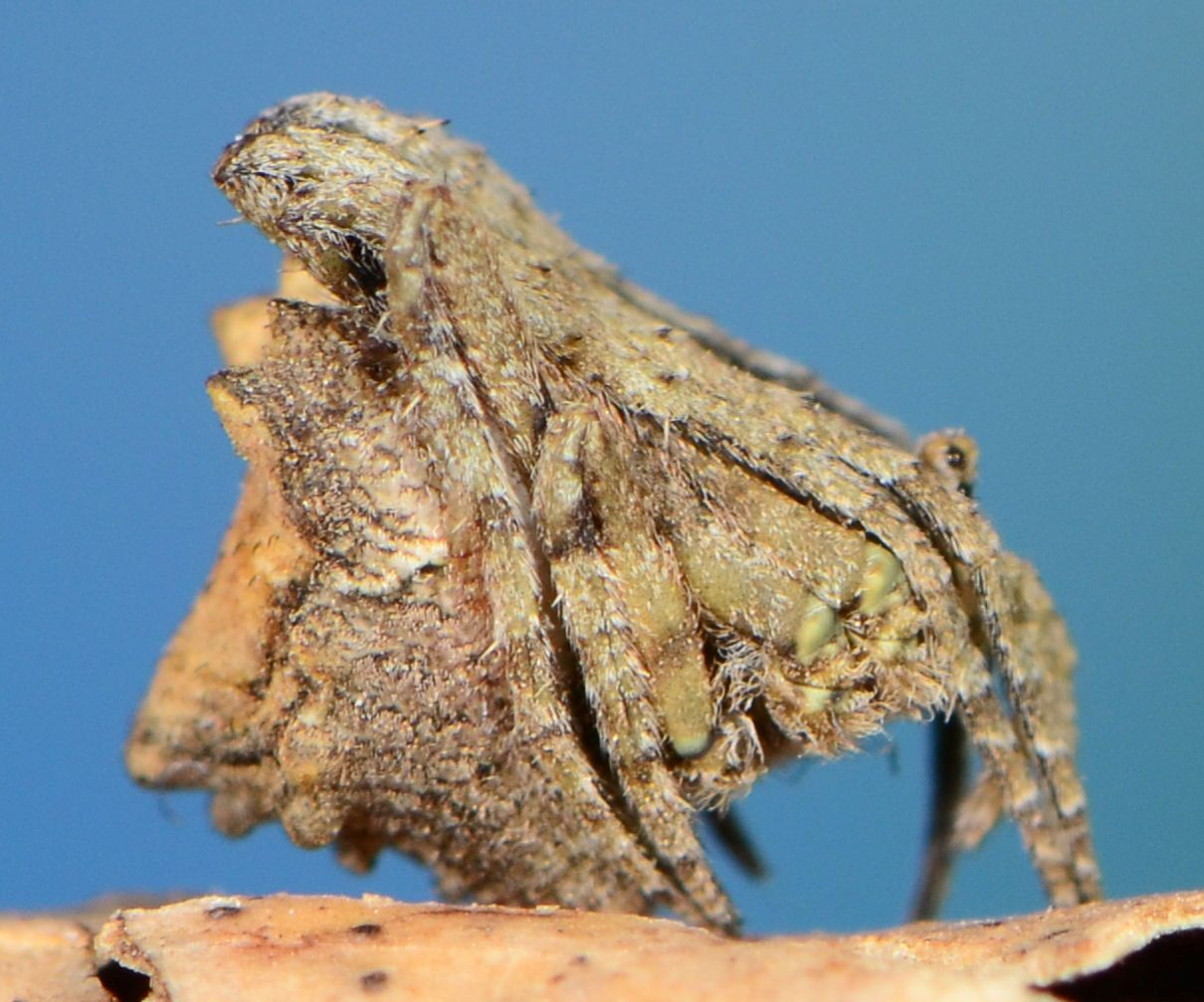

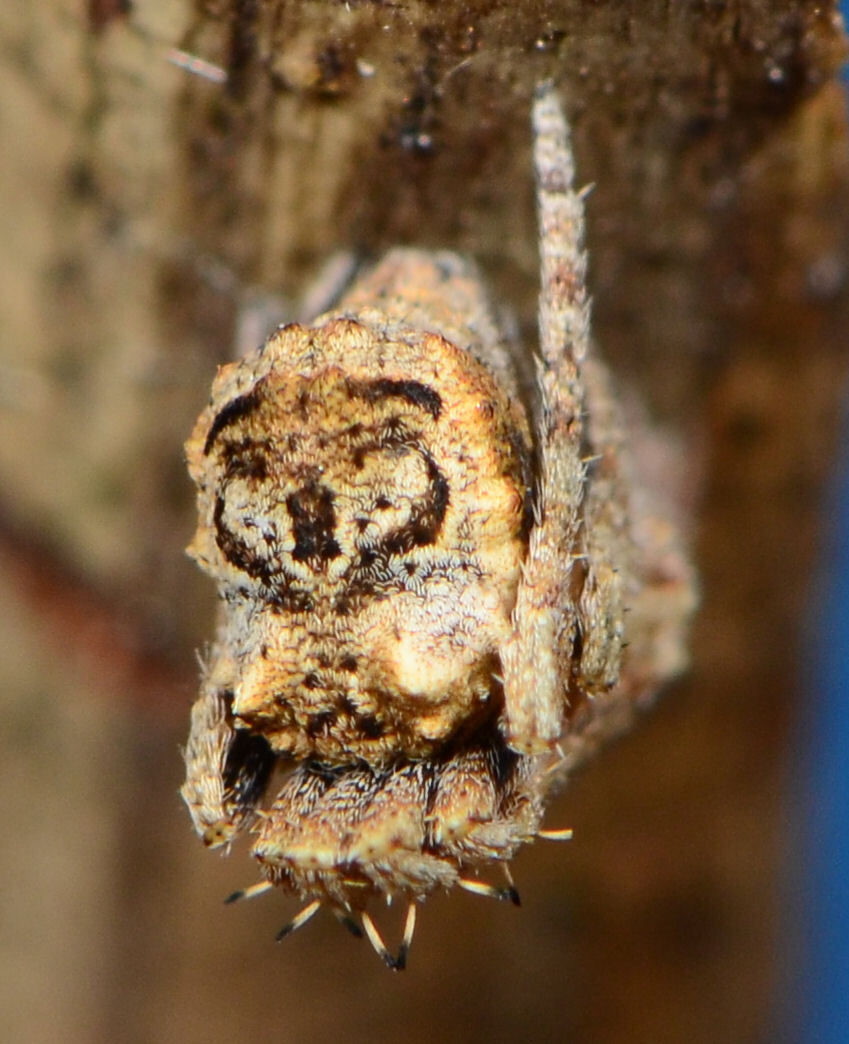

== Conservation ==
Cyphalonotus larvatus is listed as Least Concern by the South African National Biodiversity Institute due to its wide geographical range. The species is protected in more than 23 protected areas including Addo Elephant National Park, Ophathe Game Reserve, Tembe Elephant Park and Nylsvley Nature Reserve.

== Taxonomy ==
The species was originally described by Eugène Simon in 1881 from Zanzibar as Poltys larvata. It was later transferred to the genus Cyphalonotus. The species has not been revised and is known from both sexes.
