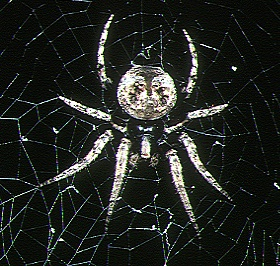
- female from Okinawa

Scientific classification
- Kingdom: Animalia
- Phylum: Arthropoda
- Subphylum: Chelicerata
- Class: Arachnida
- Order: Araneae
- Infraorder: Araneomorphae
- Family: Araneidae
- Genus: Poltys
- Species: P. illepidus

Binomial name
- Poltys illepidus C. L. Koch, 1843

Synonyms
- Poltys coronatus Keyserling, 1886; Poltys keyserlingi Keyserling, 1886; Poltys multituberculatus Rainbow, 1898; Poltys penicillatus Rainbow, 1920

= Poltys illepidus =

Species of spider

Poltys illepidus is a species of spider in the family Araneidae. It was first described by C. L. Koch in 1843. The species is distributed across northern Australia, Papua New Guinea, and Southeast Asia, extending north to Thailand and Japan.

== Etymology ==
The specific name illepidus is derived from Latin, meaning "unpolished" or "rough", likely referring to the spider's textured appearance and camouflage adaptations.

== Description ==
P. illepidus exhibits significant sexual dimorphism, with females considerably larger than males.

=== Females ===
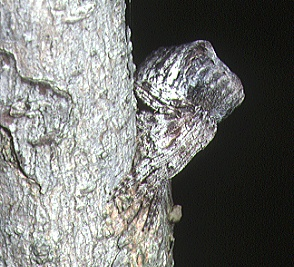
females from Okinawa

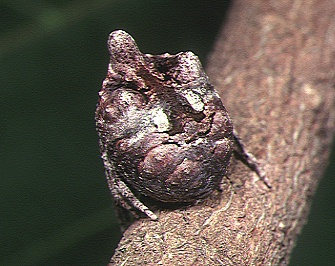

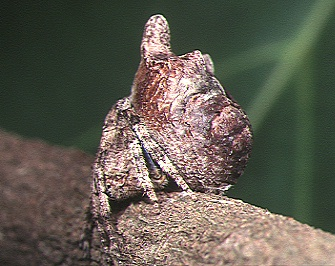

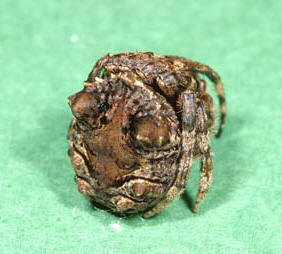

Adult females have a carapace length ranging from 4.17 to 8.75 mm. The carapace is broad, low, and darkly coloured, with a distinctive dome-like shape. The abdomen is relatively broad and rounded, with well-developed tubercles that aid in camouflage. The front femora show little to no broadening compared to other Poltys species.

The epigyne is fan-shaped and distinctive, being widest at approximately half its length. The epigynal foveae form narrow to medium-width grooves that are partly covered basally and separated by a strong median ridge.

Females display rich colouration in life, with the carapace mostly dark brown featuring reddish markings, while the abdomen shows a complex pattern of browns, yellows, oranges, and black, often accentuated by tufts of coloured setae.

=== Males ===
Males are much smaller, with carapace lengths ranging from 1.00 to 1.27 mm. They have a poorly defined, broad eye tubercle and relatively short legs. The palpal organ features a stout, sharply curved embolus and a distinctive terminal apophysis.

Males often display flattened, leaf-like macrosetae on the distal patellae and tibiae of the front legs, particularly in northern populations. Their colouration is generally more subdued than females, with olive-grey tones and dark markings.

== Distribution ==
P. illepidus is found across northern Australia, Papua New Guinea, and Southeast Asia, with confirmed records extending north to Thailand. In Australia, it occurs across Queensland, the Northern Territory, and Western Australia. The species has also been recorded from Norfolk Island and historically from Lord Howe Island, though current populations on the latter are uncertain.

Records from Sri Lanka, India, the Philippines, and Japan require verification through examination of male specimens, as females from these regions show consistent morphological differences from the accepted range of variation.

== Habitat and behaviour ==
P. illepidus constructs nocturnal orb webs measuring 30-40 cm in diameter between trees or low vegetation. The webs are typically built in spaces up to 4 meters wide and feature a strong golden-coloured bridge thread that remains in place during the day, while the main web structure is usually dismantled at dawn.

During daylight hours, the spiders employ remarkable camouflage strategies. Smaller individuals and males typically mimic dead twigs, while larger juveniles and adult females position themselves on tree trunks or in low vegetation, often resembling bark, knobs, or galls. Some individuals have been observed hiding in curled leaves, dead flower heads, or low herbage.

The species shows notable maternal care, with females producing fluffy yellow silk egg sacs that are sometimes placed in rolled leaves at the end of spanning web lines.

== Variation ==
The species exhibits considerable morphological variation across its range. Northern and western Australian populations consistently display flattened macrosetae on juvenile and male specimens, while this feature becomes progressively less common in populations further south and east. Genetic analysis of the COI gene reveals consistent differentiation between northern and southern Australian populations, though morphological differences remain subtle.

== Taxonomy ==
P. illepidus serves as the type species for the genus Poltys. Several species have been synonymized with P. illepidus, including P. coronatus Keyserling, 1886, P. keyserlingi Keyserling, 1886, P. multituberculatus Rainbow, 1898, and P. penicillatus Rainbow, 1920.

The holotype female was described from "East India, Singapore, Bintang" but has not been located in recent taxonomic reviews.
