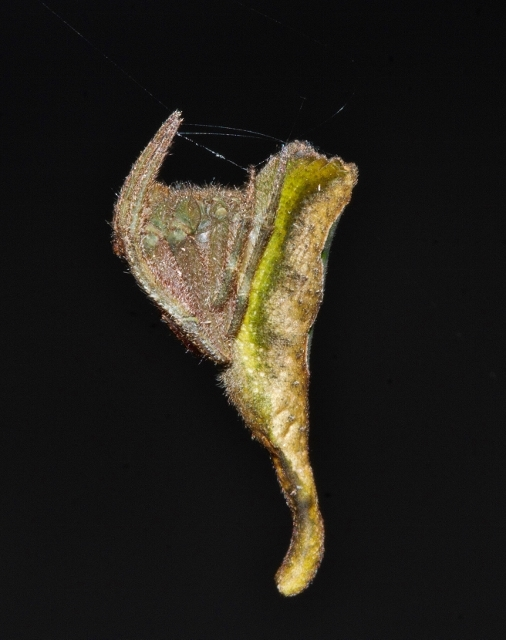
- P. furcifer in Mozambique
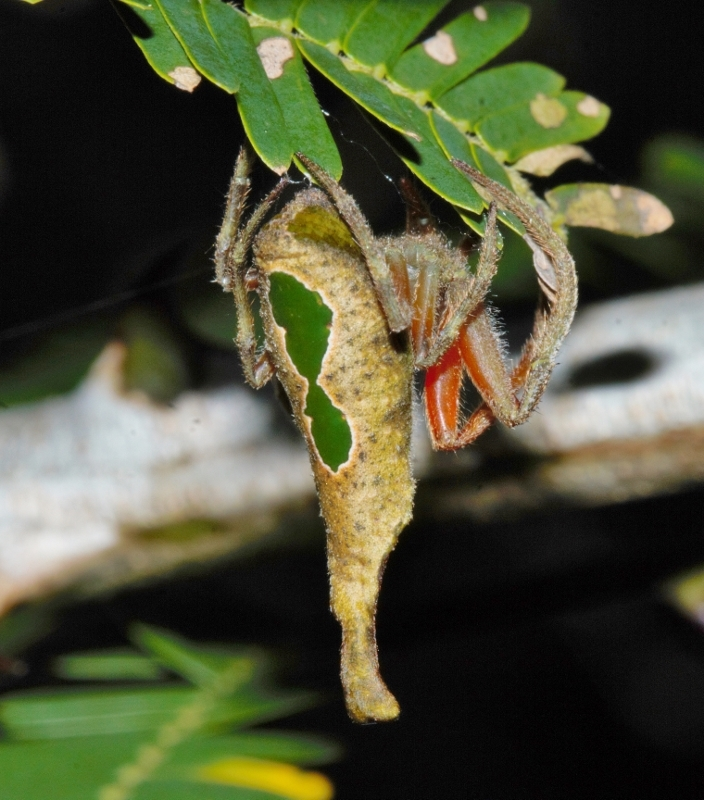
- P. furcifer

Scientific classification
- Kingdom: Animalia
- Phylum: Arthropoda
- Subphylum: Chelicerata
- Class: Arachnida
- Order: Araneae
- Infraorder: Araneomorphae
- Family: Araneidae
- Genus: Poltys
- Species: P. furcifer

Binomial name
- Poltys furcifer Simon, 1881

= Poltys furcifer =

Poltys Orb-Web Spider

Species of spider

Poltys furcifer is an African species of spider in the family Araneidae.

== Distribution ==
Poltys furcifer is an African endemic originally described by Simon in 1881 from Tanzania (Zanzibar). The species has also been collected from Mozambique, Zimbabwe and South Africa, and is suspected to occur in more countries within this range.

In South Africa, the species has been recorded from six provinces and five protected areas at altitudes ranging from 78 to 1,556 metres above sea level. Records include locations in Eastern Cape, Gauteng, KwaZulu-Natal, Limpopo, Mpumalanga, and North West provinces, with specific localities such as Grahamstown, Pretoria, Empangeni, Pongola, Tembe Elephant Park, Ndumo Game Reserve, Dendron, Medikwe Heritage Site, Nylsvley Nature Reserve, Schagen, Bourke's Luck, and Kgaswane Nature Reserve.

== Habitat and ecology ==
The species makes dense orb-webs in vegetation at night. During the day they hide between the vegetation. The species has been sampled from the Grassland and Savanna biomes.

== Description ==
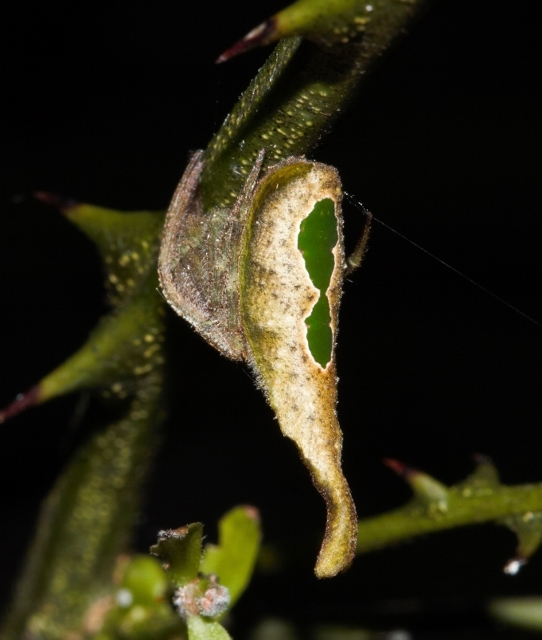

== Conservation ==
Poltys furcifer is listed as Least Concern by the South African National Biodiversity Institute due to its wide geographical range. The species is protected in Nylsvley Nature Reserve, Tembe Elephant Park, Ndumo Game Reserve, and Kgaswane Nature Reserve. There are no significant threats to the species.

== Etymology ==
The specific epithet "furcifer" is derived from Latin meaning "fork-bearer".

== Taxonomy ==
The species was originally described by Eugène Simon in 1881 from Tanzania (Zanzibar). It has not been revised and is known only from the female.
