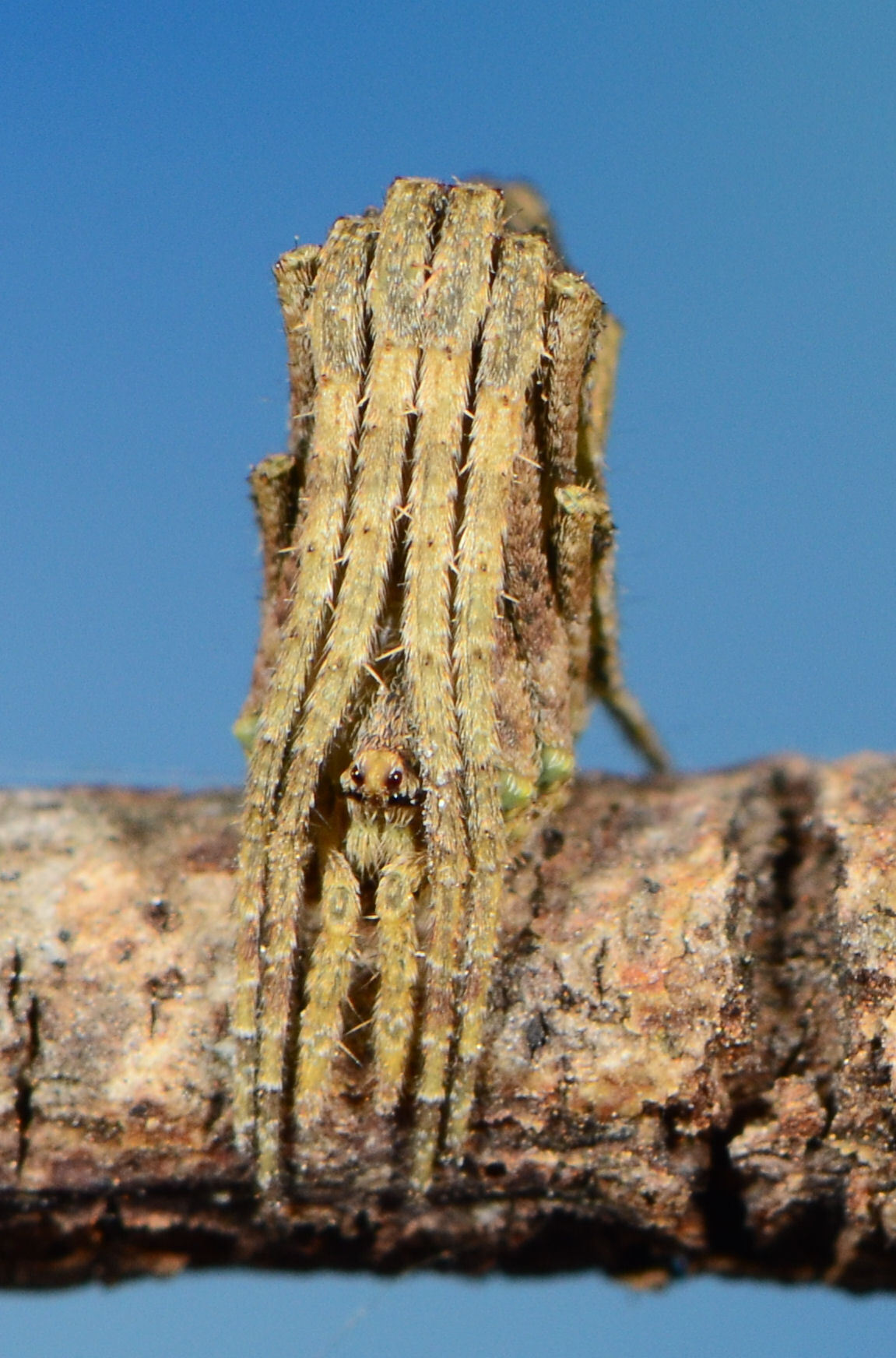
- female C. larvatus
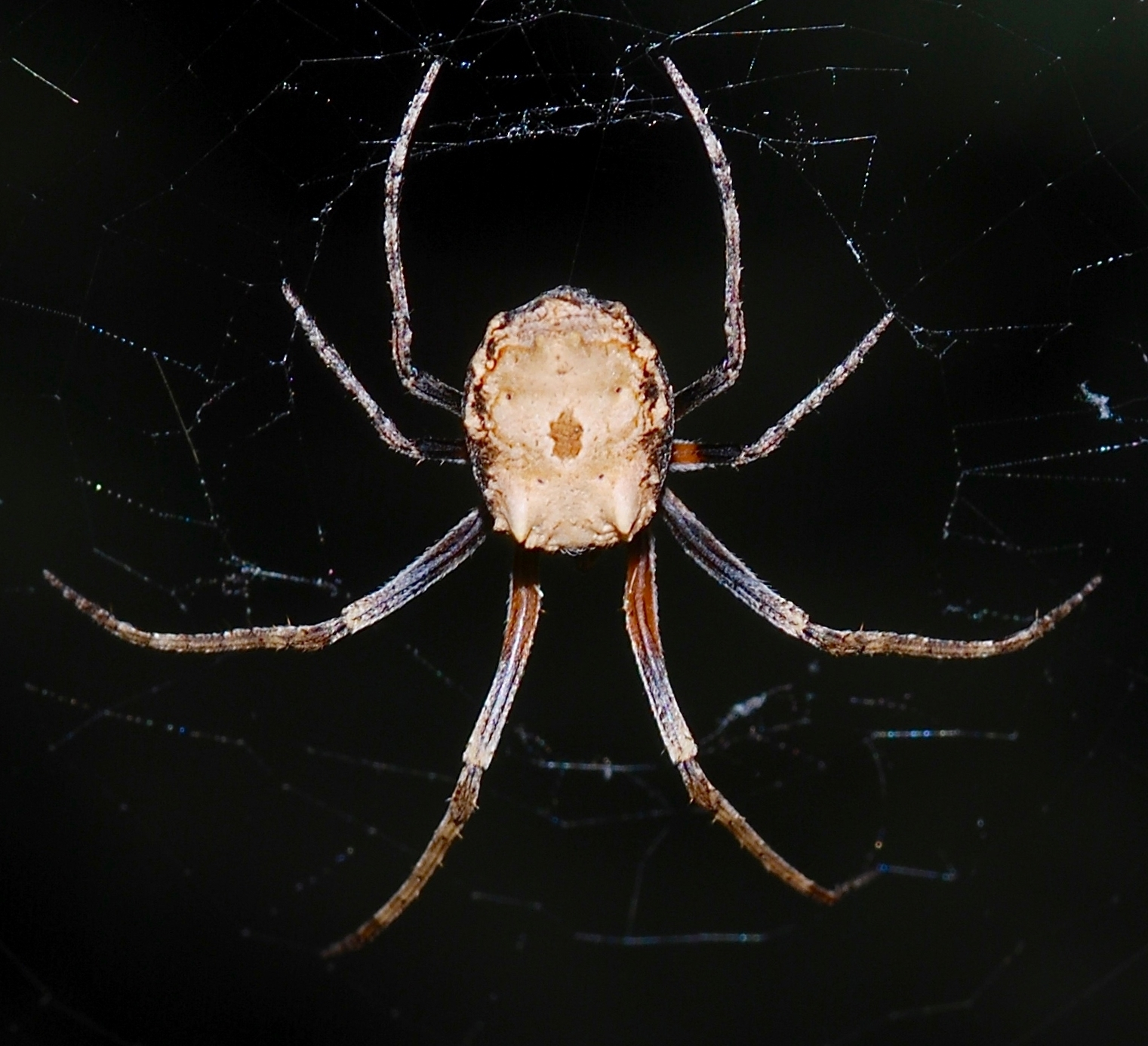
- female C. larvatus (type species)

Scientific classification
- Kingdom: Animalia
- Phylum: Arthropoda
- Subphylum: Chelicerata
- Class: Arachnida
- Order: Araneae
- Infraorder: Araneomorphae
- Family: Araneidae
- Genus: Cyphalonotus; Simon, 1895

Type species
- C. larvatus (Simon, 1881)

Species
- 8, see text

= Cyphalonotus =

Genus of spiders

Cyphalonotus is a genus of orb-weaver spiders first described by Eugène Simon in 1895.

== Life style ==
Cyphalonotus is widely distributed in the eastern parts of the Afrotropical Region, but little is known about its biology. Archer (1965) suggested that this genus belongs to the group that does not construct a formal web but Lawrence (1952) found specimen in webs on shrubs as well as specimens without webs among damp leaves. In Irene (Webb 2013) photographed Cyphalonotus larvatus after dark in a large orb-web.

The spider hangs in the centre with the legs spread out. When disturbed, the legs, with the web are pulled together. The web is taken down during the day, when they rest on bark with the legs protruding into the air and arranged around the body (Dippenaar-Schoeman et al. 2013). Only one species has been recorded in South Africa but there might be more. Field data indicate that the genus have been collected in savanna grassland as well as from trees such as Vachellia tortilis. In the Nylsvley Nature Reserve the species was sampled from Grewia flavescens and Ochna pulchra trees.

== Description ==
Females and males are 5–8 mm long but 10 mm high. The female carapace is cryptic greyish-brown and hairy. The eyes are slightly separated on a forward protruding eye tubercle with both lateral eyes close together at the base of the eye tubercle. The abdomen is triangular in lateral view with the dorsal part having a large hump. The abdomen is the same colour as the carapace and much higher than wide, having numerous antero-dorsal lobes and processes. The posterior vertical face is very extensive, with short processes. The legs lack ventral spines on the femora, are long, with leg III being the shortest.

== Species ==
As of November 2026, this genus includes eight species:

- Cyphalonotus assuliformis Simon, 1909 – China, Vietnam
- Cyphalonotus benoiti Archer, 1965 – DR Congo
- Cyphalonotus columnifer Simon, 1903 – Madagascar
- Cyphalonotus elongatus Yin, Peng & Wang, 1994 – China
- Cyphalonotus larvatus (Simon, 1881) – Africa, Yemen (Socotra) (type species)
- Cyphalonotus selangor Dzulhelmi, 2015 – Malaysia
- Cyphalonotus sumatranus Simon, 1899 – Indonesia (Sumatra)
- Cyphalonotus variabilis Yu, Kuntner & Cheng, 2022 – Taiwan
