= Paraharmochirus =

Scientific classification
- Kingdom: Animalia
- Phylum: Arthropoda
- Subphylum: Chelicerata
- Class: Arachnida
- Order: Araneae
- Infraorder: Araneomorphae
- Family: Salticidae
- Subfamily: Salticinae
- Genus: Paraharmochirus; Szombathy, 1915

Type species
- P. monstrosus Szombathy, 1915

Species
- P. monstrosus Szombathy, 1915 – New Guinea; P. tualapaensis Zhang & Maddison, 2012 – New Guinea

Genus of spiders

Paraharmochirus is a genus of Papuan jumping spiders that was first described by C. Szombathy in 1915. As of August 2019 it contains only two species, found only in Papua New Guinea: P. monstrosus and P. tualapaensis. The name is a combination of the Ancient Greek "para" (παρά), meaning "alongside", and the salticid genus Harmochirus.
