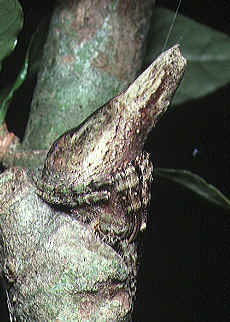

Scientific classification
- Kingdom: Animalia
- Phylum: Arthropoda
- Subphylum: Chelicerata
- Class: Arachnida
- Order: Araneae
- Infraorder: Araneomorphae
- Family: Araneidae
- Genus: Poltys
- Species: P. columnaris

Binomial name
- Poltys columnaris Thorell, 1890

= Poltys columnaris =

Tree stump spider

Species of spider

Poltys columnaris, known as the tree stump spider, is a species of spider of the genus Poltys. It is found in India, Sri Lanka, Sumatra, and Japan.

== Description ==
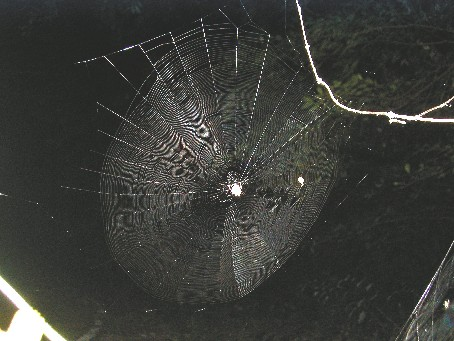
web

The spider has unusual column-shaped abdomen with shiny spots called maculae at base. It is mainly a nocturnal hunter, remaining motionless during the day. The male is very much smaller in size at 1.5-2.1 mm; the female is larger at 7.8-15.1 mm.
