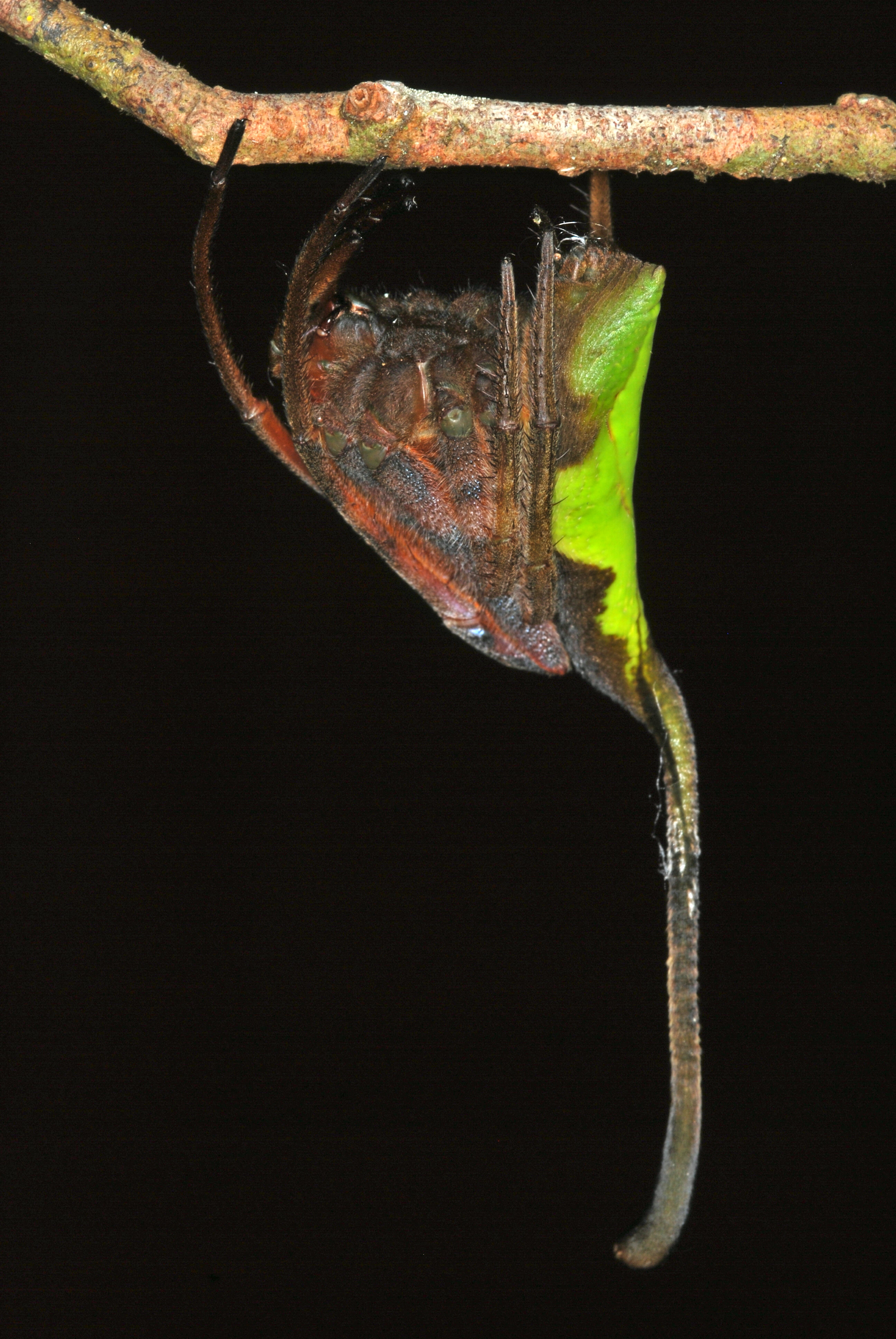
- Poltys mouhoti

Scientific classification
- Kingdom: Animalia
- Phylum: Arthropoda
- Subphylum: Chelicerata
- Class: Arachnida
- Order: Araneae
- Infraorder: Araneomorphae
- Family: Araneidae
- Genus: Poltys; C. L. Koch, 1843

Type species
- Poltys illepidus C. L. Koch, 1843

Species
- 43, see text

= Poltys (spider) =

Genus of spiders

Poltys is a genus of orb-weaver spiders first described by C. L. Koch in 1843. Many species are cryptic and are known to masquerade as leaves and twigs during the day, with the shape of the opisthosoma giving it the impression of a rough and broken branch, and the shape can vary among individuals within a species, promoting crypsis. As an orb-weaver, these spiders build an orb web at night to capture prey; the web is eaten up before dawn and reconstructed after dusk.

== Description ==
Poltys is a rather distinctive araneid genus that can be recognized by a combination of widely separated lateral eyes and a pear-shaped carapace, where the "stalk" of the pear is an eye tubercle present as a frontally elevated projection.

The median ocular quadrangle is as long as it is wide, the lateral eyes are widely separated and the median eyes are situated anterior on eye tubercles. Legs I and II are long with flat curved and spinulose tibiae and metatarsi. The large abdomen is anteriorly elevated and bears irregular tubercles.

== Species ==
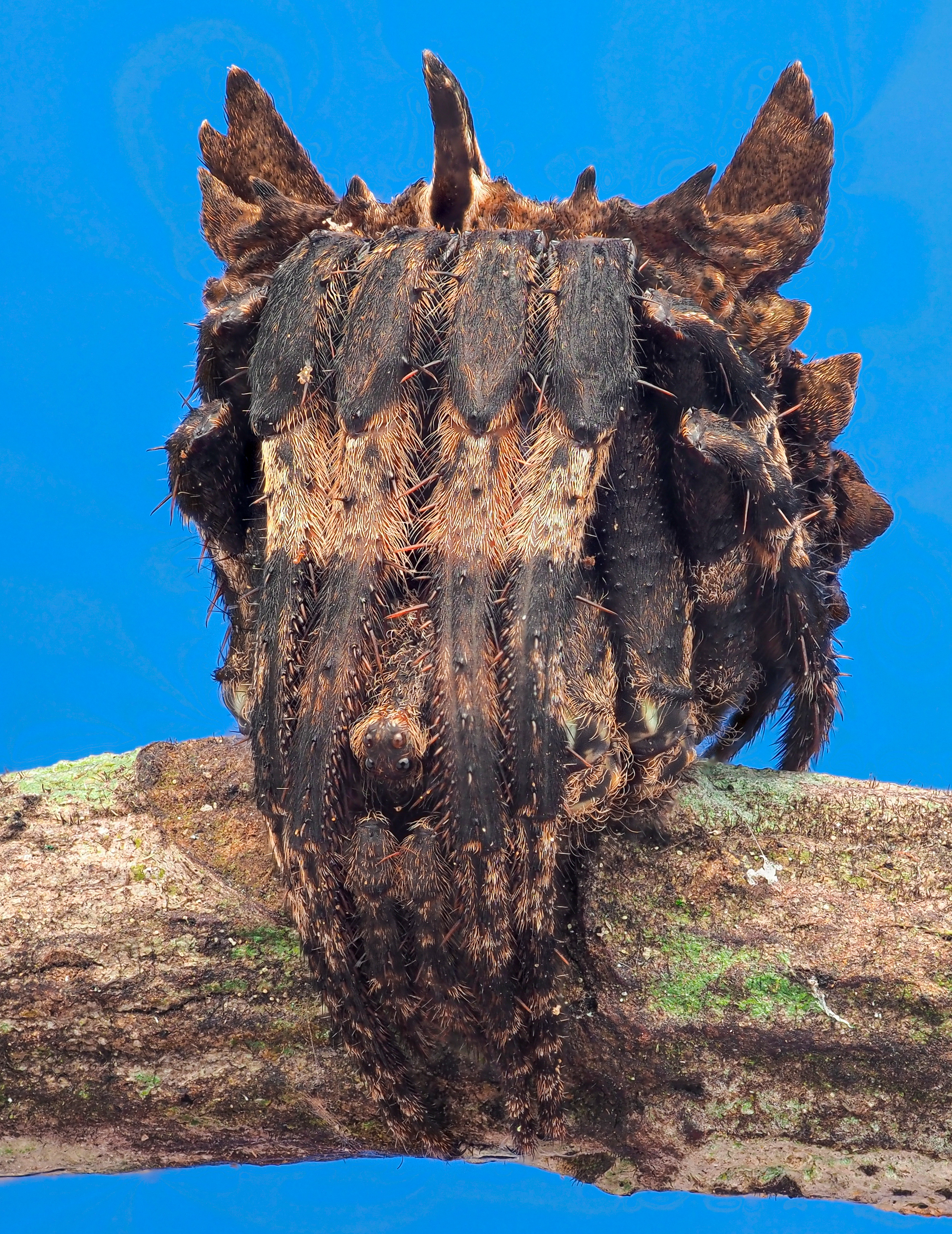
Poltys sp. from India

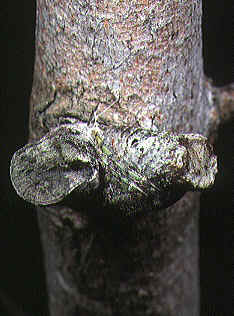
female P. columnaris

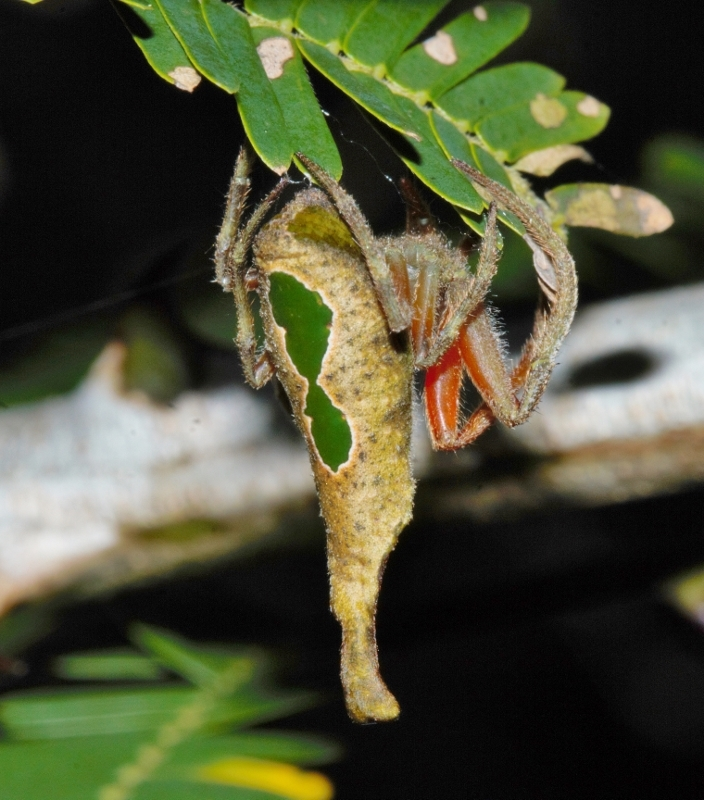
P. furcifer

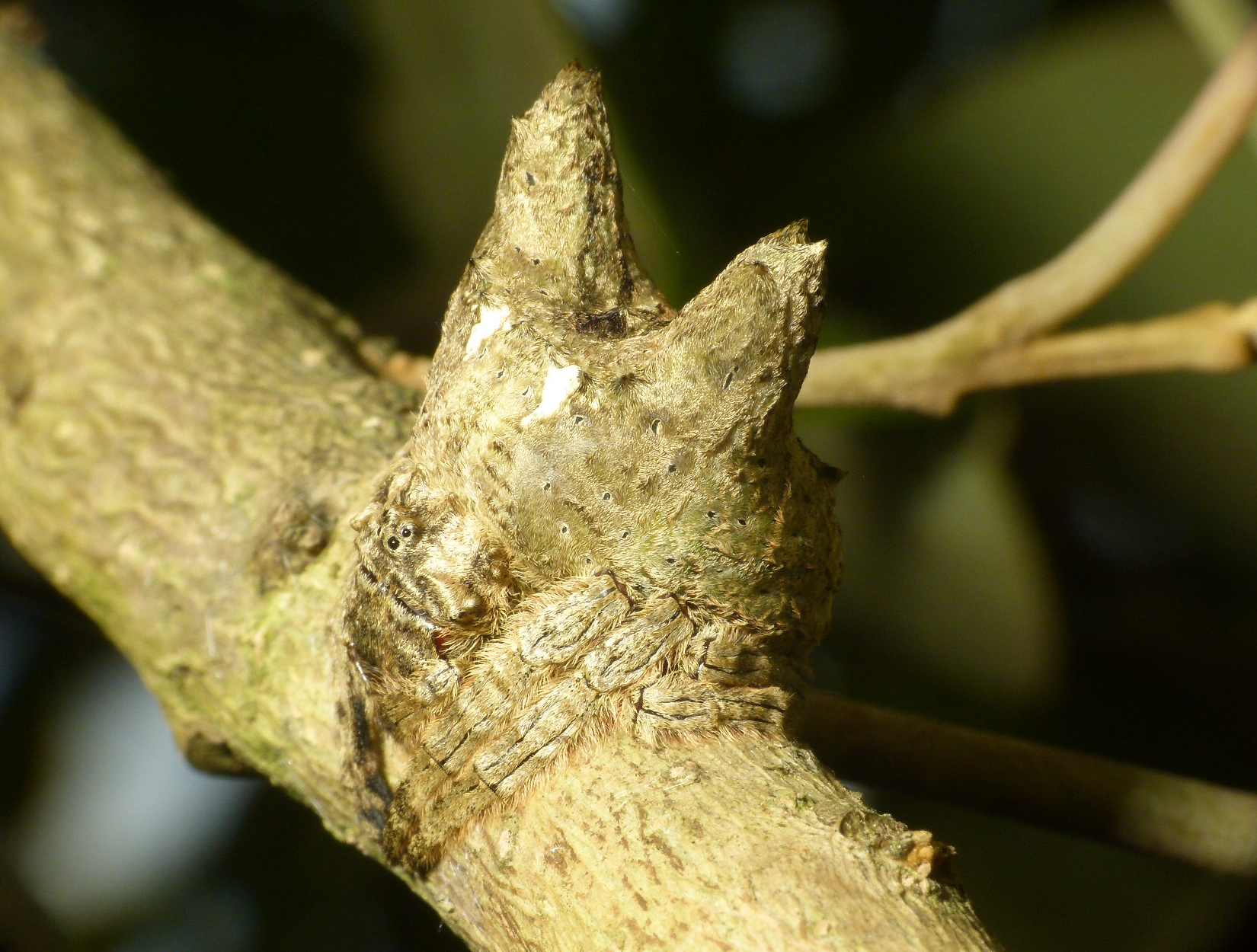
Poltys sp. from India

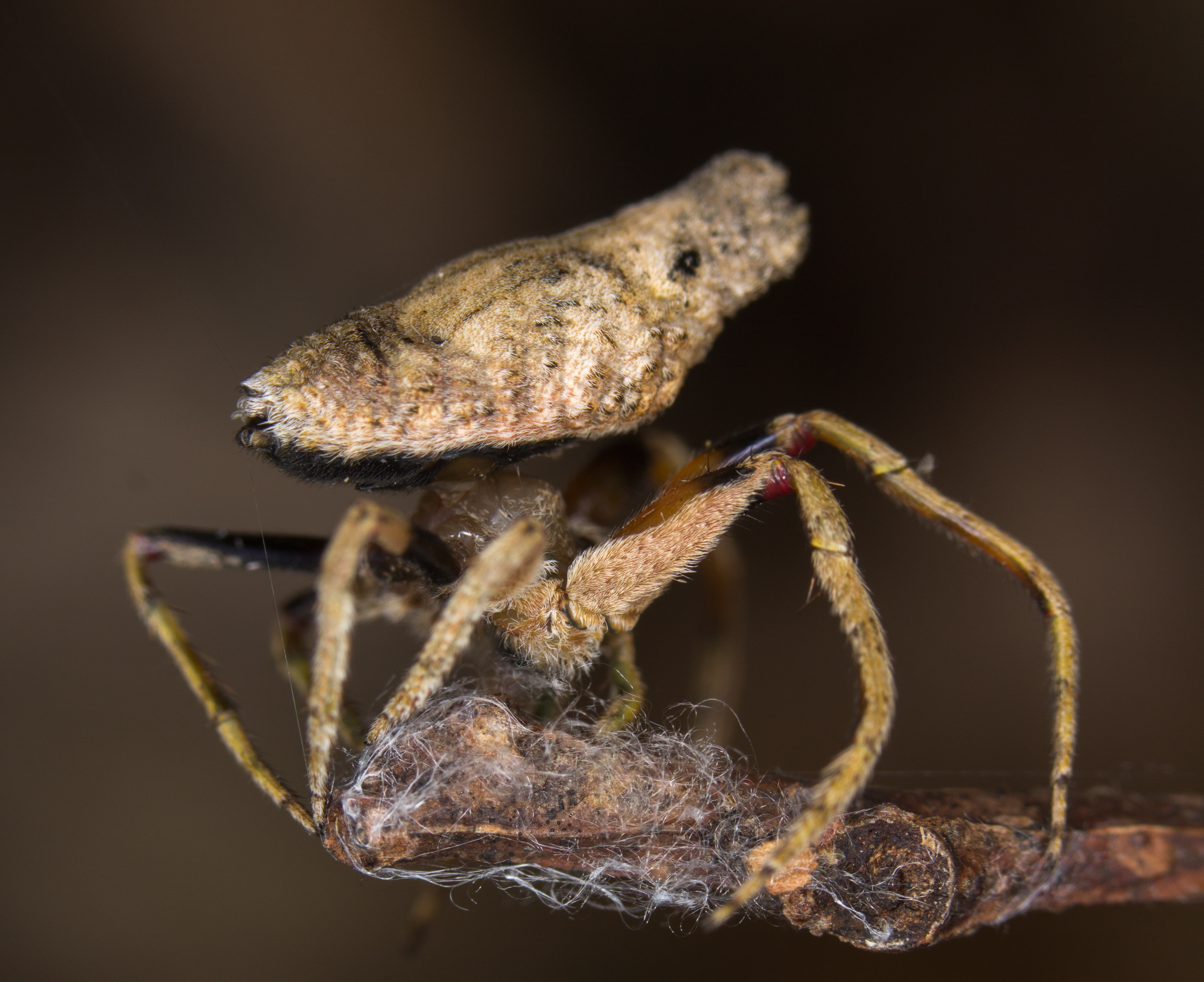
P. laciniosus from Australia

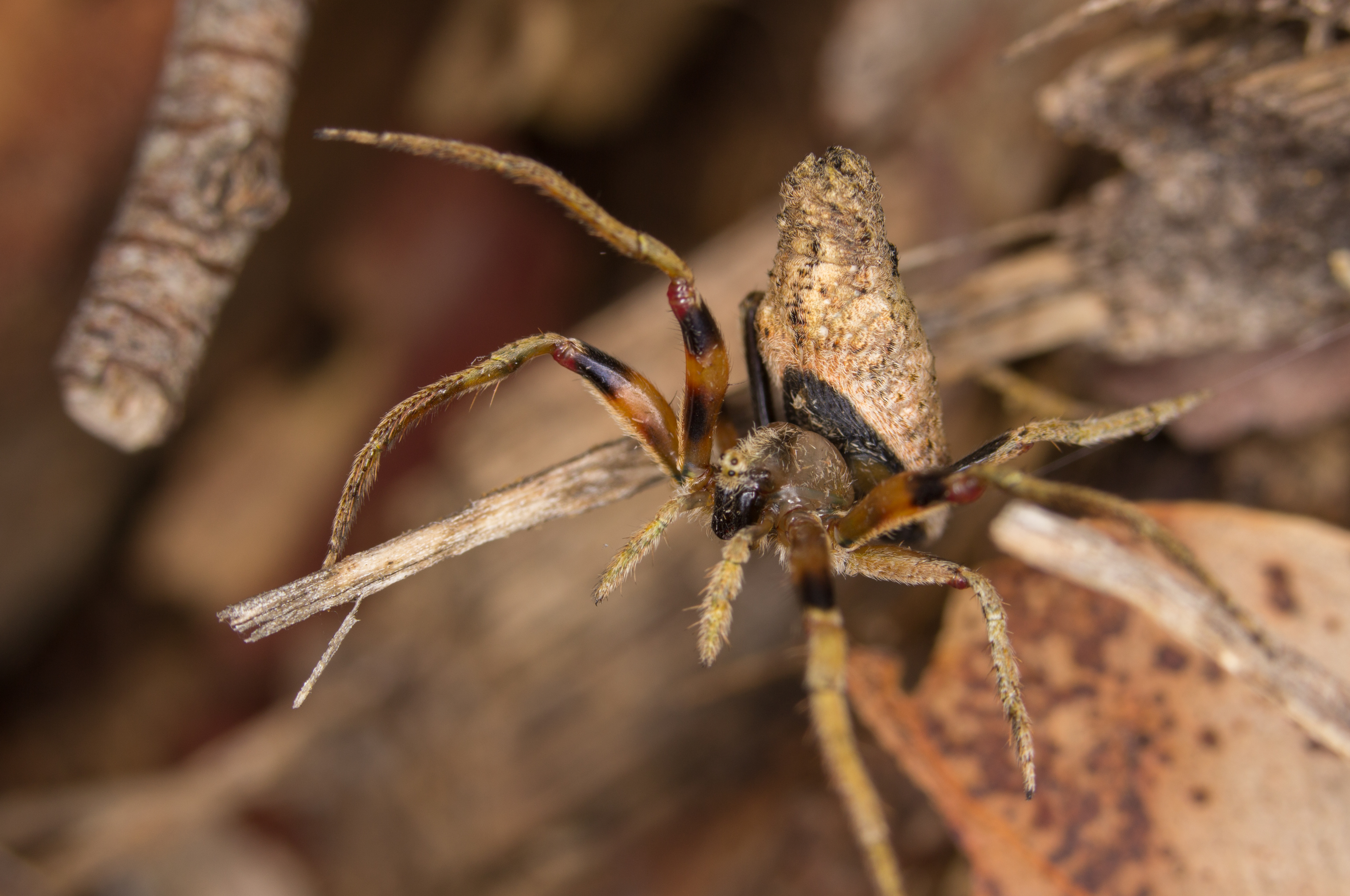
P. laciniosus

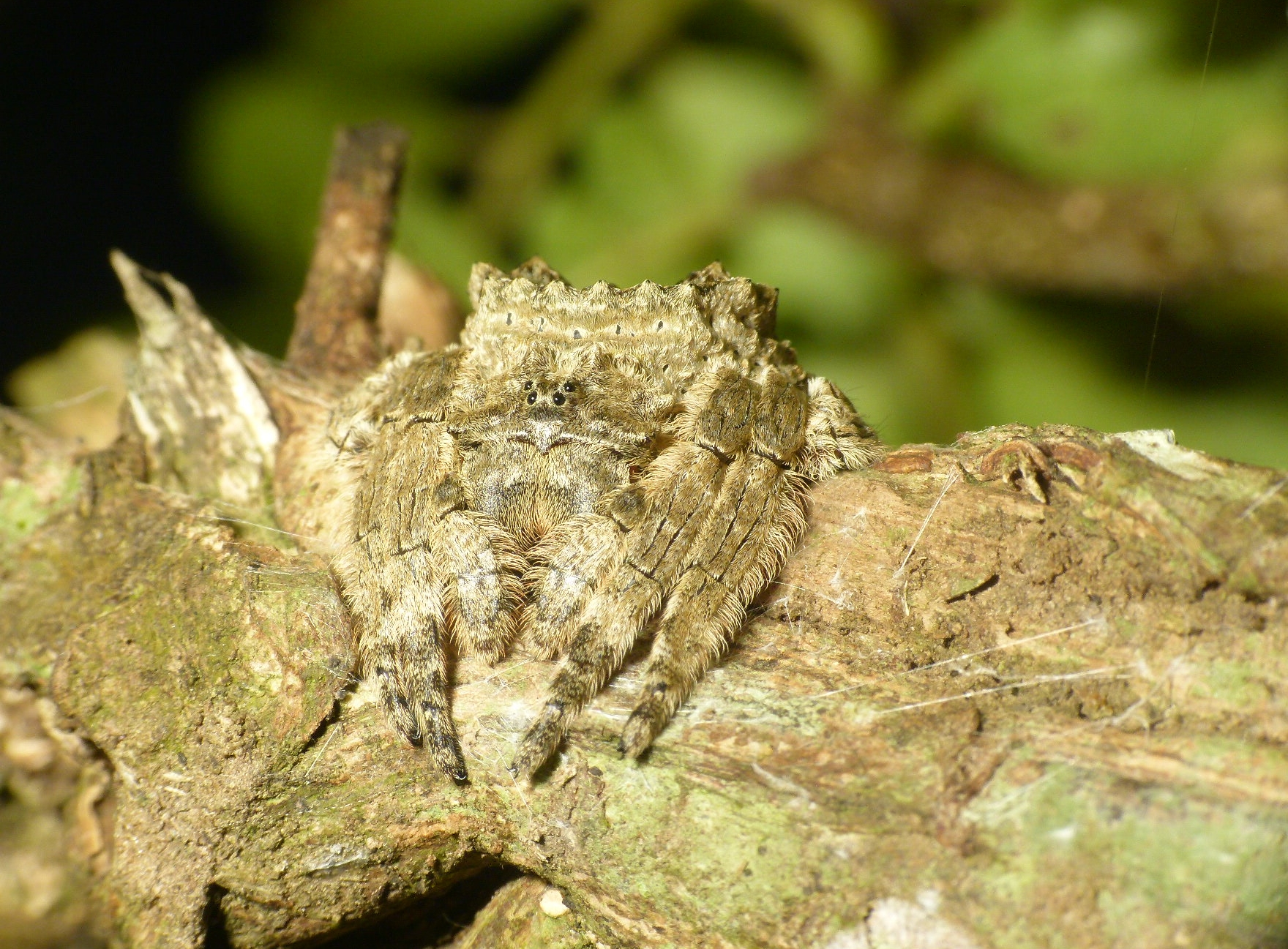
Poltys sp. from India

As of September 2025 it contains 42 described species:

African species:

- Poltys baculiger Simon, 1907 – Gabon
- Poltys caelatus Simon, 1907 – Sierra Leone, Gabon, São Tomé and Príncipe
- Poltys corticosus Pocock, 1898 – Kenya
- Poltys fornicatus Simon, 1907 – São Tomé and Príncipe
- Poltys furcifer Simon, 1881 – Tanzania, Zimbabwe, Mozambique, South Africa
- Poltys monstrosus Simon, 1897 – Sierra Leone

Indo-Pacific species:

- Poltys acuminatus Thorell, 1898 – Myanmar
- Poltys apiculatus Thorell, 1892 – Singapore
- Poltys bhabanii (Tikader, 1970) – India
- Poltys bhavnagarensis Patel, 1988 – India
- Poltys columnaris Thorell, 1890 – India, Sri Lanka, Indonesia (Sumatra), Japan
- Poltys dubius (Walckenaer, 1841) – Vietnam
- Poltys elevatus Thorell, 1890 – Indonesia (Sumatra)
- Poltys ellipticus Han, Zhang & Zhu, 2010 – China
- Poltys frenchi Hogg, 1899 – New Guinea, Indonesia (Moluccas), Australia (Queensland)
- Poltys grayi Smith, 2006 – Australia (Lord Howe Is.)
- Poltys hainanensis Han, Zhang & Zhu, 2010 – China
- Poltys horridus Locket, 1980 – Comoros, Seychelles
- Poltys idae (Ausserer, 1871) – China, Borneo
- Poltys illepidus C. L. Koch, 1843 (type) – Thailand to Australia (mainland, Lord Howe Is., Norfolk Is.)
- Poltys jujorum Smith, 2006 – Australia (Queensland)
- Poltys kochi Keyserling, 1864 – Mauritius, Madagascar
- Poltys laciniosus Keyserling, 1886 – Australia
- Poltys longitergus Hogg, 1919 – Indonesia (Sumatra)
- Poltys milledgei Smith, 2006 – Australia (Western Australia, Northern Territory), Indonesia (Bali, Sumbawa)
- Poltys mouhoti (Günther, 1862) – Vietnam
- Poltys nagpurensis Tikader, 1982 – Iran, India
- Poltys nigrinus Saito, 1933 – Taiwan
- Poltys noblei Smith, 2006 – Australia (Queensland, New South Wales, Victoria)
- Poltys pannuceus Thorell, 1895 – Myanmar
- Poltys pogonias Thorell, 1891 – India (Nicobar Is.)
- Poltys pygmaeus Han, Zhang & Zhu, 2010 – China
- Poltys raphanus Thorell, 1898 – Myanmar
- Poltys reuteri Lenz, 1886 – Madagascar
- Poltys squarrosus Thorell, 1898 – Myanmar
- Poltys stygius Thorell, 1898 – Myanmar to Australia (Queensland)
- Poltys timmeh Smith, 2006 – New Caledonia, Loyalty Is.
- Poltys turriger Simon, 1897 – Vietnam
- Poltys turritus Thorell, 1898 – Myanmar
- Poltys unguifer Simon, 1909 – Vietnam
- Poltys vesicularis Simon, 1889 – Madagascar
- Poltys waipo Mi, Wang & Li, 2024 – China

Unnamed species of leaf mimic, southwest China and Vietnam.
