= Paraharmochirus monstrosus =

Scientific classification
- Kingdom: Animalia
- Phylum: Arthropoda
- Subphylum: Chelicerata
- Class: Arachnida
- Order: Araneae
- Infraorder: Araneomorphae
- Family: Salticidae
- Genus: Paraharmochirus
- Species: P. monstrosus

Binomial name
- Paraharmochirus monstrosus Szombathy, 1915

Species of spider

Paraharmochirus monstrosus is a jumping spider in the genus Paraharmochirus that lives in Papua New Guinea. It has an ant like body.
