= Poltys =

Poltys is also a genus of spiders

In Greek mythology, Poltys (Ancient Greek: Πόλτυς) is a mythical king and eponym of the Thracian city of Poltyobria (or Poltymbria; also called Aenus), featured in Apollodorus's account of the story of the hero Heracles. Poltys and his brother Sarpedon are given as sons of the sea-god Poseidon.

== Mythology ==
Poltys hosted Heracles when the hero came to Aenus; although Poltys welcomed Heracles, Sarpedon did not, and was slain by Heracles on the beach.

In a story related by Plutarch (Morals), Poltys ruled at the outbreak of the Trojan War, and was solicited both by the Trojan and Greek ambassadors. Poltys advised Paris to restore Helen, promising to give him two beautiful women to replace her. The advice was declined. Homer does not mention Poltys in the Iliad, and the story is obviously post-Homeric.
