= Geren (mythology) =

Character from Greek mythology

In Greek mythology, Geren (Ancient Greek: Γέρηνος Gerēn) was the eponym of the town of Geren in Lesbos. He was the son of Poseidon.
