= Geren (Lesbos) =

Geren (Ancient Greek: Γέρην) was a town of ancient Lesbos.

The site of Geren is unlocated.
