= Dryope =

In Greek mythology, Dryope (/ˈdraɪ.əpiː/; Ancient Greek: Δρυόπη derived from δρῦς drys, "oak"; dryope "woodpecker") is the name attributed to several distinct figures:

- Dryope, daughter of Dryops and mother of Amphissus by Apollo. She was the wife of Andraemon.
- Dryope/Fauna, mother of Tarquitus by Faunus, the god of the woods. Tarquitus was slain by Aeneas.
- Dryope, a nymph responsible for kidnapping Hylas, which she did in accord with Hera's will. Her name may have to do with the fact that Hylas was the son of Theiodamas, the king of the Dryopes.
- Dryope, a Theban woman of Phoenician origin, mother of Chromis. She joined the Maenads disregarding her pregnancy, and went into labor when she was dragging a sacrificial bull by the horns.
- Dryope, a Lemnian.
- Dryope, mother of the Oenotropae by Anius.

== See also ==
- Dryopia
