= Mecionice =

Greek mythological figure

In Greek mythology, Mecionice (Ancient Greek: Μηκιονίκη, romanized: Mēkioníkē) or Mecionica was a Boeotian woman from Hyria who consorted with Poseidon and had by this god a son Euphemus, one of the Argonauts. She was the daughter of the giant Orion or Eurotas.

Otherwise, Euphemus' mother was also called Europe, daughter of Tityos; Doris (Oris) daughter of Europa and Macionassa.

Compare Mecionice with Menodice, another daughter of Orion, who gave birth to Hylas to King Theiodamas of the Dryopians. They might be the same woman who mothered the heroes Euphemus and Hylas to Theiodamas - this could be supported by the stories that recall Hylas as an arms-bearer of Heracles who had a half-sister Laonome that married Euphemus.
