= Pegaea =

In Greek mythology, the name Pegaea (Ancient Greek: ἡ Πηγαία) may refer to:

- Pegaea (mythology), one of the Ionides
- Pegaea, singular form of Pegaeae
