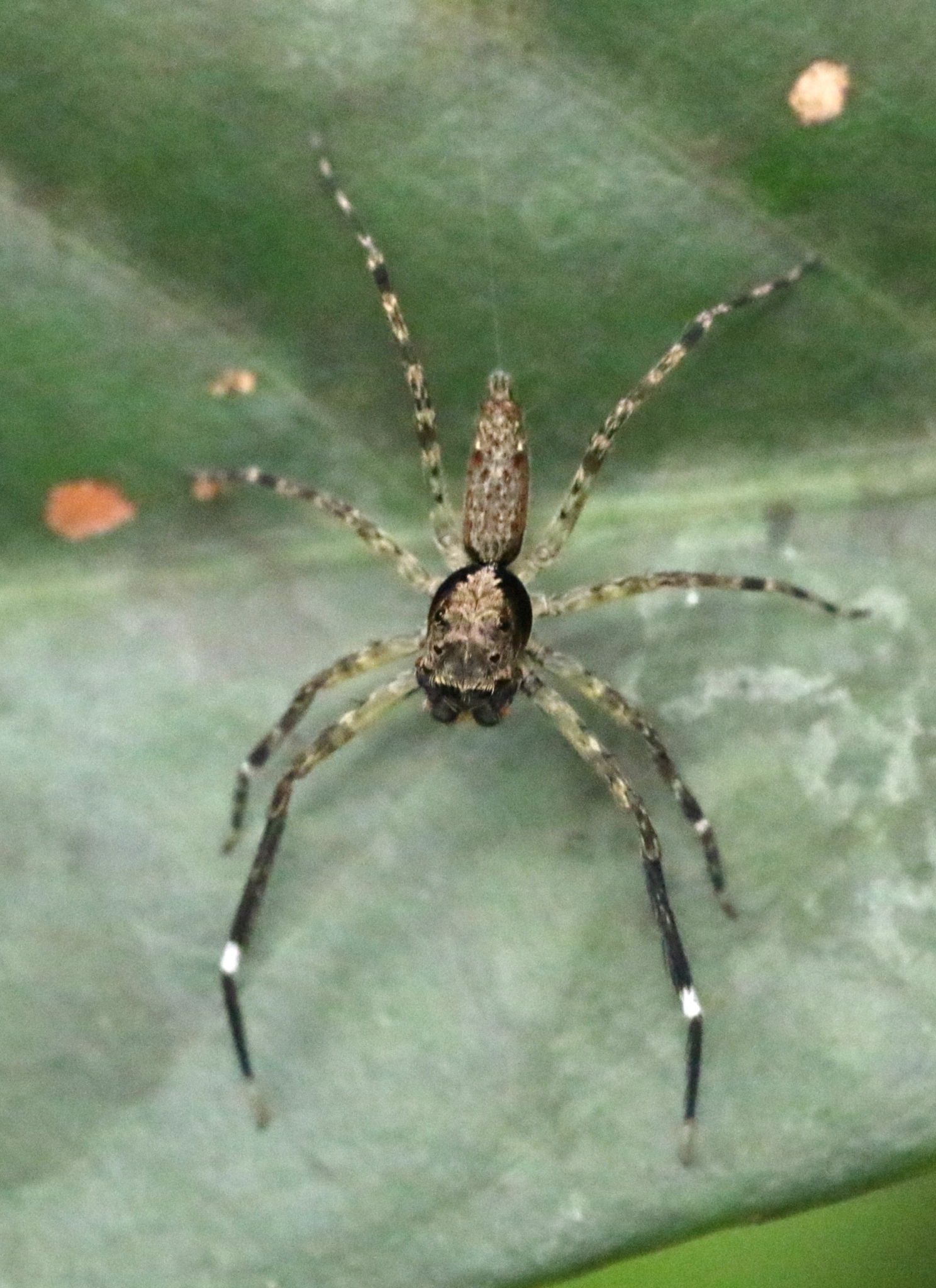
- S. zhangi from Hong Kong

Scientific classification
- Kingdom: Animalia
- Phylum: Arthropoda
- Subphylum: Chelicerata
- Class: Arachnida
- Order: Araneae
- Infraorder: Araneomorphae
- Family: Salticidae
- Subfamily: Spartaeinae
- Genus: Spartaeus; Thorell, 1891

Type species
- S. spinimanus (Thorell, 1878)

Species
- 19, see text

= Spartaeus =

Genus of spiders

Spartaeus is a genus of Asian jumping spiders that was first described by Tamerlan Thorell in 1891. These spiders build large sheet webs on tree trunks to capture prey, mostly moths. When walking, they wave their palps and legs in an unusual way.

The genus was renamed from Boethus in 1984 because the name was found to be preoccupied. It is named after the son of the Rhodian nymph Himalia and Zeus in Greek mythology.

== Species ==
As of August 2019 it contains nineteen species, found only in Asia:

- Spartaeus abramovi Logunov & Azarkina, 2008 – Vietnam
- Spartaeus bani (Ikeda, 1995) – Japan
- Spartaeus banthamus Logunov & Azarkina, 2008 – Laos
- Spartaeus ellipticus Bao & Peng, 2002 – Taiwan
- Spartaeus emeishan Zhu, Yang & Zhang, 2007 – China
- Spartaeus forcipiformis Yang, W. Liu, P. Liu & Peng, 2017 – China
- Spartaeus jaegeri Logunov & Azarkina, 2008 – Laos
- Spartaeus jianfengensis Song & Chai, 1991 – China
- Spartaeus karigiri Caleb et al., 2025 – India
- Spartaeus noctivagus Logunov & Azarkina, 2008 – Laos
- Spartaeus pinniformis Yang, W. Liu, P. Liu & Peng, 2017 – China
- Spartaeus platnicki Song, Chen & Gong, 1991 – China
- Spartaeus serratus Yang, W. Liu, P. Liu & Peng, 2017 – China
- Spartaeus spinimanus (Thorell, 1878) (type) – Sri Lanka to Indonesia (Borneo, Sumbawa)
- Spartaeus tengchongensis Yang, W. Liu, P. Liu & Peng, 2017 – China
- Spartaeus thailandicus Wanless, 1984 – China, Thailand
- Spartaeus triapiculus Yang, W. Liu, P. Liu & Peng, 2017 – China
- Spartaeus uplandicus Barrion & Litsinger, 1995 – Philippines
- Spartaeus wildtrackii Wanless, 1987 – Malaysia
- Spartaeus zhangi Peng & Li, 2002 – China, Laos
