= Hylas and the Nymphs (painting) =

Painting by John William Waterhouse

- Artist: John William Waterhouse
- Year: 1896
- Subject: Hylas and a group of nymphs
- Dimensions: 98.2 cm × 163.3 cm (38.7 in × 64.3 in)
- Location: Manchester Art Gallery

Hylas and the Nymphs is an 1896 oil painting by John William Waterhouse. The painting depicts a moment from the Greek and Roman legend of the tragic youth Hylas, based on accounts by Ovid and other ancient writers, in which the enraptured Hylas is abducted by Naiads (female water nymphs) while seeking drinking water.

Hylas and the Nymphs is exhibited in the Manchester Art Gallery.

== Background ==
=== Myth ===
Hylas was the son of King Theiodamas of the Dryopians. After Hercules killed Hylas's father, Hylas became a companion of Hercules. They both became Argonauts, accompanying Jason in his quest on his ship Argo in seeking the Golden Fleece. During the journey, Hylas was sent to find fresh water. He found a pond occupied by Naiads, and they lured Hylas into the water and he disappeared.

=== The painting ===
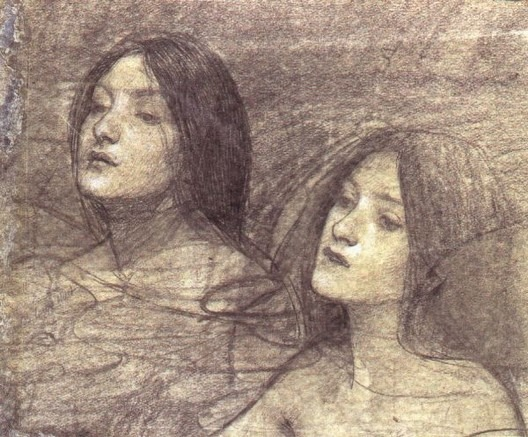
Study for two nymphs

The painting measures 98.2 by 163.3 centimetres (38.7 in × 64.3 in). It depicts Hylas, a male youth in classical garb, wearing a blue tunic with a red sash, and bearing a wide-necked water jar. He is bending down beside a pond in a glade of lush green foliage, reaching out towards seven young women, the water nymphs, who are emerging from the pond among the leaves and flowers of Nymphaeaceae (water lilies), including an early depiction of the yellow waterlily, Nuphar lutea. The nymphs are naked, their alabaster skin luminous in the dark but clear water, with yellow and white flowers in their auburn hair. They have very similar physical features, perhaps based on just two models.

Hylas is being enticed to enter the water, from which he will not return. One of the nymphs holds his wrist and elbow, a second plucks at his tunic, and a third holds out some pearls in the palm of her hand. The face of Hylas in profile is shadowed and barely visible, but the faces of the nymphs are clearly visible as they gaze upon him. The scene is depicted from a slightly elevated position, looking down at the water like Hylas, so no sky is visible. Hylas's position forces the viewer's focus onto the nymphs in the water and the lack of reference to his relationship with Hercules emphasizes that the narrative of the painting is not about Hylas's experiences, but about the sinister nature of the nymphs.

Some of Waterhouse's preparatory sketches are in the Ashmolean Museum in Oxford.

== Significance ==
Hylas was a recurrent theme for British artists in the 19th and early 20th centuries, with examples by William Etty (1833) and Henrietta Rae (1910), and an earlier example by Waterhouse himself (1893). Waterhouse also painted other tragic youths from Greek legend, such as Narcissus in Echo and Narcissus (1903) (at the Walker Art Gallery in Liverpool). His poem "Hercules and Hylas" was published by Francis Burdett Thomas Coutts-Nevill in 1896.

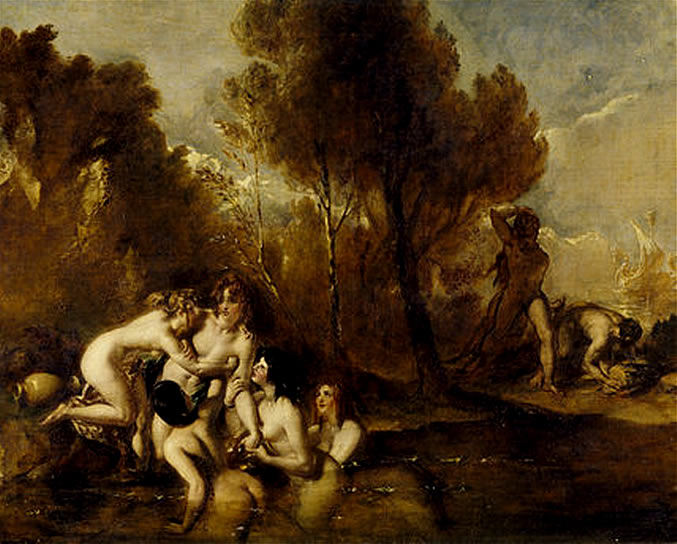
William Etty, Young Hylas with the Water Nymphs, 1833

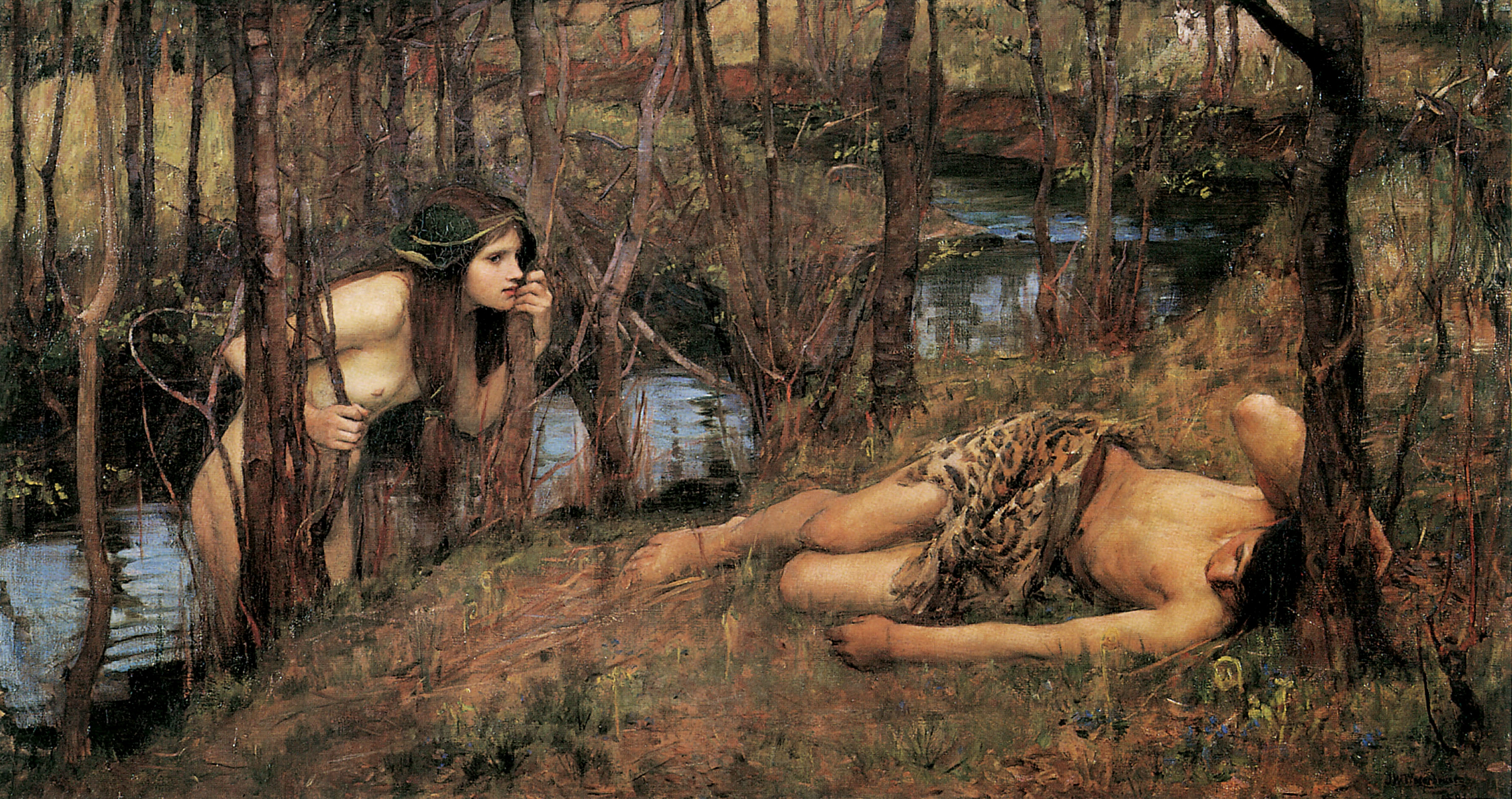
Waterhouse, A Naiad or Hylas with a Nymph, 1893

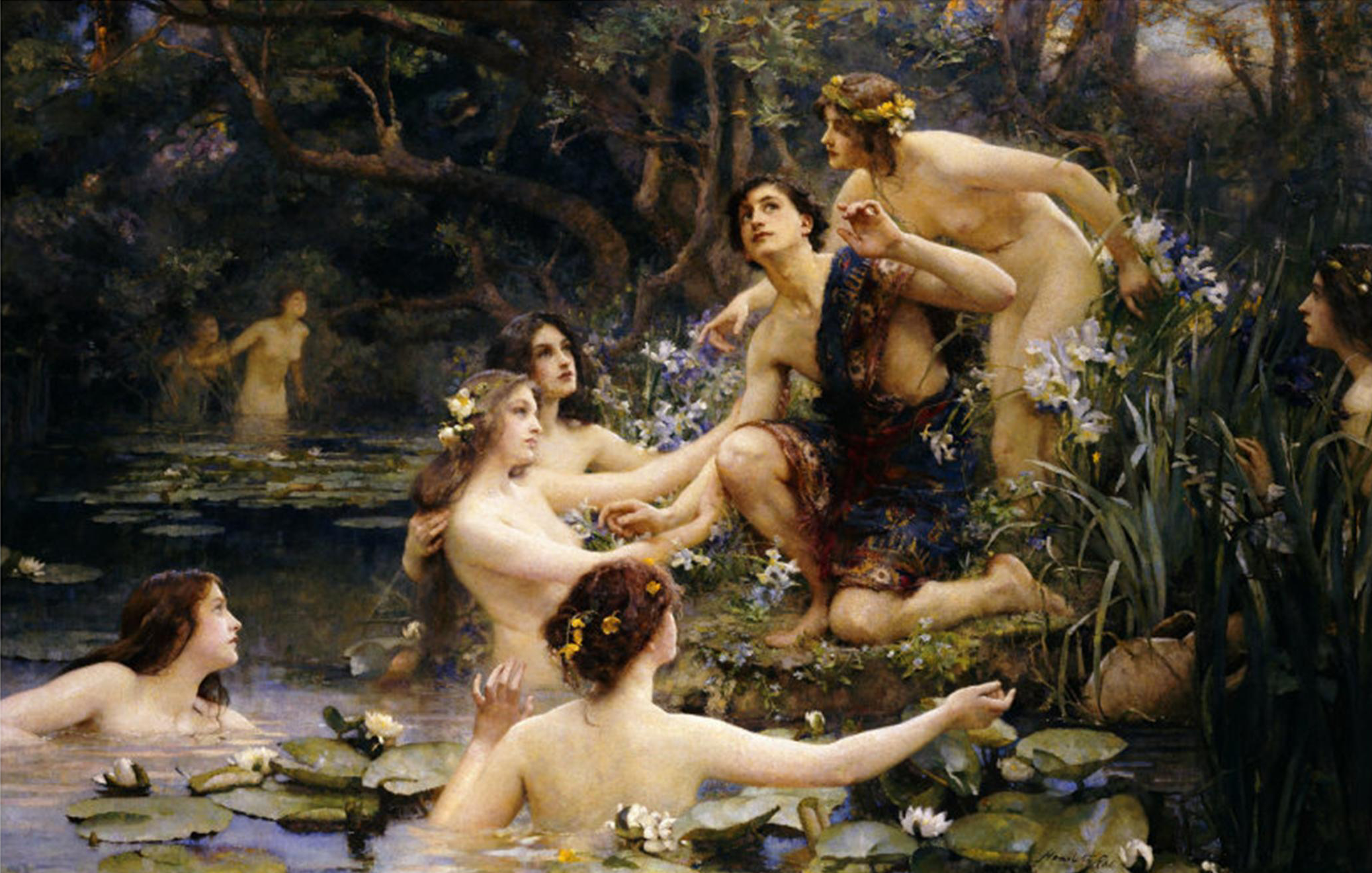
Henrietta Rae, Hylas and the Water Nymphs, 1909

== Display ==
The painting Hylas and the Nymphs was acquired from the artist by the Manchester Art Gallery in 1896. It was exhibited at the Royal Academy Summer Exhibition in 1897.

In January 2018, Manchester Art Gallery curator Clare Gannaway temporarily removed the painting from public display, after a decision "taken by gallery staff [along] with artist Sonia Boyce." The decision, the curator stated, was "influenced by recent movements against the objectification and exploitation of women" such as the MeToo campaign and the Presidents Club controversy. She denied the removal constituted any form of censorship, stating, "we want to see this as the start of a process, not an end point," and providing visitors with Post-It notes to air their views; in the meantime, postcards of the painting were removed from the gift shop.

A "strong backlash" followed the decision. Art historian and author Elizabeth Prettejohn, who had previously curated a Waterhouse exhibition at the Royal Academy, disputed the claims about "public debate", stating that "taking [the painting] off display is killing any kind of debate that you might be able to have." After one week, the Manchester City Council, which runs the gallery, returned the painting to the wall. "It's been clear that many people feel very strongly about the issues raised," stated the council in the announcement.

== See also ==
- List of paintings by John William Waterhouse
