= Oechalides =

Greek mythological duo

In Greek mythology, two virgin Oechalides (Ancient Greek: Οἰχαλίδες, romanized: Oikhalides, lit. 'Oechalian women') were transformed into trees by the nymphs when they revealed the fate of a disappeared priestess. They dwelled in Oechalia, a town in ancient Thessaly.

== Mythology ==
After Dryope married Andraemon and gave birth to Apollo's son Amphissus, she and her husband erected a temple to Apollo, where Dryope served as a priestess. One day the nymphs took Dryope with them and left a poplar tree in her place. Two virgin women of the town told the rest that the nymphs had seized Dryope; the nymphs in anger turned them both into fir trees. (Note: Although Francis Celoria translates the word as 'pines', the ancient text uses 'ἐλάτας', firs.) This was supposedly why women were not allowed in the foot-race in honour of Apollo at Oechalia.

== See also ==
- Cerambus
- Sisyphus
- Clytie

== Bibliography ==
- Antoninus Liberalis, The Metamorphoses of Antoninus Liberalis translated by Francis Celoria (Routledge 1992). Online version at the Topos Text Project.
- Celoria, Francis (1992). The Metamorphoses of Antoninus Liberalis: A Translation with a Commentary. Routledge. ISBN 0-415-06896-7.
- Forbes Irving, Paul M. C. (1990). Metamorphosis in Greek Myths. Clarendon Press. ISBN 0-19-814730-9.
