= Synallaxis (mythology) =

In Greek mythology, Synallaxis or Synallasis (Ancient Greek: Συνάλλασις, lit. 'exchange', 'contract' or 'association/ dealings') was one of the Ionides nymphs whose spring waters were believed to cure diseases. She was an Elean naiad-daughter of the river-god Cytherus and sister to Pegaea, Calliphaea and Iasis.
