= Iasis =

In Greek mythology, Iasis (Ancient Greek: Ἴασις, lit. 'healing', 'cure' or 'remedy') was one of the Ionides nymphs whose spring waters were believed to cure diseases. She was an Elean naiad-daughter of the river-god Cytherus and sister to Synallasis, Pegaea and Calliphaea.

== See also ==
- List of Greek deities
