= Doris (mythology) =

Set index of characters from Greek mythology

In Greek mythology, Doris (/ˈdoʊrɪs/; Ancient Greek: Δωρίς or Δωρίδος, romanized: Dōrís, lit. 'gift', 'bounty' or 'Dorian woman') may refer to two related sea divinities:

- Doris, one of the 3,000 Oceanids, water-nymph daughters of the Titans Oceanus and his sister-wife Tethys. She was the mother of the Nereids and Nerites by the 'Old Man of the Sea' Nereus.
- Doris, one of the 50 Nereids, sea-nymph daughters of the above Oceanid Doris and the sea god Nereus. Doris and her other sisters appeared to Thetis when she cries out in sympathy for the grief of Achilles for his slain companion Patroclus.
- Doris or Oris, one the possible mothers by Poseidon of the Argonaut Euphemus. In some accounts, the latter's mother was variously named as (1) Europe, daughter of the giant Tityos; (2) Mecionice, daughter of either Eurotas (mythology) or Orion or (4) lastly, Macionassa.
