= Calliphaea =

Greek mythological character; Ionides nymph

In Greek mythology, Calliphaea or Kalliphaeia (Ancient Greek: Καλλιφάεια, romanized: Kallipháeia, lit. 'fair-shining' or 'beautiful light') was one of the Ionides nymphs whose spring waters were believed to cure diseases. She was an Elean naiad-daughter of the river-god Cytherus and sister to Synallasis, Pegaea and Iasis.

== Nymphs ==
In Greek mythology, nymphs are a group of lower class female divinities. Nymphs are often associated with fertility, water, or growing things like trees. They are not immortal but they do live for a very long time.

There are many different types of nymphs. Oceanids (sea nymphs), Nereids (lives in both saltwater and freshwater), Naiads (live in springs, rivers and lakes), Oreads (live in mountains and grottoes), Napaeae and Alseids (nymphs of glens and groves), and the Dryads, also known as the hamadryads ( live in forests and trees)

== Naiads ==
Naiads in Greek mythology are one of the many nymphs, also known as the :nymph of flowing water" They live in springs, rivers, fountains and lakes. Naiads are represented as "beautiful, lighthearted and beneficent." Calliphaea is a naiad, along with her three sisters, Synallasis, Pegaea and Iasis.

== Notes ==
- Pausanias, Description of Greece with an English Translation by W.H.S. Jones, Litt.D., and H.A. Ormerod, M.A., in 4 Volumes. Cambridge, MA, Harvard University Press; London, William Heinemann Ltd. 1918. ISBN 0-674-99328-4. Online version at the Perseus Digital Library
- Pausanias, Graeciae Descriptio. 3 vols. Leipzig, Teubner. 1903. Greek text available at the Perseus Digital Library.
