= Kytheros =

Kytheros or Cytherus may refer to:

- Kytheros, a River-God of ancient Elis in West Peloponnesos
- Kytheros (deme), an ancient Athenian deme

== See also ==
- Kythera
