= Amphissus =

Son of Apollo in Greek mythology

In Greek mythology, Amphissus (Ancient Greek: Ἄμφίσσος) was the son of Apollo and Dryope. According to Ovid, he is the son of Andraemon and Dryope. Amphissus eventually built a temple to his father in the city he founded, Amphissa.

== Mythology ==
Apollo found Dryope tending her sheep on a mountainside while she was being accompanied by the hamadryads. The god hid behind a tree and watched her, and later on, he disguised himself as a turtle in order for him to get closer to her. Dryope claimed the turtle as hers. Then, to scare away the hamadryads, Apollo turned into a snake, causing dryope to faint. When she awoke, she was in the arms of a god. This is how she came with the child, Amphissus.

According to Ovid, his mother Dryope picked a lotus for him, which turned out to be a nymph. Angry, the nymph cursed Dryope and turned her into a lotus tree.
