= Pegaea (mythology) =

Mythological Elean nymph

In Greek mythology, Pegaea or Pegaia (Ancient Greek: Πηγαία, romanized: Pēgaía or Pêgaia, lit. 'from a spring') was one of the Ionides nymphs whose spring waters were believed to cure diseases. She was an Elean naiad, daughter of the river-god Cytherus and sister to Synallasis, Calliphaea and Iasis.
