= Saon (mythology) =

Various mythological characters

In Greek mythology, the name Saon (Ancient Greek: Σάων) may refer to:

- Saon of Samothrace, also called Samon (Σάμων) or Saos (Σάος), son of either Zeus and an unnamed nymph (Nymphe) or of Hermes and Rhene. He was believed to have unified all the inhabitants of the island, who had previously lived in scattered settlements, into one people, which he further subdivided into five tribes named after his sons. He was also said to have established laws for the newly formed people.
- Saon of Acraephnium, of whom the following story is related by Pausanias. When Boeotia was struck by a lasting drought, each of its cities sent delegates to Delphi to inquire of a possible remedy; the Pythia in her turn directed them to the oracle of Trophonius in Lebadea. The delegates could not find the oracle until Saon, the oldest of the Acraephnian envoys, noticed a swarm of bees and understood that he should follow it. At once he saw the bees flying into the ground, right where the oracle was.
