= Rhene (mythology) =

In Greek mythology, Rhene (Ancient Greek: Ῥήνη) may refer to the following personages:

- Rhene, a nymph of Mount Cyllene. She was the lover of Hermes and mother by him of Saon (Saos or Samon), the first king of Samothrace. Otherwise, the parentage of this eponymous ruler of the island was attributed to Zeus and the nymph Nymphe.
- Rhene, also a nymph who was a paramour of Oileus and mother of his son Medon, although some suggest that Oileus fathered Medon with Alcimache. In one source, Rhene is given as the mother of Oileus' another son, Ajax the Lesser, as well, though the latter is more commonly said to be the son of Oileus' legitimate wife Eriopis.
