= Alseid =

Nymphs of groves

In Greek mythology, Alseids (/ælˈsiːɪdz/; Ancient Greek: Ἀλσηΐδες, romanized: Alsēḯdes) were nymphs who inhabited groves.

They are mentioned by Apollonius of Rhodes, who relates that the woman Cleite hangs herself after the death of her husband, Cyzicus, who was killed by the hero Jason. Upon her suicide:

Even the woodland nymphs themselves lamented her death, and from all the tears they shed for her from their eyes to the ground, the goddesses made a spring, which they call Cleite, the famous name of the unfortunate bride.

A scholium on the Iliad (from the A family of scholia) states explicitly that "Alseids" is the name given to nymphs who occupy groves.
