= Spartaeus (mythology) =

In Greek mythology, Spartaeus (Ancient Greek: Σπαρταῖος Spartaios) was the son of the Rhodian nymph Himalia and Zeus. He was the brother of Cronius and Cytus.

== Mythology ==
When Spartaeus and his brothers were still young men, Aphrodite travelling from Cythera to Cyprus, dropped near Rhodes but was prevented by the sons of Poseidon and Halia. Thus, the goddess cursed them with insanity.

Jennifer Larson observes that the dictionary compiler Hesychius of Alexandria gives ίμαλιά. denoting an abundance of wheat meal, and notes the agricultural connotations of the sons' names: "Spartaios recalls sowing, and Kytos means a basket or jar. Kronios denotes a descendant of Kronos, the god of the Golden Age", a mythic time of ease and abundance.
