= Brettia =

Greek mythological nymph

In Greek mythology, Brettia (Ancient Greek: Βρεττίας) was the eponymous nymph of Abrettene, Mysia.
