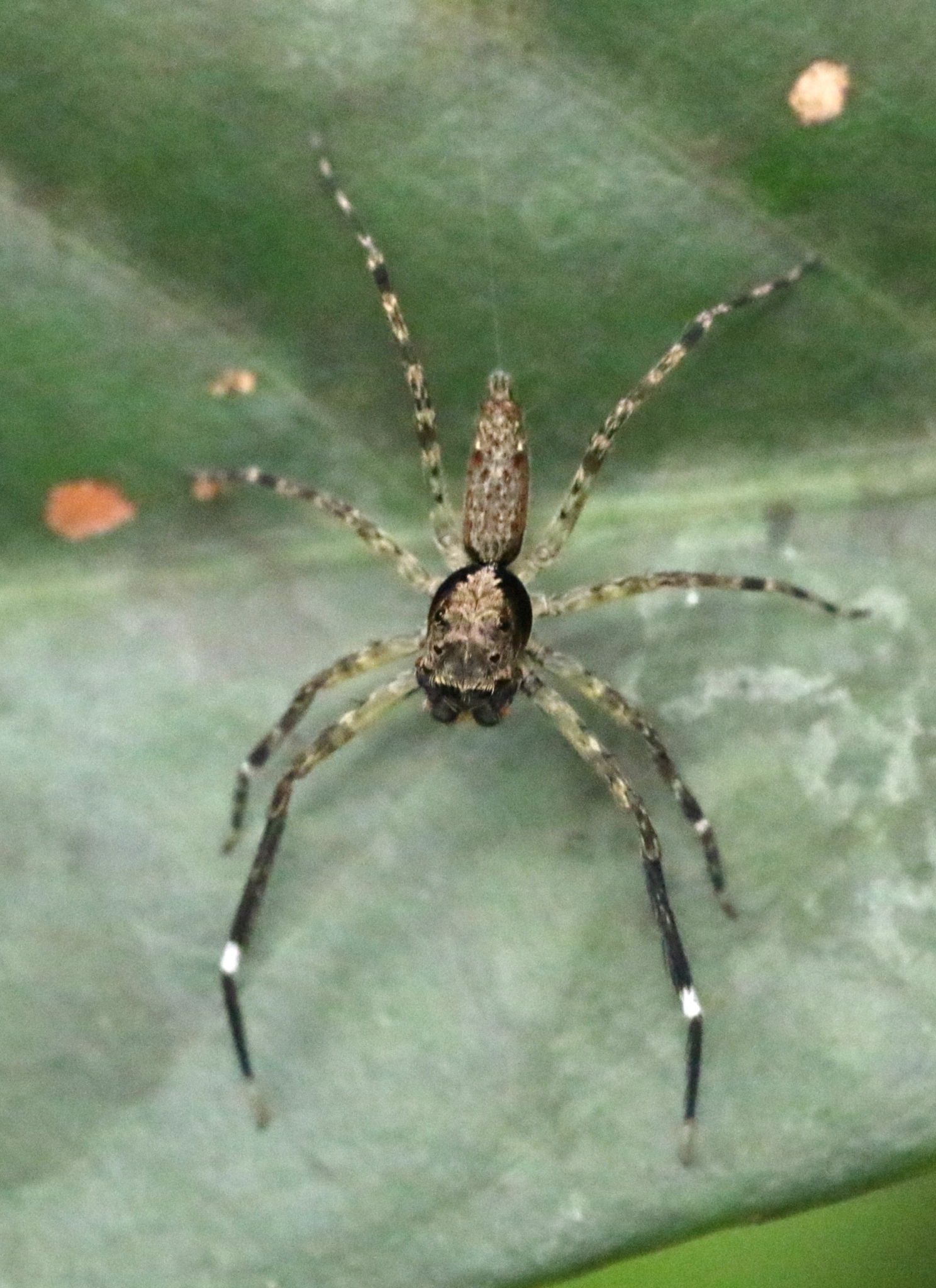
- S. zhangi from Hong Kong

Scientific classification
- Kingdom: Animalia
- Phylum: Arthropoda
- Subphylum: Chelicerata
- Class: Arachnida
- Order: Araneae
- Infraorder: Araneomorphae
- Family: Salticidae
- Genus: Spartaeus
- Species: S. zhangi

Binomial name
- Spartaeus zhangi Peng & Li, 2002

= Spartaeus zhangi =

Species of spider

Spartaeus zhangi is a species of jumping spider in the genus Spartaeus. It is found in China and Laos.

== Etymology ==
The species is named in honor of Mr. Zhang Guo-Qing, who collected the type specimens.

== Distribution ==
S. zhangi has been recorded from China (Guangxi Zhuang Autonomous Region) and several localities in Laos. The holotype was collected from Jinzhong highway, Jinxiu County in Guangxi.

== Description ==
Spartaeus zhangi is most similar to Spartaeus thailandicus but can be distinguished by several morphological features in males. The species shows sexual dimorphism in size and coloration.

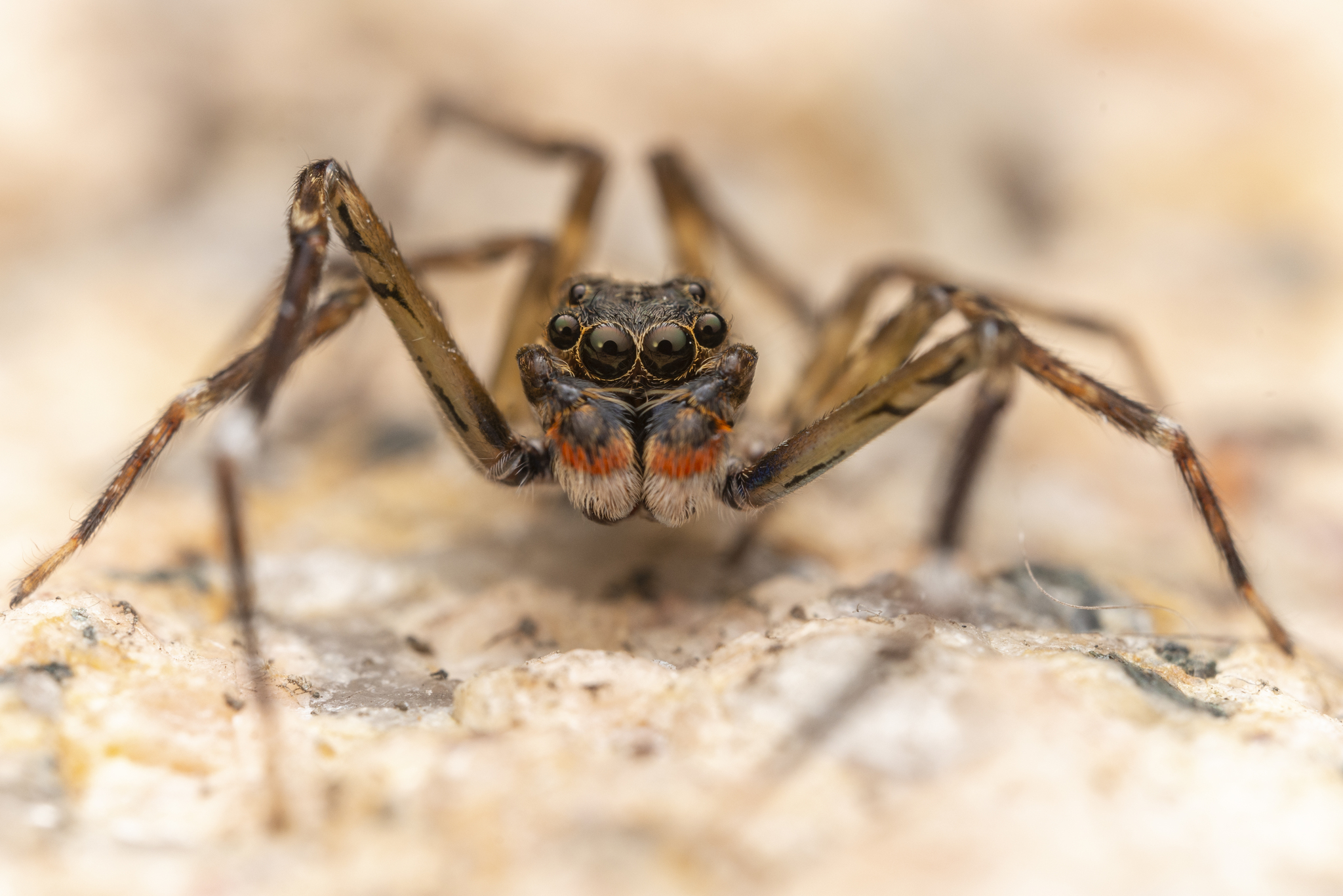
S. zhangi from Hong Kong

=== Males ===
Males have a total length of 5.00–6.90 mm. The carapace is dark brown with black brown lateral sides, eye bases, and ocular area margins. The ocular area is clothed with dense brown hair, while the carapace margin has white long hair. The sternum is yellowish brown with a dark brown margin and features a large gray mark surrounded by radial lines.

The chelicerae are long and stout with a dark brown front side marked by longitudinal black lines. They possess eight promarginal teeth and twelve retromarginal denticles. The legs are long and thin, light brown to brown with long spines and hair, with the first and second pairs showing black lines and patches on the coxae, trochanters, and femora.

The abdomen is cylindrical with a light gray dorsum and grayish brown sides. A distinctive cardiac pattern appears as a long bar-shaped, dark gray marking, with three dark gray herring-bone patterns on the posterior median area. The ventral side is grayish black with light grayish white longitudinal bands on each side.

=== Females ===
Females are slightly smaller with better marked ridges on the copulatory orifices compared to S. thailandicus. The female was first described by Logunov & Azarkina in 2008.

== Habitat ==
The species has been found in limestone cave environments and at elevations around 180-373 meters above sea level in Laos.
