= Alchanus =

In Greek mythology, Alchanus was the son of the nymph Charidia and Zeus, king of the gods.
