= Brisa (mythology) =

Set index article on Greek mythology

In Greek mythology, Brisa (Ancient Greek: Βρῖσα or Βρίσα) may refer to the following characters:

Female

- Brisa, a nymph who served as a nurse and educator of Dionysus, from whom the god derived his epithet Brisaeus (meaning "of Brisa" or associated with the grape-harvest).

Male

- Brisa, another name for Briseus, the priest of Lyrnessus and father of Briseis.
