= Spartaeus ellipticus =

Scientific classification
- Kingdom: Animalia
- Phylum: Arthropoda
- Subphylum: Chelicerata
- Class: Arachnida
- Order: Araneae
- Infraorder: Araneomorphae
- Family: Salticidae
- Genus: Spartaeus
- Species: S. ellipticus

Binomial name
- Spartaeus ellipticus Bao & Peng, 2002

Species of spider

Spartaeus ellipticus is a species of jumping spiders found only in Taiwan. It has a total length (excluding legs) of nearly 6 mm. The carapace is dark brown with paler markings towards the rear and a black margin. The whole carapace is densely covered with white hair. The legs are brown with many large, prominent spines. The oval abdomen is greyish brown marked overall with small dark patches.

This species is most similar to Spartaea thailandica but is much smaller with diagnostic differences in the configuration of spines on the first pair of legs and in the genitalia.
