= Calliste (mythology) =

Mythological nymph

In Greek mythology, Calliste or Callistis (Ancient Greek: Καλλίστη, romanized: Kallístē, lit. 'the most beautiful') is the daughter of the sea-god Triton and the Libya of Egypt, who was given to the Argonauts as a clod of earth that transformed into the island Calliste.

== Mythology ==
As the Argonauts sailed off the coast of Colchis after having taken the Golden Fleece, Triton appeared to them in the form of a young, wealthy man and introduced himself as Eurypylus, the son of Poseidon. He offered them a clod of earth which one of the crew, Euphemus, accepted, as a token of friendship. Later Euphemus dreamt that he was breastfeeding from the clod, which grew to be a young woman. He then laid with her, but felt guilty afterwards, for she had been a virgin and he had nursed her. But the woman, introducing herself as Calliste, daughter of Triton and Libya, told him not to worry, and asked him to give her a home with the Nereids near the island of Anaphe.

When he woke up, Euphemus went to Jason and recounted his dream. Jason in turn told Euphemus about an oracle he had received from Apollo. Apollo had told him that once he came into the possession of a clod of earth, should he throw it into the sea, the gods would be sure to make an island out of it. Euphemus, hearing that, tossed the clod in the water, and an island, named Calliste (now known as Santorini), sprang from it. Euphemus' descendants would settle on the island.

== See also ==
- Perimele
- Asteria

== Bibliography ==
- Apollonius Rhodius, Argonautica translated by Robert Cooper Seaton (1853–1915), R. C. Loeb Classical Library Volume 001. London, William Heinemann Ltd, 1912.
- Pindar, The Odes of Pindar including the Principal Fragments with an Introduction and an English Translation by Sir John Sandys, Litt.D., FBA. Cambridge, MA., Harvard University Press; London, William Heinemann Ltd. 1937. Greek text available at the Perseus Digital Library.
