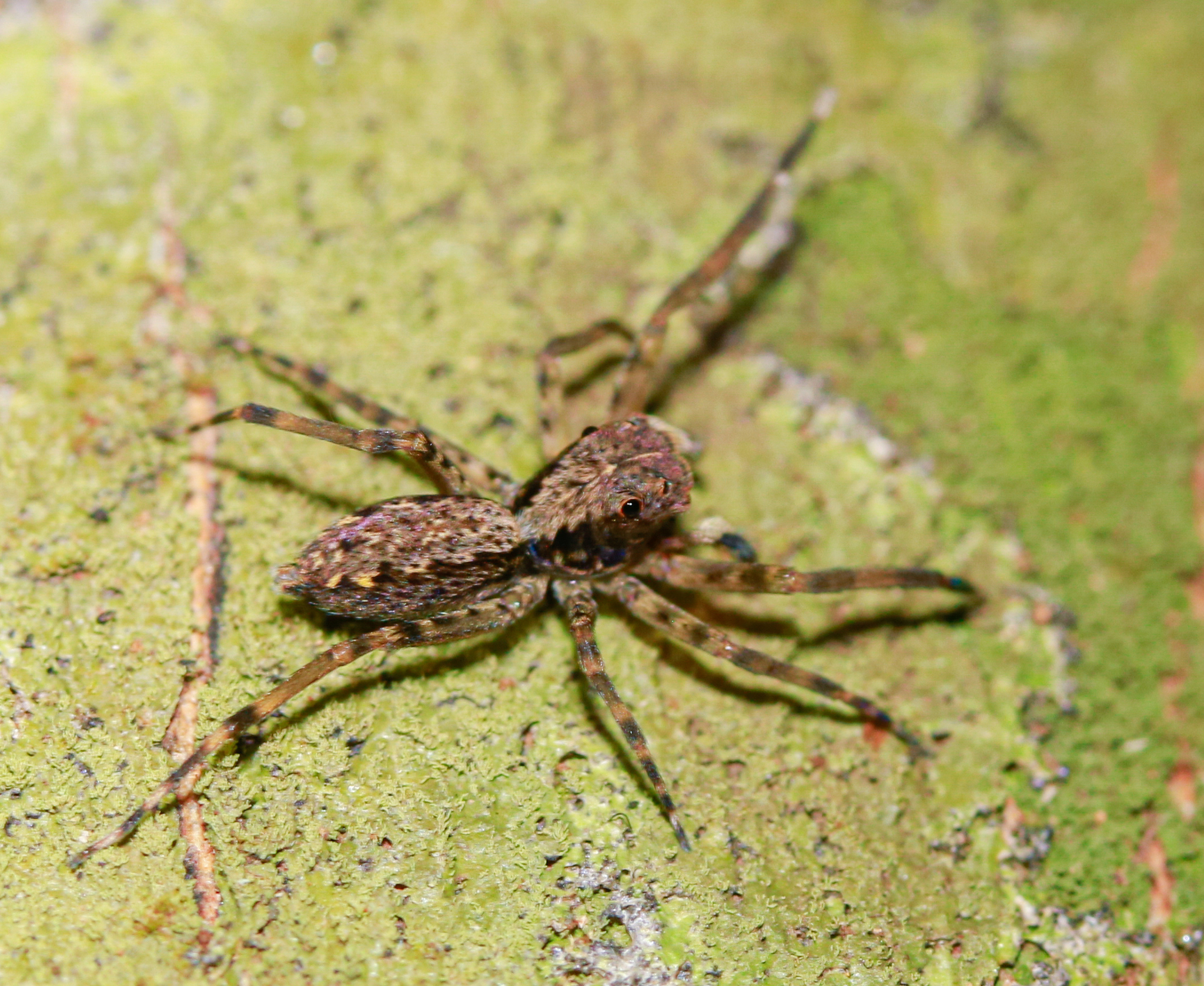
- S. spinimanus from Thailand

Scientific classification
- Kingdom: Animalia
- Phylum: Arthropoda
- Subphylum: Chelicerata
- Class: Arachnida
- Order: Araneae
- Infraorder: Araneomorphae
- Family: Salticidae
- Genus: Spartaeus
- Species: S. spinimanus

Binomial name
- Spartaeus spinimanus (Thorell, 1878)

Synonyms
- Boethus spinimanus Thorell, 1878; Spartaeus gracilis Thorell, 1891; Nealces caligatus Simon, 1900; Nealces striatipes Simon, 1900; Boethus striatipes (Simon, 1900); Boethus caligatus (Simon, 1900); Boethus gracilis (Thorell, 1891); Boethuola spinimana Strand, 1929

= Spartaeus spinimanus =

Spiny-legged jumper

Species of jumping spider

Spartaeus spinimanus, the spiny-legged jumper, is a species of jumping spider in the family Salticidae. It is found across Southeast Asia, including Sri Lanka, Singapore, Malaysia, and Indonesia.

Their most preferred prey is moths. Unusual for jumping spider, S. spinimanus builds large sheet webs on tree trunks to capture them.

== Etymology ==
The specific name spinimanus is derived from Latin spina (spine) and manus (hand), referring to the distinctive spination on the legs that characterizes this species.

== Taxonomy ==
Spartaeus spinimanus was originally described by Tamerlan Thorell in 1878 as Boethus spinimanus based on a juvenile specimen from Amboina. The species has a complex taxonomic history, with several related forms initially described as separate species. In 1984, Fred Wanless comprehensively reviewed the genus and synonymized several species with S. spinimanus, transferring it from the genus Boethus to Spartaeus.

The species serves as the type species for the genus Spartaeus.

== Distribution ==
S. spinimanus has been recorded from Sri Lanka, Singapore, Malaysia (Sarawak, Borneo), and Indonesia (Sumatra, Java, Ambon).

== Description ==
Spartaeus spinimanus is a medium-sized jumping spider with notable sexual dimorphism in size and coloration.

=== Male ===
Males have a total body length of 4.2–5.8 mm, with the carapace measuring 2.0–2.5 mm in length. The carapace is light brown with blackish mottling on the sides and a central tapering yellow-brown band on the thoracic region. The body is clothed in recumbent brown and whitish hairs that appear shiny under certain lighting conditions.

The eyes are surrounded by black borders and fringed with whitish hairs. The clypeus is thinly clothed in light brown and whitish hairs. The chelicerae are yellow-brown with sooty markings and scattered fine brown hairs.

The abdomen is yellow-brown with blackish lateral mottling, covered in fine recumbent pale brown and iridescent lanceolate hairs with testaceous patches on the underside. The legs are long and slender with numerous spines, particularly prominent on the first pair of legs. The first pair of legs features distinctive yellow coloration with black lateral stripes.

=== Female ===
Females are larger than males, with a total body length of 5.4–6.3 mm and carapace length of 2.38–2.5 mm. They share similar coloration patterns to males but with more clearly defined markings. The chelicerae are more robust than in males, being orange-brown with sooty markings and more substantial teeth arrangement.

The abdomen in females is pale yellow clothed in creamy white hairs with sooty markings above and blackish mottling on the sides. The legs and spines are more robust than in males, with the first pair of legs being pale yellow with sooty metatarsi.

=== Distinguishing features ===
S. spinimanus can be distinguished from the closely related S. thailandica by the presence of median epigynal guides in females. The species is easily recognized by its distinctive leg spination pattern and characteristic coloration.

== Habitat ==
Specimens have been collected from various habitats including houses and buildings, suggesting the species is somewhat synanthropic.
