= Aora (mythology) =

Greek mythological nympth

In Greek mythology, Aora (Ancient Greek: Ἀώρα) was a nymph by whom the town of Aoros in Crete was named after. Aristocrats from the town of Eleutherna claimed descent from Aora and her husband Eleuther, one of the Kouretes.
