= Menodice =

Daughter of Orion in the Fabulae

In the Fabulae by Hyginus, Menodice or Menodike (Ancient Greek: Μηνοδίκη, romanized: Mēnodíkē) is a nymph daughter of Orion. She is the mother of Hylas by King Theiodamas of the Dryopians.
