= Nymphe (mythology) =

In Greek mythology, Nymphe (Ancient Greek: Νύμφη, romanized: Nymphê, lit. 'bath') refers to the following characters:

- Nymphe, one of the twelve lesser known Horae (Hours).
- Nymphe, the nymph mother, by Zeus, of Saon (Samon), the first king of Samothrace. Otherwise, the parentage of this eponymous ruler of the island was attributed to Hermes and the nymph Rhene.
- Nymphe, listed as one of the Maenads, female followers of Dionysus, according to various vase paintings.
