= Hylas =

Young companion to Heracles

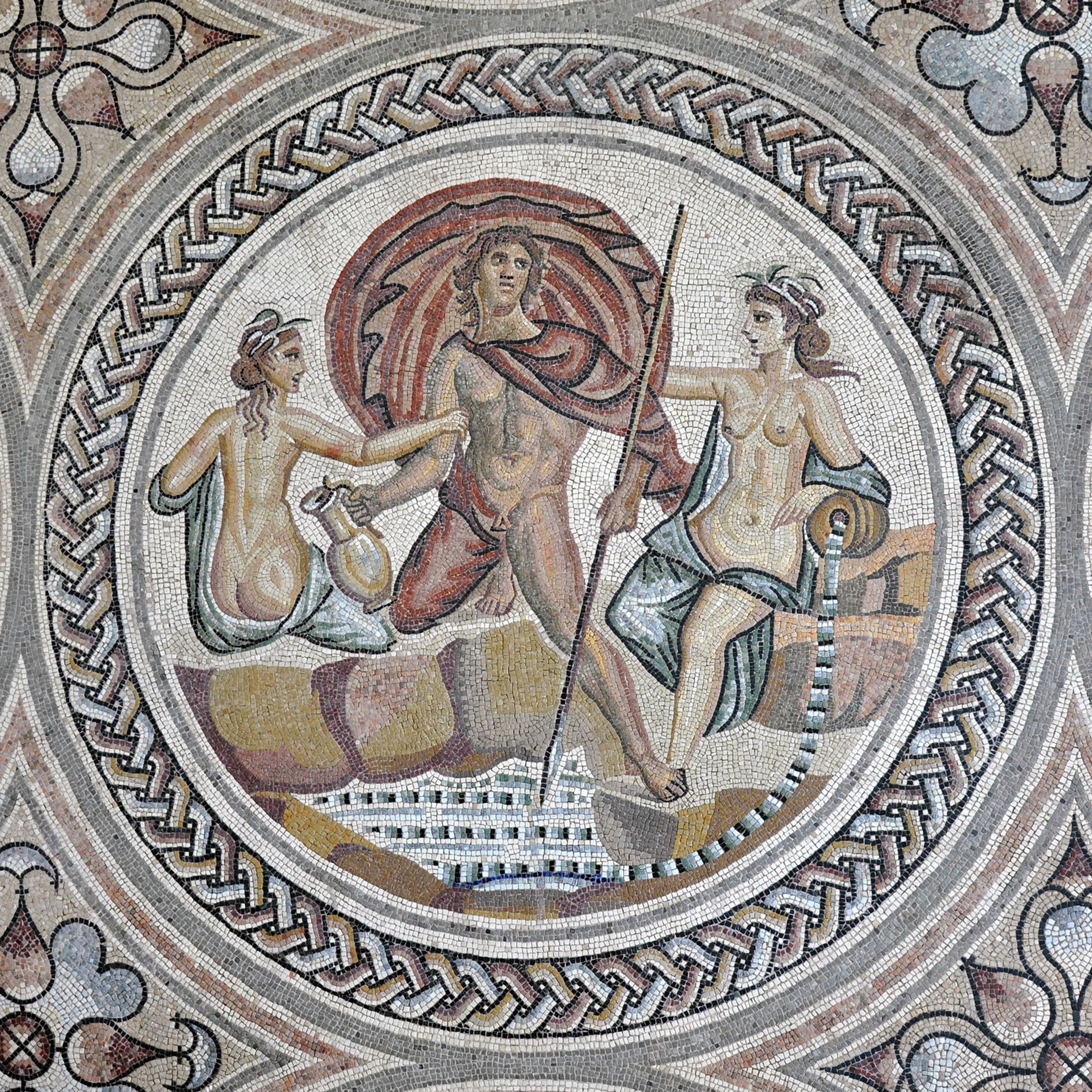
Hylas and nymphs from a mosaic in Roman Gaul (3rd century)

In classical mythology, Hylas (Ancient Greek: Ὕλας, romanized: Húlas) was a youth who served Heracles (Roman Hercules) as companion and servant. His abduction by water nymphs was a theme of ancient art, and has been an enduring subject for Western art in the classical tradition.

== Genealogy ==
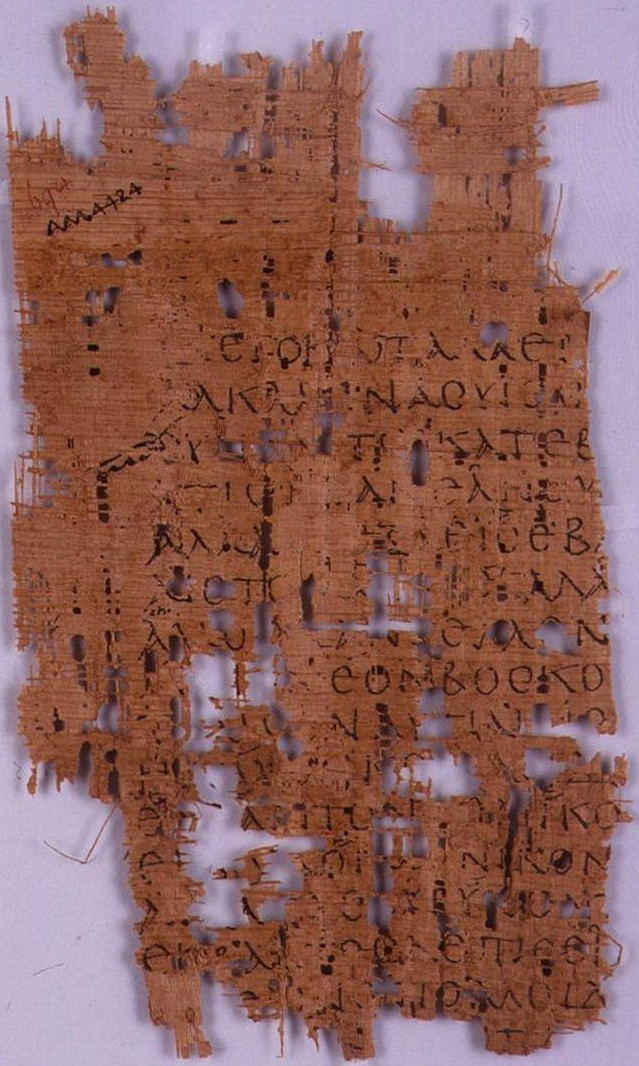
Theocritus’s Idyll 13, a poem of circa 300 BC devoted to Hylas. P. Oxy. 694, 2nd century AD.

In Greek mythology, Hylas was the son of King Theiodamas of the Dryopians and the nymph Menodice, daughter of Orion. In some accounts, his father was Heracles, Euphemus or King Ceyx of Trachis.

== Mythology ==
=== Heracles ===
After Heracles killed Theiodamas in battle, he took on Hylas as his arms-bearer and taught him to be a warrior. The poet Theocritus (about 300 BC) wrote about the love between Heracles and Hylas:

"We are not the first mortals to see beauty in what is beautiful. No, even Amphitryon's bronze-hearted son, who defeated the savage Nemean lion, loved a boy—charming Hylas, whose hair hung down in curls. And like a father with a dear son, he taught him all the things which had made him a mighty man, and famous."

=== Argonauts ===
Heracles took Hylas with him on the Argo, thus making him one of the Argonauts. Hylas was kidnapped by Naiads of the spring of Pegae in Mysia when they fell in love with him, and he vanished into the water with a cry. His disappearance greatly upset Heracles, who, along with Polyphemus, searched for him for a great length of time. The ship soon set sail without them. According to the Latin Argonautica of Valerius Flaccus, they never found Hylas because the latter had fallen in love with the nymphs and remained "to share their power and their love". In the version told by Apollonios Rhodios, the sea-god Glaucus informs the Argonauts that "a nymph has lost her heart to him and made him her husband". Theocritus, on the other hand, has the nymphs shutting his mouth underwater to stifle his screams for Heracles. Antoninus Liberalis says that the nymphs changed him into an echo which again and again echoed back the cries of Heracles.

After the events of the Argonautica, one of the Argonauts named Cius (or Polyphemus according to Apollonius of Rhodes) returned to the place where the nymphs had taken away Hylas, and established there the city of Cius, later to be renamed to Prusias by Prusias I. According to the Roman-era Greek geographer Strabo:

And still to this day a kind of festival is celebrated among the Prusians, a mountain-ranging festival, in which they march in procession and call Hylas, as though making their exodus to the forests in quest of him.

== Literature ==
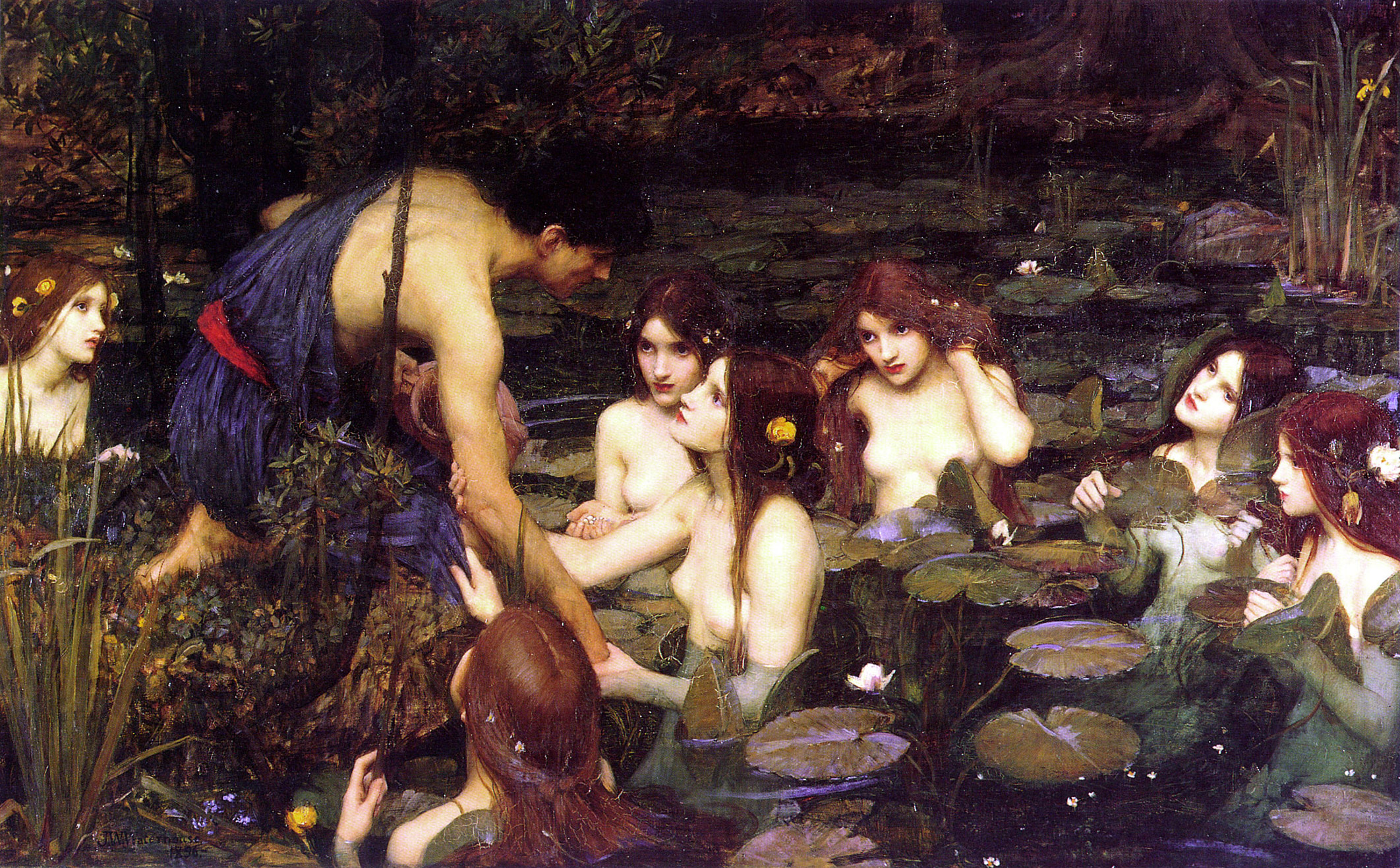
Hylas and the Nymphs (1896) by John William Waterhouse

The story of Hylas and the nymphs is alluded to in Book 3 of Edmund Spenser's The Faerie Queene, Canto XII, Stanza 7:

Or that same daintie lad, which was so deare
To great Alcides, that when as he dyde
He wailed womanlike with many a teare,
And every wood, and every valley wyde
He fild with Hylas name; the Nymphes eke "Hylas" cryde.

Hylas is also mentioned in Christopher Marlowe's play Edward II: "Not Hylas was more mourned for of Hercules / Than thou hast been of me since thy exile" (Act I, Scene I, line 142-3).

Oscar Wilde mentions Hylas at least six times in his published works. In The Picture of Dorian Gray, Chapter 11: "...and gilded a boy that he might serve at the feast as Ganymede or Hylas." In his sonnet, Santa Decca, lamenting the death of gods: "Young Hylas seeks the water-springs no more;" In The Garden of Eros: "There are the flowers which mourning Herakles / Strewed on the tomb of Hylas". In Charmides:

Some woodmen saw him lying by the stream
And marvelled much that any lad so beautiful could seem,

Nor deemed him born of mortals, and one said,
‘It is young Hylas, that false runaway
Who with a Naiad now would make his bed
Forgetting Herakles,’

In Canzonet:

Hylas is dead,
Nor will he e’er divine
Those little red
Rose-petalled lips of thine.

In Ravenna:

Long time I watched, and surely hoped to see
Some goat-foot Pan ...
Or Hylas mirrored in the perfect stream.

And in "De Profundis" Wilde wrote (to Lord Alfred Douglas), "I compare you to Hylas, or Hyacinth, Jonquil or Narcisse, or someone whom the great god of Poetry favoured, and honoured with his love."

Hylas is referred to in Chapter 18 of Charles Kingsley's novel Hypatia, when the Prefect Orontes, rescued by the Goths, is taken for safety into a house largely populated by women, and fancies himself as "A second Hylas".

"Hylas" is a poem by Madison Cawein, including the lines "Hylas, the Argonaut, the lad Beloved of Herakles, was I"

Hylas is the name of one of the two characters in George Berkeley's Three Dialogues between Hylas and Philonous. He represents the materialist position against which Berkeley (through Philonous) argues. In this context, the name is derived from ὕλη, the classical Greek word for "matter." Stanisław Lem adopted these characters in his 1957 non-fiction, philosophical book Dialogi (Dialogs).

Hylas is also mentioned in Thomas Hardy's Far from the Madding Crowd: "He called again: the valleys and farthest hills resounded as when the sailors invoked the lost Hylas on the Mysian shore; but no sheep."

== Cinema ==
Hylas is a character in Jason and the Argonauts (1963), played by John Cairney.

Hylas und die Nymphen (Switzerland, 2013) is an 11-minute short, based on the myth: "The body of a young man (Kai Albrecht) floats in a lily pond. Three young female suspects (Annina Euling, Lina Hoppe, Magdalena Neuhaus) are found and interrogated - the nymphs of our generation."

Hylas (USA, 2021) is a four-minute horror short with Benito Borjas-Fitzpatrick as Hylas and Dan O'Reilly as a Naiad.

== See also ==
- Iolaus
- Lympha
- Jason and the Argonauts
