= Dryops (eponym of the Dryopians) =

In Greek mythology, Dryops (/ˈdraɪ.ɒps/, Ancient Greek: Δρύοψ, romanized: Drúops, lit. 'man of oak') was the eponym of the Dryopians.

== Family ==
Dryops was the son of a river god either named as Spercheus or Peneus and the Danaid Polydora; or of Apollo by Dia, daughter of King Lycaon of Arcadia. As a newborn infant, he was concealed by Dia in a hollow oak-tree. He had one daughter, Dryope, and also a son Cragaleus.

== Reign ==
Dryops had been king of the Dryopes, who derived their name from him. The Asinaeans in Messenia worshipped him as their ancestral hero, and as a son of Apollo, and celebrated a festival in honour of him every other year. His heroum there was adorned with a very archaic statue of the hero. Dryops reigned in the neighborhood of Mount Oeta. The people, original inhabitants of the country from the valley of the Spercheius and Thermopylae, as far as Mount Parnassus. They retained the name after having transferred to Asine in Peloponnesus.
