= Theiodamas =

Mythological Greek characters

In Greek mythology, the name Theiodamas or Thiodamas (Ancient Greek: Θειοδάμας, romanized: Theiodámas, lit. 'subdued by the divine') may refer to:

- Theiodamas, king of the Dryopes, father of Hylas by the nymph Menodice, daughter of Orion. The Bibliotheca and Apollonius Rhodius relate of him that one day when he was working the land with a plough pulled by two bulls, he encountered Heracles. The latter, being short of food at the moment, slaughtered one of Theiodamas' bulls and consumed it. Theiodamas attempted to start a fight over the bull and was killed by Heracles. Apollonius Rhodius suggests that the incident was simply a pretext for Heracles to start a war against the unjust Dryopes; according to Apollodorus, Heracles did conquer the people in alliance with Ceyx of Trachis. In some accounts, Hylas' parentage was given as Euphemus or even King Ceyx of Trachis.
- Theiodamas, a seer, son of Melampus. He followed Adrastus in the war of the Seven against Thebes and was chosen to replace Amphiaraus, who had been swallowed up by the earth, and the leader of a night attack, proposed by him himself on divine inspiration, on sleeping Thebans surrounding the Argive camp after the latter's death.
- Theiodamas of Lydia, father of Dresaeus by the nymph Neaera. His son was a defender of Troy in the Trojan War and was killed by Polypoetes, son of Pirithous.
