= Dryope (daughter of Dryops) =

Daughter of Dryops or of Eurytus, mother of Amphissus

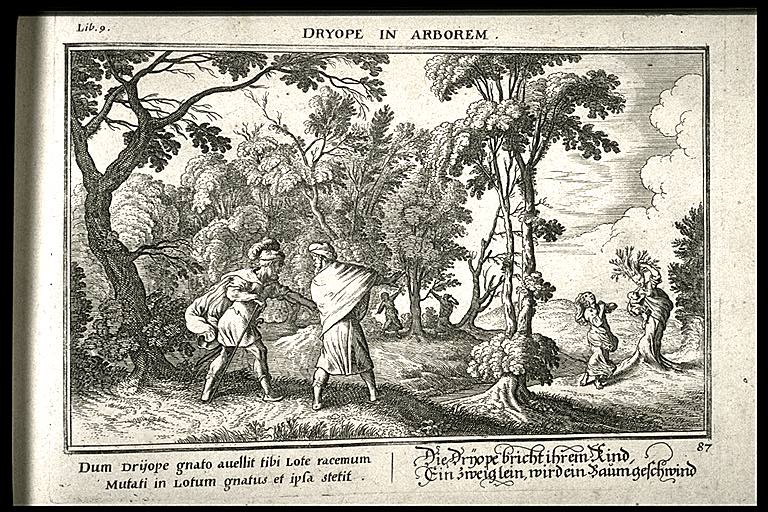
Dríope transformed into a lotus tree illustration extracted out of Ovid's Metamorphoses

In Greek mythology, Dryope (/ˈdraɪ.əpiː/; Ancient Greek: Δρυόπη) is the daughter of Dryops, king of Oeta ("oak-man") or of Eurytus (and hence half-sister to Iole). Dryope mothered Amphissus by Apollo.

== Mythology ==
There is a story of her metamorphosis into a black poplar, and a story of her changing into a lotus tree.

=== Antoninus Liberalis' account ===
According to the first, Apollo seduced her by a trick. While Dryope tended the flocks of her father on Mount Oeta, she became the playmate of the hamadryads of the woods on Mount Oeta. The nymphs taught her to sing hymns to the gods and to dance. On one occasion, Dryope was seen by Apollo. In order to win her favours the god turned himself into a tortoise, of which the girls made a pet. The nymphs played with the animal and when Dryope had the tortoise on her lap, Apollo turned into a snake. The nymphs then got scared and abandoned her, and Apollo raped her. Eventually she gave birth to her son Amphissus. Soon afterwards Dryope married Andraemon, son of Oxylus. Amphissus eventually built a temple to his father Apollo in the city of Oeta, which he founded. Here the nymphs came to converse with Dryope, who had become a priestess of the temple. Fond of her, they took her with them and placed a poplar tree in her place. They then turned her into a nymph. Two women of the town told the people that the nymphs had taken Dryope, so the nymphs turned them into fir trees.

=== Ovid's account ===
In Ovid's version of the story, Dryope was wandering by a lake, suckling her baby Amphissus, when she saw the bright red flowers of the lotus, formerly the nymph Lotis who, when fleeing from Priapus, had been changed into a tree. Dryope wanted to give the blossoms to her baby to play with, but when she picked one the tree started to tremble and bleed. She tried to run away, but the blood of the tree had touched her skin and she found her feet rooted to the spot. She slowly began to turn into a lotus tree, the bark spreading up her legs from the earth, but just before the woody stiffness finally reached her throat and as her arms began sprouting twigs her husband Andraemon heard her cries and came to her. She had just enough time to warn her husband to take care of their child and make sure that he did not pick flowers. She also told him to find Amphissus a nurse and to tell him to call her his mother.
