= Himalia (mythology) =

In Greek mythology Himalia (/hɪˈmeɪliə/; Ancient Greek: Ἱμαλία, romanized: Himalía, lit. 'miller's wife') was a nymph of the eastern end of the island of Rhodes.

== Mythology ==
According to Diodorus Siculus, after Zeus subdued the Titans, he became enamored with Himalia and mated with her in the form of a fertile rain. The latter produced three sons with him, Spartaeus, Cronius, and Cytus: no further information about them survives. During the flood that drowned the island of Rhodes, Himalia and the sons of Zeus were saved by taking refuge in the high places of the island.

Jennifer Larson observes that the dictionary compiler Hesychius of Alexandria gives ίμαλιά. denoting an abundance of wheat meal, and notes the agricultural connotations of the sons' names: "Spartaeus recalls sowing, and Cytus means a basket or jar. Cronius denotes a descendant of Cronus, the god of the Golden Age", a mythic time of ease and abundance.
