= Euphemus =

Son of Poseidon in Greek mythology

In Greek mythology, Euphemus (/juːˈfiːməs/; Ancient Greek: Εὔφημος, romanized: Eúphēmos, lit. 'reputable', 'well-spoken' or 'of good report', pronounced [eʊ̯́pʰɛːmos]) was counted among the Calydonian hunters and the Argonauts, and was connected with the legend of the foundation of Cyrene.

== Family ==
Euphemus was a son of Poseidon, granted by his father the power to walk on water. His mother is variously named: (1) Europe, daughter of the giant Tityos; (2) Doris (Oris), daughter of ?Europa (3) Mecionice, daughter of either Eurotas or Orion or (4) lastly, Macionassa. In some accounts, he is said to have been married to Laonome, sister of Heracles.

By a Lemnian woman Lamache (also Malicha or Malache), Euphemus became the father of Leucophanes.

== Mythology ==
Euphemus birthplace is given as "the banks of the Cephissus" by Pindar or Hyria in Boeotia by the Megalai Ehoiai, but his later residence was Taenarum in Laconia. Euphemus joined the voyage of the Argonauts, and served the crew as helmsman. He let a dove fly between the Symplegades to see if the ship would be able to pass as well.

Euphemus was mythologically linked to the Greek colonization of Libya and foundation of Cyrene. In Pindar's Pythian Ode 4, the myth of him as the ancestor of the colonizers is recounted in the form of a prophecy by Medea, and runs as follows. When the Argonauts stop by the lake Tritonis in Libya, they encounter Eurypylus, a son of Poseidon, who offers them a clod of earth as a sign of hospitality. Euphemus takes the clod with instructions to throw it on the ground beside the entrance to the Underworld at Taenarum by which his descendants in the fourth generation would then rule over Libya. The clod is accidentally washed overboard and carried to the island Thera, and Libya is colonized from that island by Battus of Thera, an alleged distant descendant of Euphemus (by 17 generations), who founds Cyrene.

The Argonautica by Apollonius Rhodius appears to follow a different version of the same myth: in the poem, when the Argonauts arrive near Lake Tritonis, Euphemus accepts the clod of earth from Triton who first introduces himself as Eurypylus but later reveals his true divine identity. Later, Euphemus has a dream of the clod producing drops of milk and then changing into a woman; in his dream, he has sex with the woman, and at the same time cries over her as if she were nursed by him; she then tells him that she is a daughter of Triton and Libya and the nurse of future children of Euphemus, and instructs him to entrust her to the care of the Nereids, promising that she would return in the future to provide a home for Euphemus' children. Euphemus consults Jason about this dream and, following his advice, throws the clod in the sea, whereupon it transforms into the island Calliste (Thera). The island is later colonized by the descendants of Euphemus who had previously been expelled from Lemnos and failed to find refuge in Sparta.

Euphemus was portrayed on the chest of Cypselus as the winner of the chariot race at the funeral games of Pelias.

== Bibliography ==
- Merkelbach, R.; West, M.L. (1967), Fragmenta Hesiodea, Oxford, ISBN 0-19-814171-8.
