= Ionides =

Nymphs of a healing spring

In Greek mythology, the Ionides (Ancient Greek: Ἰωνίδες) were a sisterhood of water nymphs. Their individual names were Calliphaea, Synallasis (or Synallaxis), Pegaea and Iasis.

== Mythology ==
The Ionides dwelt at Elis, where they had a sanctuary near a spring flowing into River Cytherus, and were said to have the power to cure various diseases. Their surname was thought to have come from the name of Ion, son of Gargettus.
