= Andraemon =

In Greek mythology the name Andraemon (/ænˈdriːmən/; Ancient Greek: Ἀνδραίμων, romanized: Andraímon) may refer to:

- Andraemon, son of Oxylus and husband of Dryope.
- Andraemon, possible father of another Oxylus.
- Andraemon, an Aetolian king and husband of Gorge of Calydon. By the latter, he became the father of Thoas. Andraemon succeeded his father-in-law Oeneus' power over Aetolia. He and his wife were buried in one tomb which was shown in the city of Amphissa.
- Andraemon, brother of Leonteus. He married Amphinome, a daughter of Pelias.
- Andraemon, one of the Suitors of Penelope who came from Dulichium along with either 56 other wooers (according to Apollodorus), or 51 (according to Homer). He, with the other suitors, was slain by Odysseus with the aid of Eumaeus, Philoetius, and Telemachus.
- Andraemon, a son of King Codrus. He participated in the colonization of Asia Minor and drove the Carians out of the city of Lebedus. His tomb was shown near Colophon. Mimnermus related that Andraemon was a native of Pylos and founder of Colophon.

Similarly Andraemonides was a patronymic, frequently used to refer to Thoas, son of Andraemon and Gorge.
