= Cytherus =

Coordinates: 37°54′28″N 23°59′03″E

Cytherus or Kytheros (Ancient Greek: Κύθηρρος or Κύθηρος), also known as Cytherum or Kytheron (Κύθηρον), was one of the twelve cities of ancient Attica, and afterwards a deme. Pausanias states that the nymphs of the river Cytherus in Elis were called Ionides from Ion, the son of Gargettus, when he migrated from Athens to Elis.

The site of Cytherus is located near modern Pousi Kaloyerou.
