= Dryopes =

Aboriginal tribe of ancient Greece

Dryopes (/ˈdraɪəpiːz/; Ancient Greek: Δρύοπες) or Dryopians (/draɪˈɒpiənz/) were one of the aboriginal tribes of ancient Greece. According to Herodotus, their earliest abode is said to have been on Mount Oeta in Central Greece and its adjacent valleys, in the district called after them, Dryopis (Δρυοπίς). The Dorians settled in that part of their country which lay between Oeta and Mount Parnassus, and which was afterwards called Doris; but Dryopis originally extended as far north as the river Spercheios. The name of Dryopis was still applied to the latter district in the time of Strabo, who calls it a tetrapolis, like Doris.

Heracles, in conjunction with the Malians, is said to have driven the Dryopes out of their country, and to have given it to the Dorians; whereupon the expelled Dryopes settled at Hermione and Asine in the Argolic peninsula, at Styrus and Carystus in Euboea, and in the islands of Cythnus and Cyprus. These are the six chief places in which the Dryopes are found in historical times. Later, Thucydides identifies Carystus as Dryopian, but nearby Styria as Ionian. Dicaearchus gives the name of Dryopis to the country around Ambracia, from which we might conclude that the Dryopes extended at one time from the Ambraciot Gulf to Mount Oeta and the Spercheios.

== See also ==
- Dryope
- Dryops
- Dryopida
