= Nymph =

Greek and Roman mythological creature

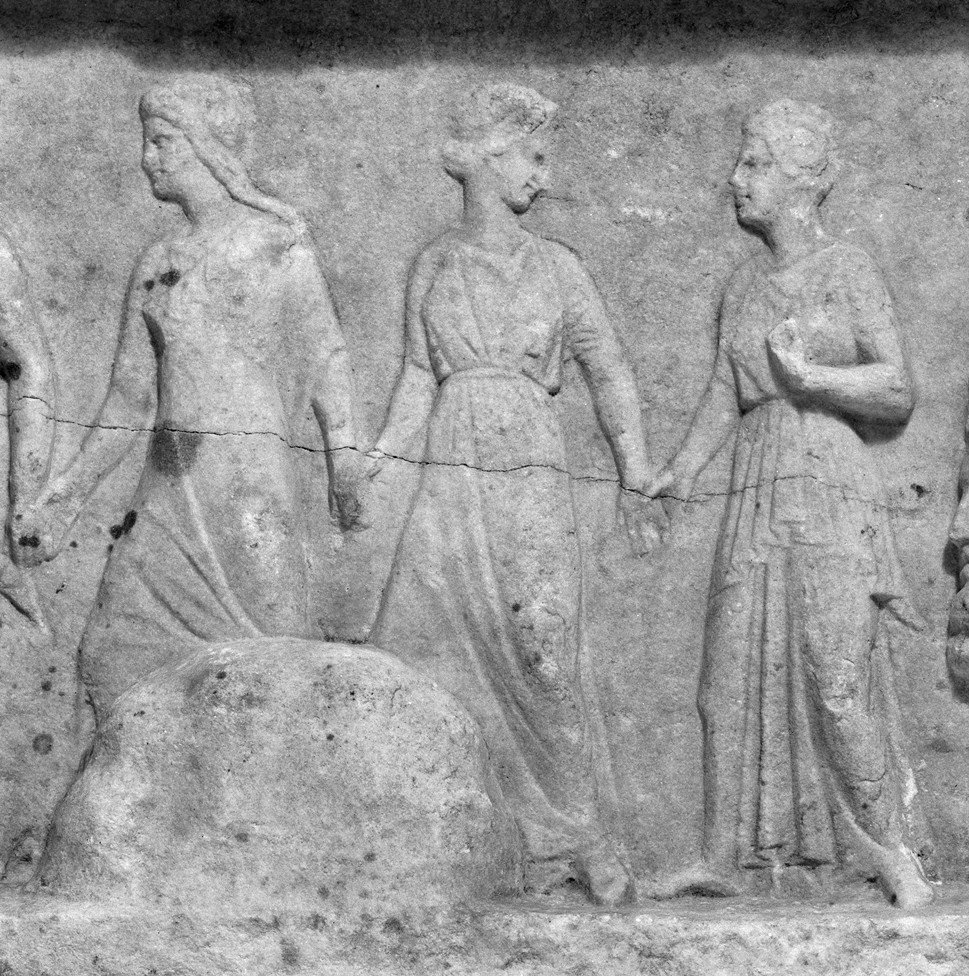
- Three nymphs, marble relief, c. 320–300 BC

Creature information
- Grouping: Mythological
- Sub grouping: Nature spirit
- Similar entities: Mermaid, hellois, huldra

Origin
- Country: Greece

A nymph (Ancient Greek: νύμφη, romanized: nýmphē; Attic Greek: [nýmpʰɛː]; sometimes spelled nymphe) is a minor female nature deity in ancient Greek folklore. Distinct from other Greek goddesses, nymphs are generally regarded as personifications of nature; they are typically tied to a specific place, landform, or tree, and are usually depicted as maidens. Because of their association with springs, they were often seen as having healing properties; other divine powers of the nymphs included divination and shapeshifting. In spite of their divine nature, they were not immortal.

Nymphs are divided into various broad subgroups based on their habitat, such as the Meliae (ash tree nymphs), the Dryads (oak tree nymphs), the Alseids (grove nymphs), the Naiads (spring nymphs), the Nereids (sea nymphs), the Oceanids (ocean nymphs), and the Oreads (mountain nymphs). Other nymphs included the Hesperides (evening nymphs), the Hyades (rain nymphs), the Heliades (poplar tree nymphs, daughters of Helios), and the Pleiades (companions of Artemis).

Nymphs featured in classic works of art, literature, and mythology. They are often attendants of goddesses and frequently occur in myths with a love motif, being the lovers of heroes and other deities. Desirable and promiscuous, nymphs can rarely be tamed, their dealings with mortals often marked by capricious aggression. Since the Middle Ages, nymphs have been sometimes popularly associated or even confused with fairies.

== Etymology ==
The Greek word nýmphē has the primary meaning of "young woman; bride, young wife" but is not usually associated with deities in particular. Yet the etymology of the noun nýmphē remains uncertain. The Doric and Aeolic (Homeric) form is nýmphā (νύμφα).

Modern usage more often applies to young women, contrasting with parthenos (παρθένος) "a virgin (of any age)", and generically as kore (κόρη < κόρϝα) "maiden, girl". The term is sometimes used by women to address each other and remains the regular Modern Greek term for "bride".

== Ancient Greek mythology ==
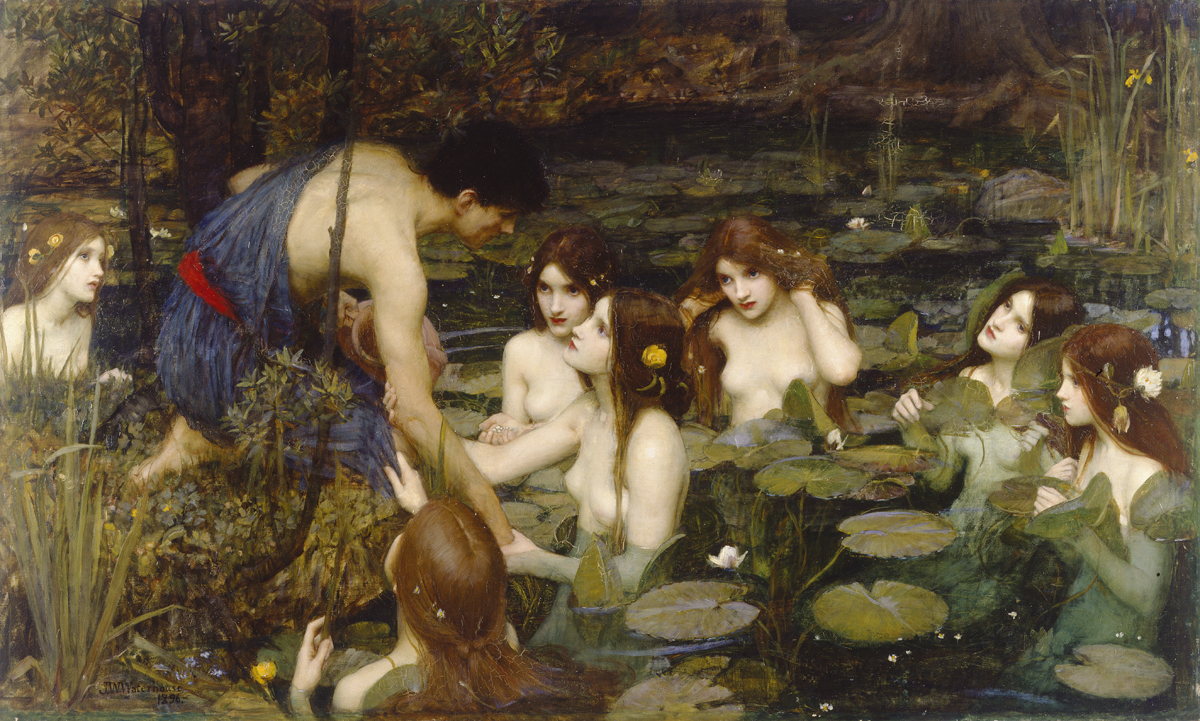
In this 1896 painting of Hylas and the Nymphs by John William Waterhouse, Hylas is abducted by the Naiads, i.e. fresh water nymphs

Nymphs often dwelt in specific areas related to the natural environment: e.g. mountainous regions; forests; springs. Other nymphs were part of the retinue of a god (such as Dionysus, Hermes, or Pan) or of a goddess (generally the huntress Artemis).

The Greek nymphs were also spirits invariably bound to places, not unlike the Latin genius loci, and sometimes this produced complicated myths like the cult of Arethusa to Sicily. In some of the works of the Greek-educated Latin poets, the nymphs gradually absorbed into their ranks the indigenous Italian divinities of springs and streams (Juturna, Egeria, Carmentis, Fontus) while the Lymphae (originally Lumpae), Italian water goddesses, owing to the accidental similarity of their names, could be identified with the Greek Nymphae. The classical mythologies of the Roman poets were unlikely to have affected the rites and cults of individual nymphs venerated by country people in the springs and clefts of Latium. Among the Roman literate class, their sphere of influence was restricted and they appear almost exclusively as divinities of the watery element.

== Greek folk religion ==
The ancient Greek belief in nymphs survived in many parts of the country into the early years of the twentieth century when they were usually known as "nereids". Nymphs often tended to frequent areas distant from humans but could be encountered by lone travelers outside the village, where their music might be heard, and the traveler could spy on their dancing or bathing in a stream or pool, either during the noon heat or in the middle of the night. They might appear in a whirlwind. Such encounters could be dangerous, bringing dumbness, besotted infatuation, madness or stroke to the unfortunate man. When parents believed their child to be nereid-struck, they would pray to the Saint Artemius (Perhaps this saint in particular being chosen is due to a corruption of the name of the goddess Artemis. If this is the case, it would be an example of "practical polytheism in the worship of the saints").

== Nymphs and fairies ==
Nymphs are often depicted in classic works across art, literature, mythology, and fiction. They are often associated with the medieval romances or Renaissance literature of the elusive fairies or elves.

== Sleeping nymph ==
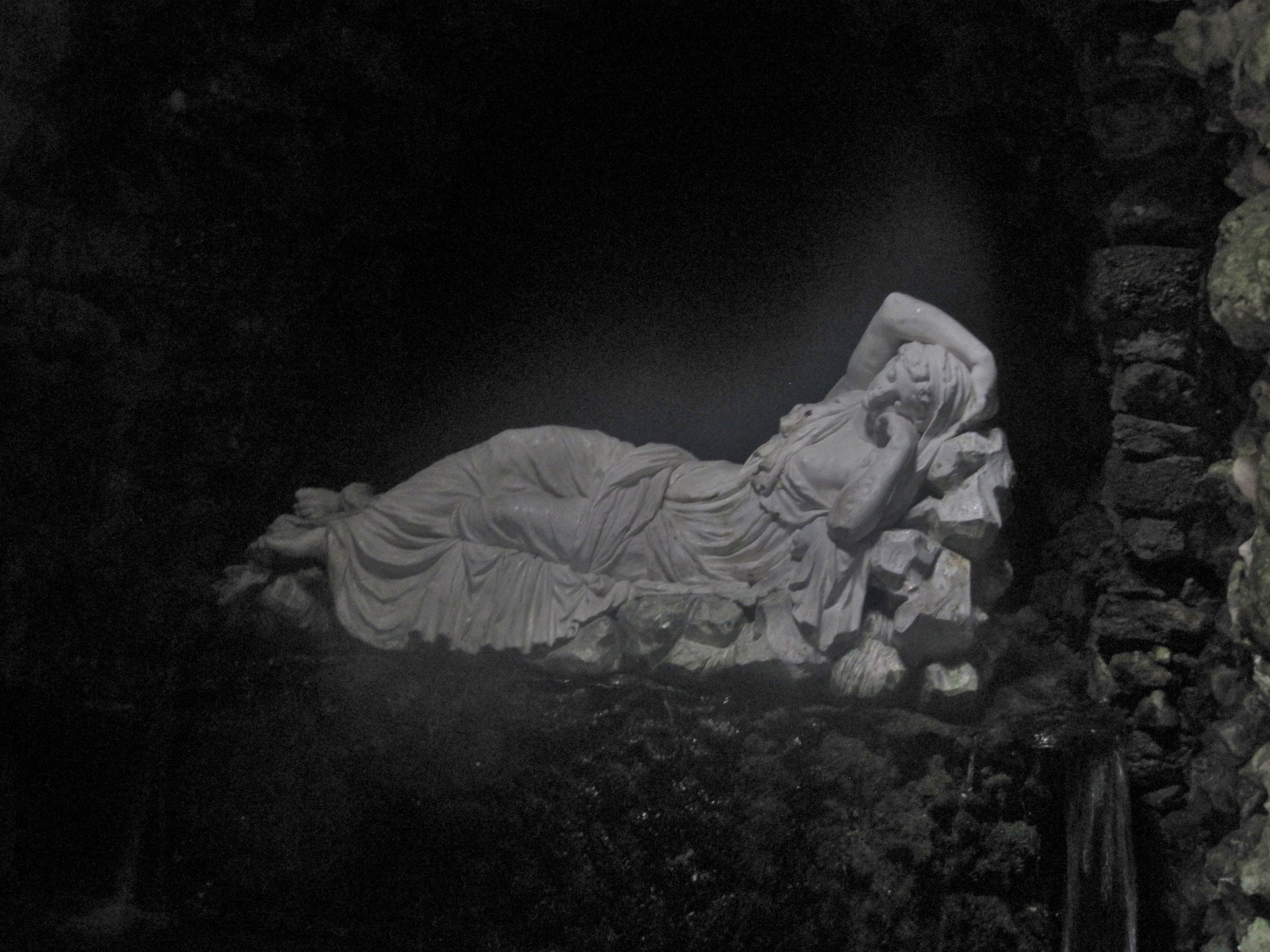
The statue of a sleeping nymph in a grotto at Stourhead gardens, England.

A motif that entered European art during the Renaissance was the idea of a statue of a nymph sleeping in a grotto or spring. This motif supposedly came from an Italian report of a Roman sculpture of a nymph at a fountain above the River Danube. The report, and an accompanying poem supposedly on the fountain describing the sleeping nymph, are now generally concluded to be a fifteenth-century forgery, but the motif proved influential among artists and landscape gardeners for several centuries after, with copies seen at neoclassical gardens such as the grotto at Stourhead.

== List ==
All the names for various classes of nymphs have plural feminine adjectives, most agreeing with the substantive numbers and groups of nymphai. There is no single adopted classification that could be seen as canonical and exhaustive. Some classes of nymphs tend to overlap, which complicates the task of precise classification. e.g. dryads and hamadryads as nymphs of trees generally, meliai as nymphs of ash trees. According to classicist Robin Hard, these terms "were hardly proper names at all, but feminine adjectives that could be assigned to the noun nymphē at will", adding that "[n]o orthodox or exhaustive classification of such beings was ever attempted, and ancient authors were often careless or arbitrary in the application of such titles".

=== By dwelling or affinity ===
Type / group / individuals	Location	Relations and notes
Celestial nymphs
Aurae (breezes)		also called Aetae or Pnoae, daughters of Boreas
Hesperides (evening)	City of Lixus (probably)	nymphs who tended the garden in which the golden apples of Hera grew.
• Aegle	City of Lixus (probably)	
• Arethusa	City of Lixus (probably)	
• Erytheia (or Eratheis)	City of Lixus (probably)	possibly mother of Eurytion by Ares
Hyades (star cluster; sent rain)	Boeotia (probably)	daughters of Atlas by either Pleione or Aethra
Pleiades	Boeotia (probably)	daughters of Atlas and Pleione; constellation; also were classed as Oreads
• Maia	Mount Cyllene, Arcadia	partner of Zeus and mother of Hermes
• Electra	Mount Saos, Samothrace	mother of Dardanus and Iasion by Zeus
• Taygete	Taygetos Mountains, Laconia	mother of Lacedaemon by Zeus
• Alcyone	Mount Cithaeron, Boeotia	mother of Hyperes and Anthas by Poseidon
• Celaeno	Mount Cithaeron, Boeotia or Euboea	mother of Lycus and Nycteus by Poseidon
• Asterope	Pisa, Elis	mother of Oenomaus by Ares
• Merope	Corinth	wife of Sisyphus and mother of Glaucus
Nephele (clouds)		daughters either of Oceanus or Tethys, or of Aither
Land nymphs
Alseides (groves)		
Auloniades (valleys, see also Napaeae)		
Leimonides (meadows)		
Napaeae (dells, see also Auloniades)		
Oreads (mountains, grottoes), also Orodemniades		
Wood and plant nymphs
Anthousai (flower nymphs)		
Dryades (trees)		
Hamadryades or Hadryades		
Daphnaiai (Δαφναίαι)		Nymphs associated with the laurel tree
Epimeliades or Epimelides (apple tree; also protected flocks)		other name variants include Meliades, Maliades and Hamameliades; same as these are also the Boucolai (Pastoral Nymphs)
Kissiae (ivy)		
• Oenone	India	mother of Melantheus, an Indian chief assisting Dionysus in the war against the Indians
Meliae (manna-ash tree)		born from the drops of blood that fell on Gaia when Cronus castrated Uranus
Hyleoroi (watchers of woods)		
Water nymphs (Hydriades or Ephydriades)
Haliae (sea and seashores)		
Nereids	Mediterranean Sea	50 daughters of Nereus and Doris
Naiads, Naides (fresh water)		
Krenaiai		Nymphs associated with springs
Limnades (lakes)		
Pegaeae (springs)		
Potameides (rivers)		
Oceanids		daughters of Oceanus and Tethys, any freshwater, typically clouds and rain. see List of Oceanids
Underworld nymphs
• Orphne	Hades	is a representation of the darkness of the river Styx, the river of hatred, but is not to be confused with the goddess Styx herself nor with Nyx, goddess of night, despite being associated with both. She is the consort of Acheron (the god of the river in Hades), and the mother of Ascalaphus (the orchardist of Hades).
• Leuce (white poplar tree)	Hades	daughter of Oceanus and lover of Hades
• Melinoe	Hades	Orphic nymph, daughter of Persephone and "Zeus disguised as Pluto". Her name is a possible epithet of Hecate.
• Minthe (mint)	Cocytus River	probably a daughter of Cocytus, lover of Hades and rival of Persephone
Other nymphs
Lampades		torch bearers in the retinue of Hecate
Hecaterides (rustic dance)		daughters of Hecaterus by a daughter of Phoroneus; sisters of the Dactyls and mothers of the Oreads and the Satyrs
Kabeirides		daughters of Cadmilus and sisters of the Kabeiroi or of Hephaestus and Cabeiro
Maenads or Bacchai or Bacchantes		frenzied nymphs in the retinue of Dionysus
Lenai (wine-press)		
Limnakides		translated by Vian as "marsh nymphs" (Nymphes des Marais); older editions render their name as Limnaioi or Leimakides
Mimallones (music)		
Thyiai or Thyiades (thyrsus bearers)		possibly a subgroup of, or a synonym for Maenads
Melissae (honey)		likely a subgroup of Oreades or Epimelides

=== By location ===
The following is a list of individual nymphs or groups thereof associated with this or that particular location. Nymphs in such groups could belong to any of the classes mentioned above (Naiades, Oreades, and so on).

Groups and Individuals	Location	Relations and Notes
Aeaean Nymphs	Aeaea Island	handmaidens of Circe
Aegaeides	Aegaeus River on the island of Scheria	
Aesepides	Aesepus River in Anatolia	
• Abarbarea	Aesepus River in Anatolia	
Acheloides	Achelous River in Acarnania	
• Callirhoe	Achelous River in Acarnania	second wife of Alcmaeon
Acmenes	Stadium in Olympia, Elis	
Amnisiades	Amnisos River on the island of Crete	entered the retinue of Artemis
Anigrides	Anigros River in Elis	believed to cure skin diseases
Argyra	Achaea	loved the sheperd Selemnus
Asopides	Asopus River in Sicyonia and Boeotia	
• Aegina	Island of Aegina	mother of Menoetius by Actor, and Aeacus by Zeus
• Asopis		
• Chalcis	Chalcis, Euboea	regarded as the mother of the Curetes and Corybantes; perhaps the same as Combe and Euboea
• Cleone	Cleonae, Argos	one of the daughters of Asopus
• Combe	Island of Euboea	consort of Socus and mother by him of the seven Corybantes
• Corcyra	Island of Corcyra	mother of Phaiax by Poseidon
• Euboea	Island of Euboea	abducted by Poseidon; perhaps the same as Chalcis and Combe above
• Harpina	Pisa, Elis	mother of Oenomaus by Ares
• Ismene	Ismenian spring of Thebes, Boeotia	wife of Argus, eponymous king of Argus and thus, mother of Argus Panoptes and Iasus.
• Nemea	Nemea, Argolis	others called her the daughter of Zeus and Selene
• Oeroe or Plataia	Plataea, Boeotia	carried off by Zeus
• Ornea	Ornia, Sicyon	
• Peirene	Corinth	others called her father to be Oebalus or Achelous by Poseidon she became the mother of Lecheas and Cenchrias
• Salamis	Island of Salamis	mother of Cychreus by Poseidon
• Sinope	Sinope, Anatolia	mother of Syrus by Apollo
• Tanagra	Tanagra, Boeotia	mother of Leucippus and Ephippus by Poemander
• Thebe	Thebes, Boeotia	wife of Zethus and also said to have consorted with Zeus
• Thespeia	Thespia, Boeotia	abducted by Apollo
Astacides	Lake Astacus, Bithynia	appeared in the myth of Nicaea
• Nicaea	Nicaea, Bithynia	
Asterionides	Asterion River, Argos	daughters of the river god Asterion; nurses of the infant goddess Hera
• Acraea	Asterion River, Argos	
• Euboea	Asterion River, Argos	
• Prosymna	Asterion River, Argos	
Carian Naiades (Caria)	Caria	
• Salmacis	Halicarnassus, Caria	
Nymphs of Ceos	Island of Ceos	
Corycian Nymphs (Corycian Cave)	Corycian cave, Delphi, Phocis	daughters of the river god Pleistos
• Kleodora (or Cleodora)	Mt. Parnassus, Phocis	mother of Parnassus by Poseidon
• Corycia	Corycian cave, Delphi, Phocis	mother of Lycoreus by Apollo
• Daphnis	Mt. Parnassus, Phocis	
• Melaina	Dephi, Phocis	mother of Delphos by Apollo
Cydnides	River Cydnus in Cilicia	
Cyrenaean Nymphs	City of Cyrene, Libya	
Cyprian Nymphs	Island of Cyprus	
Cyrtonian Nymphs	Town of Cyrtone, Boeotia	Κυρτωνιαι
Deliades	Island of Delos	daughters of Inopus, god of the river Inopus
Dodonides	Oracle at Dodona	
Erasinides	Erasinos River, Argos	daughters of the river god Erasinos; attendants of the goddess Britomartis.
• Anchiroe	Erasinos River, Argos	
• Byze	Erasinos River, Argos	
• Maera	Erasinos River, Argos	
• Melite	Erasinos River, Argos	
Nymphs of the river Granicus	River Granicus	daughters of the river-god Granicus
• Alexirhoe	River Granicus	mother of Aesacus by Priam
• Pegasis	River Granicus	mother of Atymnios by Emathion
Heliades	River Eridanos	daughters of Helios who were changed into trees
Himeriai Naiades	Local springs at the town of Himera, Sicily	
Hydaspides	Hydaspes River, India	nurses of infant Zagreus
Idaean Nymphs	Mount Ida, Crete	nurses of infant Zeus
• Ida	Mount Ida, Crete	
• Adrasteia	Mount Ida, Crete	
Inachides	Inachos River, Argos	daughters of the river god Inachus
• Io	Inachos River, Argos	mother of Epaphus by Zeus
• Amymone	Inachos River, Argos	
• Philodice	Inachos River, Argos	wife of Leucippus of Messenia by whom she became the mother of Hilaeira, Phoebe and possibly Arsinoe
• Messeis	Inachos River, Argos	
• Hyperia	Inachos River, Argos	
• Mycene	Inachos River, Argos	wife of Arestor and by him probably the mother of Argus Panoptes; eponym of Mycenae
Ionides	Kytheros River in Elis	daughters of the river god Cytherus
• Calliphaea	Kytheros River in Elis	
• Iasis	Kytheros River in Elis	
• Pegaea	Kytheros River in Elis	
• Synallaxis	Kytheros River in Elis	
Ithacian Nymphs	Local springs and caves on the island of Ithaca	
Ladonides	Ladon River	
Lamides or Lamusides	Lamos River in Cilicia	possible nurses of infant Dionysus
Leibethrides	Mounts Helicon and Leibethrios in Boeotia; or Mount Leibethros in Thrace)	
• Libethrias		
• Petra		
Lelegeides	Lycia, Anatolia	
Lycaean Nymphs	Mount Lycaeus	nurses of infant Zeus, perhaps a subgroup of the Oceanides
Melian Nymphs	Island of Melos	transformed into frogs by Zeus; not to be confused with the Meliae (ash tree nymphs)
Mycalessides	Mount Mycale in Caria, Anatolia	
Mysian Nymphs	Spring of Pegai near Lake Askanios in Bithynia	who abducted Hylas
• Euneica	Spring of Pegai near Lake Askanios in Bithynia	
• Malis	Spring of Pegai near Lake Askanios in Bithynia	
• Nycheia	Spring of Pegai near Lake Askanios in Bithynia	
Naxian Nymphs	Mount Drios on the island of Naxos	nurses of infant Dionysus; were syncretized with the Hyades
• Cleide	Mount Drios on the island of Naxos	
• Coronis	Mount Drios on the island of Naxos	
• Philia	Mount Drios on the island of Naxos	
Neaerides	Thrinacia Island	daughters of Helios and Neaera, watched over Helios' cattle
Nymphaeides	Nymphaeus River in Paphlagonia	
Nysiads	Mount Nysa	nurses of infant Dionysos, identified with Hyades
Ogygian Nymphs	Island of Ogygia	four handmaidens of Calypso
Ortygian Nymphs	Local springs of Syracuse, Sicily	named for the island of Ortygia
Othreides	Mount Othrys	a local group of Hamadryads
Pactolides	Pactolus River	
• Euryanassa	Pactolus River	wife of Tantalus
Pelionides	Mount Pelion	nurses of the Centaurs
Phaethonides		a synonym for the Heliades
Phaseides	Phasis River	
Rhyndacides	Rhyndacus River in Mysia	daughters of the river god Rhyndacus
Sithnides	Fountain at the town of Megara	
Spercheides	River Spercheios	one of them, Diopatra, was loved by Poseidon and the others were changed by him into trees
Sphragitides, or Cithaeronides	Mount Cithaeron	
Tagids, Tajids, Thaejids or Thaegids	River Tagus in Portugal and Spain	
Thessalides	Peneus River in Thessaly	
Thriae	Mount Parnassos	prophets and nurses of Apollo
Trojan Nymphs	Local springs of Troy	

=== Others ===
The following is a selection of names of the nymphs whose class was not specified in the source texts. For lists of Naiads, Oceanids, Dryades etc., see respective articles.

Individual names of some of the nymphs
Names	Location	Relations and Notes
Alphesiboea	India	loved by Dionysus
Aora	Crete	eponym of the town Aoros in Crete
Areia	Crete	daughter of Cleochus and mother of Miletus by Apollo
Axioche or Danais	Elis	mother of Chrysippus by Pelops
Brettia	Mysia	eponym of Abrettene, Mysia
Brisa		brought up the god Dionysus
Calybe	Troy	mother of Bucolion, Laomedon
Carmentis or Carmenta	Arcadia	She had a son with Hermes, called Evander. Her son was the founder of Pallantium, one of the cities that was merged later into ancient Rome.
Chalcea		mother of Olympus by Zeus
Chania		a lover of Heracles
Chariclo	Thebes	mother of Tiresias by Everes
Charidia		mother of Alchanus by Zeus
Chryse	Lemnos	fell in love with Philoctetes
Cirrha	Phocis	eponym of Cirrha in Phocis
Clymene		mother of Tlesimenes by Parthenopaeus
Cretheis		briefly mentioned in Suda
Crimisa	Italy	eponym of a city in Italy
Deiopea		one of Hera's nymphs who was promised to Aeolus
Dodone	Dodona	eponym of Dodona
Echemeia	Cos	spelled "Ethemea" by Hyginus, consort of Merops
Eidothea	Mt. Othrys	mother by Eusiros of Cerambus
Eunoë	Phrygia	possible mother of Hecuba by Dymas
Eunoste	Boeotia (possibly)	nurse of Eunostus
Euryte	Athens	mother of Halirrhothius by Poseidon
Harmonia	Akmonian Wood, near Themiscyra	mother of the Amazons by Ares
Hegetoria	Rhodes	consort of Ochimus
Hemera		mother of Iasion by Zeus
Himalia	Rhodes	mother of Cronius, Spartaios, and Cytos by Zeus
Hyale		belongs to the train of Artemis
Hyllis	Argos	possible eponym of the tribe Hylleis and the city Hylle
Idaea	Crete	mother of Cres and Asterion by Zeus
Idaea	Mt. Ida, Troad	mother of Teucer by Scamander
Ithome	Messenia	one of the nurses of Zeus
Laodice	Argolis (possibly)	mother of Apis by Phoroneus
Leucophryne	Magnesia (possibly)	priestess of Artemis Leucophryne
Lotis		pursued by Priapus and was changed into a tree that bears her name
Ma		nymph in the suite of Rhea who nursed Zeus
Melanippe	Attica (possibly)	married Itonus, son of Amphictyon
Melissa	Crete	nurse of Zeus
Mendeis	Thrace	consort of Sithon
Menodice		daughter of Orion and mother of Hylas by Theiodamas
Methone	Pieria	mother of Oeagrus by King Pierus of Emathia
Myrmex	Attica	beloved companion of Athena whom she turned into an ant
Nacole	Phrygia	eponym of Nacoleia in Phrygia
Neaera	Thrinacia	mother of Lampetia and Phaethusa by Helios
Neaera		mother of Aegle by Zeus
Neaera	Lydia	mother of Dresaeus by Theiodamas
Nymphe	Samothrace	mother of Saon by Zeus
Oeneis		mother of Pan by Hermes
Oenoe	Sicinus	mother of Sicinus by Thoas
Olbia	Bithynia	mother of Astacus by Poseidon
Paphia		possibly the mother of Cinyras by Eurymedon
Pareia	Paros	mother of four sons by Minos
Polydora		one of the Danaïdes
Pyronia		mother of Iasion by Minos
Psalacantha	Icaria	changed into a plant by Dionysus
Rhene	Mt. Cyllene, Arcadia	consorted with Oileus
Semestra	Thrace	nurse of Keroessa
Teledice	Argolis (possibly)	a consort of Phoroneus
Thalia	Sicily	mother of the Palici by Zeus
Thisbe	Boeotia	eponym of the town of Thisbe
Tithorea	Mt. Parnassus, Phocis	eponym of the town of Tithorea (previously called Neon)

=== In non-Greek tales influenced by Greek mythology ===
- Sabrina (the river Severn)
- Tágides (Tagus River)

== Gallery ==
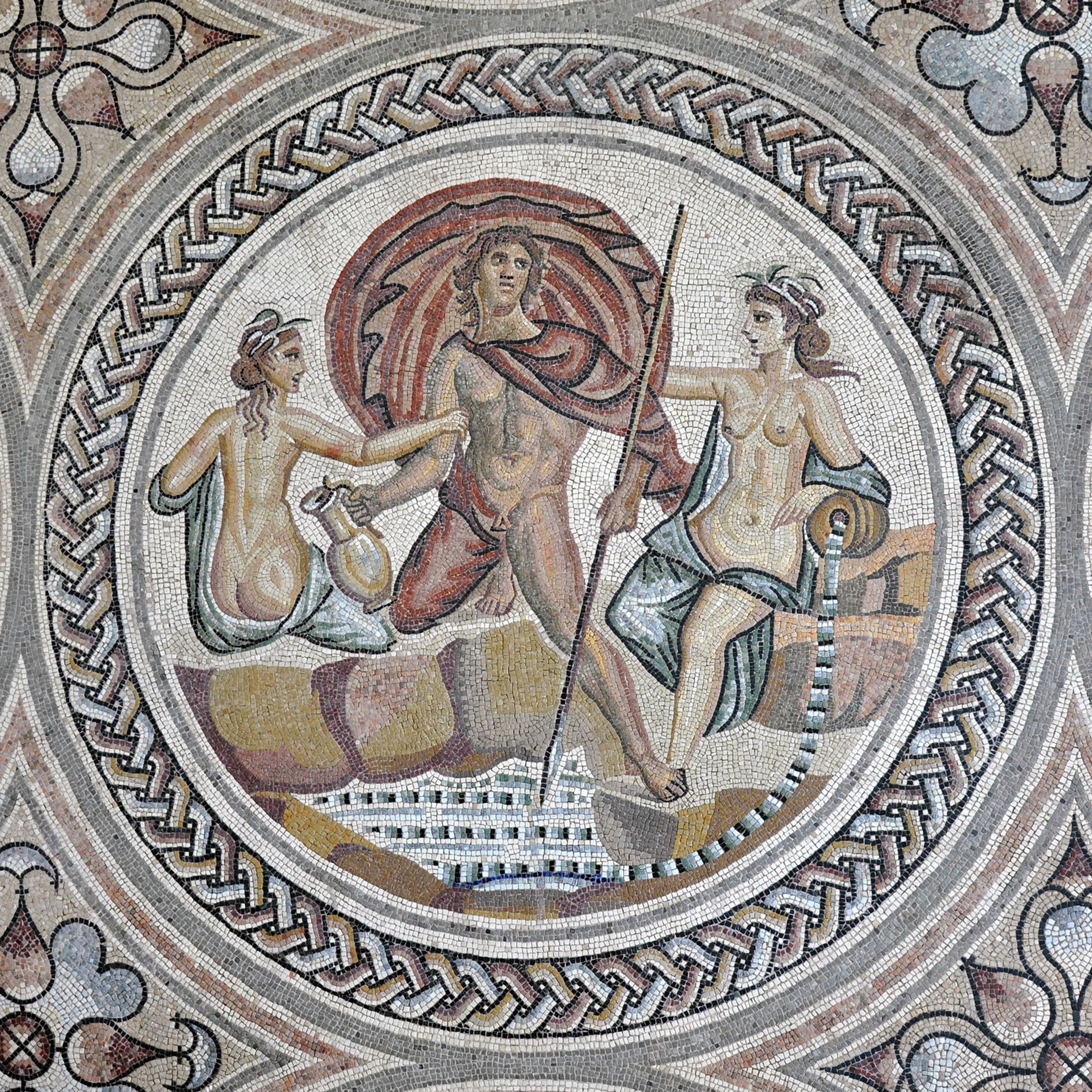
Hylas and nymphs from a mosaic in Roman Gaul (3rd century)

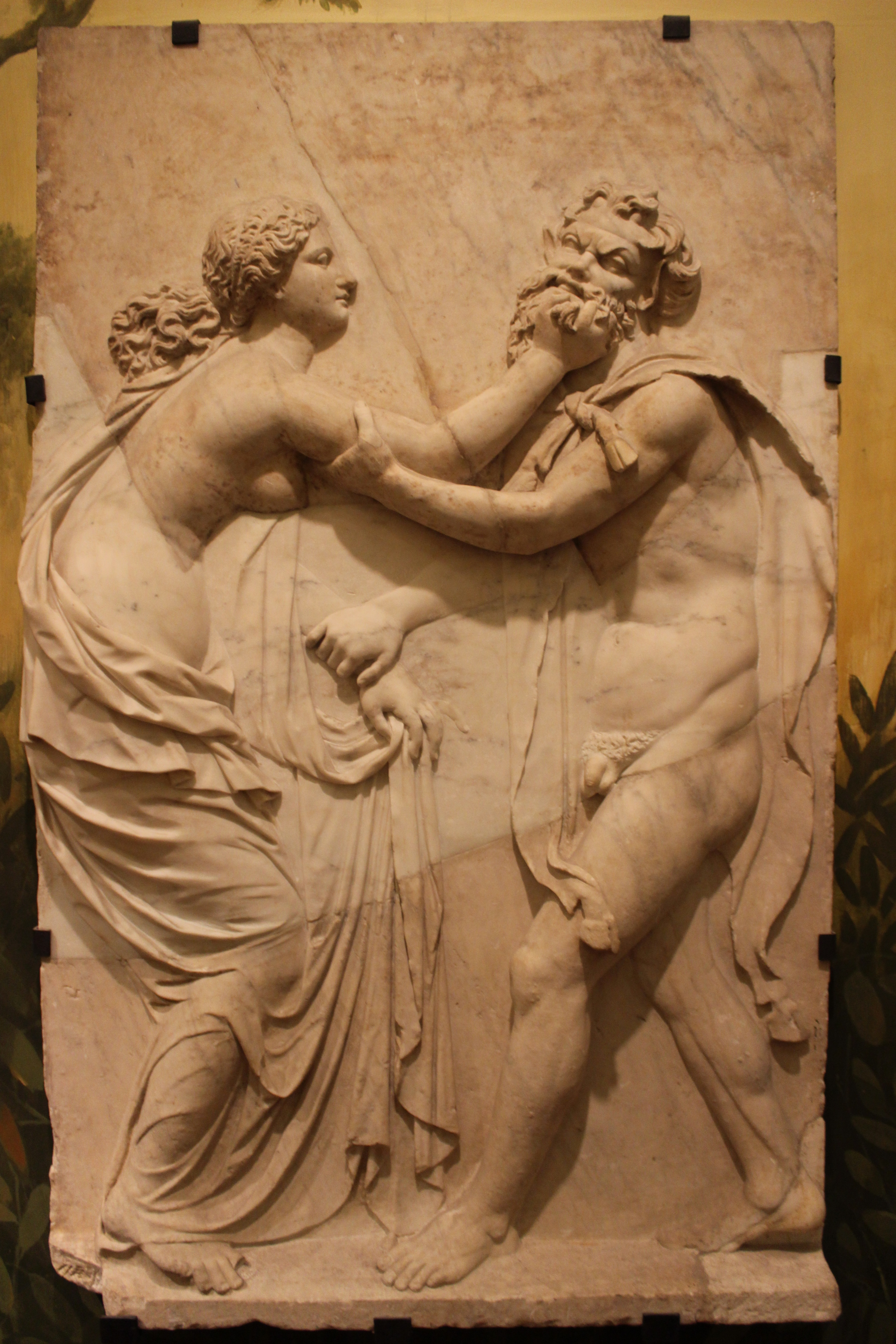
Fight between Nymph and Satyr, Naples National Archaeological Museum

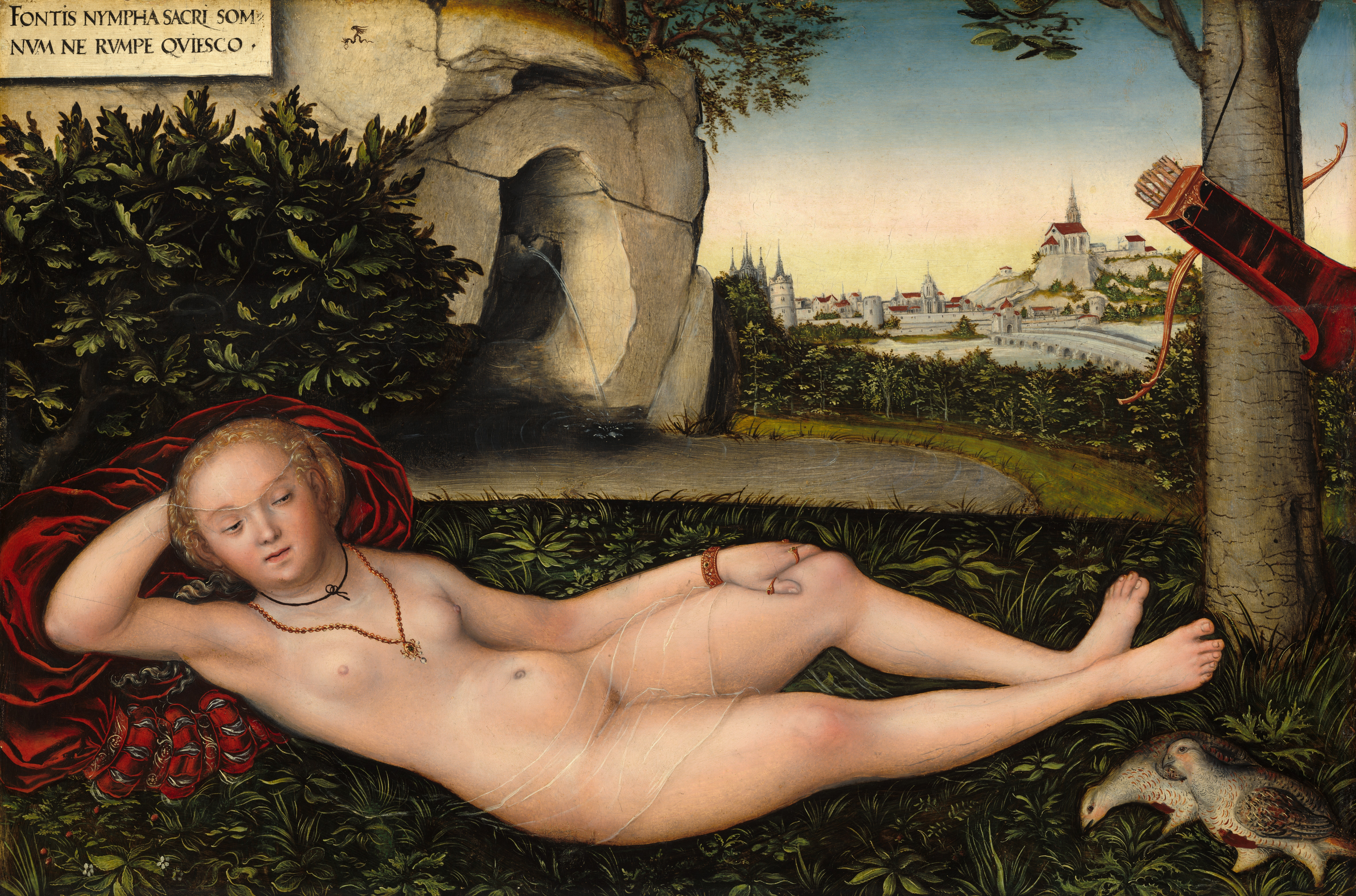
The Nymph of the Spring
by Lucas Cranach the Elder
National Gallery of Art
(c. 1537)

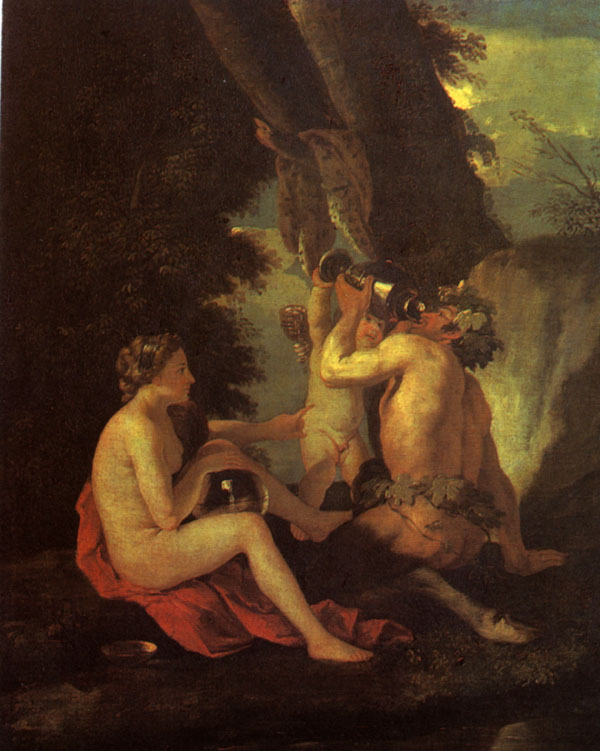
Nymphe and Satyr by Nicolas Poussin - Pushkin Museum, Moscow (between 1626 and 1628)

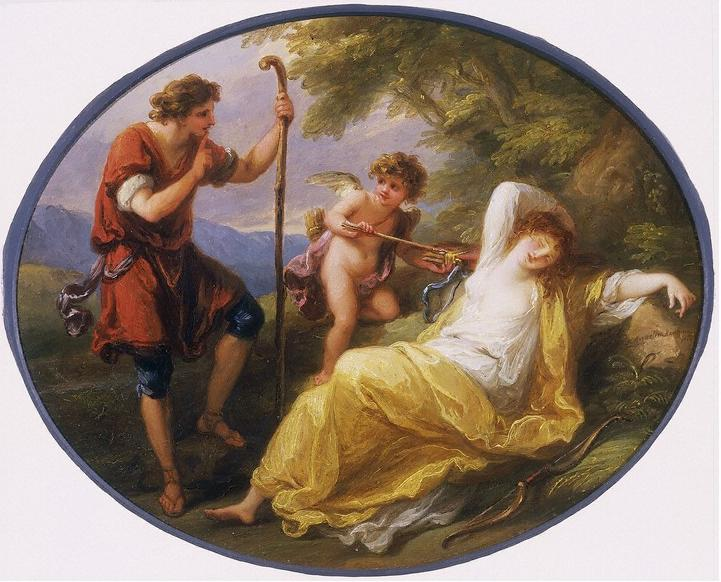
A Sleeping Nymph Watched by a Shepherd by Angelica Kauffman (about 1780, V&A Museum no. 23–1886)

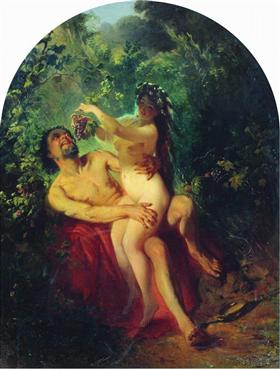
Satyr and nymph by Konstantin Makovsky (1864)

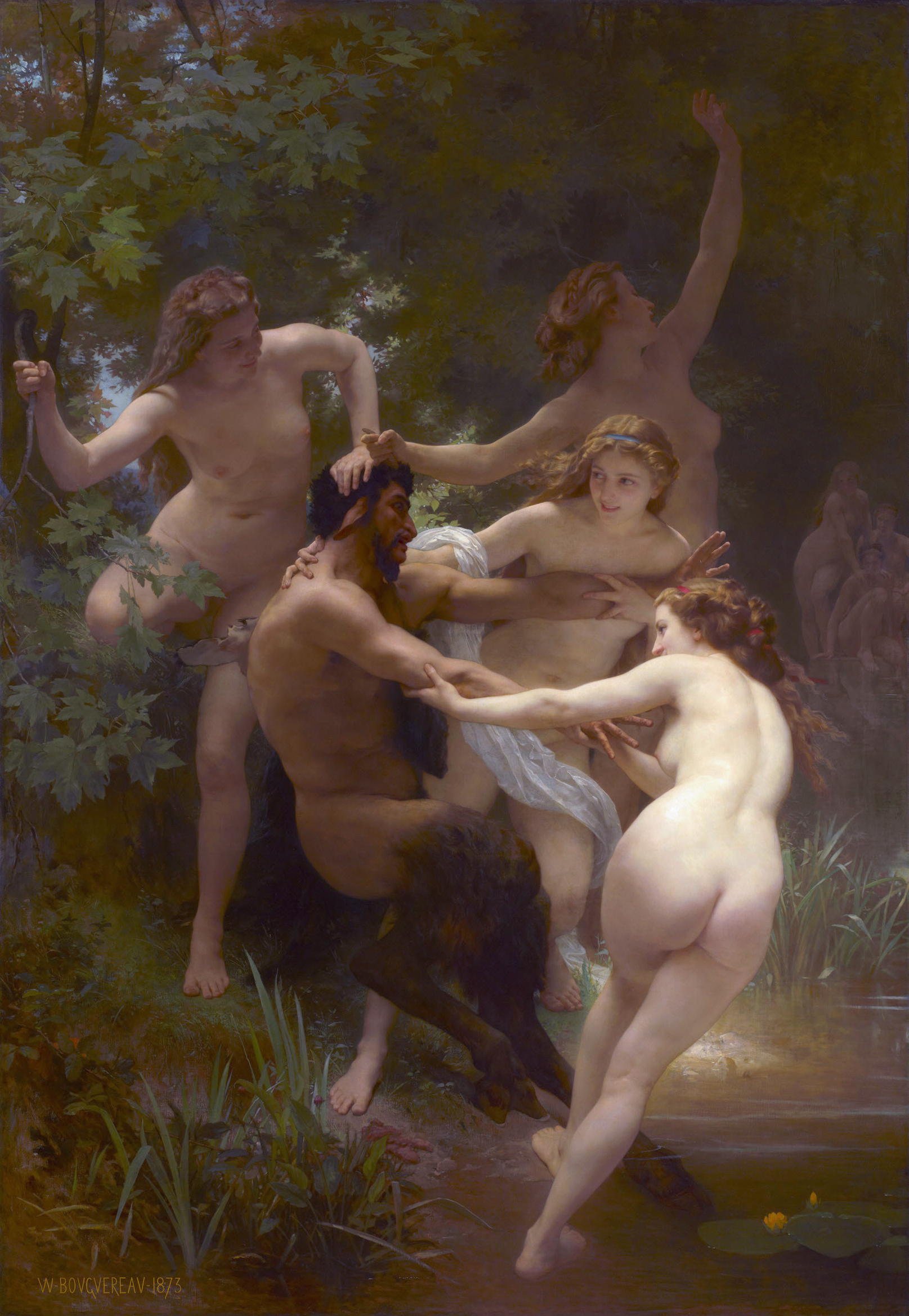
Nymphs and Satyr by William-Adolphe Bouguereau (1873)

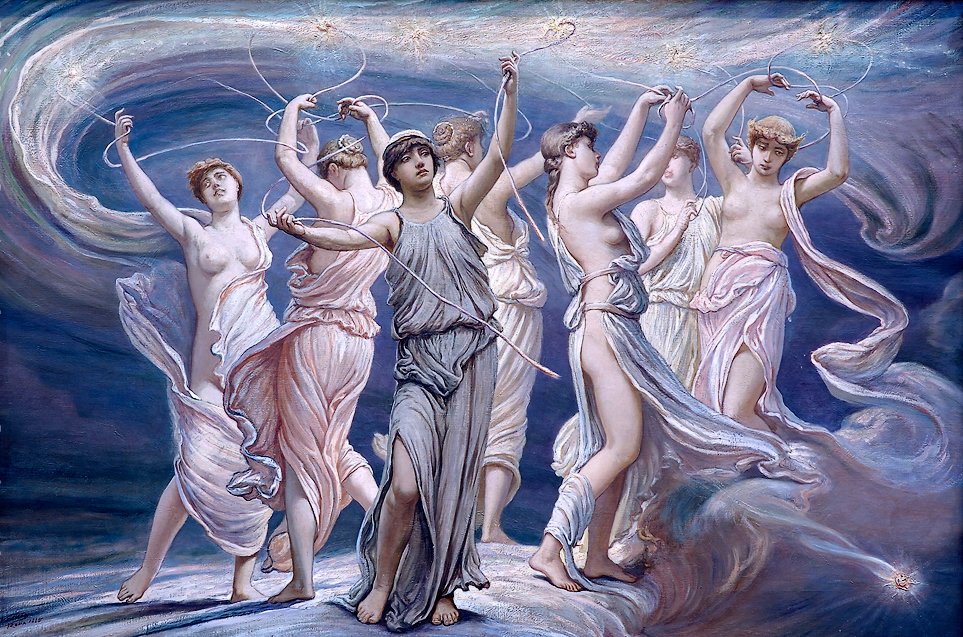
The Pleiades by Elihu Vedder (1885)

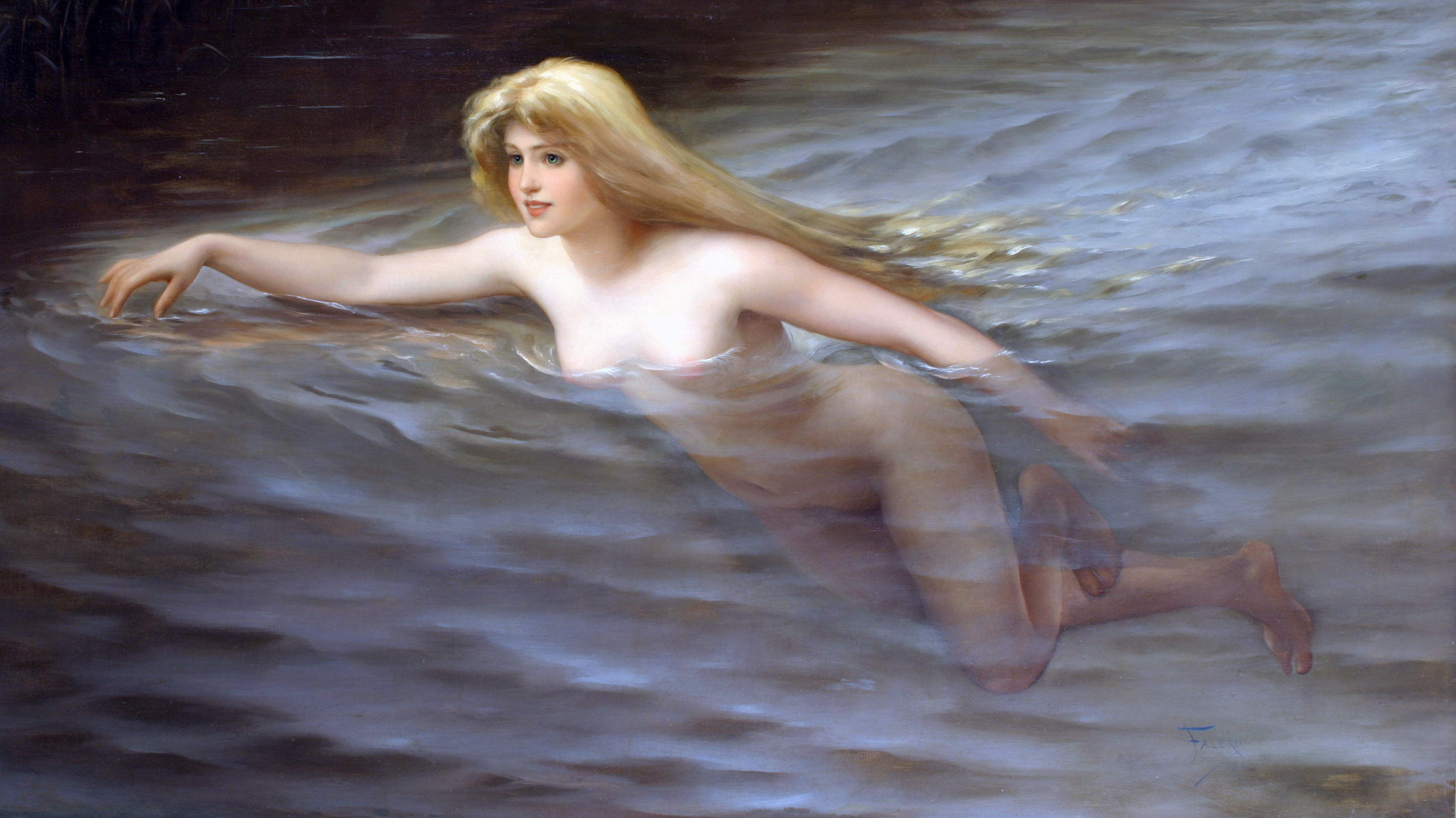
A naiad by Luis Ricardo Falero (1892)

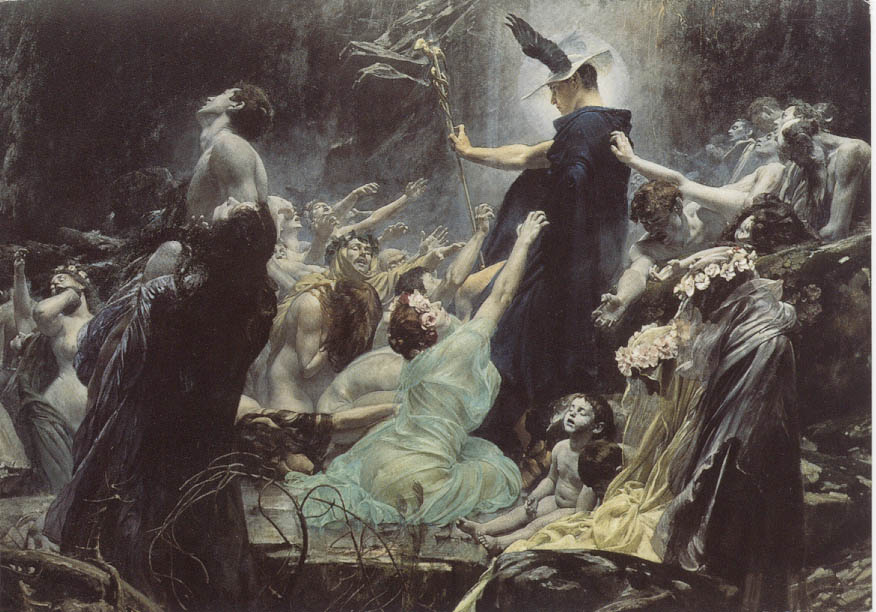
The Souls of Acheron by Adolf Hirémy-Hirschl (1898)

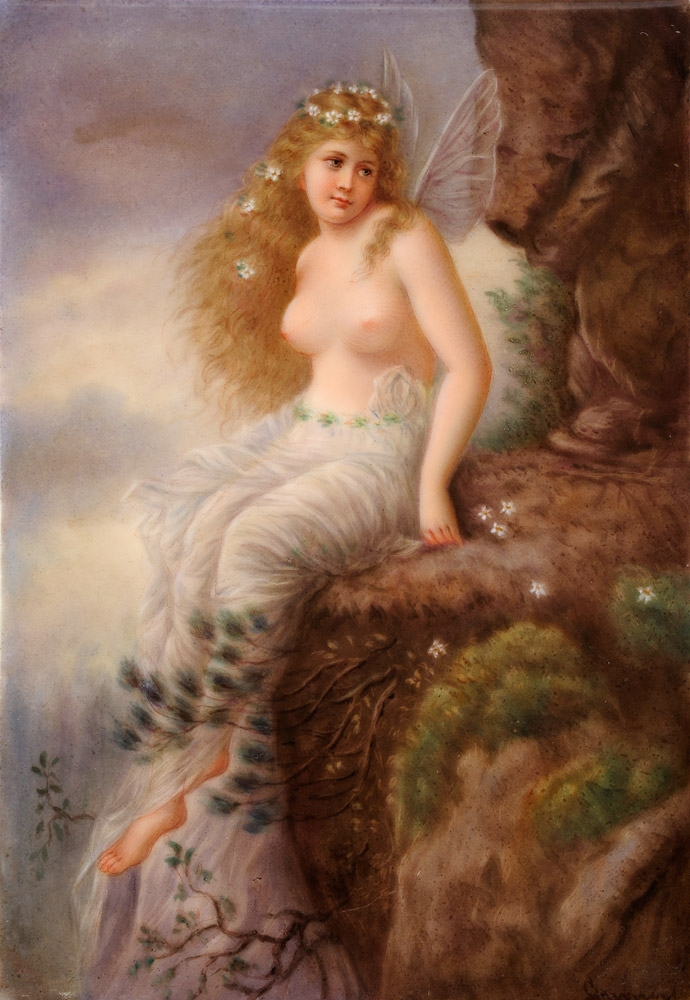
Young oread, on German porcelain plate (late 19th century)

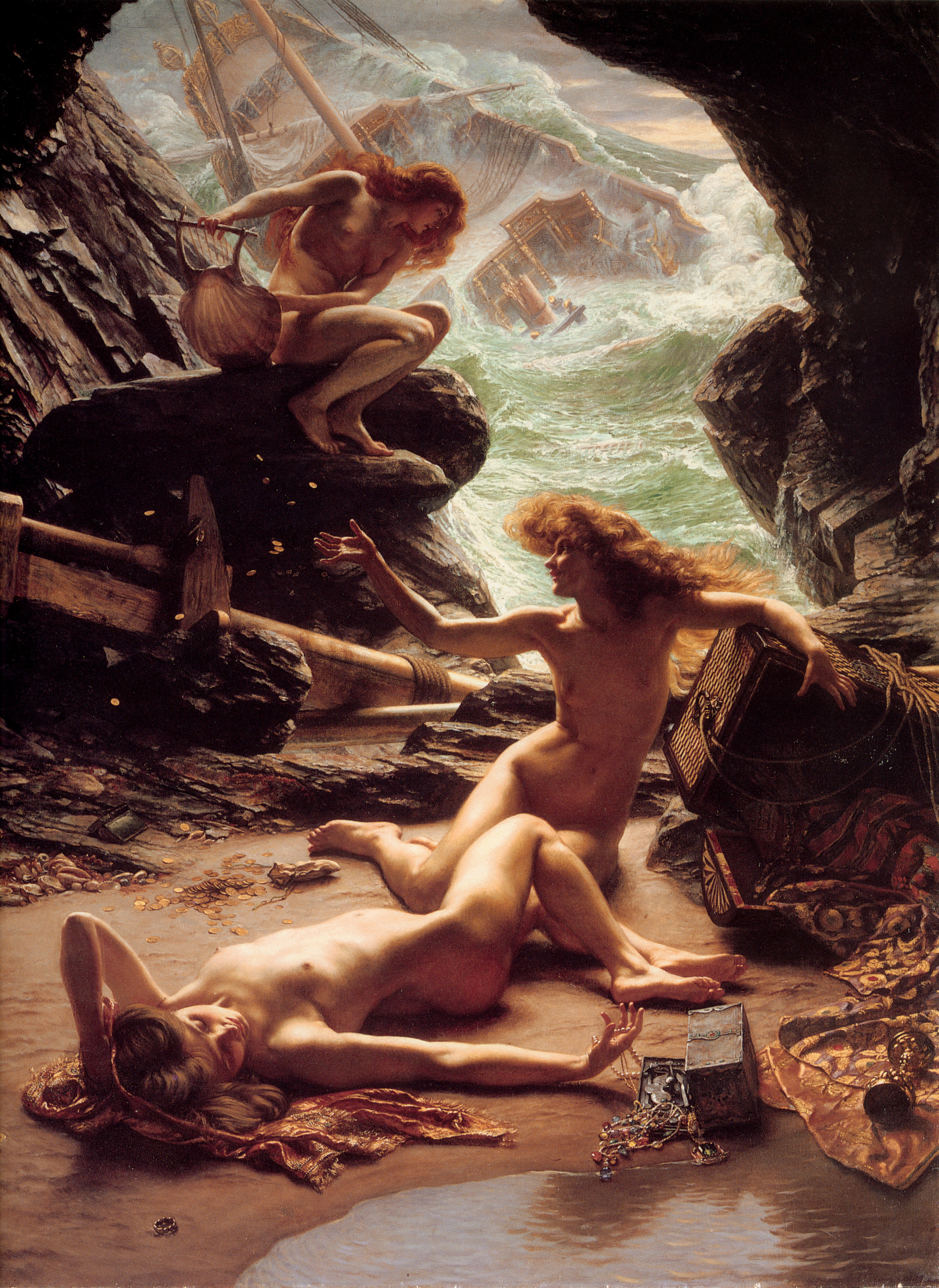
The Cave of the Storm Nymphs by Sir Edward John Poynter (1903)

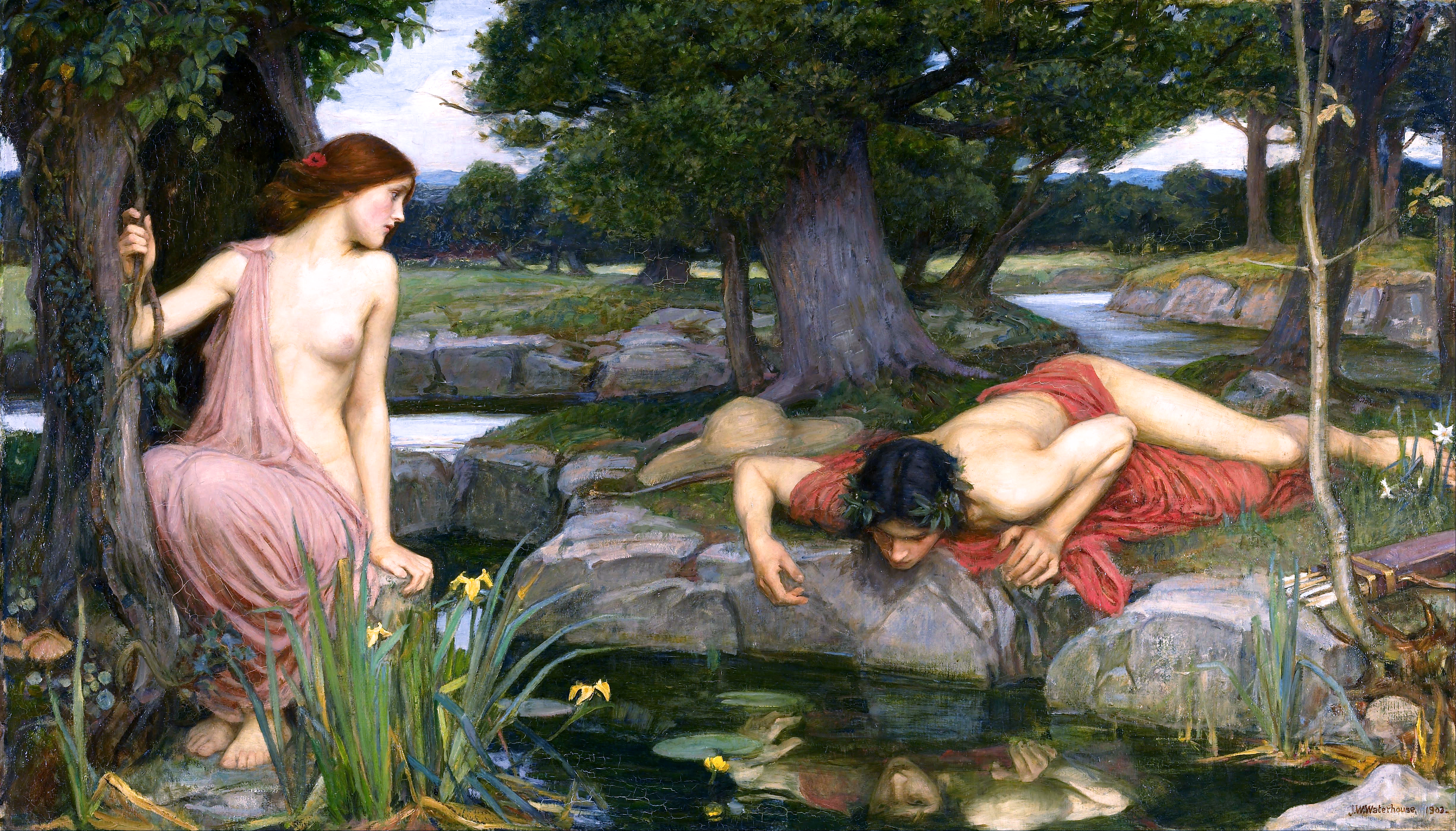
Echo, an Oread (mountain nymph) watches Narcissus in this 1903 painting of Echo and Narcissus by John William Waterhouse

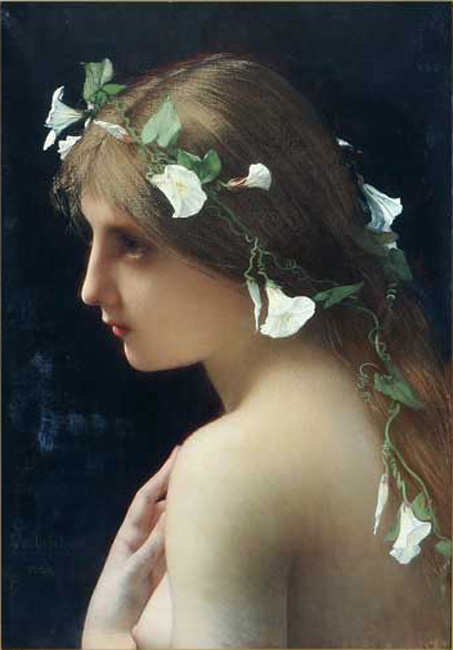
Nymph with morning glory flowers by Jules Joseph Lefebvre

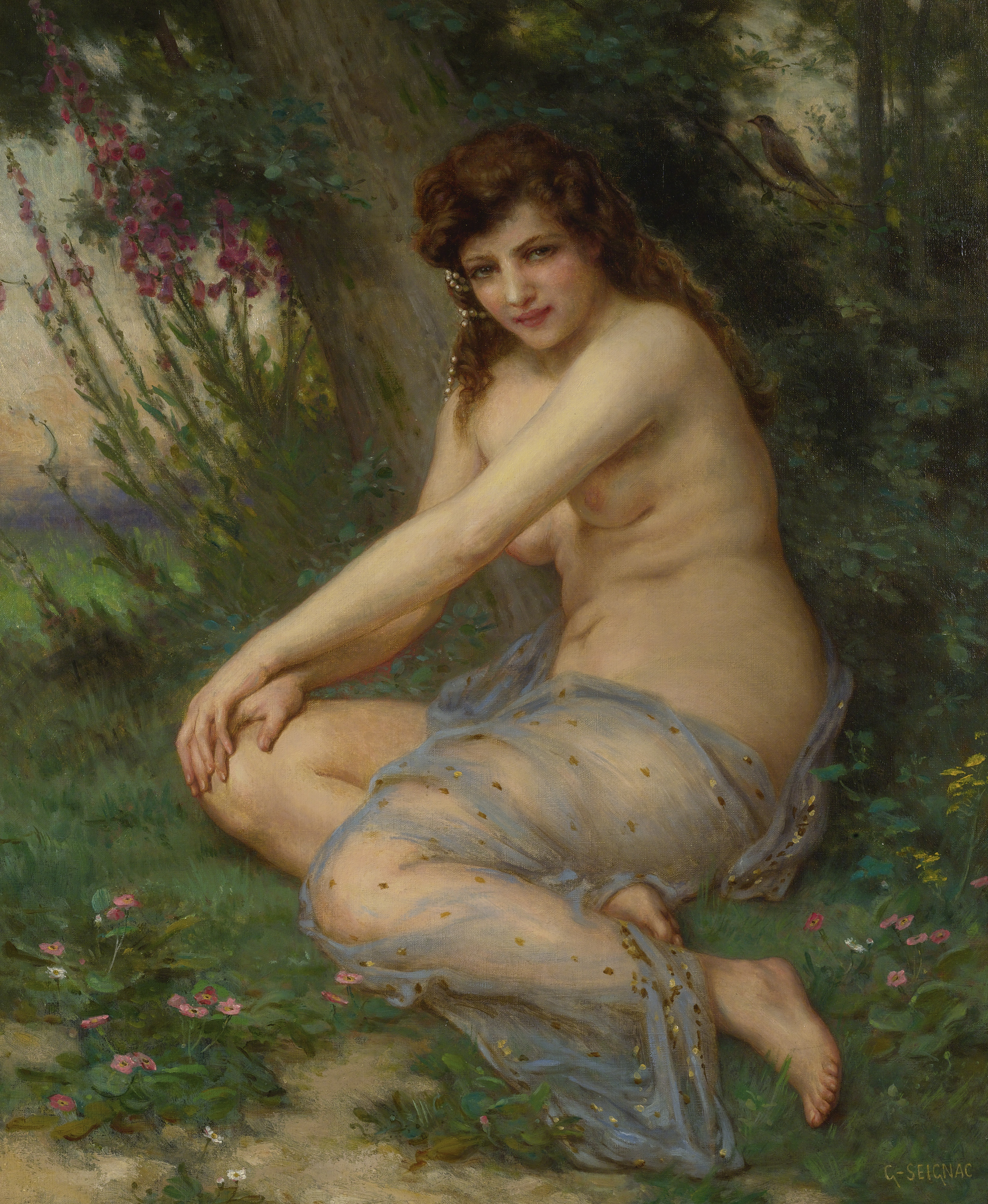
La Nymphe de la Foret by Guillaume Seignac

== See also ==
- Animism
- Apsaras
- Fairy
- Houri
- Kami
- Mimi
- Nunnehi
- Nymphaeum
- Pitsa panels
- Plant soul
- Rå
- Xian
- Vila
- Yakshini
- Zana
- List of Greek deities
