= Naiad =

Female spirit or nymph in Greek mythology

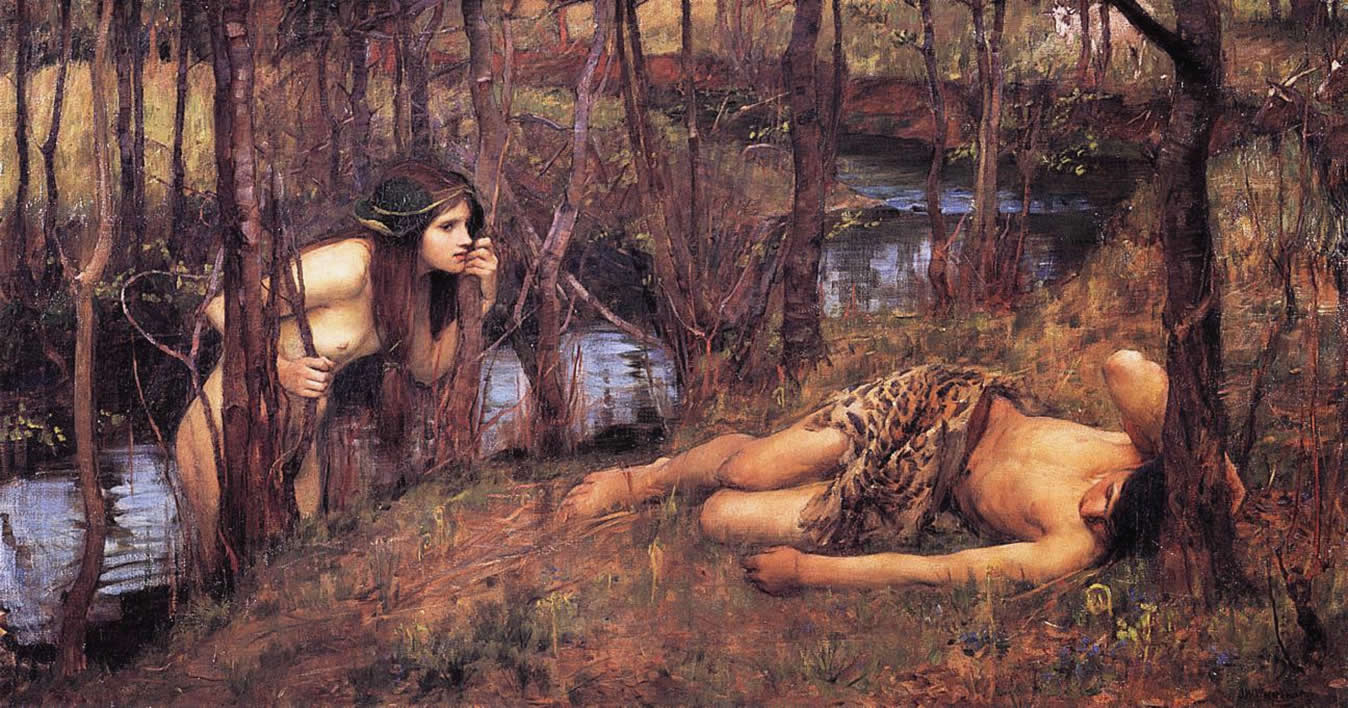
- A Naiad by John William Waterhouse, 1893; a water nymph approaches the sleeping Hylas.

Creature information
- Grouping: Nymphs

Origin
- Habitat: Any body of fresh water

In Greek mythology, the naiads (/ˈnaɪædz, ˈneɪædz, -ədz/; Ancient Greek: ναϊάδες, romanized: naïádes), sometimes also hydriads, are a type of female spirit, or nymph, presiding over fountains, wells, springs, streams, brooks and other bodies of fresh water. They are distinct from river gods, who embodied rivers.

== Etymology ==
The Greek word is ναϊάς (naïás [naːiás]), plural ναϊάδες (naïádes [naːiádes]). It derives from νάειν (náein), "to flow", or νᾶμα (nâma), "body of flowing water".

== Mythology ==
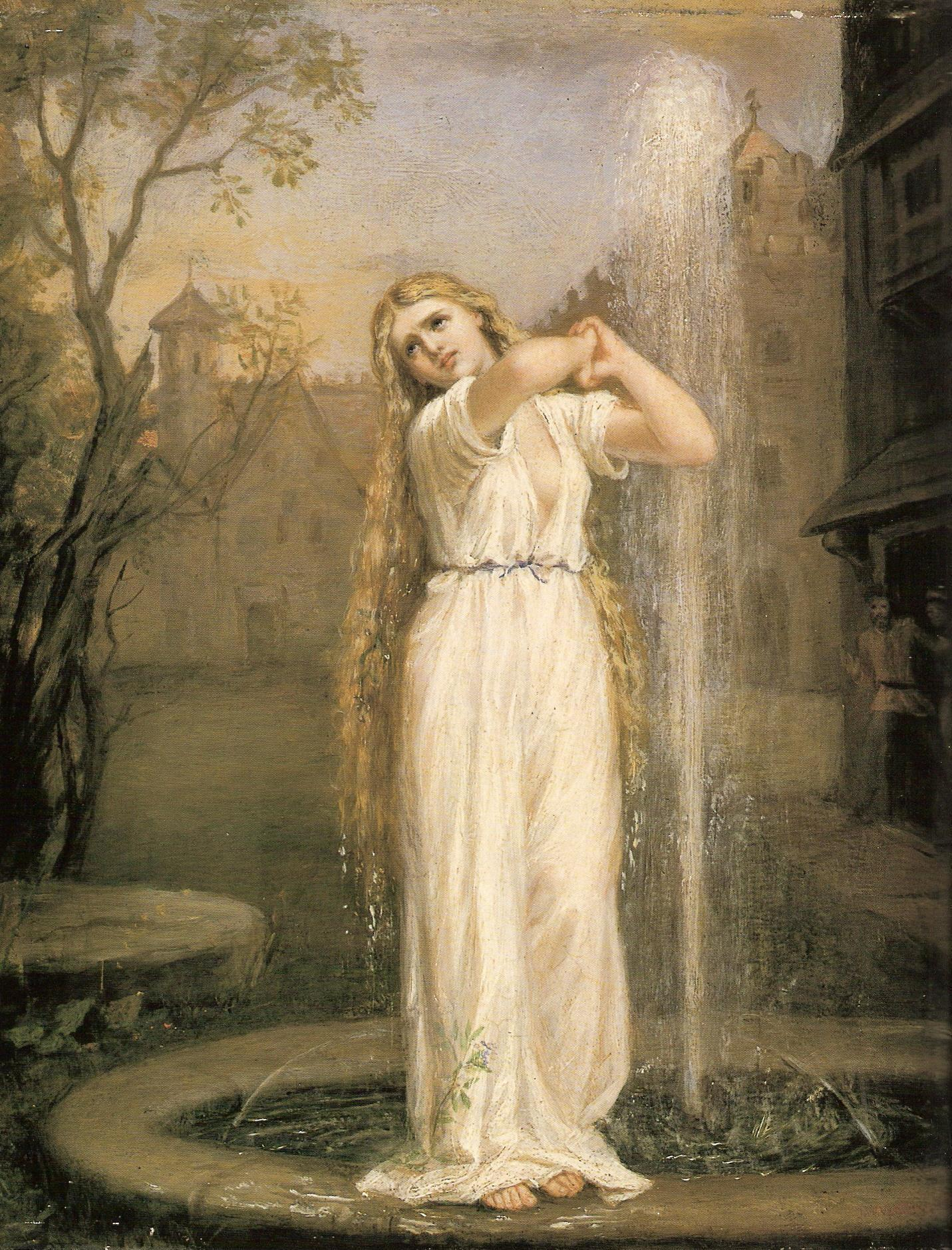
Undine, by John William Waterhouse

Naiads were often the object of archaic local cults, worshipped as essential to humans. Boys and girls at coming-of-age ceremonies dedicated their childish locks to the local naiad of the spring. In places like Lerna their waters' ritual cleansings were credited with magical medical properties. Animals were ritually drowned there. Oracles might be situated by ancient springs.

Naiads could be dangerous: Hylas of the Argo's crew was lost when he was taken by naiads fascinated by his beauty. The naiads were also believed to exhibit jealous tendencies. Theocritus's story of naiad jealousy was that of a shepherd, Daphnis, who was the lover of Nomia or Echenais; Daphnis had on several occasions been unfaithful to Nomia and as revenge she permanently blinded him. The nymph Salmacis raped Hermaphroditus and fused with him when he tried to escape.

The water nymph associated with particular springs was known all through Europe in places with no direct connection with Greece, surviving in the Celtic wells of northwest Europe that have been rededicated to Saints, and in the medieval Melusine.

Walter Burkert points out, "When in the Iliad [xx.4–9] Zeus calls the gods into assembly on Mount Olympus, it is not only the well-known Olympians who come along, but also all the nymphs and all the rivers; Okeanos alone remains at his station". Greek hearers recognized this impossibility as the poet's hyperbole, which proclaimed the universal power of Zeus over the ancient natural world: "the worship of these deities," Burkert confirms, "is limited only by the fact that they are inseparably identified with a specific locality."

== Interpretation ==
In the back-story of the myth of Aristaeus, Hypseus, a king of the Lapiths, married Chlidanope, a naiad, who bore him Cyrene. Aristaeus had more than ordinary mortal experience with the naiads: when his bees died in Thessaly, he went to consult them. His aunt Arethusa invited him below the water's surface, where he was washed with water from a perpetual spring and given advice.

== List of naiads ==
Individual names of Naiads
Names	Location	Reference	Names	Location	Reference
Aba	Ciconia, Thrace		Lilaea	Lilaea, Phocis	
Abarbarea	River Aesepus, Troad		Limnaee	River Ganges, India	
Abarbarea	Tyre		Liriope	River Cephisus, Phocis	
Acraea	River Asterion, Argos		Lotis	Dryopia or Doris	
Aea	Colchis		Loxo	Thrace	
Aegina	Aegina		Maera	River Erasinus, Argolis	
Aegle			Melaena	Delphi, Phocis	
Aganippe	Mt. Helicon, Boeotia		Melia	Argolis	
Alcinoe	Mt. Lycaeus, Arcadia		Melia	Ismenian spring, Thebes	
Alexirhoe	River Granicus, Troad		Melia	Malea, Laconia	
Amalthea	Arcadia or Crete		Melia	Bebryces, Bithynia	
Anchinoe	River Nile, Egypt		Melia	Cius, Bithynia	
Anchiroe	Megalopolis, Arcadia		Melia	Ceos	
Anchiroe	River Chremetes, Libya		Melite	Corcyra	
Anchiroe	River Erasinus, Argolis		Melite	River Erasinus, Argolis	
Anippe	River Nile, Egypt		Memphis	River Nile, Egypt	
Anthedon	Anthedon, Boeotia		Menippe	River Peneus, Thessaly	
Anthracia	Mt. Lycaeus, Arcadia		Messeis	River Inachus, Argos	
Antiope	Mt. Cithaeron, Boeotia		Methone	Methone, Pieria	
Arethusa	Syracuse, Sicily		Metope	Stymphalus, Arcadia	
Argiope	River Nilus, Egypt		Mideia	Aspledon, Boeotia	
Argiope	Mt. Parnassus, Phocis		Minthe	Mt. Mintha, Elis	
Argiope	Eleusis		Moria	River Hermus, Lydia	
Argyra	Argyra, Achaea		Mycene	Mycenae, Argolis	
Ascra	Ascra, Boeotia		Myrtoessa	Mt. Lycaeus, Arcadia	
Asopis	Asopis		Nacole	Nacoleia, Phrygia	
Asterodia	Mt. Caucasus		Nais	Pyrrhichus, Laconia	
Asterope or Hesperia	River Cebren, Troad		Nana	River Sangarius, Phrygia	
Astyoche	River Simoeis, Troad		Neaera	Edonia, Thrace	
Batia	Sparta, Laconia		Neaera	Mt. Sipylus, Lydia	
Bolina	Bolina, Achaea		Neda	River Neda, Arcadia	
Byze	River Erasinus, Argolis		Nemea	Nemea, Argolis	
Caliadne	Rive Nile, Egypt		Nicaea	Nicaea, Bithynia	
Calliphaea	River Cytherus, Elis		Nonacris	Nonacris, Arcadia	
Callirrhoe	Tyre		Nychea	Taphos	
Callirrhoe	Acarnania		Nycheia	Spring Pegaea, Mysia	
Callirrhoe	River Scamander, Troad		Ocyrhoe	River Sangarius, Phrygia	
Callirrhoe	River Meander, Caria		Ocyrhoe	Samos	
Callirrhoe	River Nestus, Thrace		Ocyrhoe	River Caicus, Teuthrania	
Cassotis	Mt. Parnassus, Phocis		Ocyrhoe	Colchis	
Castalia	Mt. Parnassus, Phocis		Oenoe	Mt. Lycaeus, Arcadia	
Celusa	Sicyon		Oenoe	Oenoe (later on Sicinus)	
Ceto	India		Oenone	Mt. Ida, Troad	
Chalcis	Chalcis, Euboea		Oeroe	Plataea, Mt. Cithaeron	
Chesias	Samos		Ornea	Orneae, Sicyonia	
Chione	River Nile, Egypt		Orseis	Thessaly	
Chlidanope	Thessaly		Ortygia	Ephesus, Lycia	
Claea	Mt. Calathium, Messenia		Pareia	Paros	
Cleide	Mt. Drius, Naxos		Pegaea	River Cytherus, Elis	
Cleocharia	River Eurotas, Laconia		Pegasis	River Granicus, Troad	
Cleodora	Mt. Parnassus, Phocis		Periboea	Sparta, Laconia	
Cleomede	River Axius, Paeonia		Pero	River Asopus, Sicyonia	
Cleone	Cleonae, Argolis		Petra	Mt. Libethrius, Boeotia	
Clonia	Hyria, Boeotia		Peuce	Peuce, Scythia	
Cnossia	Cnossus, Crete		Pharmacia	River Illissos, Athens	
Corcyra	Corcyra		Philia	Mt. Drius, Naxos	
Coronis	Mt. Drius, Naxos		Philodice	Argos, Argolis	
Corycia	Mt. Parnassus, Phocis		Phrixa	Mt. Lycaeus, Arcadia	
Creusa	Thessaly		Pierides		
Cyane	Syracuse, Sicily		Pirene	Corinth	
Cyanee	Miletus, Caria		Pitane	Pitane, Laconia	
Cyllene	Mt. Cyllene, Arcadia		Plataea	Plataea, Mt. Cithaeron	
Cyrene	Thessaly		Polyxo	River Nile, Egypt	
Danais	Pisa, Elis		Praxithea	Athens, Attica	
Daphne	River Ladon, Arcadia		Pronoe	Lycia	
Daulis	Daulis, Phocis		Prosymna	River Asterion, Argos	
Deino	River Spercheios, Mt. Othrys		Psanis	Arcadia	
Dercetis	Mt. Cithaeron, Boeotia		Rhodope	Thrace	
Diogeneia	Athens, Attica		Rhoeo	River Scamander, Troy	
Diopatra	River Spercheios, Mt. Othrys		Sagaritis	River Sangarius, Phrygia	
Dirce	Thebes, Boeotia		Salamis	Salamis	
Drosera	Tyre		Salmacis	Halicarnassus, Caria	
Dryope	Mt. Oeta, Malis		Samia	Samos	
Eidothea	Mt. Othrys, Malis		Sinope	Sinope	
Euboea	River Asterion, Argos		Sirens	River Achelous, Acarnania	
Euboea	Euboea		Stilbe	Thessaly	
Eupheme	Mt. Helicon, Boeotia		Strophia	Thebes, Boeotia	
Europa	River Nile, Egypt		Strymo	River Scamander, Troy	
Euryrhoe	River Nile, Egypt		Syllis	Sicyon	
Evadne	Argos, Argolis		Symaethis	River Symaethus, Sicily	
Glauce	Mt. Lycaeus, Arcadia		Synallasis	River Cytherus, Elis	
Glaucia	River Scamander, Troad		Syrinx	River Ladon, Arcadia	
Hagno	Mt. Lycaeus, Arcadia		Tanagra	Tanagra, Boeotia	
Harmonia	Acmonian wood, Anatolia		Teledice	Argolis	
Harpina	Pisa, Elis		Telphusa	Telphusian spring, Mt. Tilphusius	
Hecaerge	Thrace		Tereine	River Strymon, Thrace	
Hercyna	Hercyna, Boeotia		Thebe	Thebes, Boeotia	
Hieromneme	River Simoeis, Troad		Theisoa	Mt. Lycaeus, Arcadia	
Hypereia	River Inachus, Argos		Thelpusa	Thelpusa, Arcadia	
Iasis	River Cytherus, Elis		Themis	River Ladon, Arcadia	
Ida	Mt. Lycaeus, Arcadia		Thero	Therapne, Laconia	
Idaea	Mt. Ida, Troad		Thespia	Thespiae, Boeotia	
Ismene	Ismenian spring, Thebes		Thisbe	Thisbe, Boeotia	
Ismenis	River Ismenus, Thebes		Thronia	Abdera, Bistonia	
Langia	Nemea, Argolis		Thyia	Mt. Parnassus, Phocis	
Lara	Latium		Tiasa	Tiasa, Laconia	
Libethrias	Mt. Libethrius, Boeotia		Zeuxippe	Athens, Attica	

== Place names ==
- St. Charles Avenue in New Orleans was formerly known as Nyades Street, and is parallel to Dryades Street.
- Naiad Lake in Antarctica is named after the nymphs.
- Naiad, the innermost moon of Neptune, is named after the nymphs.

== Gallery ==
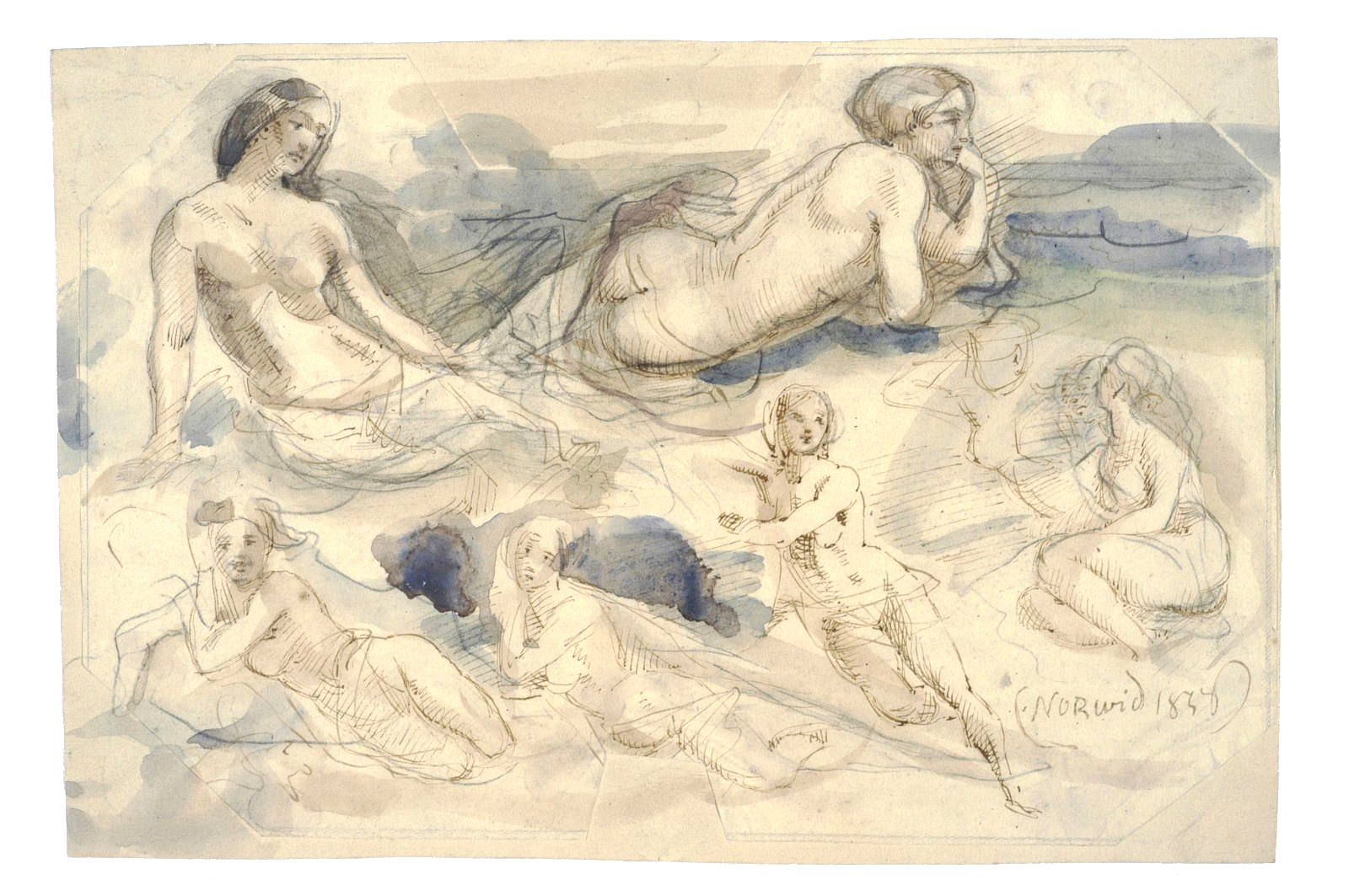
Cyprian Kamil Norwid, Naiads, 1846

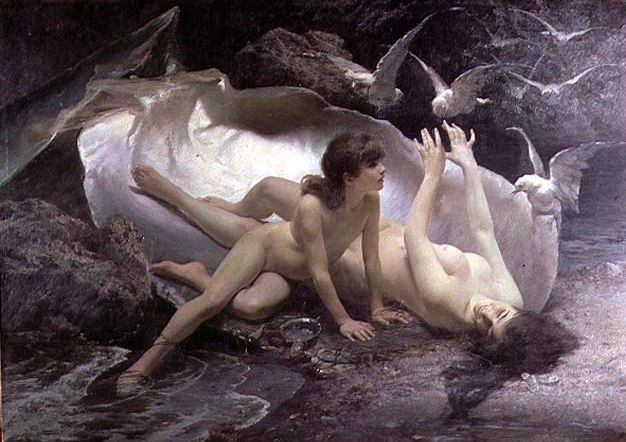
Gioacchino Pagliei, The Naiads, 1881

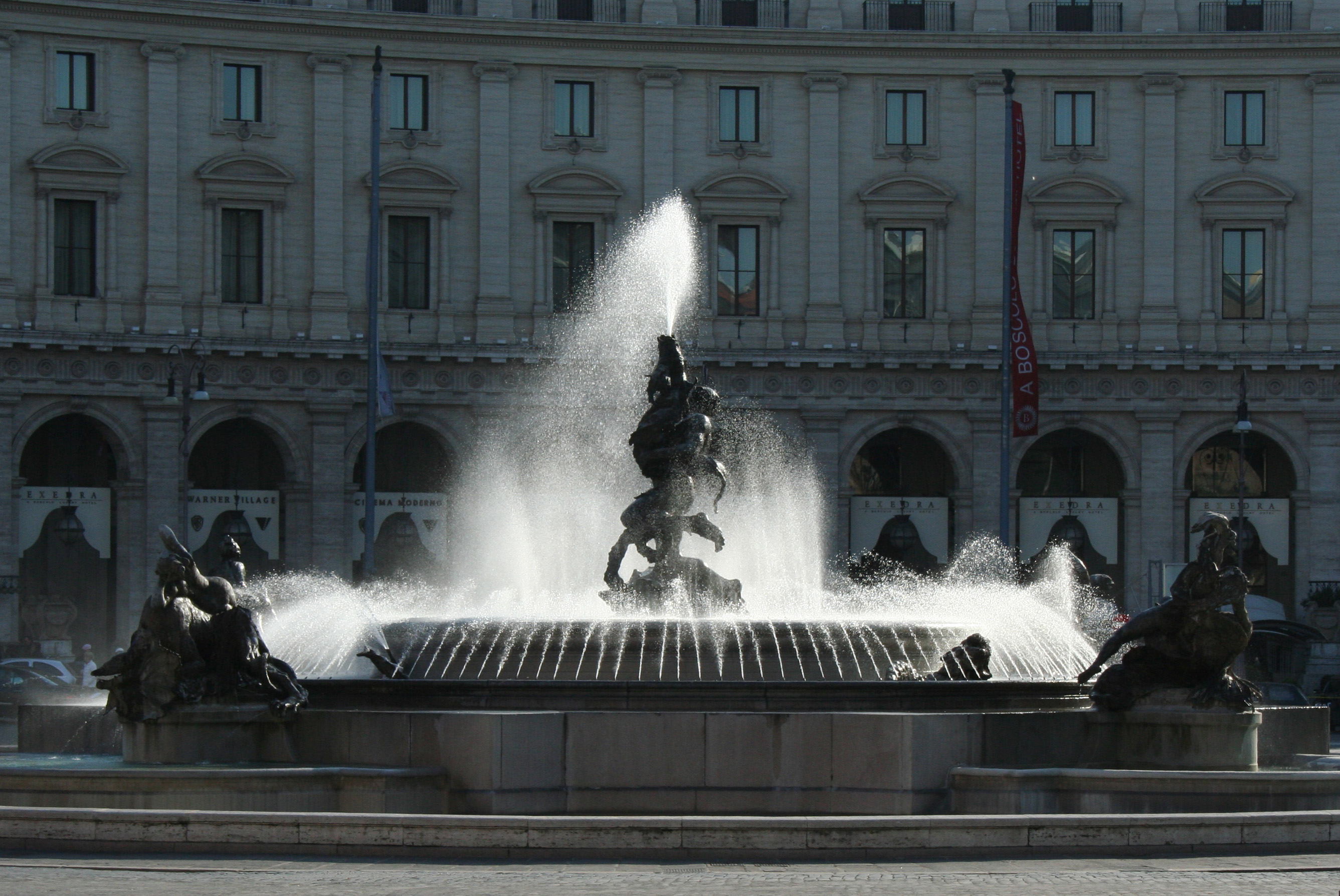
Fountain of the Naiads, 1888, Piazza della Repubblica, Rome

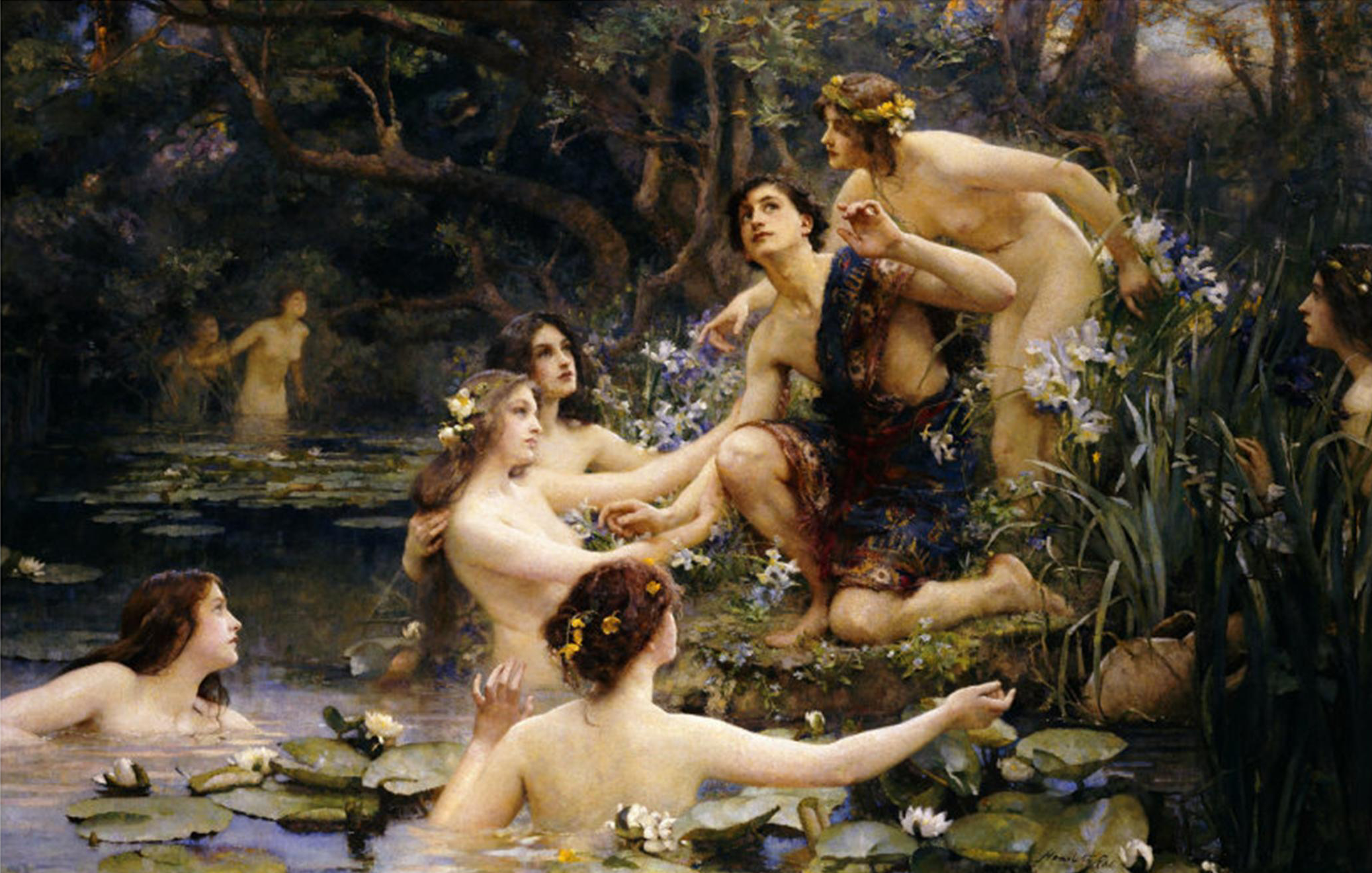
Hylas and the Water Nymphs by Henrietta Rae, 1909

== See also ==
- Camenae
- Lady of the Lake
- Mermaid
- Naia
- Nix
- Ondine
- Rusalka
- Siren
- Water spirit
