= Pirene (mythology) =

In Greek mythology, Pirene or Peirene (Ancient Greek: Πειρήνη, romanized: Peirēnē, lit. 'of the osiers' or 'made of wicker/ willow-twigs') may refer to the following women:

- Pirene, one of the Asopides, nymph–daughters of the river god Asopus and the naiad Metope, daughter of another river-deity Ladon. She was the sister of Aegina, Salamis, Thebe, Corcyra, Tanagra, Thespia, Cleone, Sinope, Asopis, Ornea and Chalcis, and her two brothers were Pelasgos and Ismenos. She was possibly the same with the below Pirene.
- Pirene, daughter of King Oebalus of Laconia, or of the river god Achelous. Probably the same as above Pirene.
- Pirene, one of the 50 Danaïdes, daughters of Danaus, king of Libya (and later of Argos) by an Ethiopian woman. On the orders of her father, she married and eventually murdered her cousin–husband Agaptolemus, son of King Aegyptus of Egypt by a Phoenician woman.
