= Pelagon =

Characters of the Greek mythology

There are several figures named Pelagon (Ancient Greek: Πελάγων, gen.: Πελάγονος, lit. 'of the deep sea' or 'man of the open sea') in Greek mythology.

- Pelagon, king of Phocis and son of Amphidamas. He gave Cadmus the cow that was to guide him to Boeotia.
- Pelagon, also called Pelasgus, son of the river-god Asopus by the naiad Metope, daughter of the river Ladon. He was brother to Ismenus, Corcyra, Salamis, Aegina, Peirene, Cleone, Thebe, Tanagra, Thespia, Asopis, Sinope, Ornea, Chalcis, Harpina and Ismene. His sisters were abducted by various gods as punishment for their father's deed.
- Pelagon, one of the suitors of Hippodamia before Pelops.
- Pelagon, one of the Calydonian hunters.
- Pelagon or Pelegon, who is given in the Iliad as the father of the Paeonian warrior Asteropaeus, son of the river-god Axius and Periboea, the daughter of Acessamenus. Presumably this Pelagon was the eponymous founder of Pelagonia.
- Pelagon, a native of Pylos who fought under Nestor in the Trojan War.
- Pelagon, an "illustrious" companion of the hero Sarpedon during the Trojan War, who removes Tlepolemus's spear from Sarpedon's thigh.
