= Euboea (mythology) =

Name of several women in Greek mythology

Euboea (/juːˈbiːə/; Ancient Greek: Εὔβοια means 'well-cattle') was the name of several women in Greek mythology.

- Euboea, one of the Argive naiad daughters of the river-god Asterion. She and her sisters, Acraea and Prosymna, were the nurses of Hera.
- Euboea, mother of Triopas and possibly Arestor by Phorbas.
- Euboea, one of the naiad daughters of the river-god Asopus and possibly Metope, the river-nymph daughter of the river Ladon. She was the sister of Aegina, Thebe, Plataea, Sinope, Thespia, Tanagra, Corcyra and Salamis. The last two and 'lovely' Euboea were all abducted by Poseidon from their father. The god brought her to Euboea where she became the eponymous heroine of the island. She may identical with Chalcis or Combe, daughters of Asopus in some myths.
- Euboea, daughter of Larymnus. She and Polybus of Sicyon were possible parents of Glaucus.
- Euboea, daughter of Macareus, king of Locris. She bore Apollo a son, Agreus. Euboea's possible sister was Megaclite, consort of Zeus.
- Euboea, a Thespian princess as one of the 50 daughters of King Thespius and Megamede or by one of his many wives. When Heracles hunted and ultimately slew the Cithaeronian lion, Euboea and her other sisters, except for one, all lay with the hero in a night, a week or for 50 days as their father strongly desired. Euboea bore Heracles a son, Olympus.
