= Pelasgus =

Ancient Greek male name

In Greek mythology, Pelasgus (Ancient Greek: Πελασγός, romanized: Pelasgós) was the eponymous ancestor of the Pelasgians, the mythical inhabitants of Greece who established the worship of the Dodonaean Zeus, Hephaestus, the Cabeiri, and other divinities. In the different parts of the country once occupied by Pelasgians, there existed different traditions as to the origin and connection of Pelasgus. Some ancient Greeks believed that he was the first man.

== Inachid Pelasgoí of Argos ==
In Argos, several Inachid kings were called Pelasgus:

- Pelasgus, brother to Apis both sons of Phoroneus, is said to have founded the city of Argos in Peloponnesus, to have taught the people agriculture, and to have received Demeter, on her wanderings, at Argos, where his tomb was shown in later times.
- Pelasgus, son of Triopas and Sois, and a brother of Iasus, Agenor, and Xanthus. He was the father of Larissa who bore to Poseidon three sons with one named after his grandfather (see below Pelasgus). According to Greek legends, he founded the sanctuary of Demeter in Argos and for this reason she was worshipped at this temple under the name Pelasgian Demeter.
- Pelasgus, also known as Gelanor, son of Sthenelas or Arestor.

== Arcadian Pelasgus ==
- Pelasgus, either an autochthon, or a son of Zeus by Niobe (and in the latter case brother of Argus) or of Arestor (son of Iasus or Ecbasus). The Oceanide Meliboea, the nymph Cyllene, or Deianeira, became by him the mother of Lycaon and Temenus. According to Hellenistic version of the myth, Pelasgus coming from Argos, civilized the hitherto savage natives of Arcadia and founded the city of Parrhasia.
- Pelasgus, son of Arcas.

== Thessalian Pelasgoí ==
- Pelasgus, an Argive prince as son of Poseidon and Larissa, daughter of the Pelasgus, son of Triopas. Together with his brothers Phthius and Achaeus, they left Achaean Argos with a Pelasgian contingent for Thessaly. They then established a colony on the said country naming it after themselves: Pelasgiotis, Phthiotis and Achaea. Pelasgus was also the founder of the Thessalian Argos. He was also said to be the father of Phrastor by the nymph Menippe. Pelasgus is also said to have been the ancestor of the Tyrrhenians through the following lineage: Pelasgus - Phrastor - Amyntor - Teutamides - Nanas. In the latter's reign, the Pelasgians were believed to have left Greece and to have settled in a new land that later came to be named Tyrrhenia.
- Pelasgus, father of Chlorus and grandfather of Haemon or the father of Haemon and grandfather of Thessalus instead. He may be the same man with the above Pelasgus.

== Homeric Pelasgus ==
- In the Iliad, Homer characterizes Pelasgus as brave, and lists the Pelasgians as allies of the Trojans, fighting against the tribes of Greeks in the Trojan War.
- Pelasgus, father of Hippothous, one of the Trojan leaders who fought alongside the Dardanians and other allies defending the walls of the city of Troy. In some accounts Hippothous' father was called Lethus, son of the above Teutamides.

== Other character ==
- Pelasgus, also called Pelagon, son of the river-god Asopus by the naiad Metope, daughter of the river Ladon. He was brother to Aegina, Salamis, Thebe, Corcyra, Tanagra, Thespia, Cleone, Sinope, Peirene, Asopis, Ornea, Chalcis, Harpina, Ismene, and Ismenus. His sisters were abducted by various gods as punishment for their father's deed.

== See also ==
- Pelasgia
