= Plataea (mythology) =

In Greek mythology, Plataea (/pləˈtiːə/; Ancient Greek: Πλάταια) was a (naiad) daughter of the river-god or king of Plataea, Asopus. She is possibly the same with another daughter of Asopus called Oeroe (Ὠερόη), the naiad of a stream in Plataea that also bears her name.

== Family ==
Plataea's mother was probably the naiad, Metope, daughter of another river-god Ladon. As one of Asopus’ daughters, she was sister to Harpina, Cleone, Corcyra, Nemea, Salamis, Tanagra, Thespia, Thebe and Aegina.

Together with her last two sisters, they were abducted by Zeus with only Aegina mentioned to bore Aeacus to the said god.

== Mythology ==
Plataea had a sanctuary at Plataeae, which according to some derived its name from her, but according to others from the πλάτη τῶν κωπῶν (platē tōn kōpōn).
