= Ornea =

In Greek mythology, Ornea or Ornia (Ancient Greek: Ὀρνία, lit. 'bird-like' or 'of a bird') was the eponym of Orneae, a town in Argolis. Otherwise, it is attributed to Orneus, the Athenian son of King Erechtheus.

== Family ==
Ornia was one of the daughters of the river-god Asopus and Metope, the river-nymph daughter of the river Ladon. She was the sister of Pelasgus, Ismenus, Corcyra, Salamis, Aegina, Pirene, Cleone, Thebe, Tanagra, Thespeia, Asopis, Sinope, Chalcis and Harpina.
