= Chalcis (mythology) =

Daughter of Asopus in Greek mythology

In Greek mythology, Chalcis (/ˈkælsɪs/ KAL-siss; Ancient Greek: Χαλκίς, romanized: Chalkís or Khalkis) was one of the daughters of the river-god Asopus and Metope, the river-nymph daughter of the river Ladon.

== Family ==
Chalcis was the sister of Pelasgus (Pelagon), Ismenus, Corcyra, Salamis, Aegina, Peirene, Cleone, Thebe, Tanagra, Thespia, Asopis, Sinope, Ornea and Harpina. According to others, she was the mother of the Curetes and Corybantes, the former of whom were among the earliest inhabitants of Chalcis.

== Mythology ==
The town of Chalcis in Euboea was said to have derived its name from Chalcis. She may be identical with Euboea or Combe, daughters of Asopus in some myths.
