= Salamis (mythology) =

Nymph in Greek mythology

Salamis (/ˈsæləmɪs/ SAL-ə-miss; Ancient Greek: Σαλαμίς, romanized: Salamís, lit. 'place amid salt water') was a nymph in Greek mythology, the daughter of the river-god Asopus.

== Family ==
Salamis’ mother was Metope, daughter of Ladon, another river god. She was sister to Corcyra, Sinope, Aegina, Peirene, Cleone, Thebe, Tanagra, Thespia, Asopis, Ornea, Chalcis (Euboea), Harpina, Antiope, Nemea, Plataea (Oeroe), Pelagon (Pelasgus) and Ismenus.

== Mythology ==
Along with her sisters Corcyra and Euboea, Salamis also shared their fate after they were all carried away by Poseidon from their father. The god took her to the island which was named after her by Cychreus, their son who became the first king of the island.

In some accounts, she became the mother of Saracon by Zeus.
