= Corcyra (mythology) =

Daughter of the Asopos river and the nymph Metope

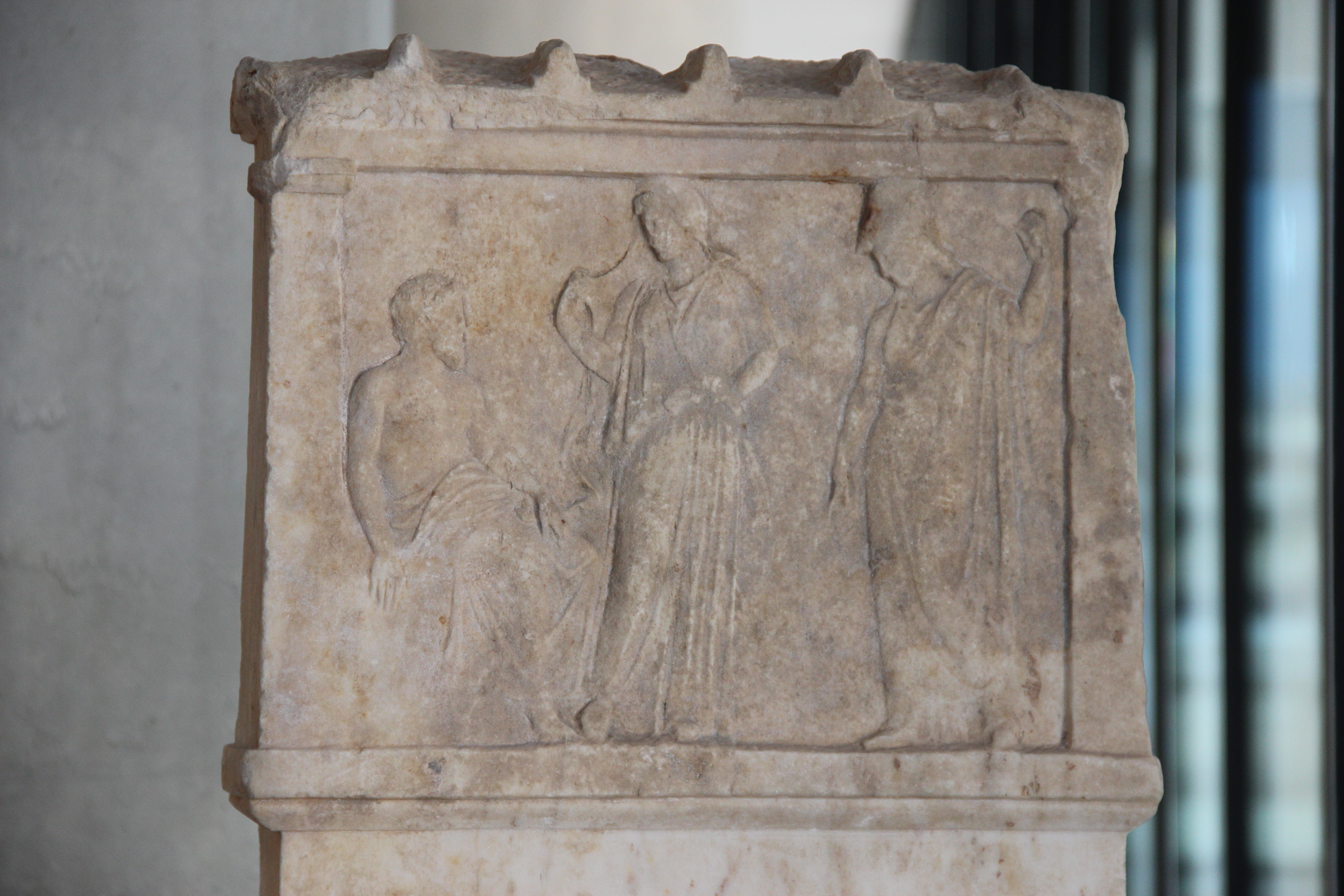
- Corcyra (or Hera) on the relief of the Corcyra-Athens alliance, 375 BC, Acropolis Museum
- Abode: Corfu

Genealogy
- Parents: Asopus (father); Metope (mother)
- Consort: Poseidon
- Children: Phaeax

In Greek mythology and religion, Corcyra (/kɔːrˈsaɪərə/) or Korkyra (/kɔːrˈkaɪərə/; Ancient Greek: Κόρκυρα, romanized: Kórkura or Kórkyra) is the naiad daughter of the river-god Asopos and the nymph Metope, herself the daughter of the river-god Ladon. She is the personification and tutelary goddess of the ancient Greek city and island of Korkyra, now better known as Corfu.

== Family ==
Korykra was the sister of Pelasgus (Pelagon), Ismenus, Chalcis, Cleone, Salamis, Sinope, Aegina, Peirene, Thebe, Tanagra, Thespia, Asopis, Ornea, Harpina, Antiope, Nemea and Plataea (Oeroe).

== Mythology ==
According to myth, Poseidon fell in love with the beautiful nymph Korkyra, kidnapped her and brought her to a hitherto unnamed island (Scheria) and offered her name to the place: Korkyra or the now-modern Kerkyra (known in English as Corfu, a name that is unrelated by origin).

"Next after them they came to Corcyra, where Poseidon settled the daughter of Asopus, fair-haired Corcyra, far from the land of Phlious, whence he had carried her off through love; and sailors beholding it from the sea, all black with its sombre woods, call it Corcyra the Black."

Together they had a child Phaeax after whom the inhabitants of the island, Phaiakes, were named; their name was later transliterated in Latinate orthography to Phaeacians.
