= Asopis =

Two women in Greek mythology

Asopis (Ancient Greek: Ἀσωπίς, romanized: Asōpís, lit. 'daughter of Asopus') was the name of two women in Greek mythology.

- Asopis, one of the naiad daughters of the river-god Asopus and Metope, the nymph daughter of the river Ladon. She was sister to Pelasgus (Pelagon), Ismenus, Chalcis, Corcyra, Salamis, Sinope, Aegina, Peirene, Thebe, Tanagra, Thespia, Ornea and Harpina.
- Asopis, a Thespian princess as one of the 50 daughters of King Thespius and Megamede or by one of his many wives. When Heracles hunted and ultimately slayed the Cithaeronian lion, Asopis with her other sisters, except for one, all laid with the hero in a night, a week or for 50 days as what their father strongly desired it to be. Asopis bore Heracles a son, Mentor.
