= Nemea (mythology) =

Character of Greek mythology

In Greek mythology, Nemea (/ˈniːmiə/; Ancient Greek: Νεμέα or Νεμέαν means 'wooded district') was the eponymous nymph of Nemea, a district between Cleonae and Phlius in Argolis. She is sometimes depicted bringing water to Heracles after his fight with the Nemean Lion.

== Family ==
Nemea was one of the daughters of the river-god Asopus and possibly Metope, the river-nymph daughter of the river Ladon. She was the sister of Salamis, Aegina, Corcyra, Thebe, Antiope, Cleone, Harpina, Plataea (Oeroe), and Tanagra. In one of Aeschylus's plays, she is the mother of Archemoros.

In some account, Nemea's parentage is attributed to Zeus and Selene, the goddess of the moon.
