= Cleone (mythology) =

In Greek mythology, Cleone (Ancient Greek: Κλεώνη, romanized: Kleônê or Kleonē, lit. 'glorious', 'glory' or 'fame') or Cleonai (Κλεωναὶ, Kleonai) was one of the daughters of the river-god Asopus and possibly Metope, the river-nymph daughter of the river Ladon. She was the sister of Pelasgus (Pelagon), Ismenus, Chalcis, Corcyra, Salamis, Sinope, Aegina, Peirene, Thebe, Tanagra, Thespia, Asopis, Ornea and Harpina.

The city of Cleonae in Argos was said to be named after her, otherwise from Cleones, son of Pelops.
