= Parnassa =

Character in Greek mythology

In Greek mythology, Parnassa was one of Ares' lovers. Ares and Parnassa were the parents of Sinope. In some accounts, the latter's mother was Aegina or her parents could be the river-god Asopus and Metope, daughter of another river-deity, Ladon.
