= Ismene (Asopid) =

Daughter of Asopus in Greek mythology

In Greek mythology, Ismene (/ɪsˈmiːniː/; Ancient Greek: Ἰσμήνη, romanized: Ismēnē or Ismênê, lit. 'knowledgeable' or 'knowing') was the daughter of the river-god Asopus by the nymph Metope, daughter of the river Ladon. She was the sister of Aegina, Salamis, Pelagon (Pelasgus) and Ismenus. Ismene was the wife of Argus, eponymous king of Argos and thus, mother of Argus Panoptes and Iasus.
