= Tanagra (mythology) =

Niad-nymph of Hermes

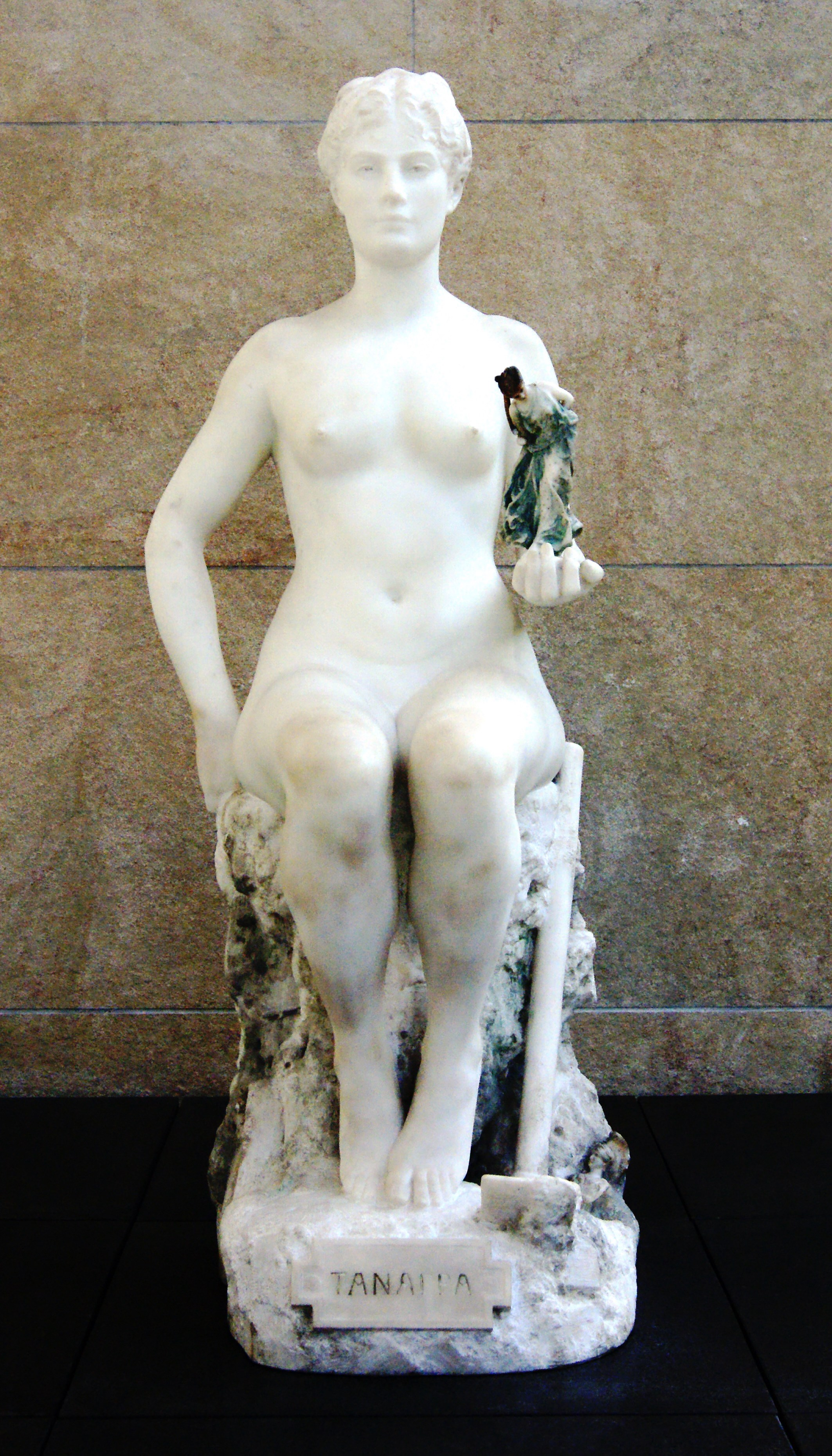
Statue of Tanagra in the Musée d'Orsay by Jean Léon Gérome

In Greek mythology, Tanagra (/ˈtanəgrə/; Ancient Greek: Τανάγρα or Τάναγραν) was a naiad or nymph and the namesake of the ancient city of Tanagra in Boeotia, Greece.

She was of such great beauty that both the god of war Ares and the god of thieves, Hermes fell for her. To win the right to be her lover they both participated in a boxing match where Hermes won and carried her off to the city of Tanagra, which was named for her, and made her an immortal oread or naiad, depending on versions.

== Family ==
Tanagra's father was either Aeolus or the river god Asopus. Her mother was named as the nymph Metope, a daughter of the river god Ladon. She had two brothers: Pelasgus, and Ismenus, and eleven sisters: Korkyra, Salamis, Aegina, Pirene, Cleone, Thebe, Thespeia, Asopis, Sinope, Ornia, Chalcis.

== Mythology ==
Tanagra married Poemander, and together they had two sons: Leucippus and Ephippus. Poemander founded the city of Tanagra in Boeotia, which he named after his wife.
