= Asterope (mythology) =

Multiple figures in Greek mythology

In Greek mythology, Asterope (/æˈstɛrəpiː/; Ancient Greek: Ἀστερόπη, romanized: Asterópē, lit. 'star-voiced') may refer to the following characters:

- Asterope, one of the 3,000 Oceanids, water-nymph daughters of the Titans Oceanus and his sister-spouse Tethys. She was the mother of Acragas by Zeus.
- Asterope, a Hesperid.
- Asterope or Sterope, one of the Pleiades.
- Asterope, mother of Circe and possibly Aeëtes by Helios, according to some.
- Asterope or Sterope, daughter of Cepheus, King of Tegea.
- Asterope or Hesperia, the wife or desired lover of Aesacus and daughter of the river-god Cebren.
- Asterope, the Boeotian mother of Peneleos by Hippalcimus.

== Classical literature sources ==
Chronological listing of classical literature sources for Asterope:

- Hesiod, The Astronomy (trans. Evelyn-White) (Greek poetry C8th or C7th BC)
- Pseudo-Apollodorus, The Library 3. 10. 1 (trans. Frazer) (Greek mythography C2nd AD)
- Scholiast on Pseudo-Apollodorus, The Library 3. 10. 1 (Apollodorus, The Library trans. Frazer 1921 Vol 2 p. 4)
- Pseudo-Apollodorus, The Library 3. 12. 5 (trans. Frazer) (Greek mythography C2nd AD)
- Pseudo-Hyginus, Fabulae 84 (trans. Grant) (Roman mythography C2nd AD)
- Pseudo-Hyginus, Fabulae 97
- Stephanus Byzantium, s.v. Akragantes (ed. Meinekii) (Byzantinian mythography C6AD)
- Scholiast on Stephanus Byzantium, s.v. Akragantes (A Dictionary of Greek and Roman Biography and Mythology ed. Smith 1870 Vol 1 p. 11)
