= Oenone (mythology) =

In Greek mythology, Oenone (/ɪˈnoʊniː/; Ancient Greek: Οἰνώνη, romanized: Oinṓnē, lit. 'wine woman') may refer to the following characters:

- Oenone, an oread of Mount Ida in the Troad and daughter of the river god Cebren. She was the first wife of Paris before he abandoned her for Helen of Sparta.
- Oenone, one of the Maenads, who followed Dionysus in the Indian War.
- Oenone, the nymph mother of Melantheus, one of the Indian chiefs who supported Dionysus in his conflict against Poseidon concerning Beroe.
