= Locrus =

Several figures in Greek mythology

In Greek mythology, the name Locrus or Lokros (/ˈlɒkrəs/; Ancient Greek: Λοκρός) may refer to:

- Locrus, the king of Locris and son of his predecessor King Physcius. He was the grandson of Amphictyon, son of Deucalion. Locrus became by Cabya the father of Opus, the mythical ancestor of the Ozolian Locrians. According to some, his wife was called Cambyse or Protogeneia. Locrus named the Lelegians Locrians after himself.
- Locrus, son of Zeus and Maera, the daughter of Proetus of Corinth. He is said to have assisted Zethus and Amphion in the building of Thebes. In some accounts, his mother was called Megaclite, daughter of Macareus and had a sister Thebe who married Zethus.
- Locrus, son of Phaeax and brother of Alcinous who emigrated to Italy where he married Laurina, the daughter of Latinus. Herakles at about that time was driving Geryon's beautiful cows from Erytheia. He arrived and was hosted kindly by Lokros. Latinus came to visit his daughter, saw and fancied the cows and drove them away. Discovering this, Herakles shot with his bow and killed him, and brought back the cows. Lokros, fearing Herakles might suffer something terrible at the hands of Latinus, who was strong in body and spirit, had hastened to the aid of his guest, having put on military gear. Herakles seeing him running and thinking he was someone rushing to support Latinus, loosed a shaft and killed him. After he learned he mourned loudly and conducted the rites for him. And when he had passed from among men he appeared to the people as a ghost and ordered them to establish a city by the tomb of Lokros. And the city keeps the name in honor of Lokros.
- Locrus, also a Parian statuary, of unknown date whose statue of Athena in the temple of Ares, at Athens, is mentioned by Pausanias.
