= Alexirhoe (mythology) =

Alexiroe, Alexirhoe or Alexirrhoe (Ancient Greek: Ἀλεξιρόη or Ἀλεξιῥῤόη, romanized: Alexirhoē or Alexirrhoē, lit. 'averting flow' or 'defending the stream') is a name in Greek mythology that may refer to following women:

- Alexirrhoe, the naiad of Mount Ida and daughter of the two-horned river god Granicus. She secretly bore the seer Aesacus to King Priam of Troy on the 'shady ridges of Mt. Ida' . Otherwise, the mother of Aesacus was called Arisbe, daughter of King Merops of Percote.
- Alexirrhoe, mother of Carmanor by Dionysus.
