= Thisbe (nymph) =

In Greek mythology, Thisbe (Ancient Greek: Θίσβη) was a Boeotian nymph, from whom the town of Thisbe derived its name. She may be the naiad of the spring, well or fountain of that town.

There is a story in Greek mythology about two lovers Pyramus and Thisbe which the poet Ovid makes use of in Metamorphoses and this is related to an earlier tragic love story in which both lovers die and the gods take pity on them, so that Thisbe becomes a spring and Pyramus a river.

Ovid's version was adapted by Giovanni Boccaccio in On Famous Women and in his Decameron, and in English in the 1380s by Geoffrey Chaucer, in his The Legend of Good Women, and John Gower, in his Confessio Amantis, and by Shakespeare in Act V, sc 1 of A Midsummer Night's Dream.
