= Harpina (city) =

Ancient town in Elis, Greece

Coordinates: 37°38′56″N 21°40′29″E

Harpina (Ancient Greek: Ἆρπινα or Ἅρπινα) or Harpinna (Ἅρπιννα) was an ancient town of Pisatis in Elis, Greece situated on the right bank of the Alpheius, on the road to Heraea, at the distance of 20 stadia from the hippodrome of Olympia. Harpina is said to have been founded by a son of Ares, Oenomaus, who gave it the name of his mother, a nymph who was daughter of Asopus. The ruins of the town were seen by Pausanias. According to Strabo, Harpina stood upon the stream Parthenius; according to Pausanias, upon one called Harpinates.

The site of Harpina is tentatively located among ruins lying north of the village of Miraka (now called Archea Pisa).
