= Hesperia (mythology) =

People and places in Greek mythology

In Greek mythology, Hesperia (Ancient Greek: Ἑσπερία) or Hesperie (Ἑσπερίη), may refer to the following characters and places:

People

- Hesperia, one of the Hesperides; in some versions, the daughter of the king of Mauretania, Atlas and Hesperis.
- Hesperia, also called Asterope, the wife or desired lover of Aesacus and daughter of the river Cebren

Places

- Hesperia as "western land" is the ancient Greek name of Italy, also used in Latin epic poetry in gender either a feminine noun or a neuter plural adjective used substantively, spelt the same but with different definite articles, and with the accent shifted from the penult to the antepenult. This becomes Latin Hesperia or Hesperius, the latter not a distinct nominal form, but simply an adjective used substantively, viz. Vergil's Aeneid VI, 6.
- Hesperia, the Iberian Peninsula and Northwest Africa, further to the west, used in both Ancient Greek and Byzantine sources.
