= Combe (mythology) =

Daughter of Greek god

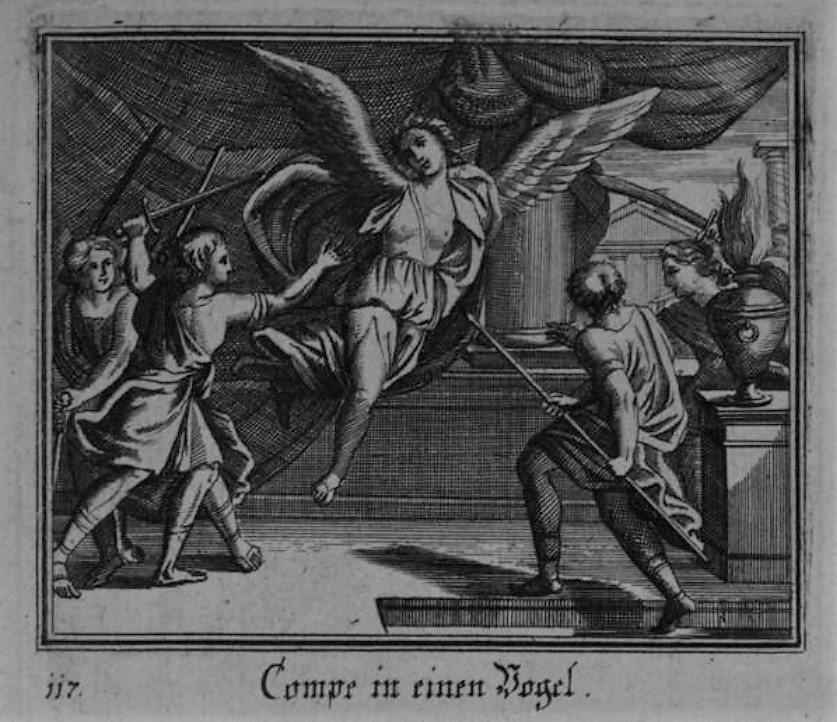
Ovid Metamorphoses – Combe changing to the bird, engraving, ca. 1700

In Greek mythology, Combe (Ancient Greek: Κόμβη) was a daughter of the river god Asopus.

== Mythology ==
Combe was equated with Chalcis, another of Asopus' many daughters, and associated with the island Euboea: the city Chalcis was reported to have been named after "Combe, who was also called Chalcis". Combe was said to have been dubbed Chalcis because she made bronze weapons (χαλκόν chalcon being the Greek word for "bronze"); the mythological tradition also makes her the first woman to cohabit with a man, and mother of one hundred children.

In Nonnus' Dionysiaca, Combe is the consort of the Euboean Socus and mother by him of the seven Corybantes. She and her sons get expelled from the island by Socus and move first to Knossos and then to Athens. The Corybantes return to Euboea after King Cecrops, their host in Athens, kills Socus, but Combe's individual further destiny is not dealt with. Hesychius of Alexandria indicates Combe as "mother of the Curetes", these being barely distinct from the Corybantes.

Ovid briefly mentions a certain Combe of Pleuron, surnamed Ophias ("daughter or descendant of an Ophius"?), who "on fluttering wings escaped the wounds that were being inflicted by [or on?] her sons", that is, was apparently changed into a bird to escape a danger. Since the myth is otherwise unknown, it remains uncertain whether this Combe is the same character or a different one.
