= Damocrateia =

Daughter of Zeus in Greek mythology

According to a fragment of the historian Pythaenetus, Damocrateia (Ancient Greek: Δαμοκράτεια) was the daughter of Aegina and Zeus, and the sister of Aeacus, the king of the island of Aegina. She became the mother of Menoetius by Actor.
