= Phyllis (river god) =

River-god in Greek mythology

In Greek mythology, Phyllis (Ancient Greek: Φύλλις, romanized: Phúllis, lit. 'leaves', 'foliage' or 'greenery') was the god of the homonymous river in Bithynia. By a local meadow nymph, he became father of a son Dipsacus, who led a pastoral lifestyle by his father's river and was remembered for having been hospitable to Phrixus on the latter's way to Colchis.
