= Aesacus =

Figure in Greek mythology

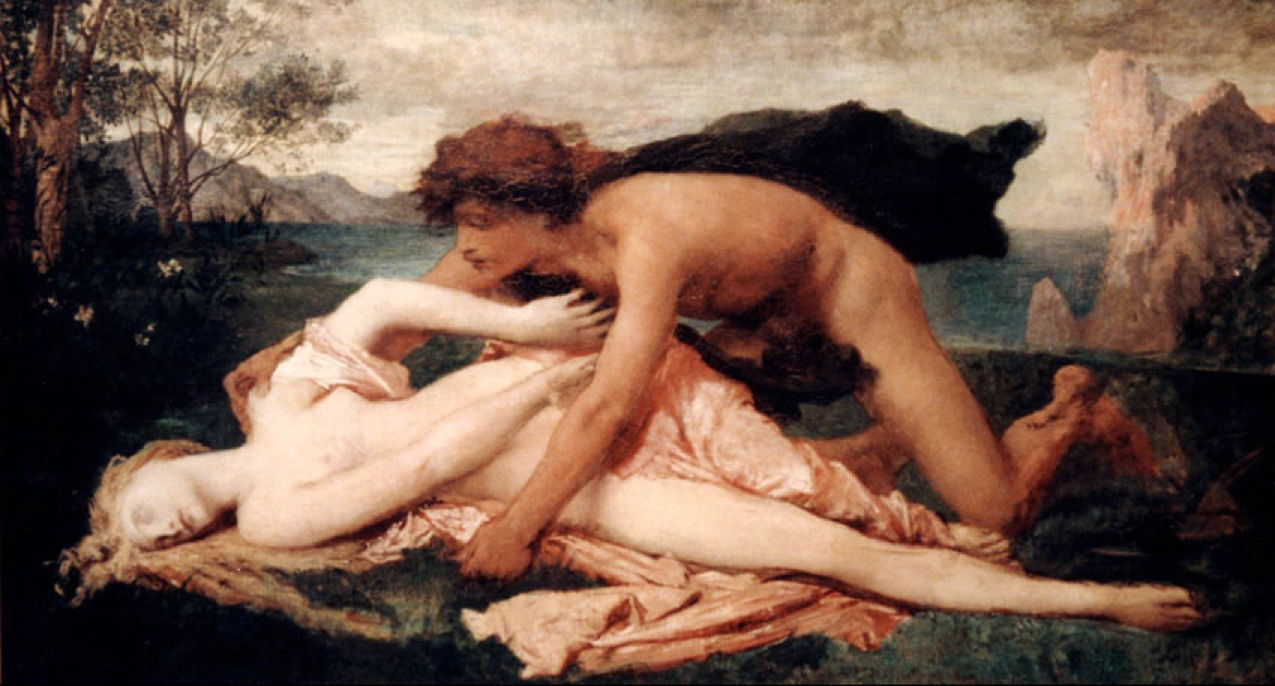
The death of the Nymph Hesperia by Elie Delaunay.

In Greek mythology, Aesacus or Aisakos (/ˈiːsəkəs/; Ancient Greek: Αἴσακος) was a son of King Priam of Troy. Aesacus sorrowed for the death of his wife or would-be lover, a daughter of the river Cebren, and was transformed into a seabird.

== Mythology ==
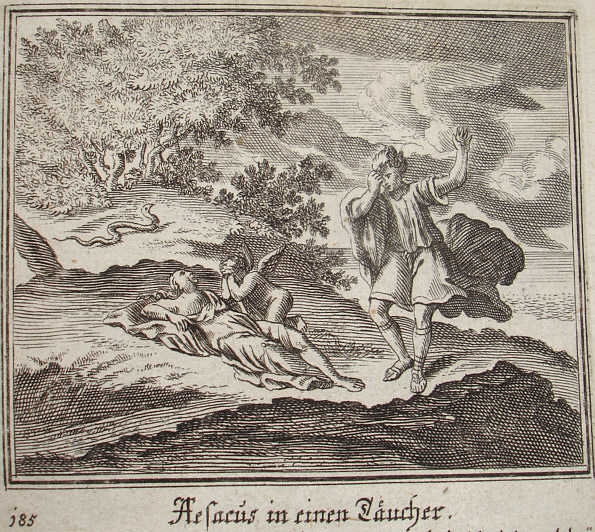
Aesacus and Hesperia, engraving by Johann Ulrich Krauss for a 1690 edition of Ovid's Metamorphoses Book XI, 771–776.

=== Apollodorus' account ===
The Bibliotheca makes Aesacus son of Priam's first wife Arisbe, daughter of Merops. Apollodorus and Tzetzes also make Aesacus a seer who has learned the interpretation of dreams from his grandfather Merops. For them Aesacus is the interpreter of Hecabe's dream when Hecabe gives birth to Paris. In Apollodorus the deceased daughter of Cebren for whom Aesacus mourns is his wife named Asterope.

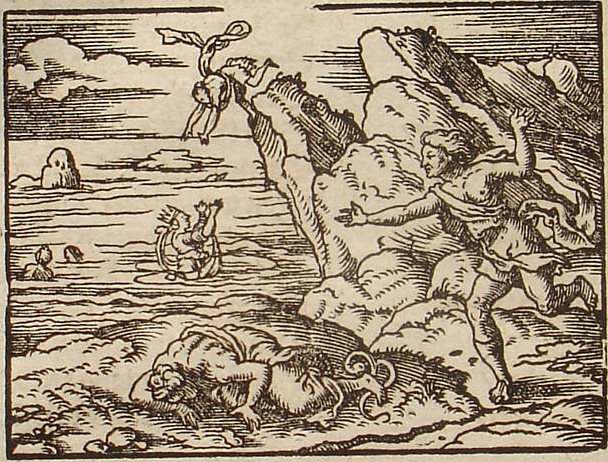
Aesacus and Hesperia, engraving by Virgil Solis for Ovid's Metamorphoses Book XI, 749–795.

=== Ovid's account ===
In Ovid's Metamorphoses, Aesacus is an illegitimate son of King Priam secretly born to the nymph Alexirhoe, daughter of the river Granicus. Aesacus avoids Ilium, preferring the countryside. One day he catches sight of the nymph Hesperia, daughter of the river Cebren, falls in love, and pursues her. However, as Hesperia flees, a venomous snake strikes her and she dies. Aesacus, unable to bear living any longer, leaps from a tall cliff into the sea but as he plunges he is changed into a bird by Tethys. Aesacus still attempts to dive into the depth yet continues still to live in the form of a diving bird. The exact identity of the bird, referred to as mergus (later taken as the genus name for merganser ducks) is now unknown, though it has been interpreted as either referring to a cormorant or to Scopoli’s shearwater.

== See also ==
- List of King Priam's children
