= Megaclite (mythology) =

In Greek mythology, Megaclite (/mɛɡəˈklaɪtiː/; Ancient Greek: Μεγακλείτη, romanized: Megakleítē, lit. 'great renown' or 'great glory') was the daughter of Macareus, king of Locris and possibly the sister of Euboea. She was the mother of Thebe and Locrus by Zeus.
