= Nomia (mythology) =

Nymph of ancient Arcadia

In Greek mythology, Nomia (/ˈnoʊmiə/; Νομία) was a nymph of Arcadia, where the local people believed the Nomian Mountains to have been named after her.

== Mythology ==
Nomia was apparently a companion of Callisto, the daughter of Lycaon: Pausanias mentions a painting of the two, with Callisto sitting on a bearskin and her feet lying on Nomia's knees; there is also Pero portrayed next to them. Nomia is also a name for a type of water goddess, many believe that she started off as nothing but a nymph until one day Callisto, decided to trade her love for a god status.

Nomia is also a possible name for the Sicilian nymph who loved Daphnis but was abandoned by him and, in revenge, blinded the young man and changed him into a rock.
