= Leches =

In Greek mythology, Leches or Lekhes (Ancient Greek: Λέχης) was the mortal son of Peirene and Poseidon.

== Mythology ==
Peirene, a nymph, was abducted by Poseidon and taken to the site that is now Corinth. He had one brother, Kenkhrias (or Cenchrias), also mortal. Together they founded the twin ports of Corinth, also Korinthos, in Southern Greece. Lekhaion and its harbor was named after him.

The town of Lechaion lasted about 1,000 years, from the sixth century B.C. to the sixth century A.D. But the area has suffered several large earthquakes which have damaged the harbor. It is now the site of historical excavations which reveal the importance of this place as a trading post in ancient Greece.
