= Laurinaitis =

- Lithuanian surname
- m.: Laurinaitis
- f.: (unmarried): Laurinaitytė
- f.: (married): Laurinaitienė

Laurinaitis is a Lithuanian surname that may refer to:

== Athletes ==
- Joe Laurinaitis (born 1960), former pro wrestler
- James Laurinaitis (born 1986), American football player, son of Joe
- John Laurinaitis (born 1962), executive and former wrestler, younger brother of Joe and Marcus, uncle to James
- Marcus Laurinaitis (born 1964), wrestler, younger brother of Joe, elder brother to John, uncle to James
