= Vrychonas =

- Native name: Βρύχωνας (Greek)

Location
- Country: Greece

Physical characteristics
- Mouth
  - location: Pagasetic Gulf
  - coordinates: 39.3196°N 23.0150°E

Vrychonas (Greek: Βρύχωνας) or Brychon (Ancient Greek: Βρύχων, English translation: "the roaring one") is a small river in Magnesia, Thessaly, Greece. It flows from Mount Pelion into the Pagasetic Gulf near Kato Lechonia. It has been attested under that name since antiquity, and is today known as the location of Greece's oldest bridge made of fortified concrete, constructed for a train line in 1895. Another river named Brychon is said by ancient sources to have been in the Sithonia peninsula in Chalcidice, Macedonia (Greece), near Pallini. According to ancient mythology, the river god of the same name was an ally of the Gigantes in their war against the gods, the Gigantomachy, which according to some sources took place at Pallene.
