= Celusa =

Mother of Asopus in Greek mythology

In Greek mythology, Celusa or Kelousa (Ancient Greek: Κηλοῦσαν or Κηλούσης Kelousê from kêloô ‘to have an abnormal delivery’) personified Mount Celusa or Celossa in Phliasia. She born the river-god Asopus to Poseidon. Otherwise, Celusa might be the same with Pero, the so called mother of the river-deity by the marine god.
