= Phaeax (mythology) =

Figure in ancient Greek mythology

In Greek mythology, Phaeax (Ancient Greek: Φαίαξ, lit. 'Phaeacian') may refer to two distinct characters:

- Phaeax, son of Poseidon and Korkyra (Cercyra), from whom the Phaeacians derived their name and became the ruler of their island of Scheria. He was the father of Alcinous and Locrus. When Phaeax died, his sons after quarreling, came together again on the basis that Alkinous would be king of Phaiakis, and Lokros would take the heirlooms and part of the ethnos to make a colony.
- Phaeax, a Salaminian who became Theseus' look-out man when he sailed to Crete. He and the pilot Nausithous were given by Scirus of Salamis as a favour to the hero since Scirus' grandson Menesthes was one of the chosen youths. This is supported by the heroons for Nausithous and Phaeax which Theseus built at Phalerum near the sanctuary of Scirus, and they say that the festival of the Cybernesia or Pilot's Festival is celebrated in their honour.
