= Thisbe (Boeotia) =

Coordinates: 38°15′35″N 22°58′06″E

Thisbe (Ancient Greek: Θίσβη), or Thisbae or Thisbai (Θίσβαι), was a town of Boeotia, described by Strabo as situated at a short distance from the sea, under the southern side of Mount Helicon, bordering upon the confines of Thespiae and Coroneia. Thisbe is mentioned in the Catalogue of Ships in the Iliad by Homer, who says that it abounds in wild pigeons – πολυτρήτρωνά τε Θίσβην; and both Strabo and Stephanus of Byzantium remark that this epithet was given to the city from the abundance of wild pigeons at the harbour of Thisbe. Xenophon remarks that Cleombrotus I marched through the territory of Thisbe on his way to Creusis before the Battle of Leuctra in 371 BCE.

== Description ==
The only public building at Thisbe mentioned by Pausanias was a temple of Heracles, to whom a festival was celebrated. The same writer adds that between the mountain on the sea-side and the mountain at the foot of which the town stood, there is a plain which would be inundated by the water flowing into it, were it not for a mole or causeway constructed through the middle, by means of which the water is diverted every year into the part of the plain lying on one side of the causeway, while that on the other is cultivated.

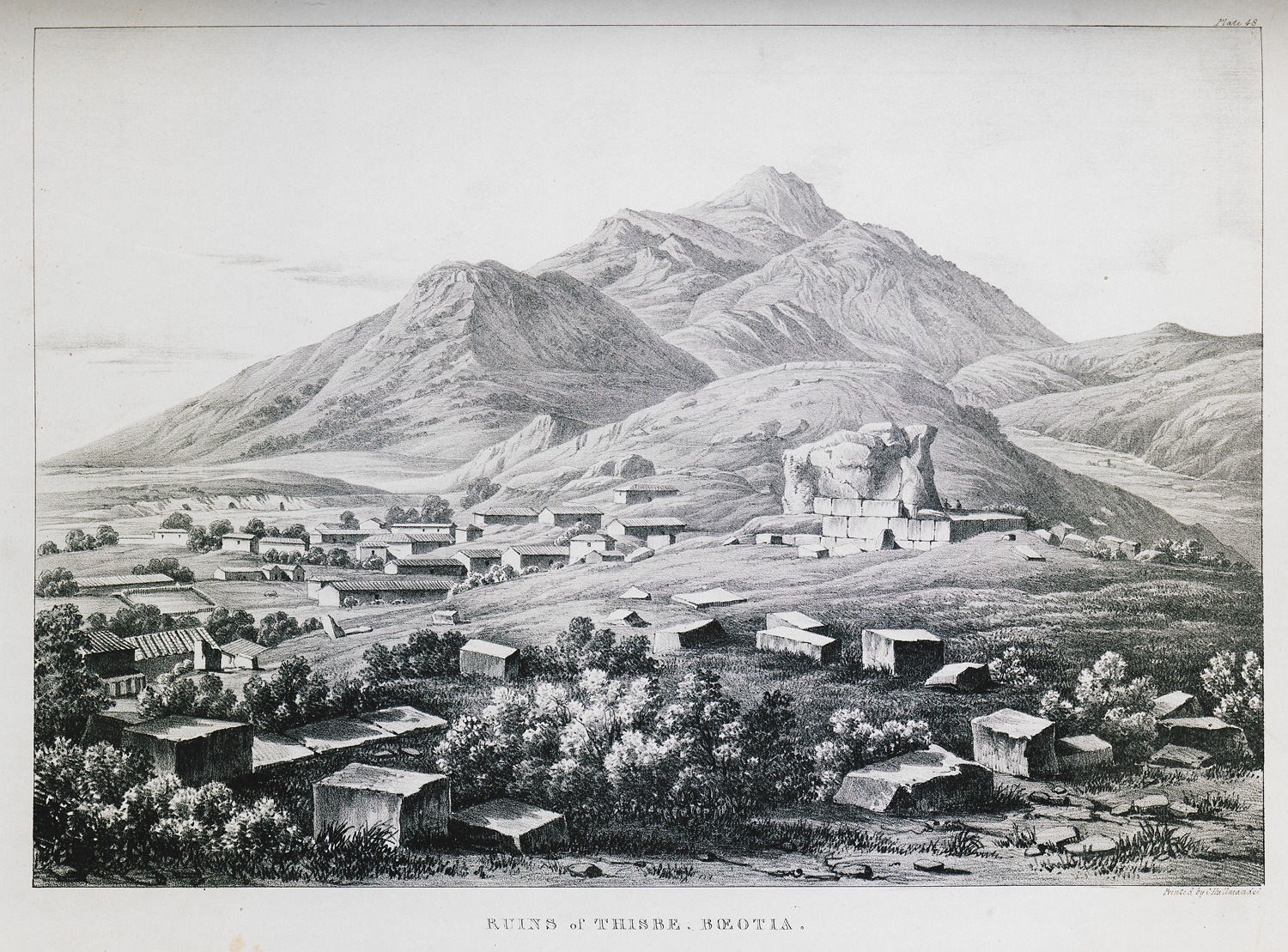
Ruins of Thisbe, Boeotia (1834) by Edward Dodwell

The ruins of Thisbe are found near modern Kakosi(a), itself renamed back to Thisbe in 1915. William Martin Leake visited the site in the 19th century and wrote: "The position is between two great summits of the mountain, now called Karamúnghi and Paleovuná, which rise majestically above the vale, clothed with trees, in the upper part, and covered with snow at the top. The modern village lies in a little hollow surrounded on all sides by low cliffs connected with the last falls of the mountain. The walls of Thisbe were about a mile [1.6 km] in circuit, following the crest of the cliffs which surround the village; they are chiefly preserved on the side towards Dobrená and the south-east. The masonry is for the most part of the fourth order, or faced with equal layers of large, oblong, quadrangular stones on the outside, the interior as usual being filled with loose rubble. On the principal height which lies towards the mountain, and which is an entire mass of rock, appear some reparations of a later date than the rest of the walls, and there are many Hellenic foundations on the face of this rock towards the village. In the cliffs outside the walls, to the northwest and south, there are many sepulchral excavations." Leake observed the mole or causeway which Pausanias describes, and which serves for a road across the marsh to the port. The same writer remarks that, as the plain of Thisbe is completely surrounded by heights, there is no issue for the river which rises in the Ascraea and here terminates. "The river crosses the causeway into the marsh by two openings, the closing of which in the winter or spring would at any time cause the upper part of the plain to be inundated, and leave the lower fit for cultivation in the summer; but as the river is now allowed to flow constantly through them, the western side is always in a state of marsh, and the ground has become much higher on the eastern side."

The port of Thisbe is now called Vathý. The shore is very rocky, and abounds in wild pigeons, as Strabo and Stephanus have observed; but there is also a considerable number at Kakosi itself. The Roman poets also allude to the pigeons of Thisbe. Hence Ovid speaks of the "Thisbaeae columbae," and Statius describes Thisbe as "Dionaeis avibus circumsona." Thisbe is mentioned both by Pliny the Elder and Ptolemy.
