= Metope (mythology) =

Nymph in Greek mythology

In Greek mythology, Metope (/mɪˈtoʊpiː/; Ancient Greek: Μετώπη, romanized: Metópē, lit. 'between openings' or 'middle of the opening') may refer to the following:

- Metope, the Arcadian naiad daughter of the river god Ladon, thus sister to Daphne. Her waters were near the town of Stymphalus in the Peloponnesus. She married the river god Asopus by whom she had several (either 12 or 20) daughters, including Aegina, Salamis, Thebe, Corcyra, Tanagra, Thespia, Cleone, Sinope, Peirene, Asopis, Ornea, Chalcis, Harpina and Ismene; and sons, including Pelagon (Pelasgus) and Ismenus. The question of the exact parentage of these children of Asopus is very vague.
- Metope, a daughter of the above Asopus in some accounts.
- Metope, consort of the river god Sangarius. Some say these were the possible parents of Hecuba. She may be identical or different from the above Metope.
- Metope, an Epirotan princess as the daughter of King Echetus. She had an intrigue with a lover and as a punishment her father mutilated the lover and blinded Metope by piercing her eyes with bronze needles. He then incarcerated her in a tower and gave her grains of bronze, promising that she would regain her sight when she had ground these grains into flour. Eustathius and the scholia on this passage call the daughter and her lover Amphissa and Aechmodicus (Αἰχμόδικος) respectively.
