= Pero (mythology) =

In Greek mythology, Pero (/ˈpɪroʊ, ˈpiːroʊ/; Ancient Greek: Πηρώ) may refer to the following women:

- Pero, consort of Poseidon who became the mother of Asopus, according to Acusilaus. She may be the same with Celusa, possible mother of Asopus by the same god.
- Pero, the beautiful daughter of Neleus.
- Pero, also known as Xanthippe, daughter of Myconus.

In Roman mythology, Pero is a woman who saves her imprisoned parent (mother or father, depending on the story version) from starvation by breastfeeding them.
