= Cebren =

Ancient Greek river god

In Greek mythology, Cebren (Ancient Greek: Κέβρην) was a Greek river-god, whose river was located near Troy. He was the son of Oceanus and Tethys and he was the father of Asterope and Hesperia, who are sometimes considered to be the same person, and Oenone. The city Cebrene (also spelled Kebrene or Kevrin) was named for Cebren.
