= Asopus =

Name of a Greek god and several rivers

Asopus or Asopos (/əˈsoʊpəs/; Ancient Greek: Ἀ̄σωπός, romanized: Āsōpos or Asôpos) is the name of four different rivers in Greece and one in Turkey. In Greek mythology, it was also the name of the gods of those rivers. Zeus carried off Aegina, Asopus' daughter, and Sisyphus, who had witnessed the act, told Asopus that he could reveal the identity of the person who had abducted Aegina, but in return Asopus would have to provide a perennial fountain of water at Corinth, Sisyphus' city. Accordingly, Asopus produced a fountain at Corinth, and pursued Zeus, but had to retreat for fear of Zeus' terrible thunderbolt.

== Rivers ==
=== The rivers in Greece ===
1. Asopos (Boeotia), a river of Boeotia originating on Mt. Cithaeron and flowing through the district of Plataea into the Euripus Strait.
2. Asopos (Corinthia) or Phliasian Asopus, originating in Phliasian territory and flowing through Sicyonian territory into the Gulf of Corinth near Sicyon. Pausanias mentions that Phliasians and Sicyonians claimed that its source was in fact the Phrygian and Carian river Maeander that purportedly descended underground where it appeared to enter the sea at Miletus and rose again in the Peloponnesos as Asopus.
3. Asopos (Thessaly) or Trachean Asopus, a river originating on Mount Oeta in Thessaly and emptying into the Malian Gulf near Thermopylae, mentioned by Herodotus (7.199, 216–17).
4. Asopus, a river in Corfu

=== The river in Turkey ===
1. Phrygian Asopus, a small river in Phrygia which joins the River Lycus near Laodicea on the Lycus.

== Mythology ==
As mythological entities, the Boeotian river Asopus and the Phliasian river Asopus are much confounded. They are duplicated a second time as supposed mortal kings who gave their names to the corresponding rivers. Indeed, logically, since the children fathered by gods on various daughters of either Boeotian or Phliasian Asopus were mortal in these tales, then the daughters themselves must have been mortal, and therefore either the mother of these daughters (often given as Metope daughter of river Ladon) or their father Asopus must have been mortal, or both of them.

The Bibliotheca informs that the river Asopus was a son of Oceanus and Tethys or, according to Acusilaus, of Poseidon by Pero (otherwise unknown to us), or according to yet others of Zeus by Eurynome; it is uncertain whether he knows there is more than one river named Asopus.

=== Phliasian Asopus ===
Pausanias writes that during the reign of Aras, the first earth-born king of Sicyonian land, Asopus, said to be son of Poseidon by Celusa (this Celusa otherwise unknown but possibly identical to Pero mentioned above), discovered for him the river called Asopus and gave it his name. Diodorus Siculus similarly presents Asopus (here son of Oceanus and Tethys) as a settler in Phlius and husband of Metope daughter of Ladon, presumably here and elsewhere the Arcadian river Ladon.

Pausanias mentions his daughter Nemea, eponym for the region of the same name (possibly the mother of Archemorus in Aeschylus' lost play Nemea). Pausanias and Diodorus Siculus also mention a daughter Harpina and state that according to the traditions of the Eleans and Phliasians, Ares lay with her in the city of Pisa and they had a son, Oenomaus, who Pausanias says founded the city of Harpina named after her, not far from the river Harpinates.

The Bibliotheca refers to Ismene daughter of Asopus who was wife of Argus Panoptes to whom she bore Iasus, the father of Io.

=== Mixed tales ===
==== Daughters of Asopus (Asopides) ====
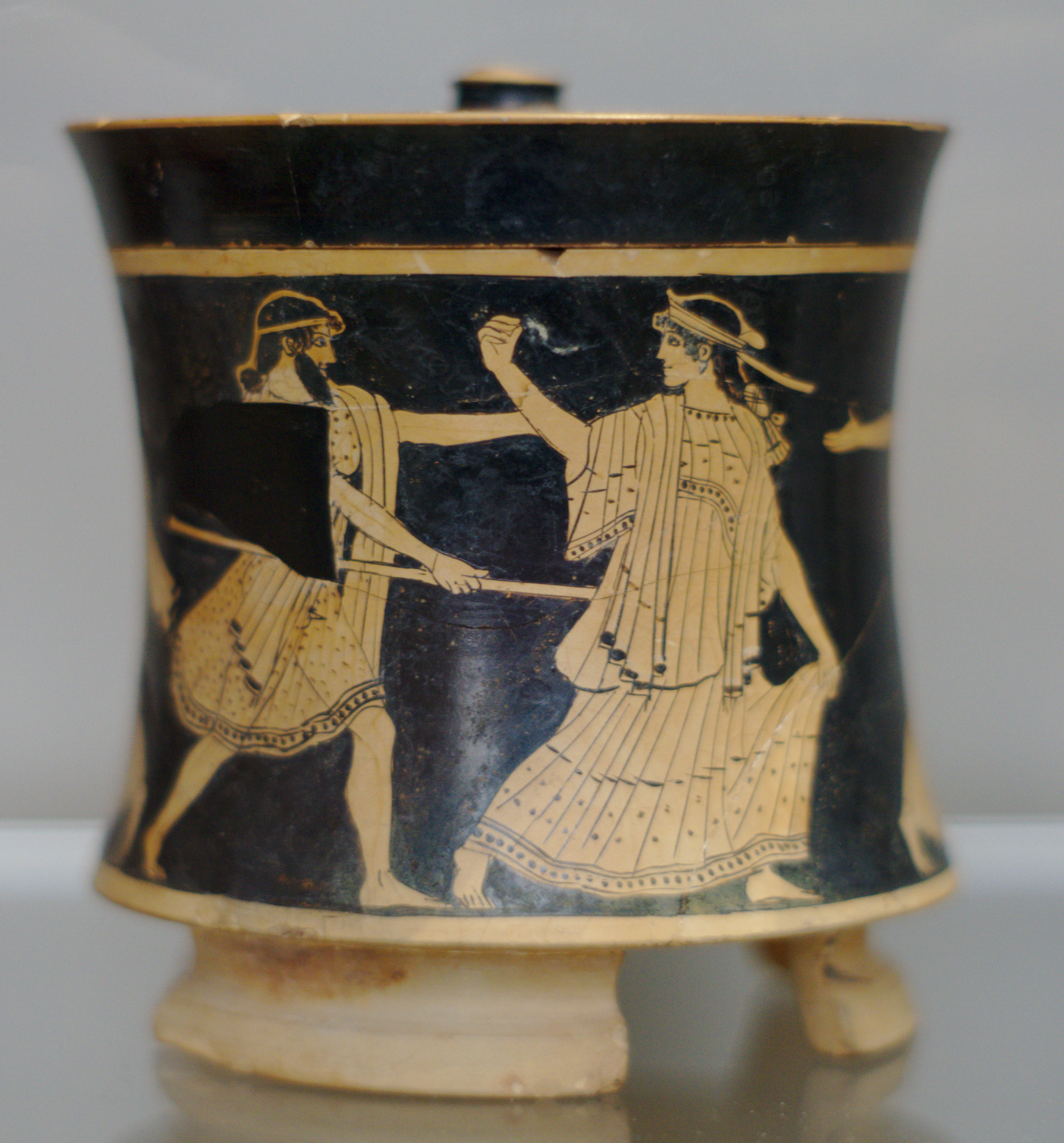
The abduction of Aegina, one of the daughters of Asopus, by Zeus. Attic red-figure pyxis, c.470–460 BC.

We find first in Pindar's odes the sisters, Aegina and Thebe, here the youngest daughters of Boeotian Asopus by Metope who came from Stymphalia in Arcadia. Both are abducted by the god Zeus, one carried to the island of Oenone later to be named Aegina and the other to Dirce's water to be queen there.

Corinna, Pindar's contemporary, in a damaged fragment, mentions nine daughters of Boeotian Asopus: Aegina, Thebe, and Plataea abducted by Zeus; Corcyra, Salamis, and Euboea abducted by Poseidon; Sinope and Thespia (who has been dealt with above) abducted by Apollo; and Tanagra abducted by Hermes. Asopus cannot discover what has become of them until the seer Acraephen (otherwise unknown) tells him that the gods Eros and Aphrodite persuaded the four gods to come secretly to his house and steal his nine daughters. He advises Asopus to yield to the immortals and cease grieving since he is father-in-law to gods. This hints that perhaps, for Corinna, Asopus himself is not a god. Asopus accepts Acraephen's advice.

Of these daughters, Thebe, Plataea, Thespia and Tanagra are properly Boeotian. Euboea is near Boeotia, but Salamis and Aegina are regions that would perhaps associate better with the Phliasian Asopus. Korkyra (Corfu) is definitely Corinthian rather than Boeotian. Sinope is surely the colony of Sinope on the Black Sea (founded from Miletus).

It is notable that tradition as it comes down to us does not record any children resulting from a union of gods with Thebe, Plataea, Thespia or Tanagra and only Diodorus mentions the otherwise unknown sons Phaiax, son of Poseidon by Corcyra, and Syrus sprung from Apollo by Sinope and that this child of Sinope is opposed by a conflicting tradition that Sinope tricked Zeus, Apollo and Halys and remained a virgin.

Later texts mostly indicate Zeus' abduction of Aegina, presented as a solitary abduction. Asopus is often clearly the Phliasian Asopus (so indicated by Pherecydes) but not always so. Asopus chases after Zeus and his daughter until Zeus turns upon him and strikes him with a thunderbolt, whence ever after Asopus is lame and flows very slowly, a feature ascribed to both the Boeotian and Phliasian Asopus. In these tales Asopus discovers the truth about the abduction from Sisyphus, King of Corinth in return for creating a spring on the Corinthian Acropolis. This spring, according to Pausanias was behind the temple of Aphrodite and people said its water was the same as that of the spring Peirene, the water in the city flowing from it underground.

Diodorus Siculus who, as mentioned, places his Asopus in Phlius, gives him twelve daughters. Diodorus' list omits the Plataea and Boeotia included by Corinna's list of nine daughters. But it introduces Chalcis which was the chief city of Boeotia and may represent Boeotia. To make up the twelve Diodorus' list also adds Peirene (the famous spring in Corinth), Cleone (possible eponym of the small city of Cleonae on the road from Corinth to Argos according to Pausanias), Ornia (possible eponym of the small town of Orneai south of Phlius), and Asopis. But Asopis may mean Asopian and be an epithet for one of the other known daughters. Ovid in his poem Metamorphoses twice calls Aegina by the name Asopis. Indeed, in his very next section Diodorus discusses Asopus' daughter Harpina who has been discussed above.

Apollodorus claims Asopus had twenty daughters but he does not provide a list.

Pausanias mentions three supposed daughters of Phliasian Asopus named Corcyra, Aegina, and Thebe according to the Phliasians and notes additionally that the Thebans insist that this Thebe was daughter of the Boeotian Asopus. He mentions no dispute about the others which suggests that in his time the assignment of Aegina to the Phliasian Asopus was generally admitted.

Pausanias also describes a group sculpture in the sanctuary of Hippodamia at Olympia donated by the Phliasians. It included Nemea, Zeus seizing Aegina, Harpina, Corcyra, Thebe, and Asopus himself. It seems the Phliasians were insistent that Thebe belonged to their Asopus.

According to Pherecydes, Asopus also fathered Philyra who became the mother of Hypseus by Peneus. In some sources, Pronoe who was the mother of Phocus by Poseidon was a daughter of Asopus.

A scholiast to the Odyssey names Rhode as a daughter of Asopus, who in this version is mother of Phaethon and three Heliades, here named Aigle, Lampetia and Phaethusa.

==== Sons of Asopus ====
Both Apollodrus and Diodorus also mention two sons of Asopus, the first named Ismenus and the second named Pelagon (by Apollodorus) or Pelasgus (by Diodorus). Nothing else has survived about this Pelagon. Of Ismenus, Diodorus states only that he emigrated to Boeotia and settled near the Boeotian river, which was afterwards named Ismenus from his name. Another son, Hypseus who fought in the war of the Seven against Thebes was killed by Capaneus.

Comparative table of Asopus' family
Relation	Names	Sources													
Relation	Names	(Sch) on Hom.	Acu.	Cori.	(Sch.) on Pin.	(Sch.) on Bacc.	Herod.	Apollon.	Dio.	Stat.	Apollod.	Pau.	Hyg.	Anto.	Non.
Parentage	Poseidon and Pero		✓								✓				
Parentage	Oceanus and Tethys								✓		✓				
Parentage	Zeus and Eurynome										✓				
Parentage	Poseidon and Celusa											✓			
Wife	Metope			✓	✓				✓		✓				
Children	Antiope	✓													
Children	Pronoe	✓													
Children	Aegina			✓	✓	✓	✓		✓	✓	✓	✓	✓	✓	✓
Children	Euboea			✓											
Children	Corcyra			✓	✓	✓		✓	✓			✓			
Children	Plataea			✓								✓			
Children	Salamis			✓	✓				✓		✓	✓			
Children	Sinope			✓		✓		✓	✓						
Children	Tanagra			✓					✓			✓			
Children	Thebe			✓	✓	✓	✓		✓			✓			
Children	Thespia			✓					✓			✓			
Children	Cleone				✓	✓			✓			✓			
Children	Harpina				✓	✓			✓			✓			
Children	Nemea				✓	✓						✓			
Children	Philyra				✓										
Children	Peirene					✓			✓						
Children	Oeroe						✓					✓			
Children	Ismenus								✓		✓				
Children	Chalcis								✓						
Children	Asopis								✓						
Children	Ornia / Oenia								✓						
Children	Pelasgus								✓						
Children	Hypseus									✓					
Children	Pelegon										✓				
Children	Ismene										✓				
Number of daughters mentioned		1	-	9	7	8	3	2	13	1	3 + 17 others	11	1	1	1
