= Pirene (nymph) =

Daughter of Asopus in Greek mythology

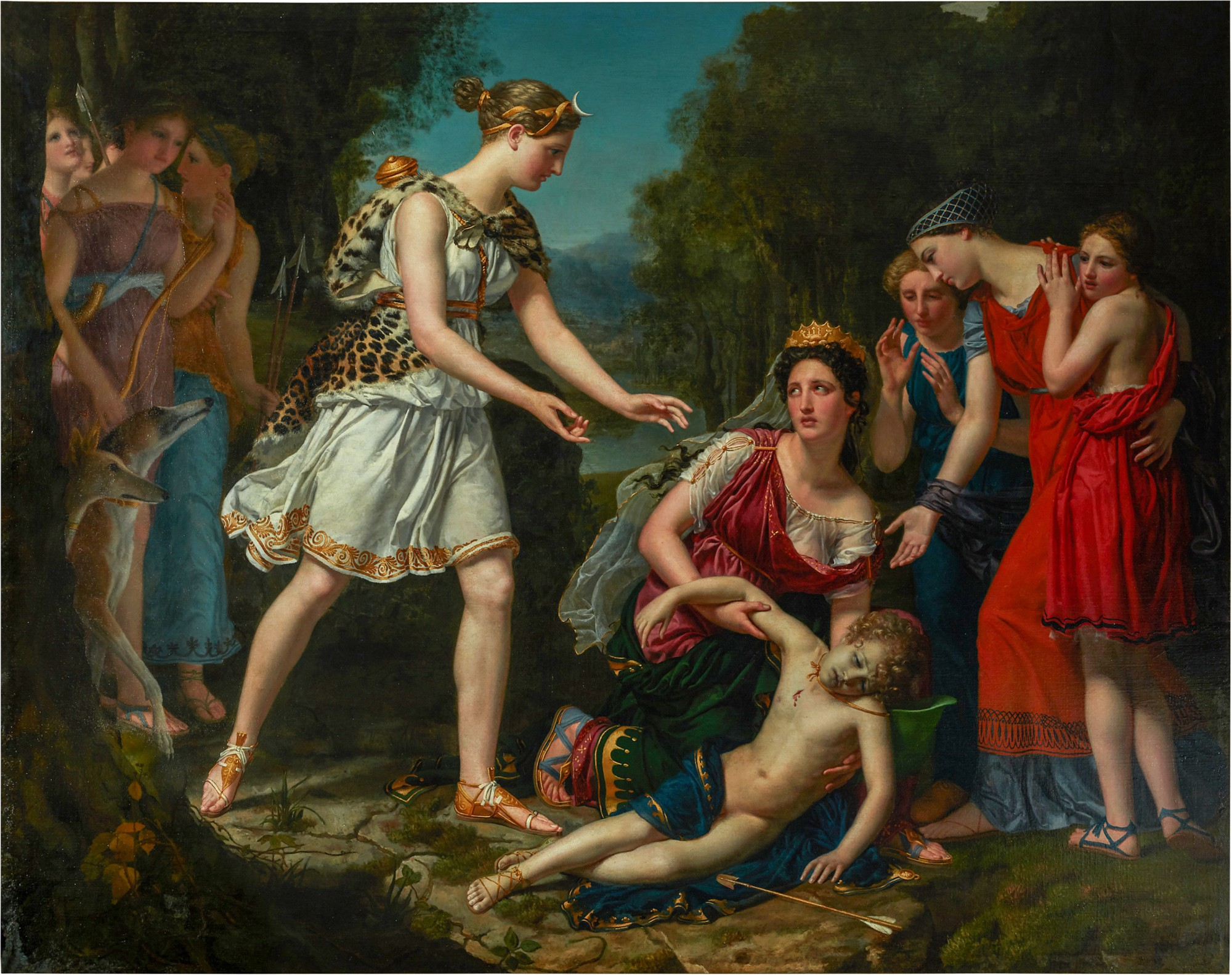
Sophie Rude, The Death of Cenchirias, son of Neptune and the nymph Peirene, 1821-1823

In Greek mythology, Pirene or Peirene (Ancient Greek: Πειρήνη, romanized: Peirēnē, lit. 'of the osiers' or 'made of wicker/ willow-twigs'), a nymph, was either the daughter of the river god Asopus, Laconian king Oebalus, or the river god Achelous, in different sources. By Poseidon she became the mother of Lecheas and Cenchrias.

== Mythology ==
When her son Cenchrias was unintentionally killed by Artemis, Pirene's grief was so profound that she became nothing but tears and turned into the fountain outside the gates of Corinth. The Corinthians had a small sanctuary dedicated to Pirene by the fountain where honey-cakes were offered to her during the dry months of early summer.

The fountain was sacred to the Muses and it was there that Bellerophon found Pegasus (as Polyidus had claimed), drinking, and tamed him.
