= Harpina =

Daughrer of Asopus in Greek mythology

In Greek mythology, Harpina (/ˈhɑːrpɪnə/; Ancient Greek: Ἅρπινα) was a daughter of Phliasian Asopus and of Metope.

== Mythology ==
According to the tradition of the Eleans and Phliasians, Ares mated with Harpina in the city of Pisa (located in the ancient Greek region of Elis). The couple were the parents of Oenomaus, the king of Pisa. The latter founded and named after his mother the city of Harpina, not far from the river Harpinates, near Olympia. Pausanias mentions Harpina in his description of a group sculpture, donated by the Phliasians, of the daughters of Asopus, which included Nemea, Zeus seizing Aegina, Harpina, Corcyra, Thebe and Asopus. The sculpture was located in the sanctuary of Hippodamia at Olympia.
