= Thebe (mythology) =

Multiple figures in Greek mythology

Thebe (Ancient Greek: Θήβη, romanized: Thēbē; pronounced /ˈθiːbiː/, THEE-beh or THAY-bay) is a feminine name mentioned several times in Greek mythology, in accounts that imply multiple female characters, four of whom are said to have had three cities named Thebes after them:

- Thebe, eponym of Thebes, Egypt. She was the daughter of either Nilus, Proteus, or Libys, son of Epirus. In another account, Thebe was called the daughter of Zeus and Iodame and was given in marriage to Ogygus by her father after Deucalion’s flood. She was the sister of another Deucalion. One rare version of the myth makes Thebe a consort of Zeus and mother of Aegyptus and/or Heracles.
- Thebe, daughter of the river god Boeotian Asopus, and the Arcadian naiad Metope (daughter of the river god Ladon), who was said to have consorted with Zeus. Amphion and Zethus named Boeotian Thebes after her because of their kinship, the twins being sons of her sister Antiope by Zeus. Egyptian Thebes was also named after her.
- Thebe, daughter of Zeus and Megacleite and sister of Locrus, the man who assisted Amphion and Zethus in the building of Thebes. She later on married Zethus and the Boeotian Thebes was named after her.
- Thebe, daughter of Prometheus, and also a possible eponym of the Boeotian Thebes.
- Thebe, daughter of Cilix and thus, sister of Thasus. By Corybas, son of Cybele, she was the possible mother of Ida who begat Minos II by King Lycastus of Crete. This Thebe is possibly the eponym of Cilician Thebe.
- Thebe, daughter of the Pelasgian Adramys, the eponym of Adramyttium or of the river god Granicus. She married Heracles, who named Hypoplacian Thebes after her.
- Thebe, an Amazon.
- Thebe, alternate name for the Titaness Phoebe.

== See also ==
- Thebe (disambiguation)
