= Sinope (mythology) =

Daughter of Asopus in Greek mythology

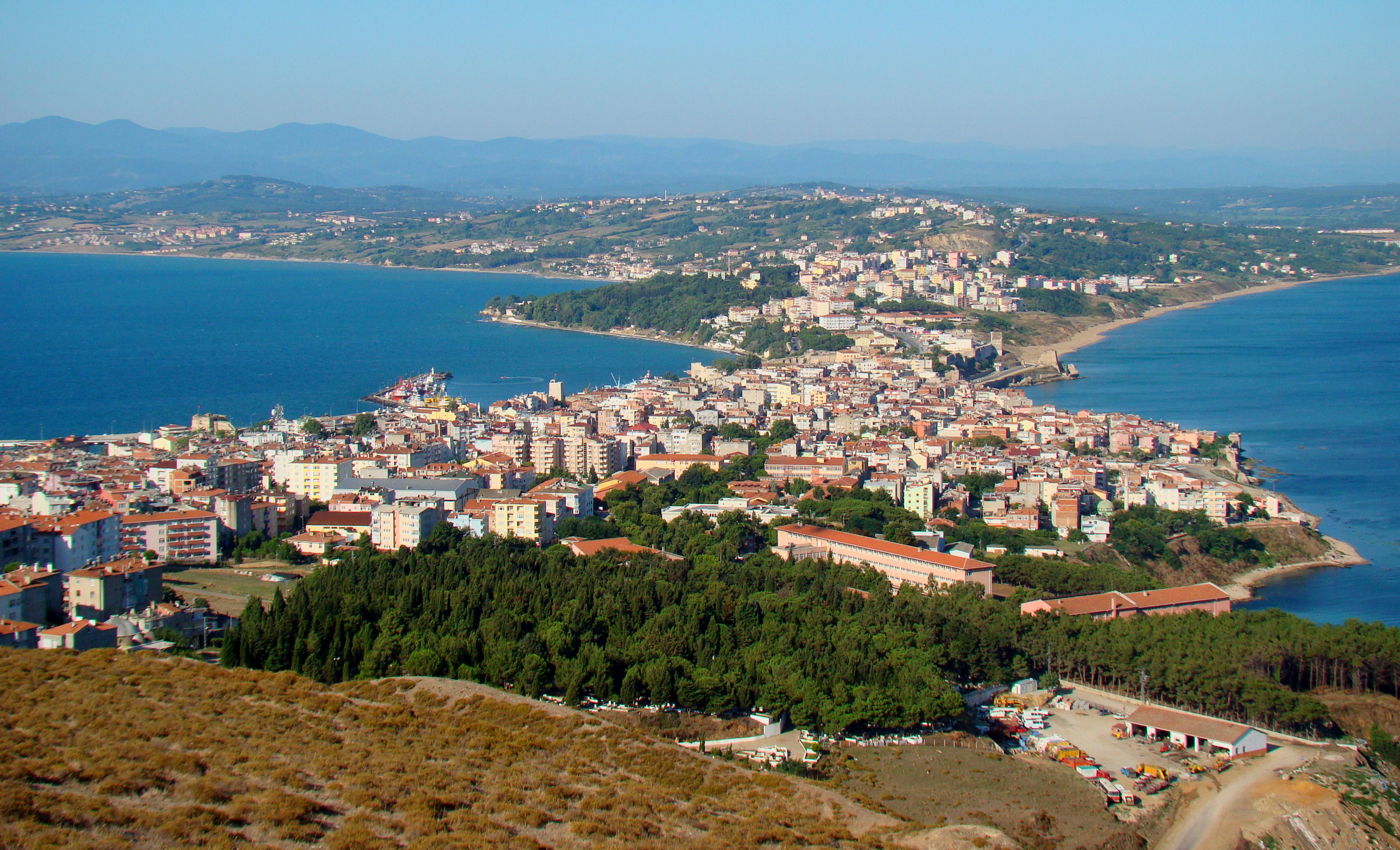
Sinop in Turkey, Black Sea coast.

In Greek mythology, Sinope (/sɪˈnoʊpi/; Ancient Greek: Σινώπη, romanized: Sinōpē) was a daughter of Asopus (a river god) and the eponym of the city Sinope on the Black Sea's south coast. Sinope is connected romantically to two gods, Apollo and Zeus.

== Family ==
Sinope's mother was Metope, daughter of the river-god Ladon. In one account, she was called the daughter of Ares and Parnassa. In the account of her being the offspring of Ares, Sinope was probably one of the Amazons.

== Mythology ==
According to Corinna and Diodorus Siculus, Sinope was carried away by the god Apollo to the place where later stood the city honouring her name. Diodorus adds that she bore to Apollo a son named Syrus, supposedly afterwards king of the Syrians, who were named after him.

However, Apollonius of Rhodes and Valerius Flaccus both relate that Sinope was abducted to the site by Zeus, who, in his passion, swore to fulfil her dearest wish. Sinope declared she wished to remain a virgin, so Zeus had to leave her alone. Sinope later tricked Apollo and the river Halys in the same fashion and remained a virgin all her life.
