= Ismenus =

Set of mythological Greek characters

In Greek mythology, the name Ismenus (Ancient Greek: Ἰσμηνός, romanized: Ismênos or Ismēnós) or Ismenius (Ἰσμήνιος, Ismênios or Ismēnios) may refer to:

- Ismenus or Ismenius, son of Oceanus and Tethys, god of the river of the same name. He was mentioned as the father of several spring nymphs, including Dirce and Strophia, also Crocale and the musician Linus. In Statius' Thebaid, the river god Ismenus gets involved in the war of the Seven against Thebes: he attempts to raise his waters against Hippomedon in revenge for the death of Crenaeus, son of his daughter Ismenis by Pan, but has to withdraw his attack at the request of Zeus.
- Ismenus, son of Asopus and Metope, eponym of River Ismenus in Boeotia, on the banks of which he settled.
- Ismenus, one of the Niobids.
- Ismenus, also spelled Ismenius, son of Apollo and the Oceanid Melia, brother of the seer Tenerus, and an alternate eponym of River Ismenus, which is said to have previously been known as Ladon.
