= Thespia (mythology) =

In Greek mythology, Thespia or Thespeia (Ancient Greek: Ancient Greek: Θέσπια, lit. 'divine inspiration') was the daughter of the river god Asopus and Metope, daughter of Ladon, himself a river god. She was abducted to Thespiae (the city west of Thebes) by Apollo, and the city might have been named after her.

== Quote from Pausanias ==
They say that Thespia was a daughter of Asopus, who gave her name to the city, while others say that Thespius, who was descended from Erechtheus, came from Athens and was the man after whom the city was called.
