= Aegina (mythology) =

Nymph in Greek mythology

- Eponymous Nymph of Aegina
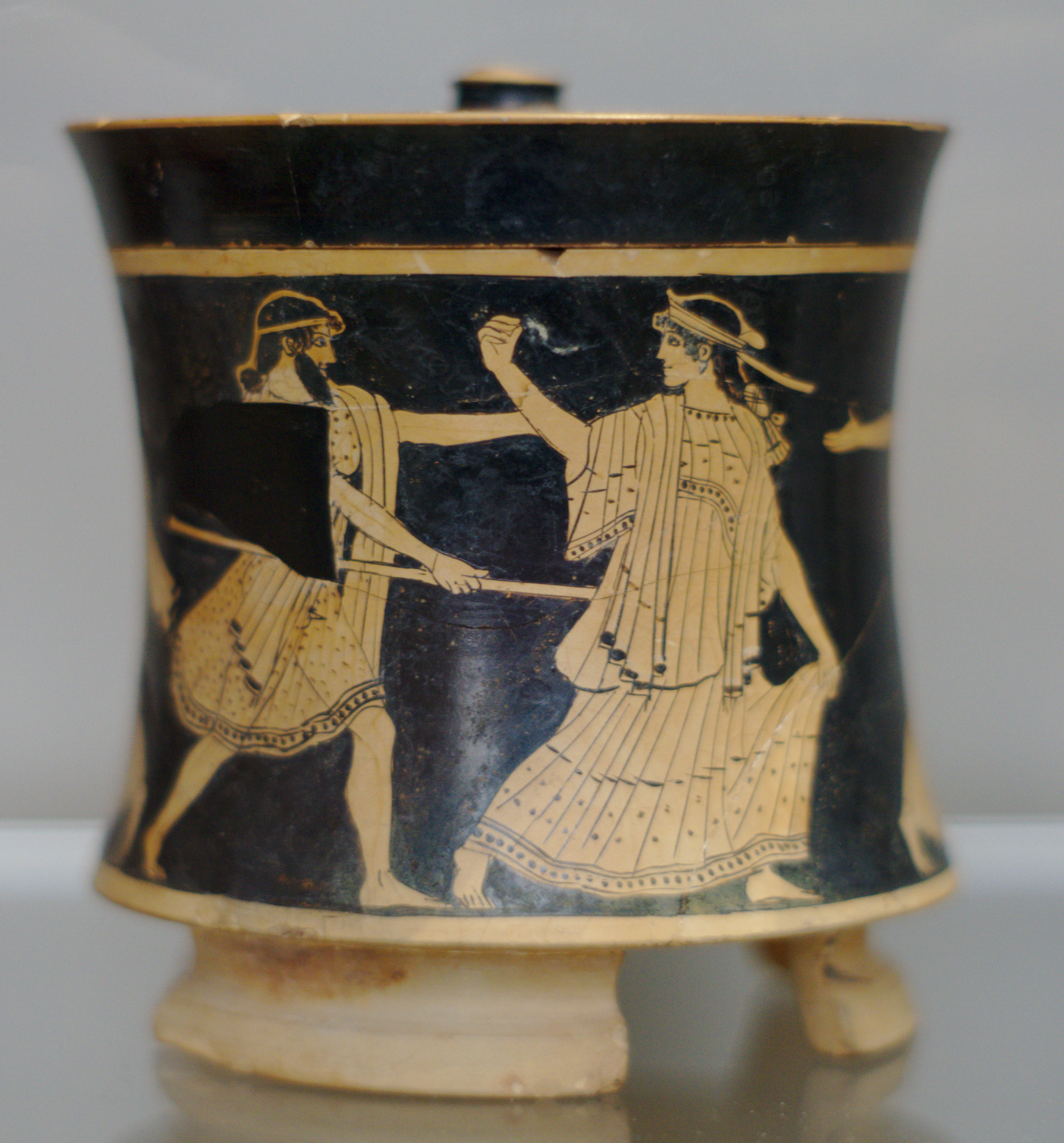
- Attic red-figure pyxis showing Zeus chasing Aegina
- Abode: Phlius, later Aegina
- Parents: Asopus and Metope
- Offspring: Aeacus and Damocrateia, or Menoetius, or Sinope

Aegina (/iˈdʒaɪnə/; Ancient Greek: Αἴγινα) was a figure of Greek mythology, the nymph of the island that bears her name, Aegina, lying in the Saronic Gulf between Attica and the Peloponnesos. The archaic Temple of Aphaea, the "Invisible Goddess", on the island was later subsumed by the cult of Athena. Aphaia (Ἀφαῖα) may be read as an attribute of Aegina that provides an epithet, or as a doublet of the goddess.

== Family ==
Though the name Aegina betokens a goat-nymph, such as was Cretan Amalthea, she was given a mainland identity as the daughter of the river-god Asopus and the nymph Metope; of their twelve or twenty daughters, many were ravished by Apollo or Zeus. Aegina bore at least two children: Menoetius by Actor, and Aeacus by Zeus, both of whom became kings. A certain Damocrateia, who married Menoetius, was also called her daughter by Zeus.

The mortal son Menoetius was king of Opus, and was counted among the Argonauts. His son was Patroclus, Achilles' first cousin once removed through their paternal family connection to Aegina, and his lover.

The son made immortal, Aeacus, was the king of Aegina, and was known to have contributed help to Poseidon and Apollo in building the walls of Troy. Through him, Aegina was the great-grandmother of Achilles, who was son of Peleus, son of Aeacus.

In one account, Aegina was also called the mother of Sinope by Ares. Otherwise, she was usually her sister; both were daughters of Asopus.

== Mythology ==
=== Abduction ===
According to Apollodorus and Pindar, Aegina was abducted by Zeus, with Ovid adding that he did so in the form of a flame; he then took her to an island near Attica, then called Oenone, henceforth known by her name. Aegina's father Asopus chased after them; his search took him to Corinth, where Sisyphus was king. Sisyphus, having chanced to see a great bird bearing a maiden away to a nearby island, informed Asopus. Though Asopus pursued them, Zeus threw down his thunderbolts sending Asopus back to his own waters. Aegina eventually gave birth to her son Aeacus, who became king of the island.

=== Myrmidons ===
When the island of Aegina was depopulated by a plague sent by Hera who poisoned the wells in jealous reprisal for Zeus's love of Aegina, the king Aeacus prayed to Zeus for the ants that were currently infesting an oak tree to morph into humans to repopulate his kingdom. Thus the myrmidons were created.

== Gallery ==
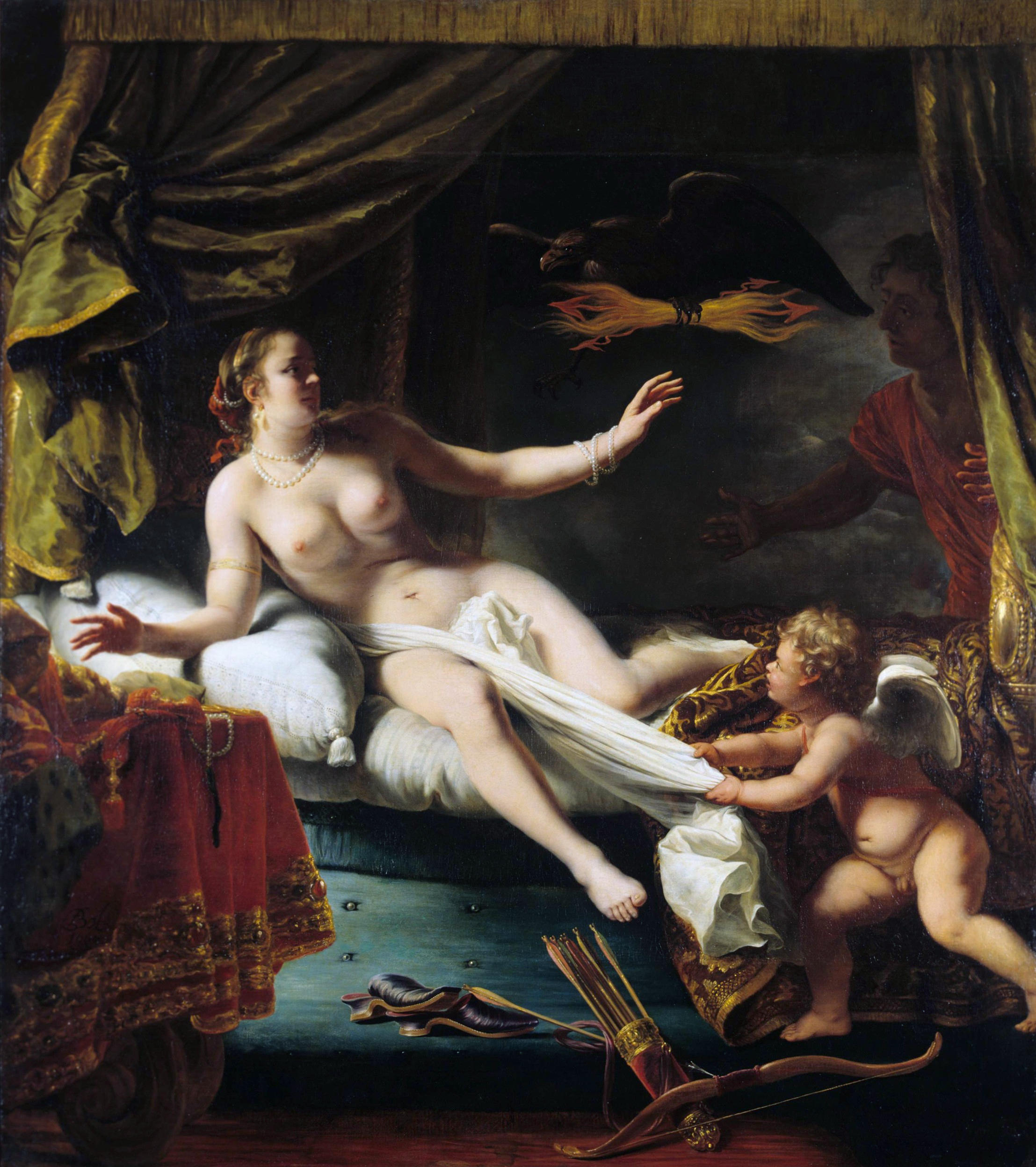
Aegina is waiting for the arrival of Zeus by Ferdinand Bol

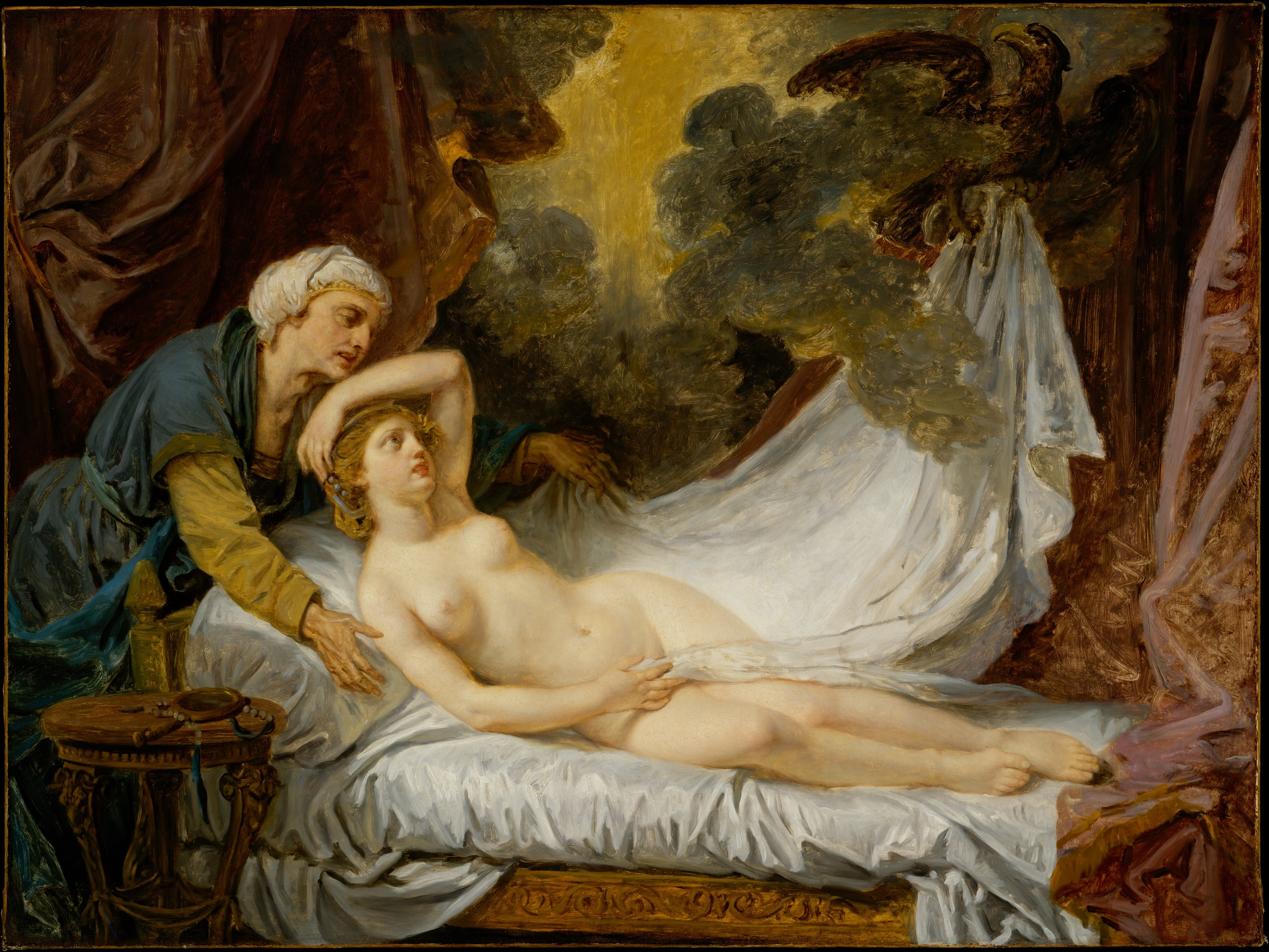
Aegina visited by Jupiter by Jean-Baptiste Greuze

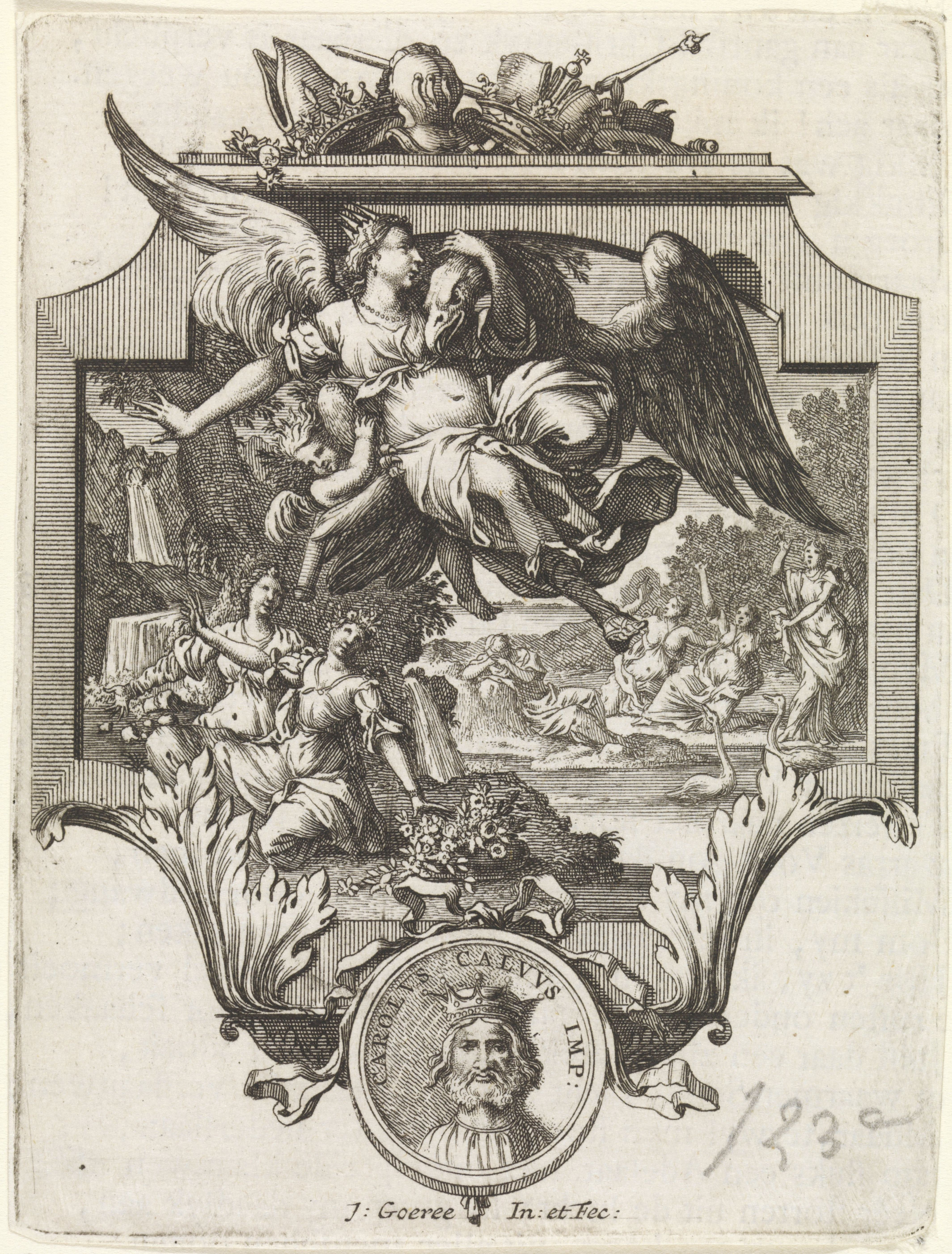
Jupiter and Aegina by Jan Goeree

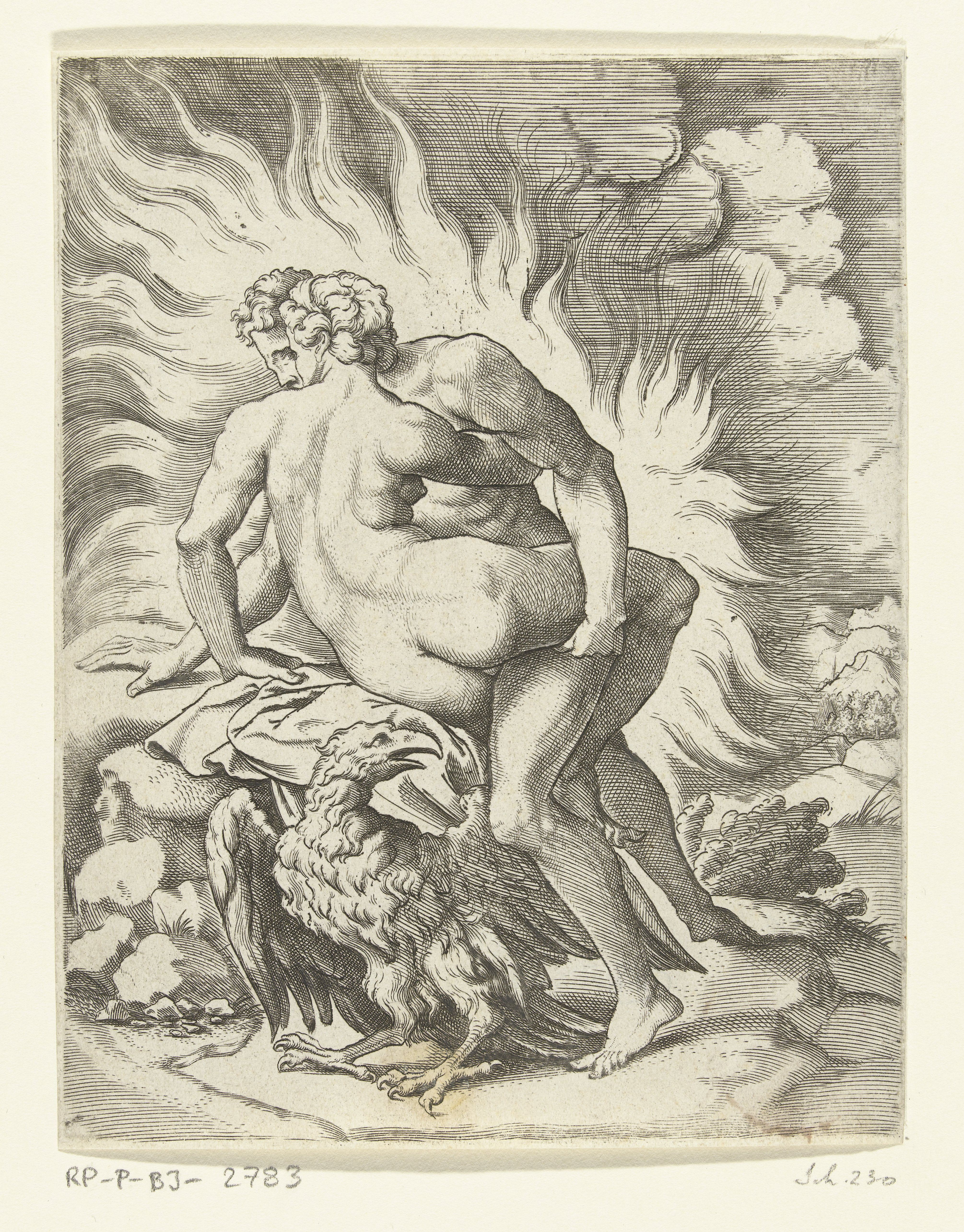
Jupiter and Aegina by Cornelis Bos
