= River gods (Greek mythology) =

River gods in Greek mythology

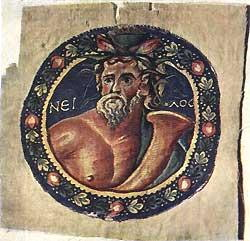
Nilus, the potamos of the Nile River, depicted in a Coptic tapestry

In ancient Greek religion and mythology, rivers (Ancient Greek: ποταμοί, romanized: potamoí) were often personified as deities, and in a number of ancient Greek cities river gods were the subject of local worship. In Hesiod's Theogony, the river gods are the offspring of the Titans Oceanus and Tethys, and the brothers of the Oceanids. In Greek mythology, river deities – such as Inachus, Scamander, and Peneus – are often progenitors of local genealogical lines.

In the Iliad, there are references to sacrifices being made to river deities, including the sacrifice of ephebes' hair. During military campaigns into foreign territory, there is evidence of sacrifices having been made to rivers upon their crossing. River deities could also be invoked as witnesses to an oath.

Depictions of river deities in ancient Greek art often combine anthropomorphic features with bull-like elements such as horns.

== Mythology ==
The river gods were the 3000 sons of the great earth-encircling river Oceanus and his wife Tethys and the brothers of the Oceanids. They were also the fathers of the Naiads. The river gods were depicted in one of three forms: a man-headed bull, a bull-headed man with the body of a serpent-like fish from the waist down, or as a reclining man with an arm resting upon an amphora jug pouring water.

Notable river gods include:

- Achelous, the god of the Achelous River, the largest river in Greece, who gave his daughter in marriage to Alcmaeon, and was defeated by Heracles in a wrestling contest for the right to marry Deianira.
- Alpheus, who fell in love with the nymph Arethusa, pursuing her to Syracuse, where she was transformed into a spring by Artemis.
- Asopus, father of many naiads. His daughter Aegina was carried off to the island Aegina by Zeus. Another daughter, Sinope, tricked three amorous gods into leaving her virginity intact.
- Inachus, the first king of Argos and progenitor of the Argive line through his son Argus.
- Nilus, Egyptian river god and the father of numerous daughters who mingled with the descendants of Inachus, forming a dynasty of kings in Egypt, Libya, Arabia and Ethiopia.
- Peneus, river god of Thessaly flowing from the foot of Pindus. He was the father of Daphne and Stilbe, love interests of the god Apollo.
- Scamander, who fought on the side of the Trojans during the Trojan War, and was offended when Achilles polluted his waters with a large number of Trojan corpses. In response, he overflowed his banks, nearly drowning Achilles.

Ancient Greek poet Hesiod mentioned several river gods by name, along with their origin story, in Theogonia ("the birth of the gods"):

And Tethys bare to Ocean eddying rivers, Nilus, and Alpheus, and deep-swirling Eridanus, Strymon, and Meander, and the fair stream of Ister, and Phasis, and Rhesus, and the silver eddies of Achelous, Nessus, and Rhodius, Haliacmon, and Heptaporus, Granicus, and Aesepus, and holy Simois, and Peneus, and Hermus, and Caicus fair stream, and great Sangarius, Ladon, Parthenius, Euenus, Ardescus, and divine Scamander. — Theogony, Hesiod. Translated by Hugh G. Evelyn-White (1914)

== List of river gods ==
The following are the sons of Oceanus and Tethys:

Name of river	River god	Sources							Location	Son of Oceanus and Tethys
Name of river	River god	Hes.	Ovid	Apol.	Plut.	Hyg.	Pau.	Others	Location	Son of Oceanus and Tethys
Achelous or Akheloios	✓	✓	✓	✓	✓	✓	✓	Homer, Sophocles, Euripides, Callimachus, Apollonius Rhodius, Diodorus Siculus, Statius, Hyginus, Plato, Aristotle	Aetolia	✓
Acheron	✓		✓	✓					Underworld and Thesprotia	*presumably
Acis	Changed into a river		✓						Sicily	son of Pan and nymph Symaethis
Acragas	?								Sicily	
Aeas	✓		✓						Epirus	*
Aegaeus	✓							Apollonius	Scheria (Corcyra)	*
Aesar	✓							Strabo	Tyrrhenia or Etruria	*
Aesepus	✓	✓							Troad	✓
Almo	✓		✓						Latium	*
Alpheus	✓	✓	✓		✓	✓	✓		Arcadia	✓
Amnisos	✓							Apollonius, Callimachus	Crete	*
Amphrysos	✓		✓						Thessaly	*
Anapus	✓		✓					Nonnus	Sicily	*
Anauros	?								Thessaly	
Anigros	✓							Strabo	Elis	*
Apidanus	✓		✓						Thessaly	*
Arar	River named after				✓				Gallia Celtica (Celtic Gaul)	
Araxes	River named after				✓				Armenia	son of Pylus
Ardescus	✓	✓							Thrace	✓
Arnos	✓							Strabo	Etruria	*
Ascanius	✓					✓		Antoninus	Mysia	*
Asopus	✓			✓			✓		Boeotia and Argos	✓; some accounts, son of Zeus and Eurynome or Poseidon and either Pero or Celusa
Asterion	✓						✓		Argos	*
Axenus or Axius	✓					✓			Paeonia and Macedonia	✓
Baphyras	?								Pieria	
Borysthenes	✓							Antoninus	Scythia	*
Brychon	✓							Lycophron	Chersonnese	*
Caanthus	✓						✓			✓
Caicinus	✓						✓		Bruttium	*
Caicus	✓	✓			✓				Teuthrania, Mysia	✓
Cayster	✓						✓		Lydia	*
Cebren	✓		✓	✓				Parthenius	Troad	*
Cephissus	✓		✓	✓		✓	✓		Phocis, Attica, Argos	✓
Chremetes	✓							Nonnus	Libya	*
Cladeus	?					✓			Elis	*
Clitumnus	?								Umbria	*
Cocytus	✓							Oppian	Underworld and Thesprotia	*
Cratais	✓					✓				*
Crinisus	✓					✓		Virgil, Lycophron, Servius, Aelian	Sicily	*
Cydnos	✓							Nonnus	Cilicia	*
Cytheros	?						✓		Elis	*
Elisson	?							Statius	Achaea	*
Enipeus	✓		✓	✓					Thessaly	*
Erasinus	✓						✓		Argos	*
Eridanus	✓	✓				✓			Attica	✓
Eridanus	✓	✓						Virgil, Nonnus	Hyperborea,	✓
Erymanthus	✓						✓	Aelian	Attica	*
Euphrates	✓				✓	✓			Assyria	✓
Eurotas	✓ River named after			✓	✓		✓		Laconia	son of Lelex and Cleocharia or of Myles
Evenus	✓	✓		✓	✓				Aetolia	✓ ; some accounts, a mortal son of Ares and either Demodice or Stratonice who flung himself to the river Lycormas
Lycormas	✓			✓	✓				Aetolia	✓ ; some accounts, a mortal son of Ares and either Demodice or Stratonice who flung himself to the river Lycormas
Ganges	✓		✓		✓				India	*
Granicus	✓	✓	✓						Troad	✓
Haliacmon	✓	✓							Macedonia	✓
Halys	✓							Apollonius, Valerius Flaccus	Paphlygonia and Pontos	*
Hebrus	✓				✓			Lucian	Ciconia, Thrace	*
Heptaporus	✓	✓							Troad	✓
Hermus	✓	✓							Lydia	*
Hydaspes	✓				✓			Nonnus	India	✓; son of Thaumas and Electra
Ilissos	✓							Plato	Attica	*
Imbrasos	✓							Athenaeus	Samos	*
Inachus	✓			✓	✓	✓	✓		Argos	✓
Indus	✓				✓	✓			India or Caria	✓
Inopos	✓							Callimachus	Delos	*
Ismenus	✓				✓	✓			Boeotia	✓
Istrus or Ister	✓	✓							Scythia	✓
Ladon	✓	✓		✓			✓		Arcadia	✓
Lamos	✓							Nonnus	Cilicia or Boeotia	✓
Marsyas	River named after				✓				Phrygia	a satyr; son of Hyagnis and either Olympus or Oeagrus
Maeander	✓	✓	✓		✓	✓	✓		Caria	✓
Meles	✓							Hellanicus, Eugaeon	Lydia	*
Mincius	✓							Virgil	Gallia, Italy	*
Nestos or Nessus	✓	✓							Bistonia, Thrace	✓
Nilus	✓	✓		✓	✓	✓			Egypt	✓
Numicius	✓		✓						Latium, Italy	*
Nymphaeus	?							Quintus Smyrnaeus	Bithynia and Paphlagonia	
Orontes	✓					✓			Syria	✓
Pactolus	✓				✓			Nonnus	Lydia	*
Parthenius	✓	✓							Paphlagonia	✓
Phasis	✓	✓			✓				Colchis	✓ (sometimes the son of Helios)
Phlegethon or Pyriphlegethon	✓							Virgil, Statius	Underworld	son of Cocytus
Phyllis	✓							Apollonius	Thynia, Anatolia	*
Peneus	✓	✓	✓				✓		Thessaly	✓
Pleistos	✓							Apollonius	Phocis	*
Porpax	✓							Aelian	Sicily	*
Rhesus	✓	✓							Rhesus (Ancient Greek: Ῥῆσος / Rhẽsos, Latin; Rhesus) was a river in Bithynia, Troad, Anatolia (modern-day Hisarlik, Çanakkale, Turkey). Per the Barrington Atlas, the Rhesus is likely Karaath Çay, a tributary of the Biga Çayı (known to antiquity as the Granicus). The Rhesus is alternately called the Rhedas, and was said to flow into the "Thracian Bosphorus at Chalcedon."	✓
Rhine	✓							Nonnus	Switzerland/Germany/France/Netherlands	*
Rhodius	✓	✓							Troad	✓
Rhyndacus	✓							Nonnus	Phrygia and Bithynia	*
Sangarius or Sagaris	✓	✓		✓	✓				Phrygia	✓
Satnioeis	?							Homer	Troad	
Scamander	✓	✓		✓	✓	✓			Troad	✓
Selemnus	✓						✓		Achaea	Originally a mortal man
Simoeis	✓	✓		✓		✓		✓	Troad	✓
Spercheus	✓			✓					Malis	
Strymon	✓	✓		✓	✓	✓			Edonia, Thrace	✓
Symaethus	✓		✓						Sicily	*
Tanais	✓				✓	✓			Scythia	✓
Telmessus	✓							Aelian	Sicily	*
Termessus	✓						✓		Boeotia	*
Thermodon	✓				✓	✓			Pontos and Assyria	✓
Tiberinus	✓							Virgil	Latium, Italy	*
Tigris	✓				✓	✓			Assyria	✓
Tyras	✓								Scythia	*
Titaressus	?							Homer, Strabo, Seneca	Thessaly	
TOTAL	89	26	18	17	26	22	18			40 (+50*)

== See also ==
- List of Oceanids
- Kawa-no-Kami, Suijin - the god of River in Japanese mythology.
- Hebo - the god of the Yellow River.
