= Ladon (river) =

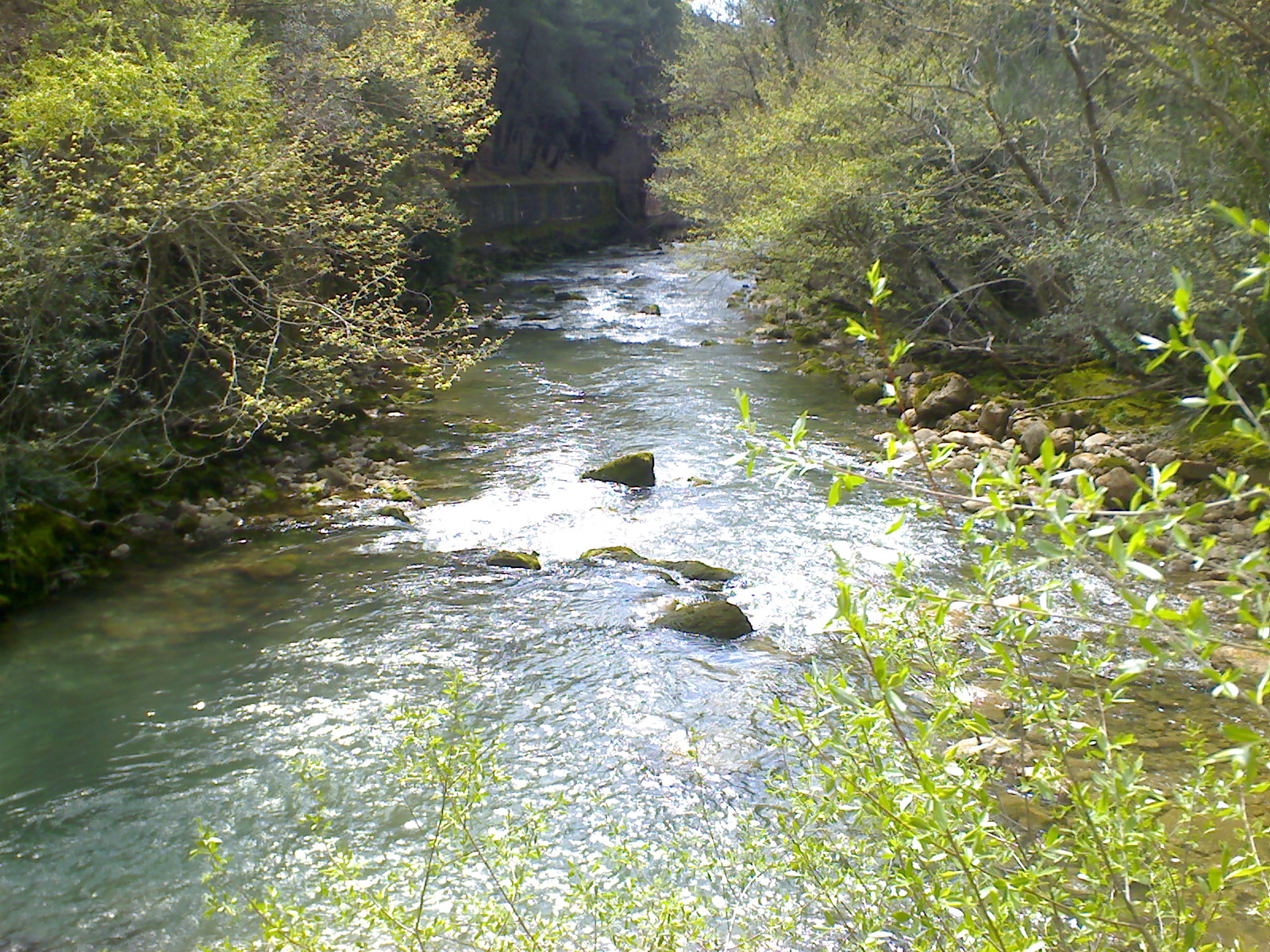

Location
- Country: Greece

Physical characteristics
- Source
  - location: Peloponnese
- Mouth
  - location: Alfeios
  - coordinates: 37°35′35″N 21°49′13″E
- Length: 70 km (43 mi)

Basin features
- Progression: Alfeios→ Ionian Sea

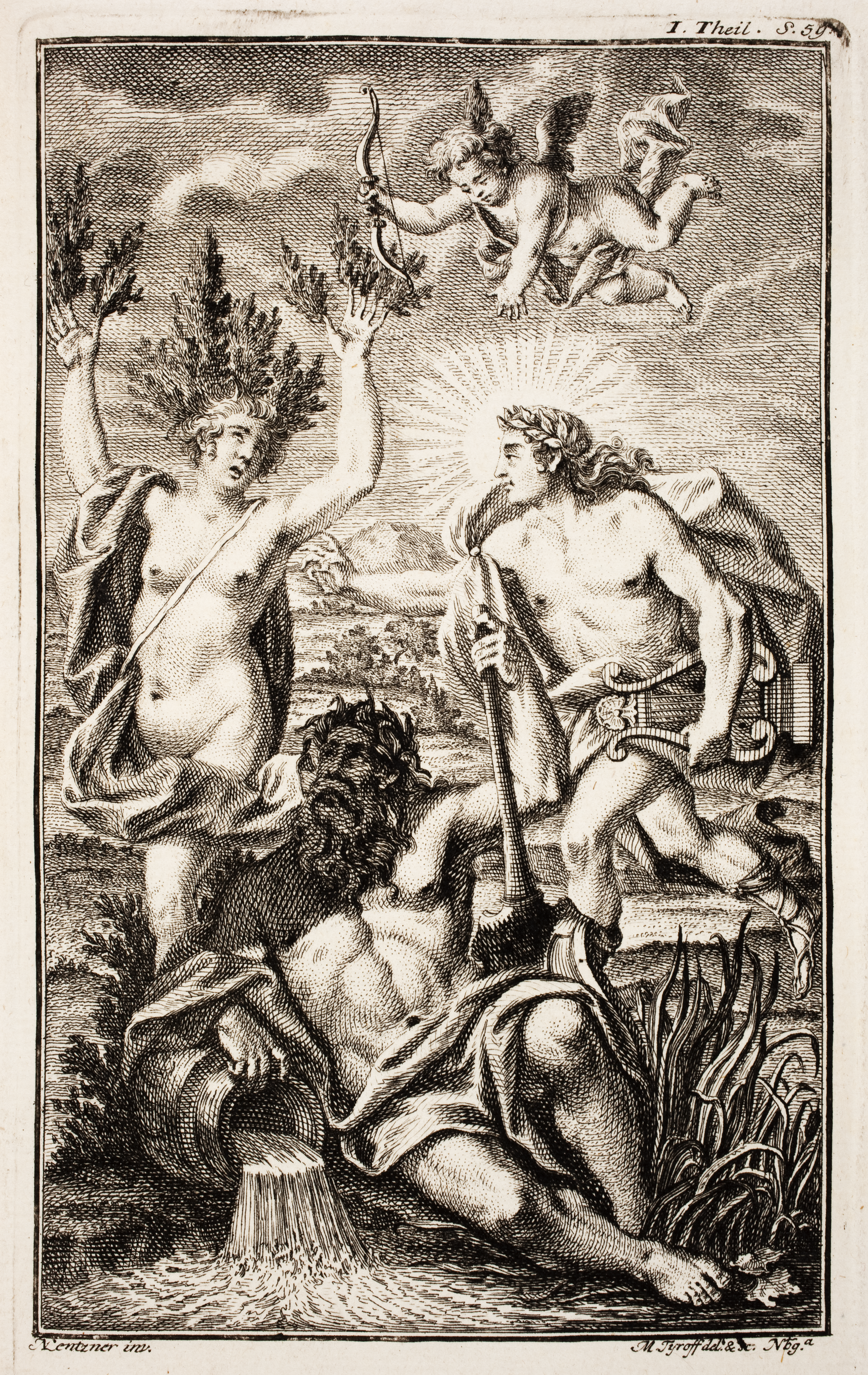
Martin Tyroff: Rivergod Ladon turns his daughter Daphne into a laurel bush. Martin Opitz, Daniel Wilhelm Triller: Teutsche Gedichte, 1746.

The Ladon (Ancient Greek and Katharevousa: Λάδων, Ládōn; Demotic Greek: Λάδωνας, Ládōnas) is a river in the Peloponnese peninsula of Greece. It features in Greek mythology. It is a tributary to the river Alfeios, which empties into the Ionian Sea. It is 70 km (43 mi) long.

== Course ==
The Ladon rises on the western slope of the Aroania mountain, near the village Kastriá, Kleitoria municipal unit, Achaea. It flows south, receives its left tributary Aroanios, flows along Kleitoria and turns southwest near the Arcadian border. It flows through the artificial Ladon Lake, and turns south again near Dimitra. It flows into the Alfeios 3 km southeast of the village Tripotamia. It joins the Tragus near Zevgolatio.

== Mythology ==
The river was among those mentioned by Hesiod in Theogony; they were "all sons of Oceanus and queenly Tethys" for, according to the image of world hydrography common to the ancients, the fresh water that welled up in springs came from the underworld caverns and pools, and was connected with the salt sea. Rain fertilized crops, but the sense that its runoff filled the rivers did not figure in the Greek mythic picture.

Rivers were personified and credited with wooing nymphs and human maidens and fathering children. By Stymphalis, Ladon became the father of the Arcadian nymph Metope who wed another river god, Asopus. The naiad Daphne, who rejected Apollo’s advances, was the daughter of Ladon and Ge (Earth). The river god’s other progeny were the naiads Telphusa and Syrinx

Rivers have cleansing effects in Greek mythology. When Poseidon assaulted Demeter, she washed away the insult in the waters of the River Ladon. Apparently this was the source of the Arcadian expression that to "giv[e] way to anger is to be furious."
