= Rhene punctatus =

Scientific classification
- Kingdom: Animalia
- Phylum: Arthropoda
- Subphylum: Chelicerata
- Class: Arachnida
- Order: Araneae
- Infraorder: Araneomorphae
- Family: Salticidae
- Genus: Rhene
- Species: R. punctatus

Binomial name
- Rhene punctatus Wesołowska & Haddad, 2013

Species of jumping spider

Rhene punctatus is a species of jumping spider that lives in South Africa. A beetle-like member of the genus Rhene, the spider that is typically 3.9 mm (0.15 in) long. Its forward section, its top, or carapace, and its bottom, or sternum, are dark brown. Its rear section, or abdomen, is pale brown on top, marked with a pattern of dark spots, and dark brown underneath. Its front legs are black and the remainder are orange. The male's copulatory organs are similar to the related Rhene lingularis but has a longer projection on its palpal tibia, known as a palpal apophysis, and a membranous projection next to its embolus. The male of the species was first described in 2013. The female has not been described.

== Etymology and taxonomy ==
Rhene punctatus is a species of jumping spider, a member of the family Salticidae. The spider was first described by arachnologists Wanda Wesołowska and Charles Haddad in 2013. They allocated it to the genus Rhene, which is named after the Greek female name shared by mythological figures. The specific name is a Latin word for "point" and refers to its dotted pattern.

First circumscribed in 1869 by Tamerlan Thorell, the genus Rhene is a part of the subtribe Dendryphantina in the tribe Dendryphantini. Wayne Maddison allocated the tribe to the subclade Simonida in the clade Saltafresia in the clade Salticoida. It is related to the genera Dendryphantes and Macaroeris. The genus is also similar to Homalattus. In 2017, Jerzy Prószyński designated it a member of a group of genera named Dendryphantines after the genus Dendryphantes. He also wrote that it is similar to the genera that are related to Simaetha, a group he named Simaethines, particularly in the shape of spider's body. The genus is known for its good eyesight and its high level of spatial awareness, which is likely to show that it is recent in evolutionary terms.

== Description ==
Like many in the genus, Rhene punctatus resembles a beetle. It is a very flat, stocky and hairy spider that is divided into two main parts: a cephalothorax and an abdomen. The male spider's cephalothorax has a typical length and width of 1.8 mm (0.07 in) Its dark brown carapace, the hard upper part of the cephalothorax, is very broad and flat. It densely covered in white hairs. Its eye field is large and trapezoid in shape. The first and second rows of the spider's eyes are very close to either its other. The underside of the cephalothorax, or sternum, is also dark brown. The area of the front of the spider called its clypeus is brown and very low. Its chelicerae have a single tooth and its mouthparts, including its labium and maxillae, are also dark brown.

The spider's very flat brown abdomen is typically 2.1 mm (0.08 in) long and 1.8 mm wide. Its front edge overlapping the spider's carapace, it has a pale brown top that is covered in dense white hairs. it has a distinctive pattern of numerous black dots scattered across the top and a large black patch towards the front. The underside of its abdomen is dark brown. The spider's spinnerets, used to spin webs, are darker. Its front pairs of legs are black and thicker than the others. The remainder are orange with black rings around some of the leg segments. It has dark pedipalps.

The male spider's copulatory organs include a very large convex palpal bulb. It consists of a bulbous tegulum that ends in a long broad flatted embolus and is accompanied by a membranous projection that follows its embolus. It is paired to a rounded cymbium that has an indentation that contains its embolus and a cavity at its root that contains the spike that projects from the spider's palpal tibia, called its palpal apophysis. Its palpal apophysis has a long hook at its end. Overall, its copulatory organs are similar to another African spider, Rhene lingularis, but has a longer tibial apophysis and its membranous apophysis next to its embolus. The female Rhene punctatus has not been described.

== Distribution ==
Although Dendryphantine spiders are predominantly found in the Americas, species of Rhene live in Africa and Eurasia. Rhene punctatus is endemic to South Africa. It has only been found in the Cathedral Peak Nature Reserve in KwaZulu-Natal.
