= Rhene curta =

Scientific classification
- Kingdom: Animalia
- Phylum: Arthropoda
- Subphylum: Chelicerata
- Class: Arachnida
- Order: Araneae
- Infraorder: Araneomorphae
- Family: Salticidae
- Genus: Rhene
- Species: R. curta

Binomial name
- Rhene curta Wesołowska & Tomasiewicz, 2008

Species of jumping spider

Rhene curta is a species of jumping spider that lives in Ethiopia. It has been found living near running water at an altitude of 1,600 m (5,200 ft) above sea level. A beetle-like member of the genus Rhene, the female was first described in 2008 while the male remains unknown. The spider is small, typically 4 mm (0.16 in) long and has very obvious vestigial indentations on its surface. Its carapace, the top of the front section of the spider, is brown, while its sternum, underneath, is brownish-grey. Its abdomen, the rear section of the spider, is greyish-brown on top, with a distinctive pattern of three faint yellowish stripes crossing the back. This pattern, as well as the hairs on its two front legs, help distinguish the spider from its relative, Rhene konradi. It is otherwise hard to distinguish from other members of the genus, although its copulatory organs are distinctive. The external visible part of the female's copulatory organs, its epigyne, is large and shows evidence of strong sclerotization, including the indentations that conceal its copulatory openings.

== Etymology and taxonomy ==
Rhene curta is a species of jumping spider, a member of the family Salticidae. The spider was first described by the arachnologists Wanda Wesołowska and Beata Tomasiewicz in 2008 and allocated to the genus Rhene. Rhene is named after the Greek female name shared by mythological figures. The specific name is the Latin word that can be translated 'trimmed'. The holotype is stored at the Royal Museum of Central Africa in Tervuren, Belgium.

First circumscribed in 1869 by Tamerlan Thorell, the genus Rhene is a part of the subtribe Dendryphantina in the tribe Dendryphantini. Wayne Maddison allocated the tribe to the subclade Simonida in the clade Saltafresia in the clade Salticoida. It is related to the genera Dendryphantes and Macaroeris. The genus is also similar to Homalattus. In 2017, Jerzy Prószyński designated it a member of a group of genera named Dendryphantines after the genus Dendryphantes. He also wrote that it is similar to the genera that are related to Simaetha, a group he named Simaethines, particularly in the shape of spider's body. The genus is known for its good eyesight and its high level of spatial awareness, which is likely to show that it is recent in evolutionary terms.

== Description ==
Like many in the genus, Rhene curta resembles a beetle. It is a small hairy flattened spider with a body is divided into two main parts: a cephalothorax and an abdomen. The female's carapace, the hard upper part of the cephalothorax, is typically 1.8 mm (0.071 in) in length, 1.9 mm (0.075 in) in width and 0.8 mm (0.031 in) in height. It is brown and covered in grey and brown bristles with a distinctive pattern of small punctures in the middle. At the front of the carapace is a large and trapezium-shaped eye field with long, thin bristles visible near the eyes themselves. The back of the carapace is plain. The underside of the cephalothorax, or sternum, is brownish-grey. The part of the spider's face known as its clypeus is very low and brown. Its mouthparts, including its labium and maxillae, are brown with lighter edges and its chelicerae are brownish with a single visible tooth.

The spider's abdomen is typically 2.2 mm (0.09 in) long and 1.8 mm (0.07 in) wide. Greyish-brown on top, with a pattern of three faint yellowish stripes crossing the back and an obvious circular indentation, or sigilla, it is covered with dense brown and greyish hairs, At the front, which overlaps with the carapace, there are a few thick brown bristles. The middle of the bottom is dark grey while the back is brownish and there is a pattern of light dots that form two lines that run from the front to the back. The spider's spinnerets, used to spin webs, are grey. Its front legs are short and dark brown with a thick spine visible on its tibia. The remaining legs are lighter, shorter and thinner with some darker segments and orange tarsi. They have thin brown leg hairs. The hairs on the front leg's tibia, as well as the pattern on its abdomen, distinguish the spider from the otherwise similar Rhene konradi.

The female's epigyne, the external visible part of its copulatory organs is large and shows evidence of strong sclerotization. It has two shallow depressions towards the front, a broad notch at the back, and copulatory openings that are hidden in sclerotized cavities, where accessory glands run into the seminal ducts. The spider's insemination ducts are long and thin, leading to bean-shaped spermathecae, or receptacles. Compared to the related Rhene konradi, the pocket in this spider's epigyne is wider. The male Rhene curta has not been described.

== Distribution and habitat ==
Although Dendryphantine spiders are predominantly found in the Americas, species of Rhene live in Africa and Eurasia. Rhene curta is endemic to Ethiopia. The holotype was discovered in 1986 near Hawassa, other specimen being found near Lake Langano. It lives near water, being found near a stream living in lush grass and in short grass under stones, at altitudes of between 1,600 and 1,900 m (5,200 and 6,200 ft) above sea level.
