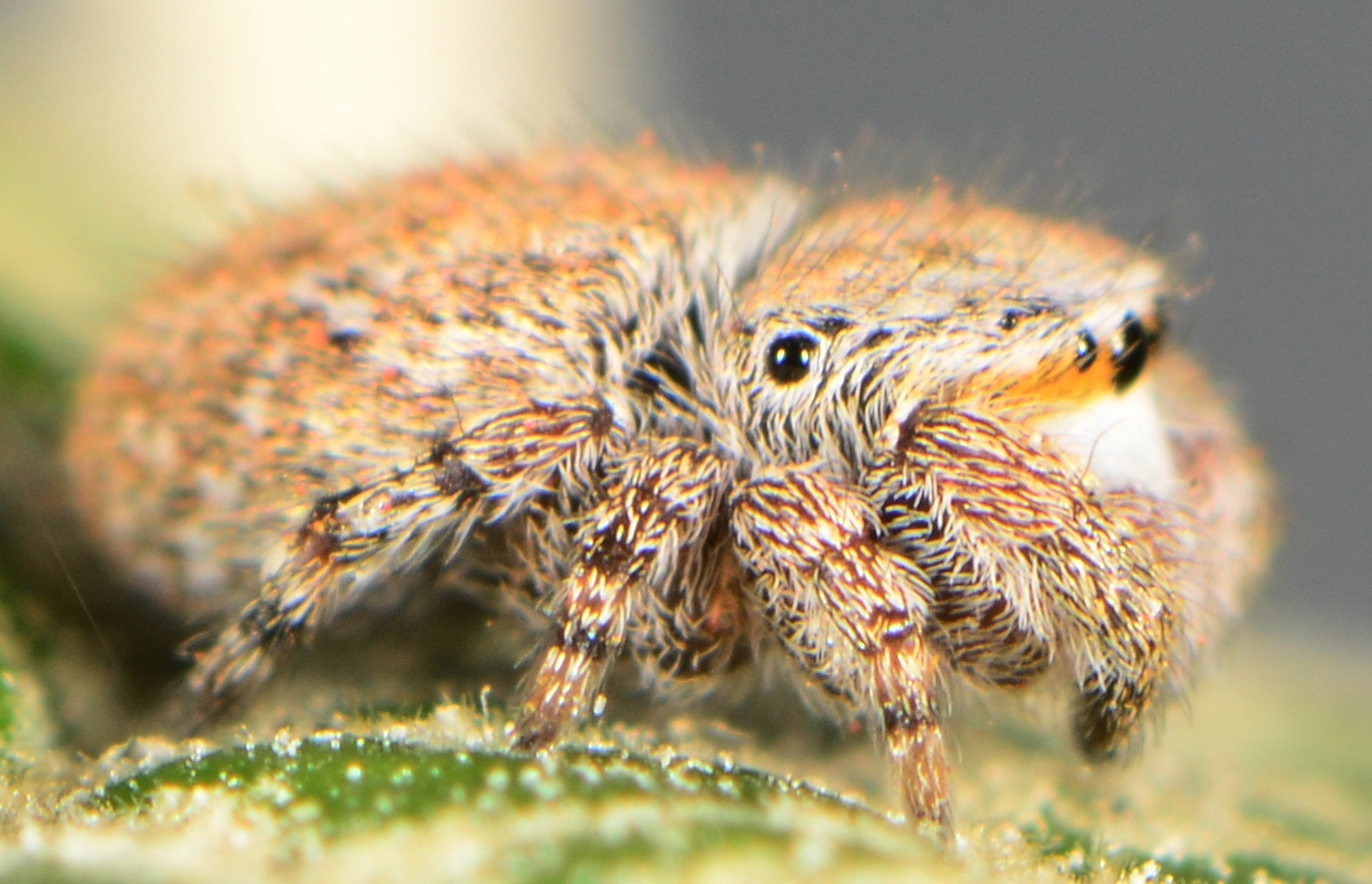
- A mature female Rhene konradi in South Africa
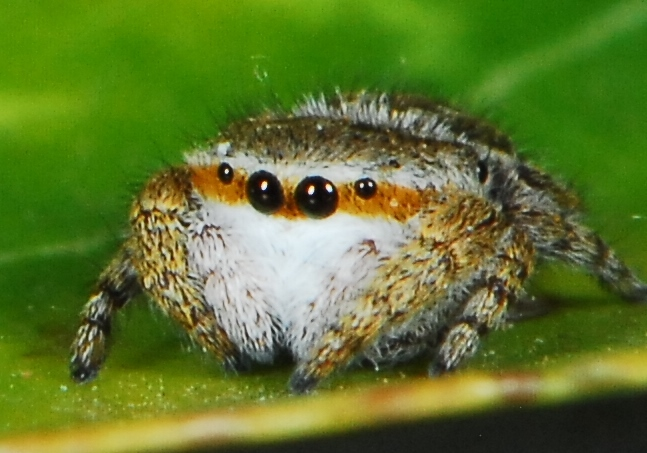
- A mature male Rhene konradi in South Africa

Scientific classification
- Kingdom: Animalia
- Phylum: Arthropoda
- Subphylum: Chelicerata
- Class: Arachnida
- Order: Araneae
- Infraorder: Araneomorphae
- Family: Salticidae
- Genus: Rhene
- Species: R. konradi

Binomial name
- Rhene konradi Wesołowska, 2009

= Rhene konradi =

Species of jumping spider

Rhene konradi, Konrad's Broad-headed Jumping Spider, is a species of jumping spider that lives in South Africa. Unusually for spiders in the genus Rhene, it has been found in grasslands as well as in wooded areas. It is a small spider that resembles a beetle, measuring between 3.2 and 5.3 mm (0.13 and 0.21 in) in total length. The male has a dark carapace, the hard upper part of its forward section, and brownish sternum underneath, its rear section, its abdomen, being brownish on top and greyish-beige underneath. The female is generally dark brown, although the underside of its abdomen is lighter. The male has a stripe on its carapace and the female has symbols on its abdomen. Otherwise, the spider is generally unmarked. Its first pair of legs are longer and thicker than the others. The female's epigyne, the visible part of its copulatory organs, has two depressions, which help distinguish the spider from the related Rhene formosa, and copulatory openings that are hidden in two entrance cavities. The male can also be identified by its copulatory organs, particularly its very small curved embolus. The spider was first described in 2009.

== Etymology and taxonomy ==
Rhene konradi is a species of jumping spider, a member of the family Salticidae, that was first described by the Polish arachnologist Wanda Wesołowska in 2009, one of over 500 different species that she identified in her career. She allocated it to the genus Rhene, which is named after the Greek female name shared by mythological figures. Its specific name recalls the Austrian arachnologist Konrad Thaler. The spider is known as Konrad's Broad-headed Jumping Spider. The holotype is stored in the National Collection of Arachnida at the Plant Protection Research Institute in Pretoria.

First circumscribed in 1869 by Tamerlan Thorell, the genus Rhene is a part of the subtribe Dendryphantina in the tribe Dendryphantini. Wayne Maddison allocated the tribe to the subclade Simonida in the clade Saltafresia in the clade Salticoida as part of his 2015 phylogenetic classification. It is related to the genera Dendryphantes and Macaroeris. The genus is also similar to Homalattus. In 2017, Jerzy Prószyński designated it a member of a group of genera named Dendryphantines after the genus Dendryphantes. He also noted that it is similar to the genera related to Simaetha, a group he named Simaethines, particularly in the shape of the spider's body.

== Description ==
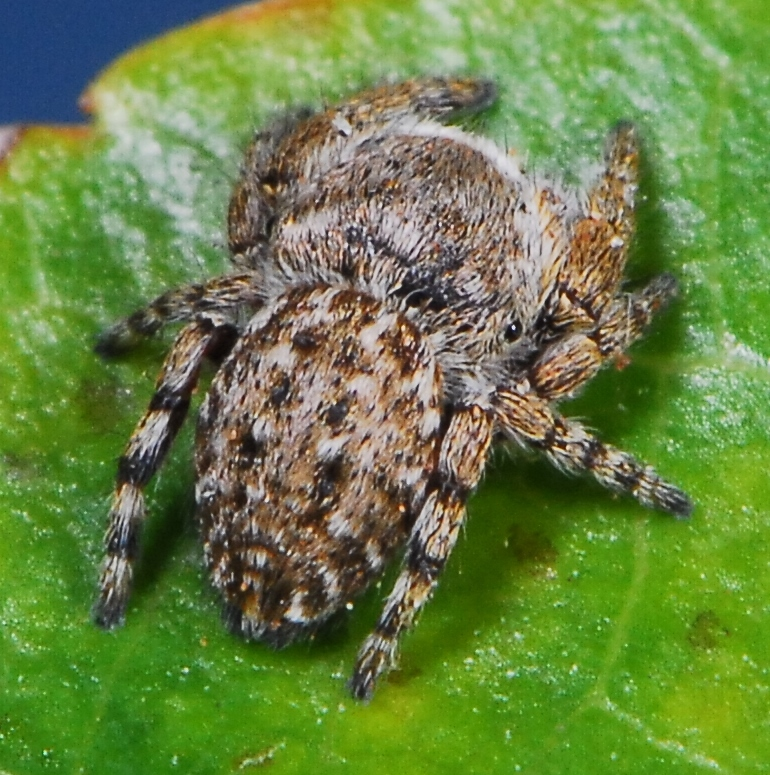
Male seen in Fouriesburg, South Africa

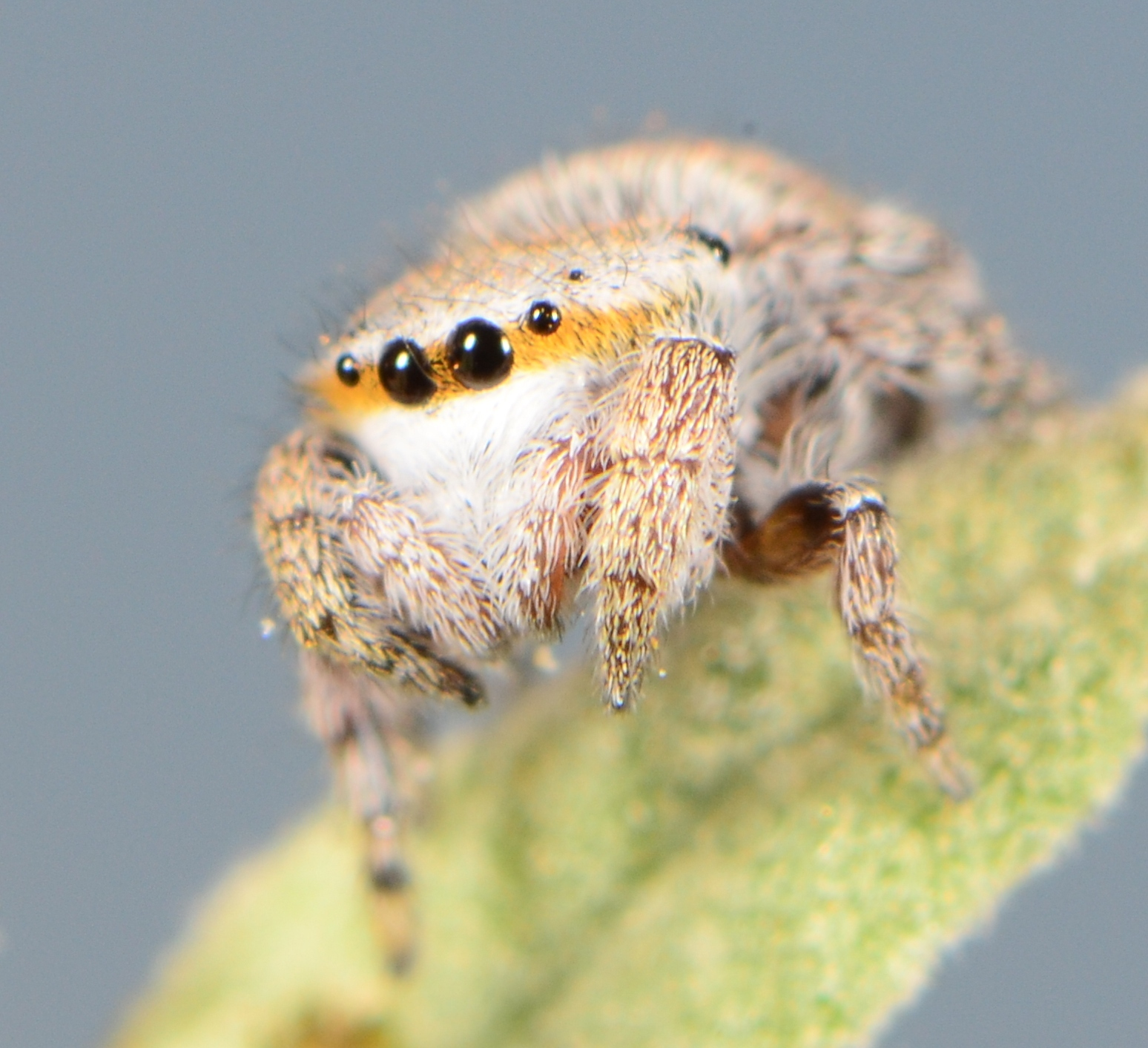
Female seen in Wynford Holiday Farm near Fouriesburg

Spiders of the genus Rhene resemble a beetle. Rhene konradi is small, flat and robust. The spider's body is divided into two main parts: a cephalothorax and an abdomen. The male's carapace, the hard upper part of the cephalothorax, is dark, nearly black, with a stripe running down the middle. It is typically 2.1 mm (0.08 in) long and 2 mm (0.08 in) wide. The spider's eye field is trapezoid and pitted, covered in dense colourless hairs. Its foremost eyes are surrounded with white scales with white hairs forming small patches in front of the other eyes. The underside of its carapace, known as its sternum, is brownish. Its dark brown chelicerae have long dense white hairs on their bases. Its remaining mouthparts, including its labium and maxillae, have a narrow line along its tips.

Lighter than its carapace, the male's abdomen is 2.8 mm (0.11 in) long and 1.9 mm (0.07 in) wide. It is brownish on its upper surface, with a coverage of dense colourless hairs, and greyish-beige underneath. Its spinnerets are brown. Its front pair of legs are dark brown, longer and stouter than the others, with long white hairs. The remaining legs are light brown. It has dark pedipalps. The spider has distinctive copulatory organs. Its pedipalps ends with a small palpal tibia that has a sharp curved spike, or tibial apophysis. It has a rounded cymbium that surrounds a bulgy palpal bulb. A very small curved embolus emanates from the top.

The female has a carapace length between 1.3 and 2.2 mm (0.05 and 0.09 in) and a width of between 1.6 and 2.4 mm (0.06 and 0.09 in). It is flattened, dark brown and covered in dense greyish hairs. Its sternum is dark brown. There are long thin bristles and grey hairs near its eyes. It has a very low clypeus and covered with light hairs. Its labium is dark brown and its maxillae are brown with light edges. There are light hairs on its chelicerae, which are similar to those found on its clypeus. Otherwise, its mouthparts are similar to the male.

The female's abdomen is between 1.9 and 3.1 mm (0.07 and 0.12 in) in length and between 1.7 and 2.7 mm (0.07 and 0.11 in) in width. It is dark brown with distinctive symbols on it. The underside is lighter than the topside. Some specimens have a covering of short white hairs, interspersed with a few brown bristles. Others are nearly hairless. Its book lung covers show strong evidence of sclerotization. Its spinnerets are brownish. As with the male, the first pair of legs are longer and thicker than the others. All its legs are relatively short.

The female's epigyne, the external visible part of its copulatory organs, is large with strong sclerotization. There is a broad pocket near the epigastric furrow and two small oval depressions near the front of the epigyne. Its copulatory openings are hidden in two entrance cavities. They lead to two long thin insemination ducts that lead to large spermathecae, or receptacles. The accessory glands are found near the start of the insemination ducts, in entrance cavities. Amongst its relatives that are found in Africa, its copulatory organs are most like Rhene cooperi, particularly in the presence of a deep ovoid cavity towards the front of its epigyne and of accessory glands near the beginnings of its copulatory ducts. It differs in the existence of finger-shaped depressions in the epigynal cavity and of a large notch along the back of its epigastric furrow. The epigyne differs from Rhene formosa in details, including having a two depressions rather than the single in the other species. It is similar to Rhene amabilis, although its accessory glands are larger.

== Distribution and habitat ==
Although Dendryphantine spiders are predominantly found in the Americas, Rhene spiders live in Africa and Eurasia. Rhene konradi is endemic to South Africa. It was first identified in the Amanzi Private Game Reserve near Brandfort in Free State. Unusually for the genus, it has been found in grasslands as well as in wooded areas.
