= Rhene eximia =

Scientific classification
- Kingdom: Animalia
- Phylum: Arthropoda
- Subphylum: Chelicerata
- Class: Arachnida
- Order: Araneae
- Infraorder: Araneomorphae
- Family: Salticidae
- Genus: Rhene
- Species: R. eximia

Binomial name
- Rhene eximia Wiśniewski & Wesołowska, 2024

Species of jumping spider

Rhene eximia is a species of jumping spider in the genus Rhene that lives in the forests of Uganda. A beetle-like spider, it has a forward section, or cephalothorax, that is between 2.3 and 2.5 mm (0.09 and 0.10 in) long and, behind that, an abdomen that is between 2.8 and 3.5 mm (0.11 and 0.14 in) long. Its carapace, the hard upper part of the cephalothorax has a characteristic shape, being oval rather than round or trapezoidal. The female is generally larger and has a pattern of a brown streak and light dots on the underside of its abdomen. The male has a pattern of two dark and two faint spots on a dark on the top of its abdomen. Both have legs that are generally yellow with brown sections, apart from the male's front pair, which are dark brown. The female's copulatory organs include a distinctive ridge that runs from its copulatory openings to the back of its epigyne, the external visible part of its copulatory organs. The male has a functional conductor near to its embolus at the top of its palpal bulb that makes it seem to have two emboluses. The embolus itself is twisted and ends in a hook. The species was first described in 2024.

== Etymology and taxonomy ==
Rhene eximia is a species of jumping spider, a member of the family Salticidae. The spider was first described by arachnologists Konrad Wiśniewski and Wanda Wesołowska in 2024. They allocated it to the genus Rhene, which is named after the Greek female name shared by mythological figures. The specific name is a Latin word that means 'unique' and refers to the unusual shape of the female's epigyne.

First circumscribed in 1869 by Tamerlan Thorell, the genus Rhene is a part of the subtribe Dendryphantina in the tribe Dendryphantini. Wayne Maddison allocated the tribe to the subclade Simonida in the clade Saltafresia in the clade Salticoida. It is related to the genera Dendryphantes and Macaroeris. The genus is also similar to Homalattus. In 2017, Jerzy Prószyński designated it a member of a group of genera named Dendryphantines after the genus Dendryphantes. He also noted that it is similar to the genera related to Simaetha, a group he named Simaethines, particularly in the shape of spider's body. The genus is known for its good eyesight and its high level of spatial awareness, which is likely to show that it is recent in evolutionary terms.

== Description ==
Like many in the genus, Rhene eximia resembles a beetle. The spider's body is divided into two main parts: a flattened oval cephalothorax and a flattened ovoid abdomen. The male's cephalothorax has a length of typically 2.5 mm (0.10 in) and a typical width of 1.9 mm (0.07 in). The spider's flattened carapace, the hard upper part of the cephalothorax, is generally dark brown apart from black areas near the spider's eyes and its slopes. There are short whitish hairs on much of the surface. Its eye field is relatively large, occupying a third of its carapace. and long bristles can be found around its eyes. The underside of its carapace, known as its sternum, is dark brown as are its mouthparts, including its labium and maxillae.

The male has an ovoid flattened abdomen that is typically 2.8 mm (0.11 in) long and 1.7 mm (0.07 in) wide. The top is dark yellow with a pattern that consists of two dark spots placed symmetrically with two more fainter spots closer to the front and a vague stripe in the middle towards the back.and yellow underneath. There are long whitish bristles to the front of the abdomen and two patches of white hairs towards the back. The bottom is yellow. Its front legs are thicker than the others and dark brown. They have mainly dark brown hairs with some white hairs on their femora. The second pair of legs are dark brown and the third and fourth pairs are yellow apart from their femora, which are brown.

The spider's copulatory organs include dark brown pedipalps that are covered in dense brown hairs. They end in a relatively small palpal tibia that has a small hooked projection, called a tibial apophysis. Attached to this is a smooth cymbium and a bulging palpal bulb. There is a meandering spermophore inside its relatively large tegulum, the main body of the palpal bulb, and, projecting from the top, a short hooked and twistedembolus, accompanied by a functional conductor that makes it seem to have two emboluses.

The female is generally larger than the male. It has a carapace that is between 2.3 and 2.5 mm (0.09 and 0.10 in) long and between 1.8 and 1.9 mm (0.07 and 0.07 in) wide. The female's abdomen is between 3.2 and 3.5 mm (0.13 and 0.14 in) long and between 1.7 and 1.9 mm (0.07 and 0.07 in) wide. The female's abdomen is greyish-brown on top with a light belt that has serrated edges across the middle. It has a single thin light band that stretches from the edge of the front of the abdomen along its sides. The underside has a large brown streak running down it and two series of light dots that make up two lines. Its legs are yellow with brown femora.

The female has an epigyne, the external visible part of its copulatory organs, that is unique. It has two long ridges, which show strong evidence of sclerotization, that run between its two copulatory openings and the back of the epigyne. The openings lead via straight ducts to spermathecae, or receptacles, that consist of a spherical first chamber and a curved second chamber. The second chamber has thick walls; both show sclerotization.

Rhene eximia is similar to other spiders in the genus, particularly Rhene kenyaensis and Rhene sulfurea. It can most easily distinguished by the shape of its carapace, which is oval with a short eye field while most species have a round or trapezoidal carapace that is dominated by a large eye field. The female's copulatory organs are also distinctive, particularly long ridges that run down its epigyne.The presence of the conductor next to the male's embolus is also distinctive.

== Distribution ==
Although Dendryphantine spiders a predominantly found in the Americas, members of the Rhene genus have only been discovered in Africa and Eurasia. Rhene eximia is endemic to Uganda. It has been found living near Entebbe.
