= Rhene kenyaensis =

Scientific classification
- Kingdom: Animalia
- Phylum: Arthropoda
- Subphylum: Chelicerata
- Class: Arachnida
- Order: Araneae
- Infraorder: Araneomorphae
- Family: Salticidae
- Genus: Rhene
- Species: R. kenyaensis

Binomial name
- Rhene kenyaensis Wesołowska & Dawidowicz, 2014

Species of jumping spider

Rhene kenyaensis is a species of jumping spider that lives in the hills near the Kenyan coast. A beetle-like member of the genus Rhene, the spider has a forward section, or cephalothorax, that is typically 1.6 mm (0.06 in) long and, behind that, an abdomen that is typically 1.6 mm (0.06 in) long. The top of its cephalothorax, its carapace is dark brown with a large eye field. The bottom of the cephalothorax, or sternum, is light brown. The top of the abdomen has a brown scutum and is marked with a pattern of white spots. Its legs are mainly light brown, apart from the dark brown front pair. Its copulatory organs are similar to other members of the genus, except for the shape of the male's embolus, which has a distinctive long twist. The species was first described in 2014.

== Etymology and taxonomy ==
Rhene kenyaensis is a species of jumping spider, a member of the family Salticidae. The spider was first described by arachnologists Wanda Wesołowska and Angelika Dawidowicz in 2014. They allocated it to the genus Rhene, which is named after the Greek female name shared by mythological figures. The specific name refers to the place where it is typically found.

First circumscribed in 1869 by Tamerlan Thorell, the genus Rhene is a part of the subtribe Dendryphantina in the tribe Dendryphantini. Wayne Maddison allocated the tribe to the subclade Simonida in the clade Saltafresia in the clade Salticoida. It is related to the genera Dendryphantes and Macaroeris. The genus is also similar to Homalattus. In 2017, Jerzy Prószyński designated it a member of a group of genera named Dendryphantines after the genus Dendryphantes. He also wrote that it is similar to the genera that are related to Simaetha, a group he named Simaethines, particularly in the shape of spider's body. The genus is known for its good eyesight and its high level of spatial awareness, which is likely to show that it is recent in evolutionary terms.

In 2021, Dmitri Logunov said that the species, alongside its relative Rhene biguttata, may be a member of the genus Rhenefictus. The generic name is a combination of the Latin word fictus, which means 'fales' with the genus name Rhene, alluding to the similarity between the genera. The difference lies in the structure of the male copulatory organs. The World Spider Catalog lists the species in the genus Rhene.

== Description ==
Like many in the genus, Rhene kenyaensis resembles a beetle. The spider's body is divided into two main parts: a cephalothorax and an abdomen. The male's cephalothorax has a length of typically 1.6 mm (0.06 in) and a typical width of 1.8 mm (0.07 in). The spider's dark brown carapace, the hard upper part of the cephalothorax, is broad, low and covered in white hairs. White hairs form an indistinct white band across the middle of the spider's thorax. Its eye field is large, pitted and trapezoid in shape. There are black rings around the spider's eyes. The underside of the cephalothorax, or sternum, is light brown. It has a very low clypeus that is covered in white hairs. Its chelicerae is small and has a single tooth. Of the spider's remaining mouthparts, its labium is darker brown while the maxillae are lighter.

The spider's abdomen is rounded, flattened and overlaps at the front with its carapace. Typically 1.8 mm long and 1,6 mm wide, it has a large brown hardened area, or scutum, which has a scattering of dark hairs on it, on its top and a brown underside. The top has a pattern of two lighter spots at the front, large patch towards the rear and two more vague spots at the back. There are stripes made of white hairs on the side of its abdomen. The spider's spinnerets are light brown, used to spin webs. Its front pair of legs are short, robust, dark brown, and covered in white hairs. The remaining legs are light brown with some sections marked with rings formed of light scales.

The spider has distinctive copulatory organs. Its pedipalps are dark. There are clusters of hairs off on the male's palpal tibia, which also has a hooked projection, called a tibial apophysis. A hairy cymbium dominates a lumpy tegulum, which has a relatively long twisting embolus projecting from the top. Rhene kenyaensis is similar to other spiders in the genus, particularly the related Rhene eximia and Rhene sulfurea that share its twisted embolus. However, its embolus is longer than the others. Other spiders, including Rhene plumata, have similar copulatory organs but their embolus are straight rather than twisted. The female Rhene kenyaensis has not been described.

== Distribution and habitat ==
Although Dendryphantine spiders are predominantly found in the Americas, species of Rhene live in Africa and Eurasia. Rhene kenyaensis is endemic to Kenya. The holotype was discovered living in Shimba Hills National Reserve in 1970. The hills lie near the coast and are low, not exceeding an altitude of 450 m (1,480 ft) above sea level.
