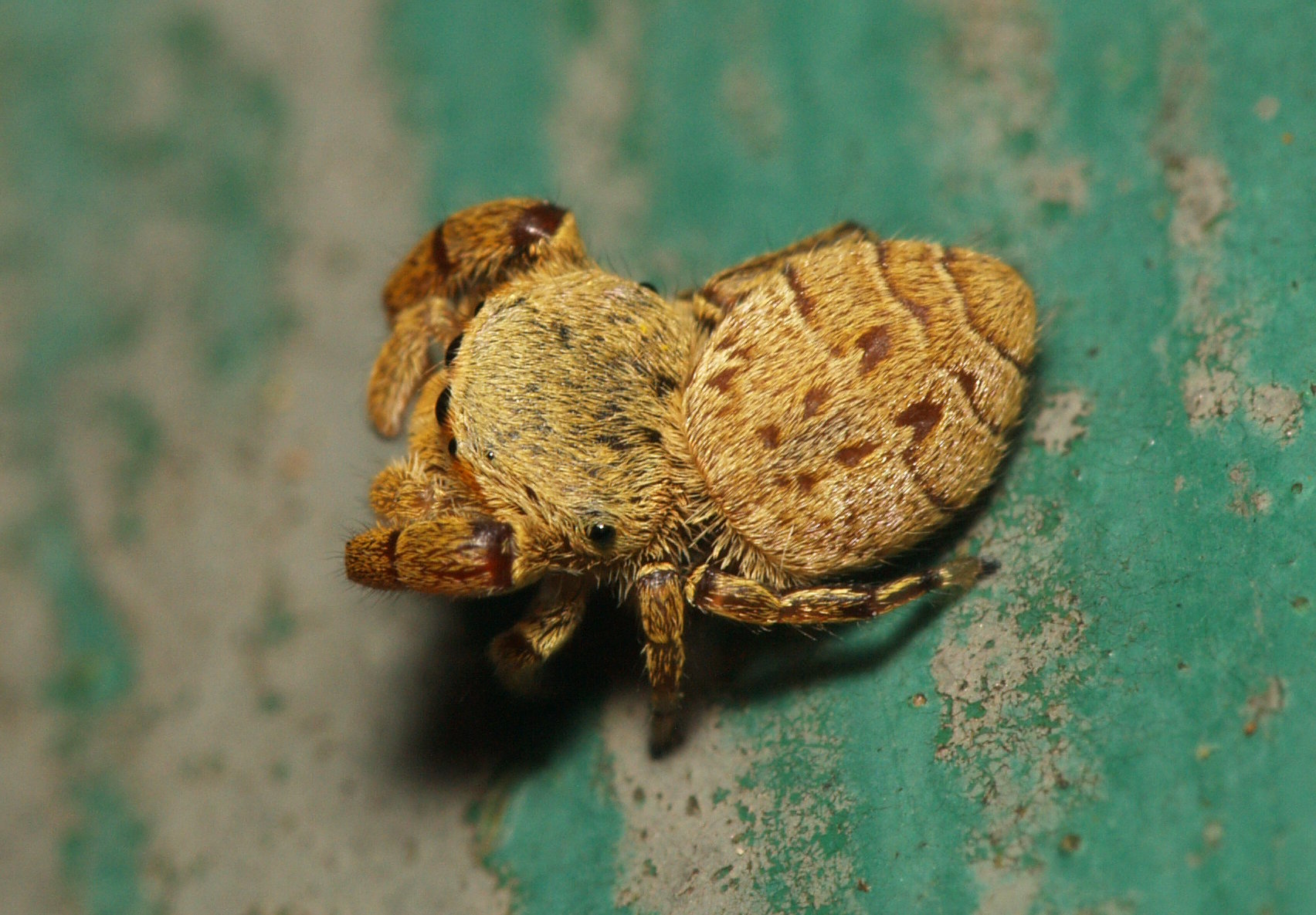
- Female Rhene flavigera from Hong Kong
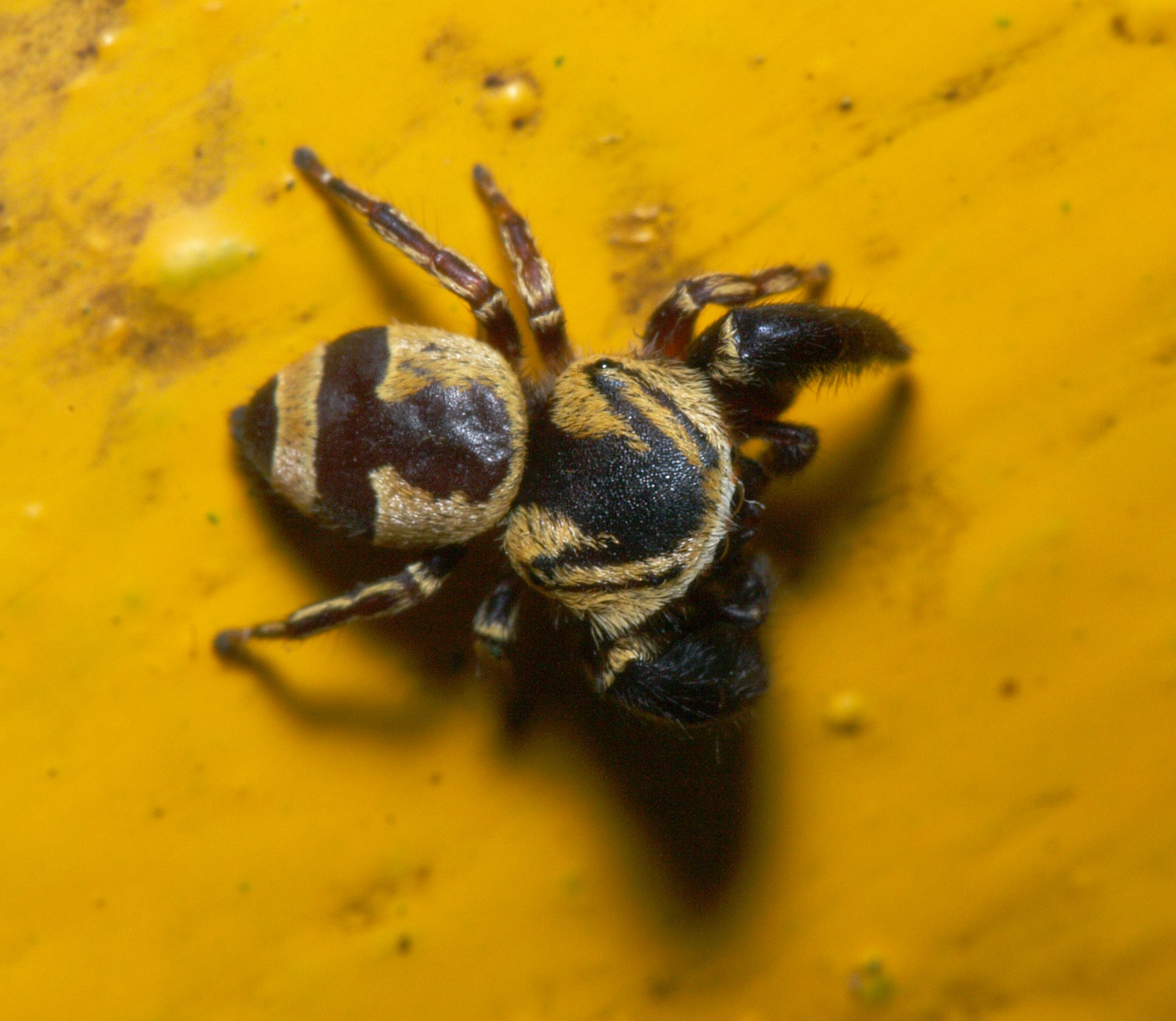
- Male Rhene flavicomans from Hong Kong

Scientific classification
- Kingdom: Animalia
- Phylum: Arthropoda
- Subphylum: Chelicerata
- Class: Arachnida
- Order: Araneae
- Infraorder: Araneomorphae
- Family: Salticidae
- Subfamily: Salticinae
- Genus: Rhene; Thorell, 1869

Type species
- Rhanis flavigera C. L. Koch, 1846

Species
- See text.

Diversity
- 69 species

= Rhene =

Genus of jumping spiders

Rhene is a spider genus of the family Salticidae (jumping spiders) whose species mostly live in tropical and subtropical regions worldwide.

== Taxonomy ==
The genus was originally named Rhanis by C. L. Koch in 1846. However, this name had already been used for a beetle genus in 1834. Accordingly, Tamerlan Thorell provided the replacement name Rhene in 1869. The name Rhene is derived from the Greek woman's name Rhene (Ῥήνη).

Rhene is a part of the subtribe Dendryphantina in the tribe Dendryphantini. Wayne Maddison allocated the tribe to the subclade Simonida in the clade Saltafresia in the clade Salticoida. It is related to the genera Dendryphantes and Macaroeris. The genus is also similar to Homalattus. In 2017, Jerzy Prószyński designated it a member of a group of genera named Dendryphantines after the genus Dendryphantes. He also noted that it is similar to the genera related to Simaetha, a group he named Simaethines, particularly in the shape of spider's body. The genus is known for its good eyesight and its high level of spatial awareness, which is likely to show that it is recent in evolutionary terms.

=== Species ===
Female R. albigera

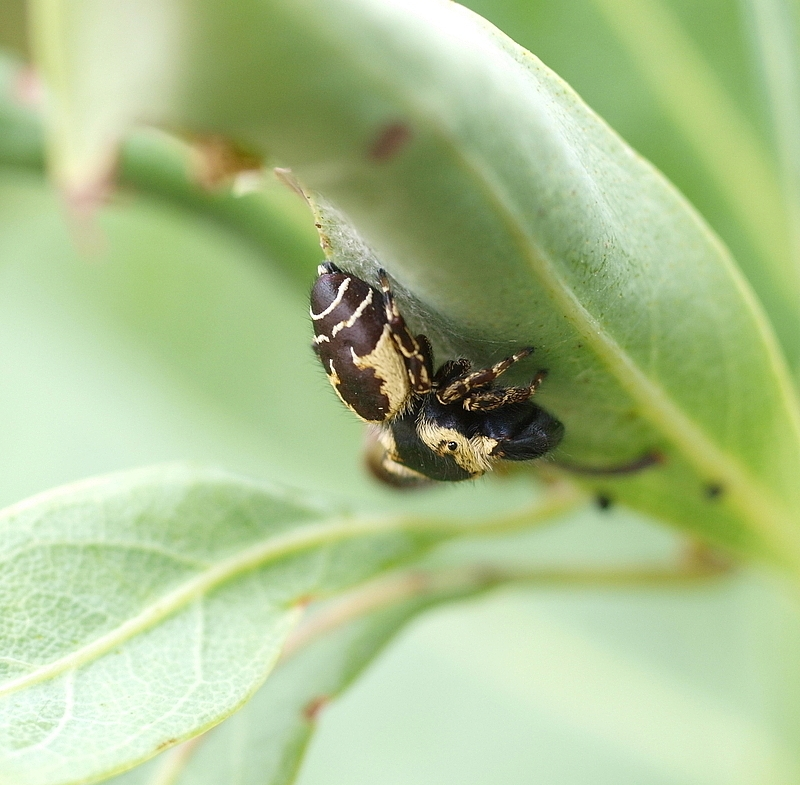
R. atrata from Japan

male R. nigrita

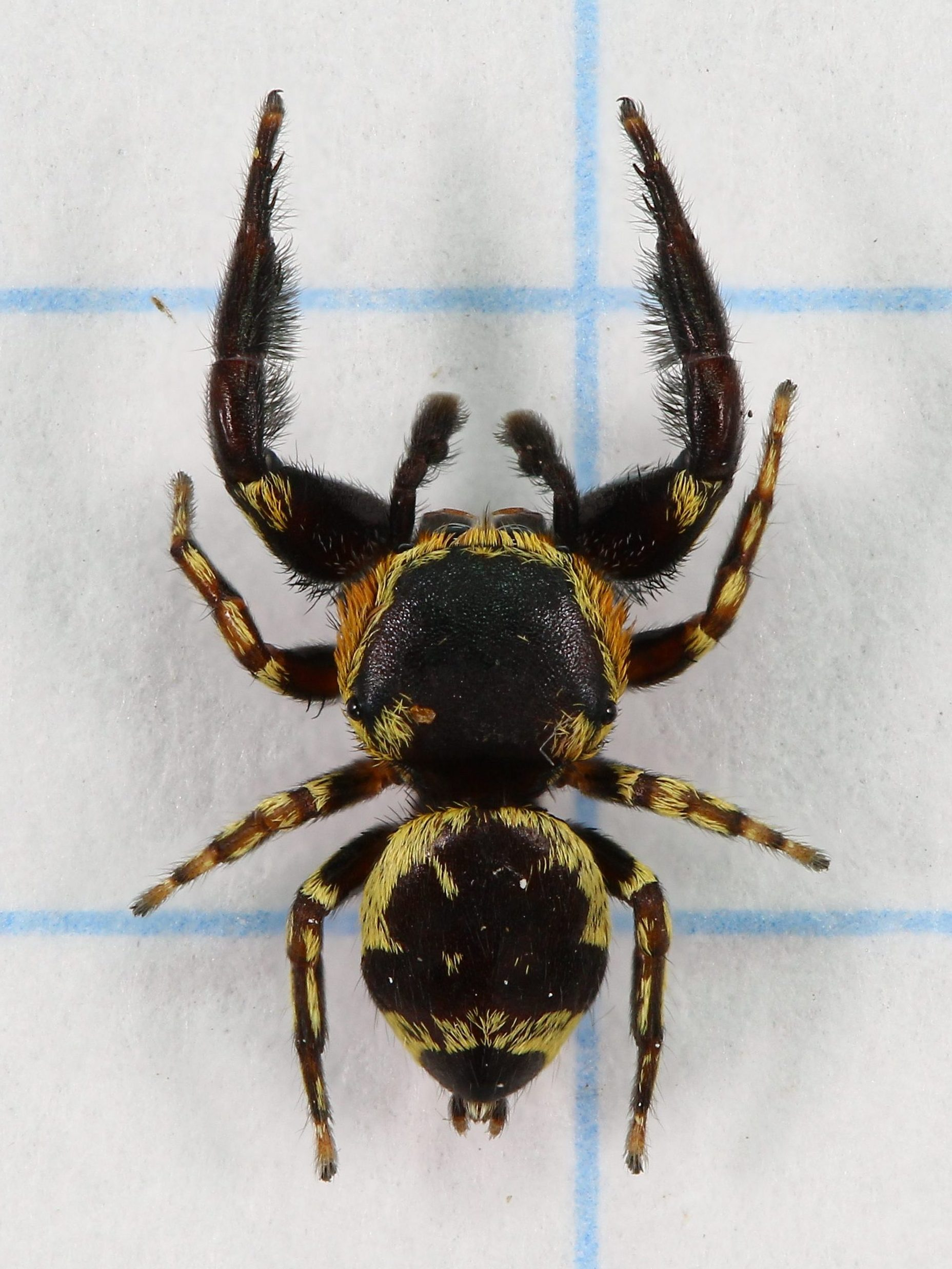
R. setipes from Japan

As of October 2025, this genus includes 69 species:

- Rhene albigera (C. L. Koch, 1846) – India to China, Japan, Vietnam, Indonesia (Sumatra)
- Rhene amabilis Wiśniewski & Wesołowska, 2024 – Uganda
- Rhene amanzi Wesołowska & Haddad, 2013 – South Africa
- Rhene atellana (Thorell, 1895) – Myanmar
- Rhene atrata (Karsch, 1881) – Russia (South Siberia, Far East), China, Korea, Taiwan, Japan
- Rhene banksi G. W. Peckham & E. G. Peckham, 1902 – South Africa
- Rhene biguttata G. W. Peckham & E. G. Peckham, 1903 – South Africa
- Rhene brevipes (Thorell, 1891) – Indonesia (Sumatra)
- Rhene bufo (Doleschall, 1859) – Myanmar to Indonesia (Sumatra)
- Rhene callida G. W. Peckham & E. G. Peckham, 1895 – India
- Rhene callosa (G. W. Peckham & E. G. Peckham, 1895) – India
- Rhene cancer Wesołowska & Cumming, 2008 – Zimbabwe
- Rhene candida Fox, 1937 – China
- Rhene capensis Strand, 1909 – South Africa
- Rhene cooperi Lessert, 1925 – South Africa
- Rhene curta Wesołowska & Tomasiewicz, 2008 – Ethiopia
- Rhene daitarensis Prószyński, 1992 – India
- Rhene darjeelingiana Prószyński, 1992 – India
- Rhene deplanata (Karsch, 1880) – Philippines
- Rhene digitata Peng & Li, 2008 – China
- Rhene elongata C. Wang, Mi & Peng, 2023 – China
- Rhene eximia Wiśniewski & Wesołowska, 2024 – Uganda
- Rhene facilis Wesołowska & Russell-Smith, 2000 – Tanzania, South Africa
- Rhene ferkensis Wesołowska & Russell-Smith, 2022 – Ivory Coast
- Rhene flavicomans Simon, 1902 – India, Sri Lanka, Nepal, Bhutan, China, Thailand, Vietnam
- Rhene flavigera (C. L. Koch, 1846) – Pakistan, India, China, Malaysia, Vietnam to Indonesia (Sumatra) (type species)
- Rhene foai Simon, 1902 – South Africa
- Rhene formosa Rollard & Wesołowska, 2002 – Guinea
- Rhene gbakore Wesołowska & Henrard, 2025 – Guinea
- Rhene habahumpa Barrion & Litsinger, 1995 – Philippines
- Rhene hexagon Wiśniewski & Wesołowska, 2024 – Uganda
- Rhene hinlalakea Barrion & Litsinger, 1995 – Philippines
- Rhene hirsuta (Thorell, 1877) – Indonesia (Sulawesi)
- Rhene histrio (Thorell, 1891) – India
- Rhene ipis Fox, 1937 – China
- Rhene jelskii (Taczanowski, 1871) – Peru, Guyana
- Rhene kenyaensis Wesołowska & Dawidowicz, 2014 – Kenya
- Rhene khulnaensis Biswas, 2023 – Bangladesh
- Rhene konradi Wesołowska, 2009 – South Africa
- Rhene legitima Wesołowska & Haddad, 2018 – South Africa
- Rhene lesserti Berland & Millot, 1941 – Senegal
- Rhene leucomelas (Thorell, 1891) – Philippines
- Rhene lingularis Haddad & Wesołowska, 2011 – Kenya, South Africa
- Rhene machadoi Berland & Millot, 1941 – Guinea
- Rhene margarops (Thorell, 1877) – Indonesia (Sulawesi)
- Rhene menglunensis Wang & Li, 2020 – China
- Rhene modesta Caporiacco, 1941 – Ethiopia
- Rhene mombasa Wesołowska & Dawidowicz, 2014 – Kenya
- Rhene mordax (Thorell, 1890) – Indonesia (Java)
- Rhene mus (Simon, 1889) – India
- Rhene myunghwani Kim, 1996 – Korea
- Rhene nigrita (C. L. Koch, 1846) – Indonesia
- Rhene obscura Wesołowska & van Harten, 2007 – Yemen
- Rhene pallida (Thorell, 1895) – India, Bangladesh, Myanmar, China, Vietnam
- Rhene parvula Caporiacco, 1939 – Ethiopia
- Rhene phuntsholingensis Jastrzebski, 1997 – Nepal, Bhutan
- Rhene pinguis Wesołowska & Haddad, 2009 – South Africa
- Rhene plana (Schenkel, 1936) – China, Korea
- Rhene plumata Haddad, Wiśniewski & Wesołowska, 2024 – Mozambique
- Rhene punctatus Wesołowska & Haddad, 2013 – South Africa
- Rhene rubrigera (Thorell, 1887) – India to Vietnam, China, Taiwan, Indonesia (Sumatra)
- Rhene saeva (Giebel, 1863) – Indonesia (Java)
- Rhene setipes Żabka, 1985 – China, Vietnam, Japan (Ryukyu Is.)
- Rhene sororis Wiśniewski & Wesołowska, 2024 – Uganda
- Rhene sulfurea (Simon, 1886) – Senegal
- Rhene tamula Karsch, 1879 – India, Sri Lanka
- Rhene timidus Wesołowska & Haddad, 2013 – South Africa
- Rhene triapophyses Peng, 1995 – China
- Rhene ugandensis Wiśniewski & Wesołowska, 2024 – Uganda
- Rhene yunnanensis (Peng & Xie, 1995) – China
