= Rhene mombasa =

Scientific classification
- Kingdom: Animalia
- Phylum: Arthropoda
- Subphylum: Chelicerata
- Class: Arachnida
- Order: Araneae
- Infraorder: Araneomorphae
- Family: Salticidae
- Genus: Rhene
- Species: R. mombasa

Binomial name
- Rhene mombasa Wesołowska & Dawidowicz, 2014

Species of jumping spider

Rhene mombasa is a species of jumping spider that lives in the area around Mombasa in Kenya. This is reflected in its specific name. The male has not been described.

== Etymology and taxonomy ==
Rhene mombasa is a species of jumping spider, a member of the family Salticidae. The spider was first described by the arachnologists Wanda Wesołowska and Angelika Dawidowicz in 2014. They allocated it to the genus Rhene, which is named after the Greek female name shared by mythological figures. The specific name refers to the place where it is typically found.

First circumscribed in 1869 by Tamerlan Thorell, the genus Rhene is a part of the subtribe Dendryphantina in the tribe Dendryphantini. Wayne Maddison allocated the tribe to the subclade Simonida in the clade Saltafresia in the clade Salticoida. It is related to the genera Dendryphantes and Macaroeris. The genus is also similar to Homalattus. In 2017, Jerzy Prószyński designated it a member of a group of genera named Dendryphantines after the genus Dendryphantes. He also wrote that it is similar to the genera that are related to Simaetha, a group he named Simaethines, particularly in the shape of spider's body. The genus is known for its good eyesight and its high level of spatial awareness, which is likely to show that it is recent in evolutionary terms.

== Description ==
Rhene spiders resemble a beetle. They are small to medium-sized with a flattened body.

Rhene mombasa has a cephalothorax that measures 1.5 to 1.6 mm (0.06 to 0.06 in) long and 1.7 to 1.8 mm (0.07 to 0.07 in) wide. Its dark brown carapace, the hard upper part of the cephalothorax, is broad and covered in white hairs interspersed with a few brown bristles. The eye field is large, pitted and trapezoid in shape, with black rings around the spider's eyes and a line of white hairs along the bottom of the front eyes. The underside, or sternum, is light brown. It has a dark, low clypeus with a few white hairs, and its chelicerae have a single visible tooth.

The spider's abdomen is light brown, rounded and flattened with an almost straight front edge. Measuring 2.2 to 2.4 mm (0.09 to 0.09 in) long and 1.9 to 2 mm (0.07 to 0.08 in) wide, it has an obvious circular indentation, or sigilla, and a pattern of indistinct patches on its top surface. The light brown spinnerets are used to spin webs.

The spider's legs are short, robust and brown, with the front pair being more robust than the rest. They have brown spines and light hairs. Its pedipalps, sensory organs at the front of the spider, are light brown and covered in white hairs.

The female's epigyne, the external visible part of its copulatory organs, shows evidence of strong sclerotization, including two hood-like shields that conceal the copulatory openings. These lead to initially wide insemination ducts that follow a simple curved path to relatively large spermathecae, or receptacles. Relatively substantial accessory glands are also visible internally. The presence of strongly sclerotized coverings protecting copulatory openings distinguishes the species from others in the genus.

The male Rhene mombasa has not been described.

== Distribution ==
Although Dendryphantine spiders are predominantly found in the Americas, species of Rhene live in Africa and Eurasia. Rhene mombasa is endemic to Kenya. It has only been found in the area of the country near Mombasa. The holotype was discovered in 1970 on Diani Beach; other examples have been seen near Bamburi.
