= Rhene formosa =

Scientific classification
- Kingdom: Animalia
- Phylum: Arthropoda
- Subphylum: Chelicerata
- Class: Arachnida
- Order: Araneae
- Infraorder: Araneomorphae
- Family: Salticidae
- Genus: Rhene
- Species: R. formosa

Binomial name
- Rhene formosa Rollard & Wesołowska, 2002

Species of jumping spider

Rhene formosa is a species of jumping spider in the genus Rhene that lives in the mountains of Guinea. The female was first described in 2002 while the male remains unknown. The spider is small, with a flat brown carapace that is typically 2.2 mm (0.087 in) long and an elongated beige abdomen typically 3.5 millimetres (0.14 in). It has brownish legs are brownish, the front legs longer, darker and thicker than the others. It is hard to distinguish from other members of the genus, although its copulatory organs are distinctive. It has a large, heavily sclerotized epigyne that has a depression in the middle that has no central ridge. Its insemination ducts are particularly long and thin and its spermathecae are smaller than those found in other spiders.

== Etymology and taxonomy ==
Rhene formosa is a species of jumping spider, a member of the family Salticidae. The spider was first described by the arachnologists Christine Rollard and Wanda Wesołowska in 2002. They allocated it to the genus Rhene, which is named after the Greek female name shared by mythological figures. The specific name "facilis" is derived from a Latin word that can be translated 'shapely' and recalls the body shape of the spider.

First circumscribed in 1869 by Tamerlan Thorell, the genus Rhene is a part of the subtribe Dendryphantina in the tribe Dendryphantini. Wayne Maddison allocated the tribe to the subclade Simonida in the clade Saltafresia in the clade Salticoida. It is related to the genera Dendryphantes and Macaroeris. The genus is also similar to Homalattus. In 2017, Jerzy Prószyński designated it a member of a group of genera named Dendryphantines after the genus Dendryphantes. He also noted that it is similar to the genera related to Simaetha, a group he named Simaethines, particularly in the shape of spider's body. The genus is known for its good eyesight and its high level of spatial awareness, which is likely to show that it is recent in evolutionary terms.

== Description ==
Like many in the genus, Rhene formosa resembles a beetle. It is a small spider with a body is divided into two main parts: a cephalothorax and an abdomen. The male's carapace, the hard upper part of the cephalothorax, is typically 2.2 mm (0.087 in) in length, 2.1 mm (0.083 in) in width and 0.9 mm (0.035 in) in height. It is flat, dark brown and hairy, mostly covered with brown and grey hairs, but with a line of white hairs behind the first row of eyes. Its face, known as the clypeus, is very dark and low. Its chelicerae are dark brown with a single tooth at the back and two at the front. The spider's remaining mouthparts, including its labium and maxillae are brown.

The female's elongated abdomen is longer than its carapace, measuring 3.5 mm (0.14 in) in length and 2.3 mm (0.091 in) in width. The top of its abdomen is light beige and a vague brownish pattern that can be seen near the back. As well as a silver lustre, it has a scattering of brown hairs on it; these are particularly dense and long on the front edge. The bottom is light brown. It has brown spinnerets. The spider's legs are brownish; its front legs are longer, darker and thicker than the others and are marked with long hairs.

Rhene formosa has distinctive copulatory organs. It has a large epigyne, the external visible part of its copulatory organs, that shows pronounced sclerotization. It has a shallow depression in the middle and copulatory openings that are hidden in sclerotized basket-like features. The spider's insemination ducts are particularly long and thin. Compared to the related Rhene sororis, which shares its long thin insemination ducts, it has more sclerotization. It has smaller spermathecae, or receptacles, than the related Rhene obscura and Rhene pinguis and lacks the ridge in the middle of the central depression that is characteristic of the former species. The male has not been described.

== Distribution and habitat ==
Although Dendryphantine spiders a predominantly found in the Americas, Rhene spiders live in Africa and Eurasia. Rhene formoa is endemic to Guinea. The holotype lives in the Guinea Highlands at an altitude of 1,550 m (5,090 ft) above sea level in 1991. Other examples have been found in the local area. It lives on the ground amongst plants.
