= Rhene amabilis =

Scientific classification
- Kingdom: Animalia
- Phylum: Arthropoda
- Subphylum: Chelicerata
- Class: Arachnida
- Order: Araneae
- Infraorder: Araneomorphae
- Family: Salticidae
- Genus: Rhene
- Species: R. amabilis

Binomial name
- Rhene amabilis Wiśniewski & Wesołowska, 2024

Species of jumping spider

Rhene amabilis is a species of jumping spider in the genus Rhene that lives in the forests of Uganda. The spider's specific name means 'attractive'. A beetle-like spider, it has a cephalothorax that is between 1.6 and 1.9 mm (0.06 and 0.07 in) long and an abdomen that is between 1.7 and 2.2 mm (0.07 and 0.09 in) long. It is generally brown, apart from its darker sternum, with a large pitted eye field and darker brown stripe on the top of its abdomen. Its spinnerets are yellowish-grey. Its front legs are black, the remainder mostly light brown. It has distinctive copulatory organs, particularly the male's wide forked embolus at the top of its palpal bulb and the female's accessory glands positioned with large chambers near the entrance of its insemination ducts. The species was first described in 2024.

== Etymology and taxonomy ==
Rhene amabilis is a species of jumping spider, a member of the family Salticidae. The spider was first described by arachnologists Konrad Wiśniewski and Wanda Wesołowska in 2024. They allocated it to the genus Rhene, which is named after the Greek female name shared by mythological figures. The specific name is a Latin word that can be translated 'attractive'.

First circumscribed in 1869 by Tamerlan Thorell, the genus Rhene is a part of the subtribe Dendryphantina in the tribe Dendryphantini. Wayne Maddison allocated the tribe to the subclade Simonida in the clade Saltafresia in the clade Salticoida. It is related to the genera Dendryphantes and Macaroeris. The genus is also similar to Homalattus. In 2017, Jerzy Prószyński designated it a member of a group of genera named Dendryphantines after the genus Dendryphantes. He also noted that it is similar to the genera related to Simaetha, a group he named Simaethines, particularly in the shape of spider's body. The genus is known for its good eyesight and its high level of spatial awareness, which is likely to show that it is recent in evolutionary terms.

== Description ==
Like many in the genus, Rhene amabilis resembles a beetle. The spider's body is divided into two main parts: a cephalothorax and an abdomen. The male's cephalothorax has a length between 1.6 and 1.8 mm (0.06 and 0.07 in) and width of between 1.8 and 1.9 mm (0.07 in). The female has a cephalothorax that is between 1.6 and 1.7 mm (0.07 in) in length and between 1.7 and 1.8 mm in width. The spider's carapace, the hard upper part of the cephalothorax, is round and very flat, with a pitted brown eye field taking up the majority of the top. There are two blackish spots on the eye field and black rings around the eyes themselves. The whole top surface is covered in dense white hairs, particularly above the first row of eyes. The underside of the cephalothorax, or sternum, is dark brown.

The part of the spider's face known as its clypeus is dark and very low. Its chelicerae have a single tooth. The spider's remaining mouthparts, including its labium and maxillae are dark brown. Its abdomen is a flattened briown oval. The female's abdomen is between 1.9 and 2.2 mm (0.09 in) long and between 1.7 and 1.8 mm wide. The male is smaller, between 1.7 and 1.8 mm long and between 1.6 and 1.7 mm wide. Its top has a pattern of a darker wide band that extends from the front halfway to the back and a blackish rear edge. The top is also covered in whitish hairs. The bottom is plain. Its spinnerets are yellowish-grey. The spider's legs are mainly light brown with dark brown patches and have whitish leg hairs. Its front legs are different; they are longer and thicker than the others and black with white hairs.

Rhene amabilis has distinctive copulatory organs. Its pedipalps are brown and the male's palpal tibia has a hooked projection, called a tibial apophysis. Its cymbium is a smooth and similar in size to its irregularly-shaped palpal bulb. There is a meandering spermophore inside its tegulum, the main body of the palpal bulb, and, projecting from the top, a wide embolus that has a forked end. The shape of the embolus helps distinguish the pider from other members of the Rhene genus, particularly the way that it wider at its base and has two tips.

The female spider has a rounded epigyne with two copulatory openings near the front that are widely spaces and that show strong evidence of sclerotization. The inlet part of the insemination ducts form large chambers with the accessory glands. The ducts then lead to semicircular spermathecae, or receptacles. Internally, it resembles the related Rhene konradi but differs in having smaller accessory glands, but they are still larger than many others in the genus and their position near the entrance to the insemination ducts is characteristic of the species.

== Distribution and habitat ==
Although Dendryphantine spiders are predominantly found in the Americas, Rhene spiders live in Africa and Eurasia. Rhene amabilis is endemic to Uganda. It lives amongst the trees of the Budongo Forest.
