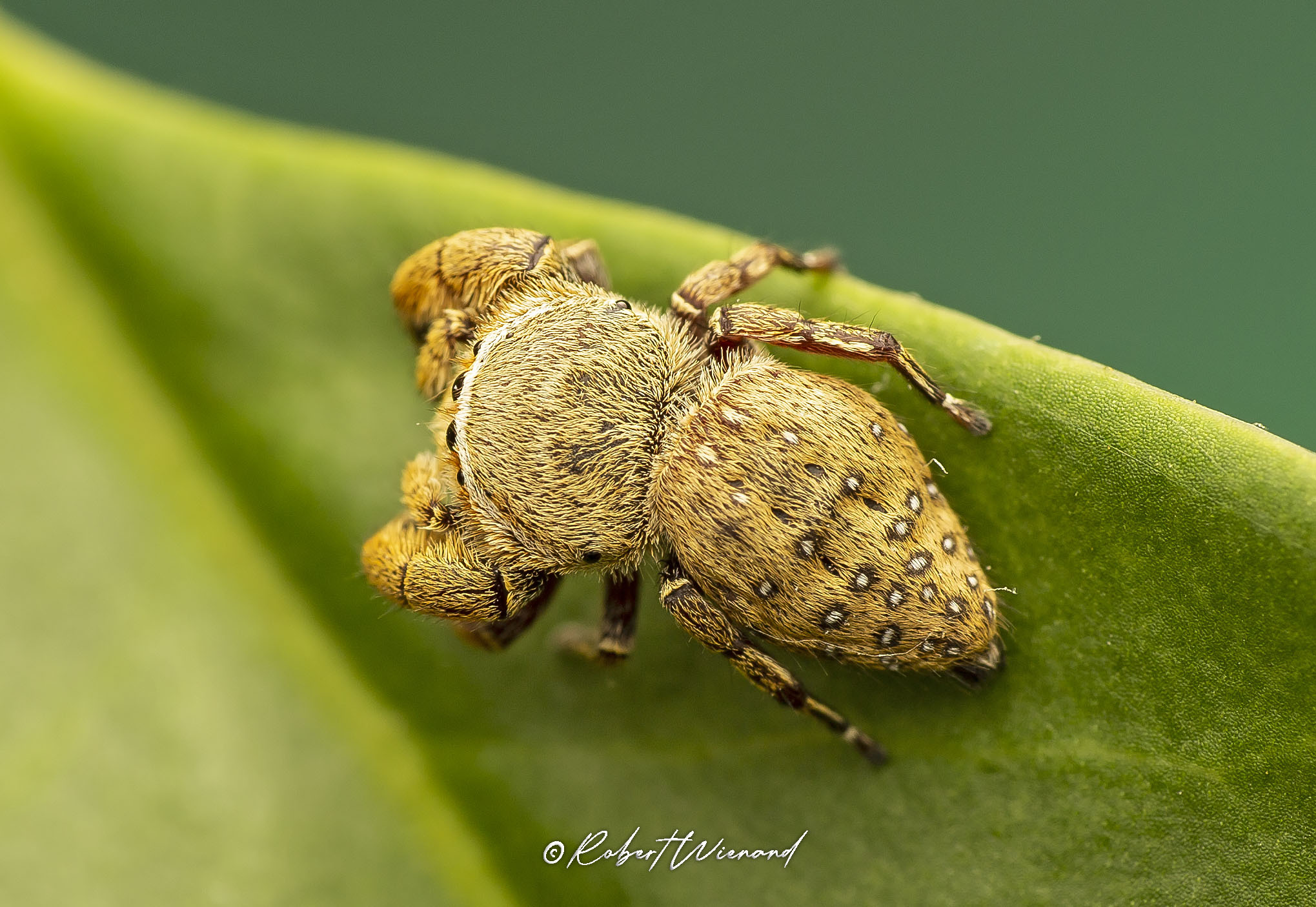
- female
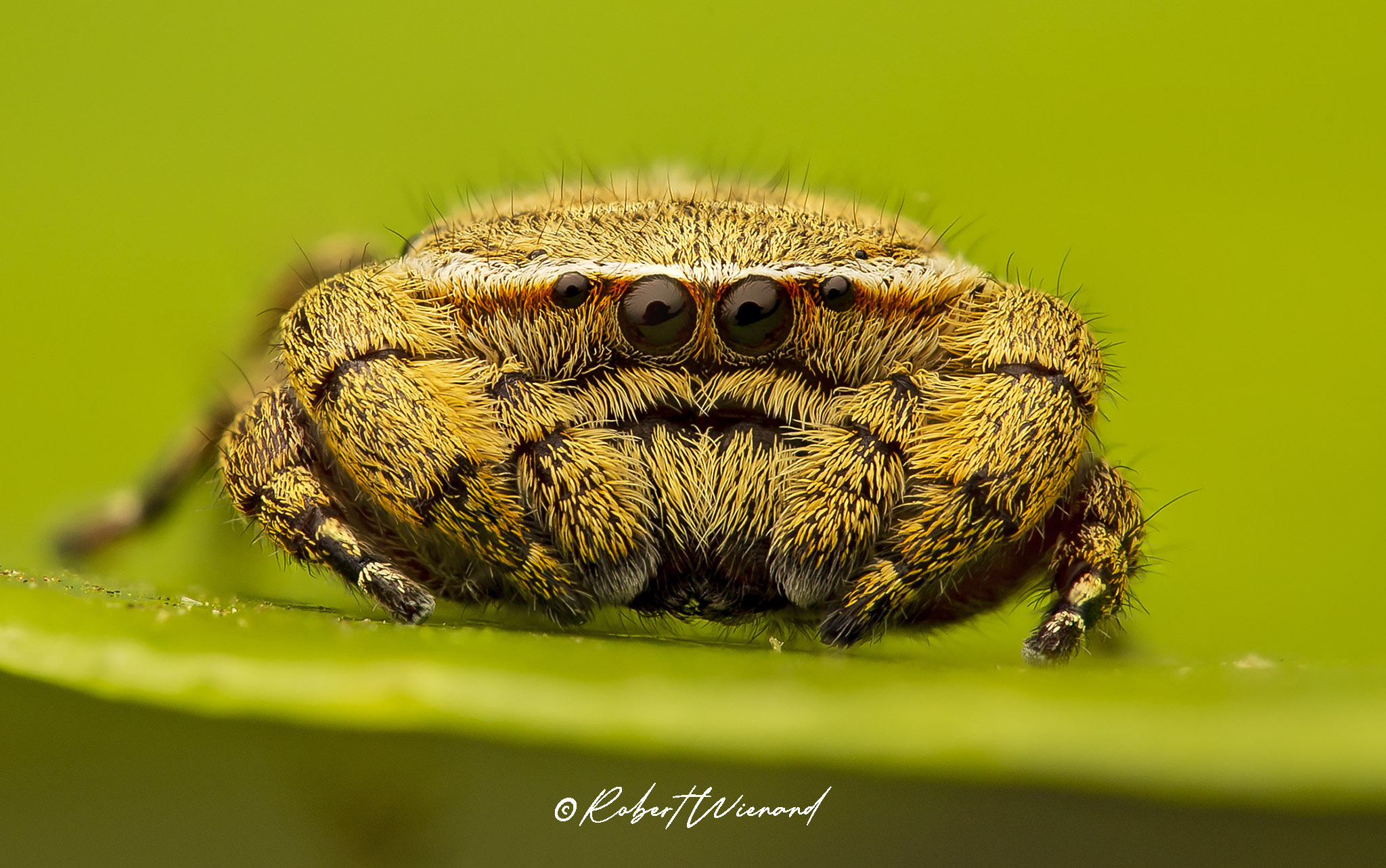
- female

Scientific classification
- Kingdom: Animalia
- Phylum: Arthropoda
- Subphylum: Chelicerata
- Class: Arachnida
- Order: Araneae
- Infraorder: Araneomorphae
- Family: Salticidae
- Genus: Homalattus
- Species: H. punctatus

Binomial name
- Homalattus punctatus Peckham & Peckham, 1903

= Homalattus punctatus =

Spotted Homalattus Jumping Spider

Species of spider

Homalattus punctatus is a species of jumping spider in the family Salticidae. It is endemic to South Africa and is commonly known as the spotted Homalattus jumping spider.

== Distribution ==
Homalattus punctatus has only been sampled from Durban, Kloof, and Umhlanga Rocks in the South African KwaZulu-Natal Province.

== Habitat and ecology ==
This species is a free-living plant-dweller sampled from the Savanna and Indian Ocean Coastal Belt biomes at altitudes ranging from 17 to 496 m.

== Conservation ==
Homalattus punctatus is listed as Data Deficient by the South African National Biodiversity Institute. This species is undersampled and more sampling is needed to complete an assessment. Additional sampling is needed to collect the male and determine the species' range.

== Taxonomy ==
Homalattus punctatus was described by George and Elizabeth Peckham in 1903 from Durban.
