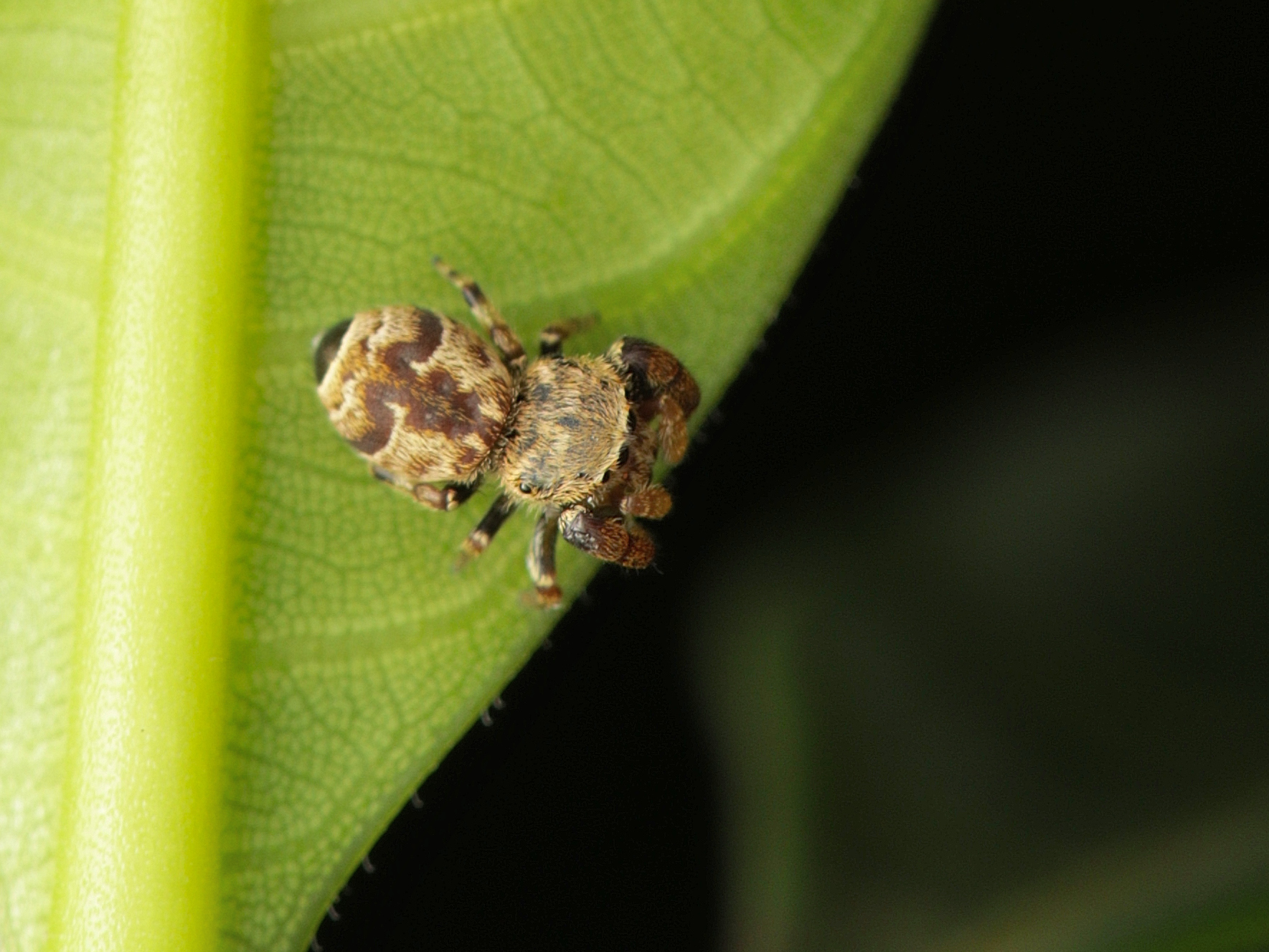
- female from India
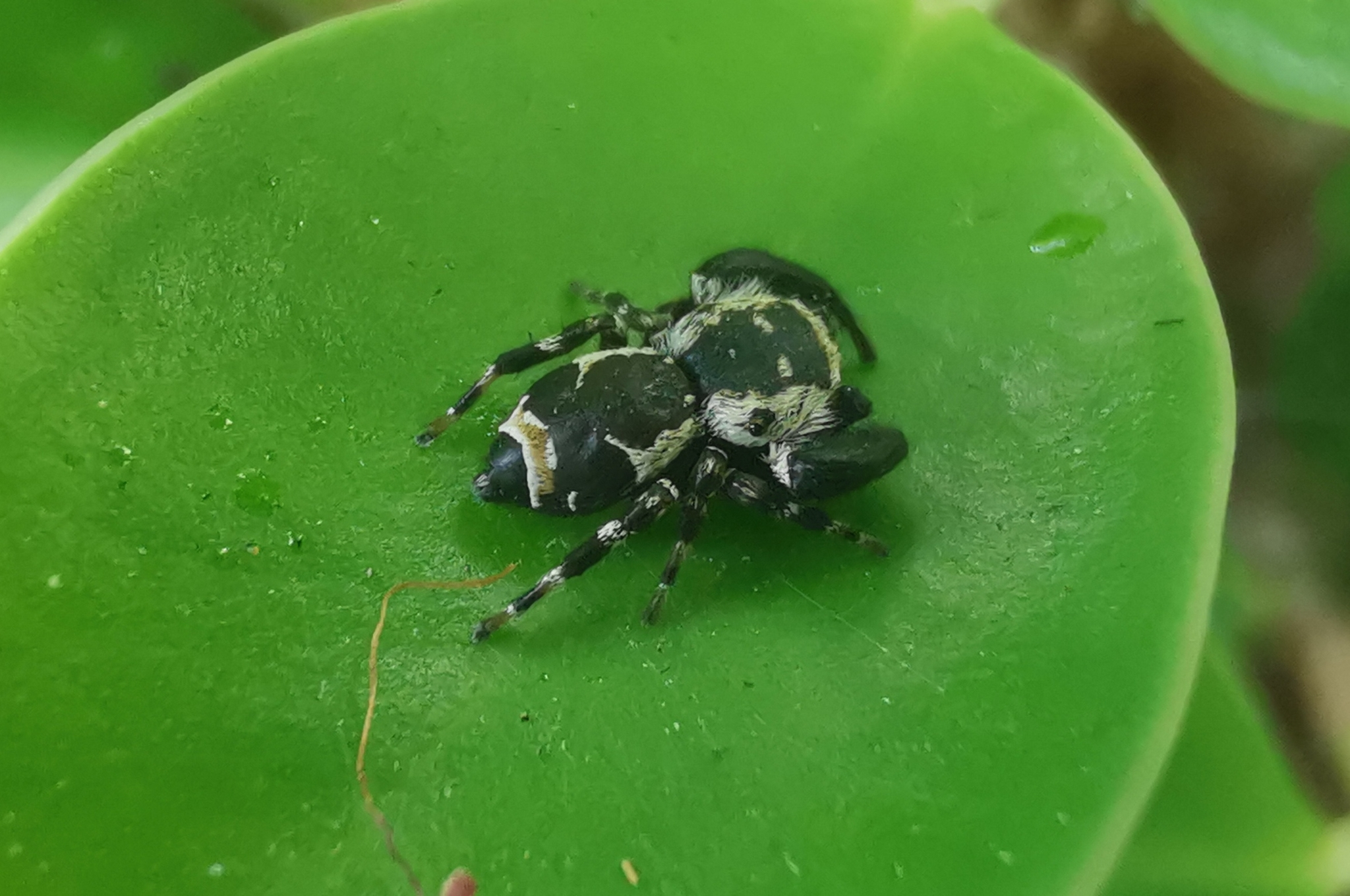
- male from Thailand

Scientific classification
- Kingdom: Animalia
- Phylum: Arthropoda
- Subphylum: Chelicerata
- Class: Arachnida
- Order: Araneae
- Infraorder: Araneomorphae
- Family: Salticidae
- Genus: Rhene
- Species: R. flavigera

Binomial name
- Rhene flavigera (C. L. Koch, 1846)

Synonyms
- Rhanis flavigera C. L. Koch, 1846; Rhene danieli Tikader, 1973; Rhene indica Tikader, 1973; Rhene khandalaensis Tikader, 1977; Zygoballus citri Sadana, 1991; Rhene citri (Sadana, 1991); Rhene sanghrakshiti Gajbe, 2004

= Rhene flavigera =

Beige beetle jumper

Species of spider

Rhene flavigera, commonly known as the beige beetle jumper or Zorro flat-head jumper, is a species of jumping spider in the genus Rhene. It is widely distributed across Asia, from Pakistan to Indonesia and Taiwan.

== Taxonomy ==
The species was originally described as Rhanis flavigera by Carl Ludwig Koch in 1846. The genus name Rhanis was later found to be preoccupied by a beetle genus described in 1834, so Tamerlan Thorell provided the replacement name Rhene in 1869. Rhene flavigera serves as the type species for the genus Rhene.

In 2022, Caleb and colleagues conducted a comprehensive taxonomic revision that resulted in five species being synonymized with R. flavigera: Rhene citri, R. danieli, R. indica, R. khandalaensis, and R. sanghrakshiti. This taxonomic consolidation was based on detailed morphological analysis of specimens from across South and Southeast Asia.

== Distribution ==
R. flavigera has a broad distribution across Asia. The species has been recorded from Pakistan, India, China, Malaysia, Vietnam, and Indonesia (including Sumatra). It is particularly well-documented from the Indian subcontinent, where several of its former synonyms were originally described.

== Habitat ==
R. flavigera is found in various habitats including gardens, agricultural areas, and forests. The species has been observed in tea plantations in the Dooars region of West Bengal, India. It constructs silk retreats by joining leaves together and emerges to forage for prey.

== Description ==
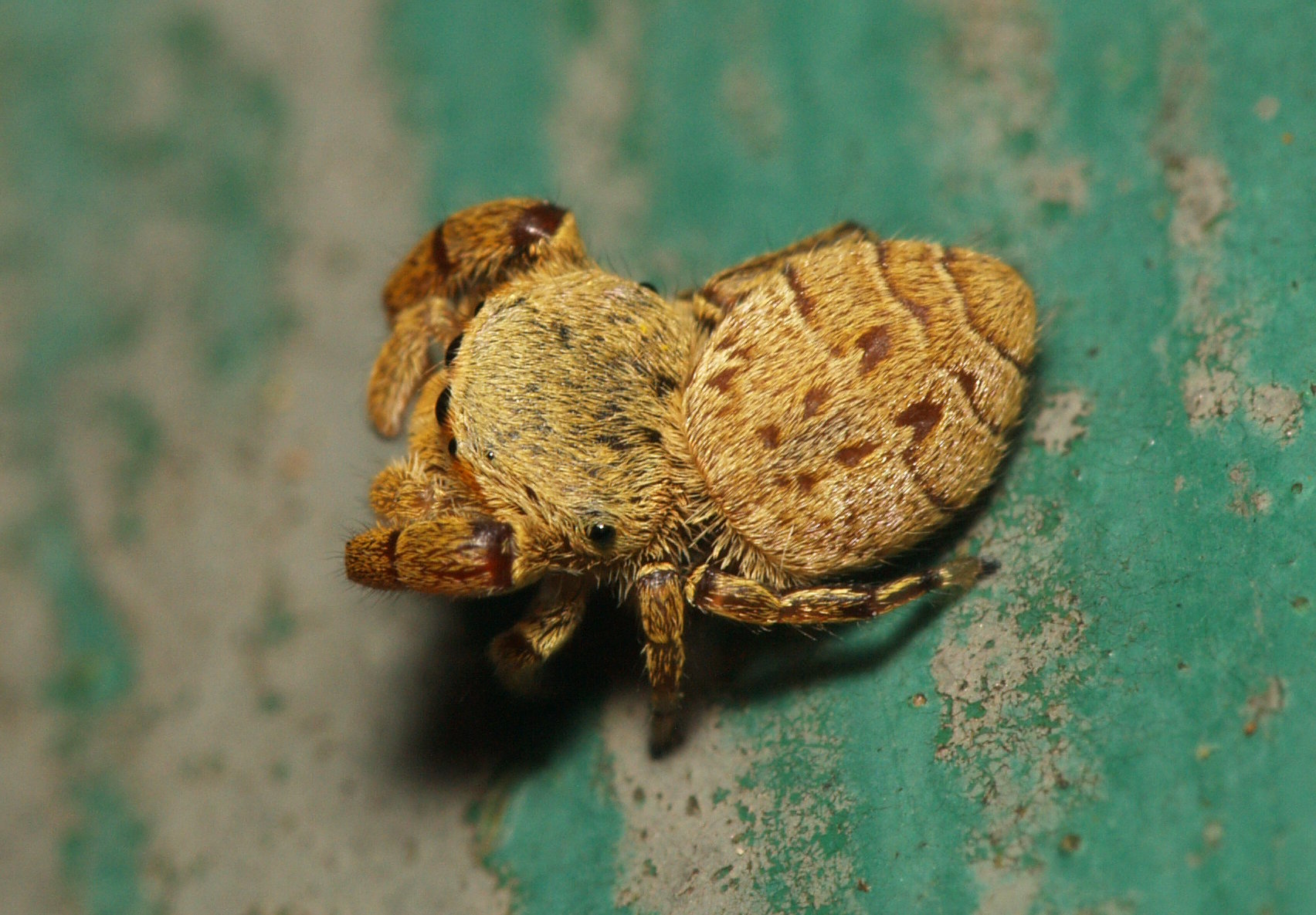
Female from Hong Kong

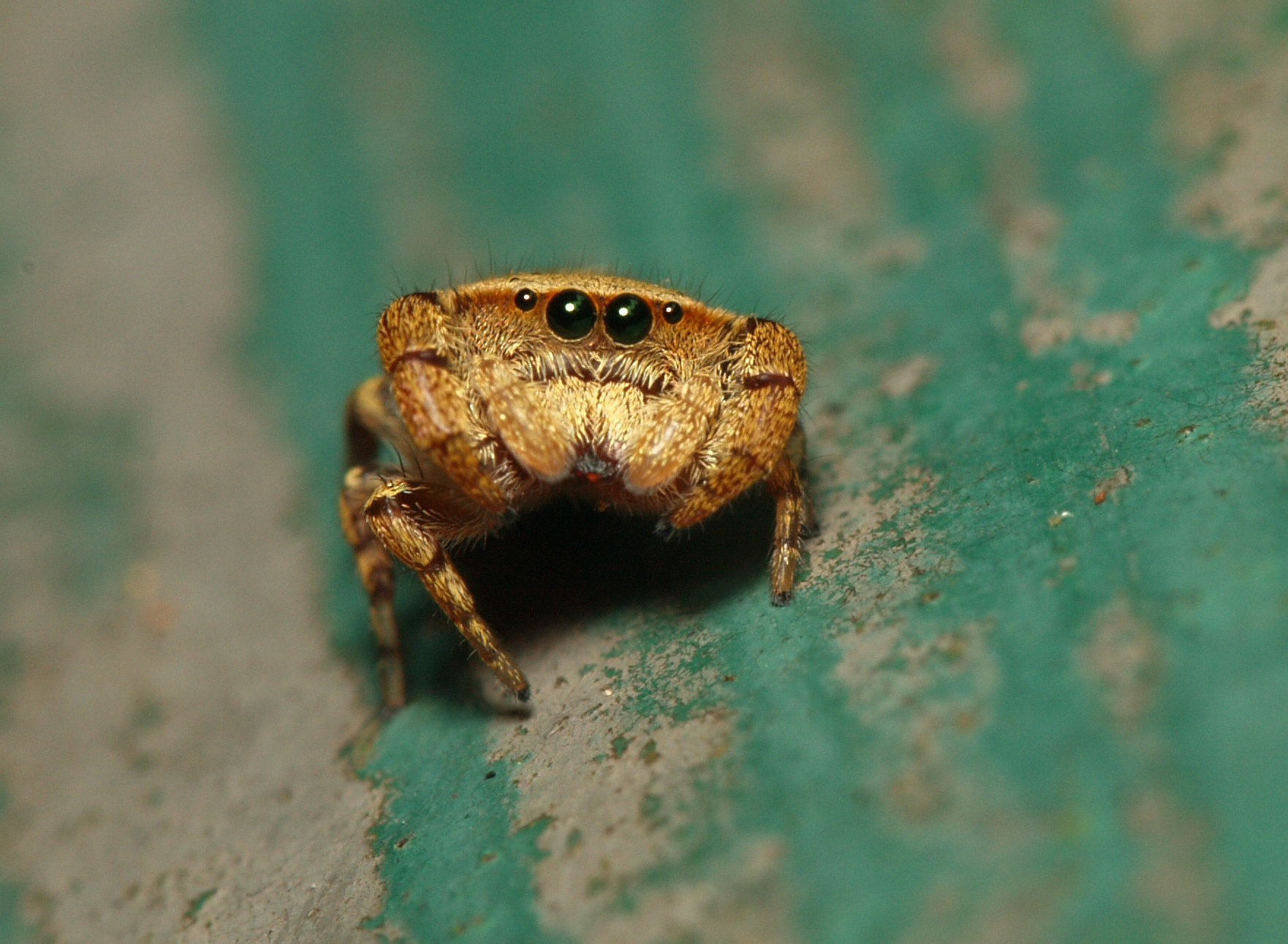
Female

Male (Koch 1848)

R. flavigera is a medium-sized jumping spider, with females reaching approximately 7 mm in length. The species exhibits sexual dimorphism typical of jumping spiders. The cephalothorax and legs are typically deep to light brown in coloration, while the abdomen shows variable coloration patterns.

The species is characterized by its broad, flat head and thick front legs. The abdomen and cephalothorax are covered with fine hairs and display brown coloration with white and black markings. The legs show distinctive black and pale white banding patterns.
