= Rhene setipes =

Scientific classification
- Kingdom: Animalia
- Phylum: Arthropoda
- Subphylum: Chelicerata
- Class: Arachnida
- Order: Araneae
- Infraorder: Araneomorphae
- Family: Salticidae
- Genus: Rhene
- Species: R. setipes

Binomial name
- Rhene setipes Żabka, 1985

Species of jumping spider

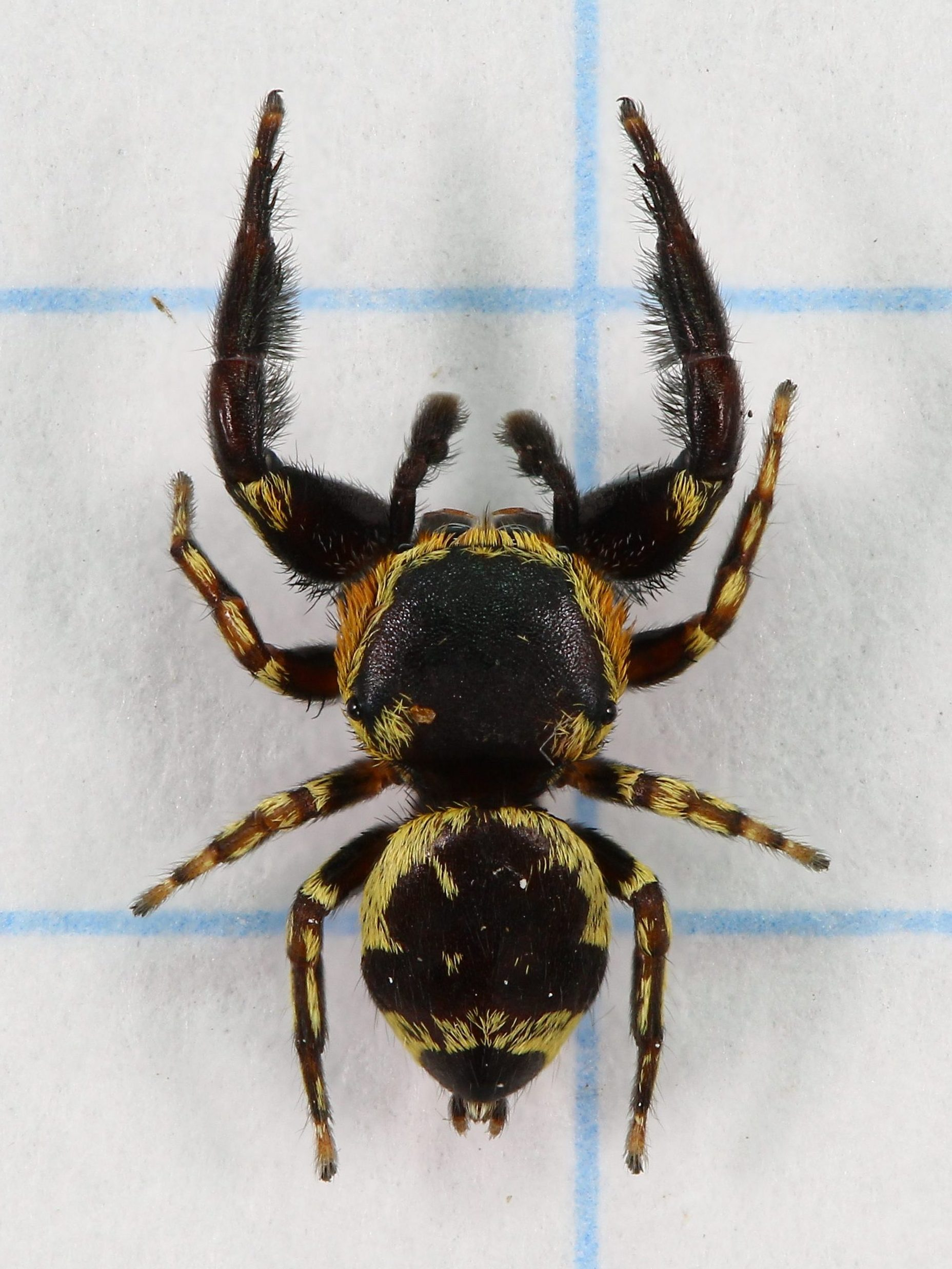
Rhene setipes

Rhene setipes is a species of jumping spider in the genus Rhene that lives in China, Japan and Vietnam. It was first identified in 1985.
