= Rhene cancer =

Scientific classification
- Kingdom: Animalia
- Phylum: Arthropoda
- Subphylum: Chelicerata
- Class: Arachnida
- Order: Araneae
- Infraorder: Araneomorphae
- Family: Salticidae
- Genus: Rhene
- Species: R. cancer

Binomial name
- Rhene cancer Wesołowska & Cumming, 2008

Species of jumping spider

Rhene cancer is a species of jumping spider in the genus Rhene that lives in Zimbabwe. The male was first described in 2008 while the female remains unknown. The spider is small, typically 4.4 mm (0.17 in) long and has a distinctive square forward section, or carapace, which is the source of its specific name, a Latin word that can be translated 'crab'. This helps distinguish it from other members of the genus, as well as distinctive its copulatory organs. Its palpal bulb is large and attached to its cymbium by a membranous haematodocha, but it is most clearly identified by the presence of a tuft of very long brown bristles on a bulge on its palpal tibia.

== Etymology and taxonomy ==
Rhene cancer is a species of jumping spider, a member of the family Salticidae, first described by the arachnologists Wanda Wesołowska and Meg Cumming in 2008. They allocated it to the genus Rhene, which is named after the Greek female name shared by mythological figures. The specific name is derived from a Latin word that can be translated 'crab', named after the shape of the spider.

First circumscribed in 1869 by Tamerlan Thorell, the genus Rhene is a part of the subtribe Dendryphantina in the tribe Dendryphantini. Wayne Maddison allocated the tribe to the subclade Simonida in the clade Saltafresia in the clade Salticoida. The genus is known for its good eyesight and its high level of spatial awareness, which is likely to show that it is recent in evolutionary terms. The holotype is stored at the Royal Museum for Central Africa in Tervuren.

== Description ==
Like many in the genus, Rhene cancer resembles a beetle. It is a small spider with a body is divided into two main parts: a cephalothorax and an abdomen. It is generally flat, hairy and thick-set. The male's carapace, the hard upper part of the cephalothorax, is typically 1.9 mm (0.075 in) in length, 2.1 mm (0.083 in) in width and 0.9 mm (0.035 in) in height. It is brown, nearly square and dominated by a trapezoid pitted eye field. It is covered in dense long grey hairs, with tufts of yellowish-fawn hairs near its eyes. The underside of the spider's cephalothorax, known as its sternum, is dark brown. The part of its face known as the clypeus is very low and brown. Its chelicerae has a single tooth visible at the front. The spider's remaining mouthparts, including its labium and maxillae are dark brown.

The male's abdomen is slightly longer than its carapace, measuring 2.5 mm (0.098 in) in length and 1.8 mm (0.071 in) in width. It is ovoid, flattened and dominated by a large shield-like scutum. Its upper side is reddish-brown marked with a pattern of two patches towards the rear made of white hairs and white stripes along its sides towards the front. The bottom of its abdomen is light brown. It has black spinnerets, as are its front legs, which are longer, broader and darker than the others. The rest of its legs are brown.

As well as its rectangular carapace, Rhene cancer can be distinguished from other species in its genus by its copulatory organs. The male's black pedipalps are blackish have a short papal tibia that has a very large hooked spike, or tibial apophysis, and a bulge marked with a tuft of very long brown bristles. This bump is particularly distinctive. The remainder of its copulatory organs include a large cymbium attached to a large, ovoid, very convex palpal bulb by a membranous haematodocha. There is a small projection called an embolus extending from the top of the haematodocha. The female has not been described.

== Distribution and habitat ==
Although Dendryphantine spiders a predominantly found in the Americas, members of Rhene species live in Africa and Eurasia. Rhene cancer is endemic to Zimbabwe. Its holotype was found living on the trunk of a Jacaranda mimosifolia tree.
