= Homalattus coriaceus =

Scientific classification
- Kingdom: Animalia
- Phylum: Arthropoda
- Subphylum: Chelicerata
- Class: Arachnida
- Order: Araneae
- Infraorder: Araneomorphae
- Family: Salticidae
- Genus: Homalattus
- Species: H. coriaceus

Binomial name
- Homalattus coriaceus Simon, 1902

Species of spider

Homalattus coriaceus is a species of jumping spider in the family Salticidae. It is found in Sierra Leone and South Africa.

== Distribution ==
Homalattus coriaceus is found in Sierra Leone and South Africa. Within South Africa, it is known only from Port Elizabeth in Eastern Cape Province at an altitude of 7 m.

== Habitat and ecology ==
This species is a free-living plant-dweller.

== Conservation ==
Homalattus coriaceus is listed as of Least Concern by the South African National Biodiversity Institute due to its wide geographic range in Africa. Additional sampling is needed to collect the male and to determine the species' range in South Africa.

== Taxonomy ==
Homalattus coriaceus was described by Simon in 1902 with type series from Sierra Leone and South Africa. The genus has not been revised.
