= Homalattus marshalli =

Scientific classification
- Kingdom: Animalia
- Phylum: Arthropoda
- Subphylum: Chelicerata
- Class: Arachnida
- Order: Araneae
- Infraorder: Araneomorphae
- Family: Salticidae
- Genus: Homalattus
- Species: H. marshalli

Binomial name
- Homalattus marshalli G.W.Peckham & E.G.Peckham, 1903

Species of jumping spider

Homalattus marshalli is a species of jumping spider in the family Salticidae.
