= Rhene obscura =

Scientific classification
- Kingdom: Animalia
- Phylum: Arthropoda
- Subphylum: Chelicerata
- Class: Arachnida
- Order: Araneae
- Infraorder: Araneomorphae
- Family: Salticidae
- Genus: Rhene
- Species: R. obscura

Binomial name
- Rhene obscura Wesołowska & van Harten, 2007

Species of jumping spider

Rhene obscura is a species of jumping spider in the genus Rhene that lives in Yemen. The female was first described in 2007 while the male remains unknown. It is generally dark brown, which is recalled in its specific name, which can be translated "dark". The spider is medium-sized, typically 6.4 mm (0.25 in) long and has very obvious vestigial indentations on its surface. It has relatively short dark brown legs, the front legs longer and thicker than the others. It is hard to distinguish from other members of the genus, although its copulatory organs are distinctive. It has a large, heavily sclerotized epigyne that has a ridge down the middle of its central depression, particularly long insemination ducts spermathecae that are larger than those found in related spiders.

== Etymology and taxonomy ==
Rhene obscura is a species of jumping spider, a member of the family Salticidae, first described by the arachnologists Wanda Wesołowska and Antony van Harten in 2007. They allocated it to the genus Rhene, which is named after the Greek female name shared by mythological figures. The specific name "obscura" is derived from a Latin word that can be translated 'dark', named after the generally dark look of the spider. Rhene was first circumscribed in 1869 by Tamerlan Thorell.

== Description ==
Like many in the genus, Rhene obscura resembles a beetle. It is a medium-sized spider with a body is divided into two main parts: a cephalothorax and an abdomen. The male's carapace, the hard upper part of the cephalothorax, is typically 3.1 mm (0.12 in) in length, 2.3 mm (0.091 in) in width and 0.8 mm (0.031 in) in height. It is flat dark brown and covered in short brown hairs with an eye field shaped like a trapezium. The part of its face known as the clypeus is very low and brown. Its chelicerae are dark brown with a single tooth at the back and two at the front. The spider's remaining mouthparts, including its labium and maxillae are dark brown.

The female's abdomen is slightly larger than its carapace, measuring 3.3 mm (0.13 in) in length and 2.5 mm (0.098 in) in width. It is oval and has very obvious vestigial indentations on its surface. The top of its abdomen is dark brown and covered in short delicate hairs. The bottom of its abdomen is darker. It has brown spinnerets. The spider's legs are generally short, although the front legs are longer and broader than the others, which also feature a few orange segments. They have brown leg hairs.

Rhene obscura has distinctive copulatory organs. It has a large epigyne, the external visible part of its copulatory organs, that shows pronounced sclerotization. It has a shallow depression in the middle and copulatory openings that are hidden in sclerotized basket-like features. The spider's insemination ducts are particularly long and lead to relatively large spermathecae, or receptacles. Compared to the related Rhene formosa, there is a ridge in the middle of the central depression, larger spermathecae and copulatory openings that are further apart. The male has not been described.

== Distribution ==
Although Dendryphantine spiders a predominantly found in the Americas, Rhene spiders live in Africa and Eurasia. Rhene obscura is endemic to Yemen.
