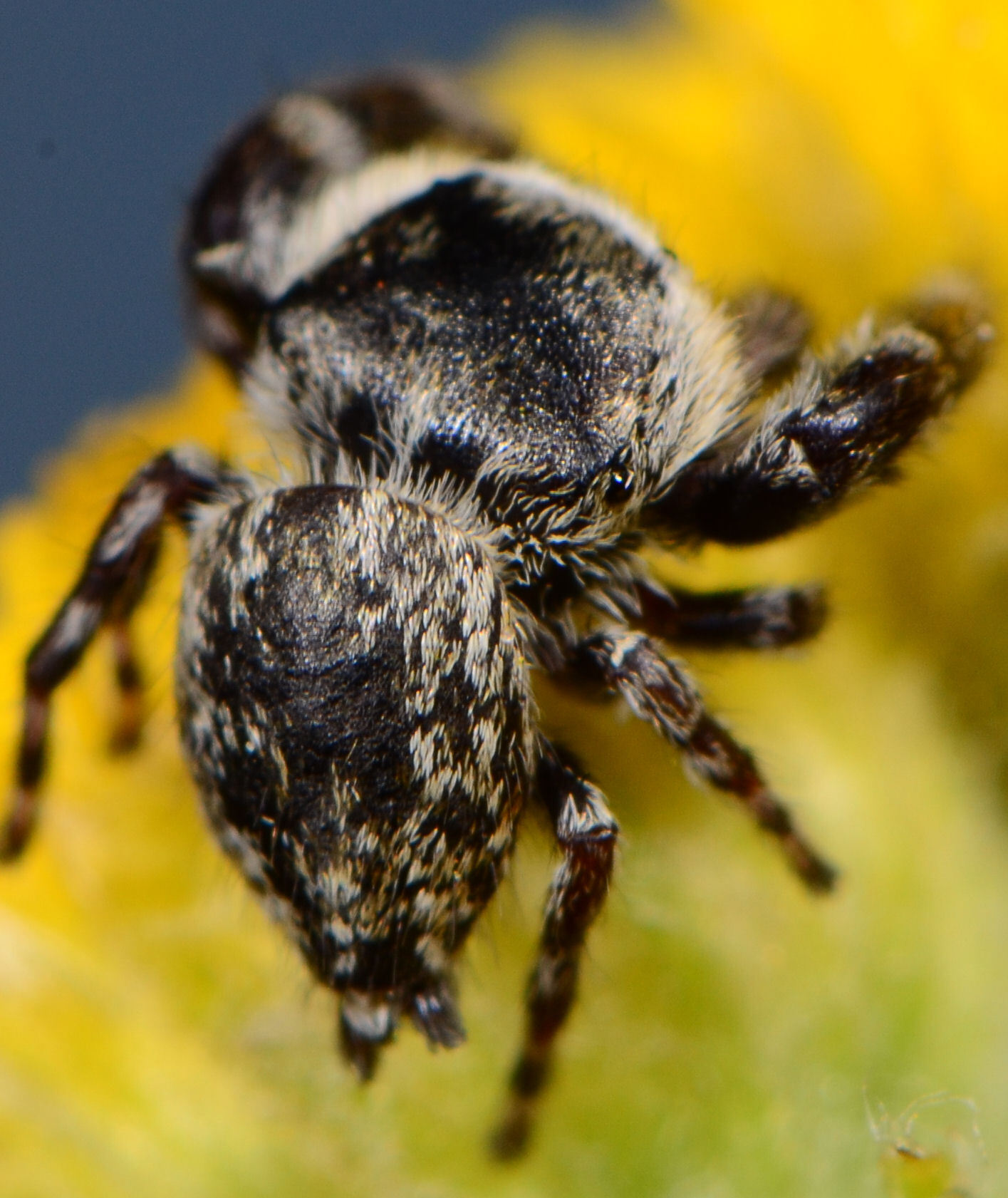
- Female from South Africa
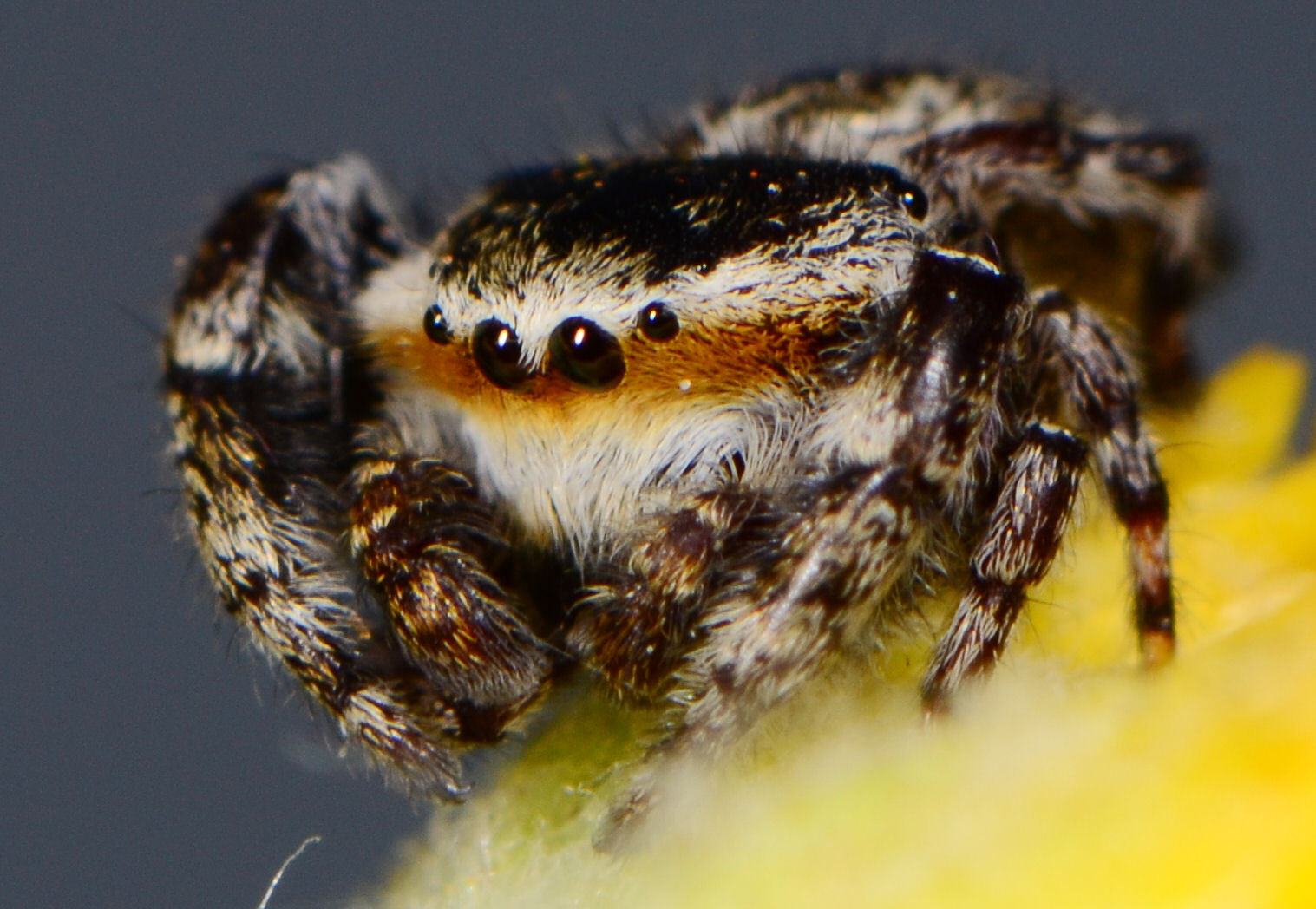

Scientific classification
- Kingdom: Animalia
- Phylum: Arthropoda
- Subphylum: Chelicerata
- Class: Arachnida
- Order: Araneae
- Infraorder: Araneomorphae
- Family: Salticidae
- Genus: Rhene
- Species: R. lingularis

Binomial name
- Rhene lingularis Haddad & Wesołowska, 2011

= Rhene lingularis =

Species of jumping spider

Rhene lingularis is a species of jumping spider that can be found in Kenya and South Africa. A member of the genus Rhene, it lives in both grassland and shrubland. First described in 2011, the male spider is distinguished by its tongue-shaped embolus, from which its species name derives. The shape of the spider is typical of the genus and resembles a beetle. It is small, typically 4.5 mm (0.18 in) long, dark brown, hairy, and has a pattern of two pairs of longitudinal lines on its top and diagonal lines on its sides, all formed of white hairs. Its first and second row of eyes are very close together and its front pair of legs are longer than its others. The female of the species has not been described.

== Taxonomy and etymology ==
Rhene lingularis is a species of jumping spider, a member of the family Salticidae, that was first described by the arachnologists Charles Haddad and Wanda Wesołowska in 2011. It is one of over 500 different species identified by Wesołowska during her career. They allocated it to the genus Rhene, which is named after the Greek female name shared by mythological figures. The specific name derives from the Latin word lingula, meaning "tongue", and refers to the distinctive shape of the male spider's embolus.

First circumscribed in 1869 by Tamerlan Thorell, the genus Rhene is a part of the subtribe Dendryphantina in the tribe Dendryphantini. Wayne Maddison allocated the tribe to the subclade Simonida in the clade Saltafresia in the clade Salticoida. It is related to the genera Dendryphantes and Macaroeris. The genus is also similar to Homalattus. In 2017, Jerzy Prószyński designated it a member of a group of genera named Dendryphantines after the genus Dendryphantes. He also wrote that it is similar to the genera that are related to Simaetha, a group he named Simaethines, particularly in the shape of spider's body. The genus is known for its good eyesight and its high level of spatial awareness, which is likely to show that it is recent in evolutionary terms.

== Description ==
Like many in the genus, Rhene lingularis resembles a beetle. Its body shape is typical for the genus and is divided into two main parts: a forward cephalothorax and, behind that, an abdomen. The male's carapace, the hard upper part of the cephalothorax, is brown and has light hairs on its top, longer at its sides, and has a whitish band of hairs towards the back. It has a typical length of 1.9 mm (0.07 in) and width of 2.2 mm (0.09 in). The spider's area around its eyes dominates the carapace and is black and pitted. The spider's first and second row of eyes are very close together.

The male spider's abdomen is typically 2.6 mm (0.10 in) long and 2.2 mm (0.09 in) wide. It is dark brown and has a pattern of light hairs that form two pairs of longitudinal lines on its top and diagonal lines on its sides. Its spinnerets, used for spinning webs, are darker. The front pair of legs are robust and covered in long dense hairs. It has two pairs of ventral spines. The remaining legs are shorter and brown. Its pedipalps are darker.

The spider has distinctive copulatory organs. And the end of its pedipalp, the male's palpal tibia is blunt and has a short stumpy appendage, or tibial apophysis that ends in a slightly hooked spike. It has a rounded shell-like cymbium. Attached to towards its root is a bulgy palpal bulb. The internal duct is divided into two sections. Near the top of the bulb it arches over. At the end of the bulb is an embolus that curves up away from the bulb into an indentation in its cymbium. The distinctive embolus is longer than other members of the genus. The female of the species has not been described.

== Distribution and habitat ==
The species has been found in Kenya and South Africa. In South Africa, it has been found in Free State and Western Cape, covering a range of over 1,000 km (620 mi). In Kenya, it has been seen near Lake Naivasha. The spider lives in grasslands and amongst shrubland known as Fynbos.
