= Homalattus obscurus =

Homalattus Jumping Spider

Scientific classification
- Kingdom: Animalia
- Phylum: Arthropoda
- Subphylum: Chelicerata
- Class: Arachnida
- Order: Araneae
- Infraorder: Araneomorphae
- Family: Salticidae
- Genus: Homalattus
- Species: H. obscurus

Binomial name
- Homalattus obscurus Peckham & Peckham, 1903

Species of spider

Homalattus obscurus is a South African species of jumping spider in the family Salticidae.

== Distribution ==
Homalattus obscurus is endemic to South Africa, where it has been sampled only from Bergvliet Forest Station in Mpumalanga Province at an altitude of 7 m.

== Habitat and ecology ==
This species is a free-living plant dweller.

== Conservation ==
Homalattus obscurus is listed as Data Deficient by the South African National Biodiversity Institute due to its small geographic range. Additional sampling is needed to collect the male and to determine the species' range.

== Taxonomy ==
Homalattus obscurus was described by George and Elizabeth Peckham in 1903 with types from Mpumalanga.
