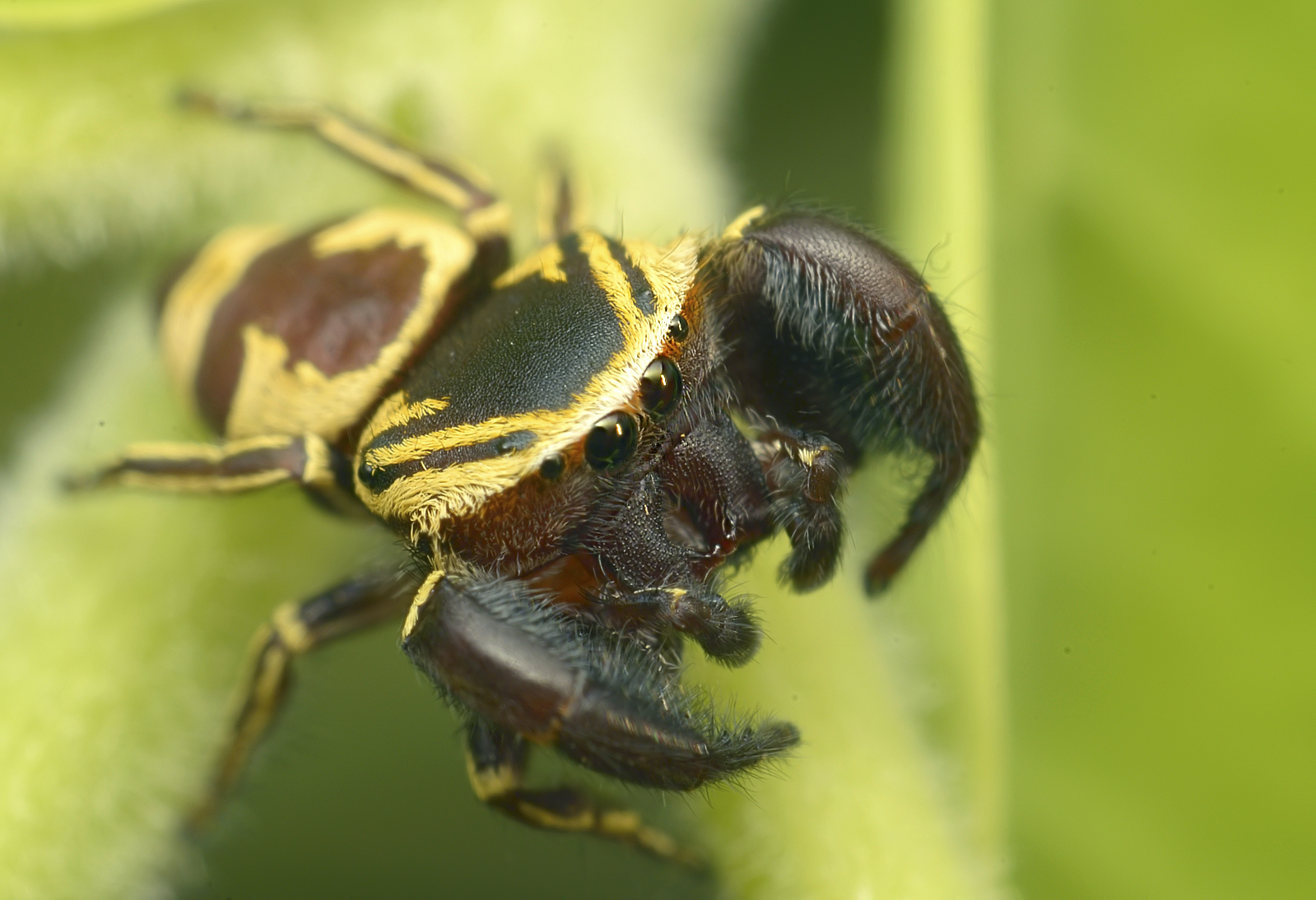
- male from India
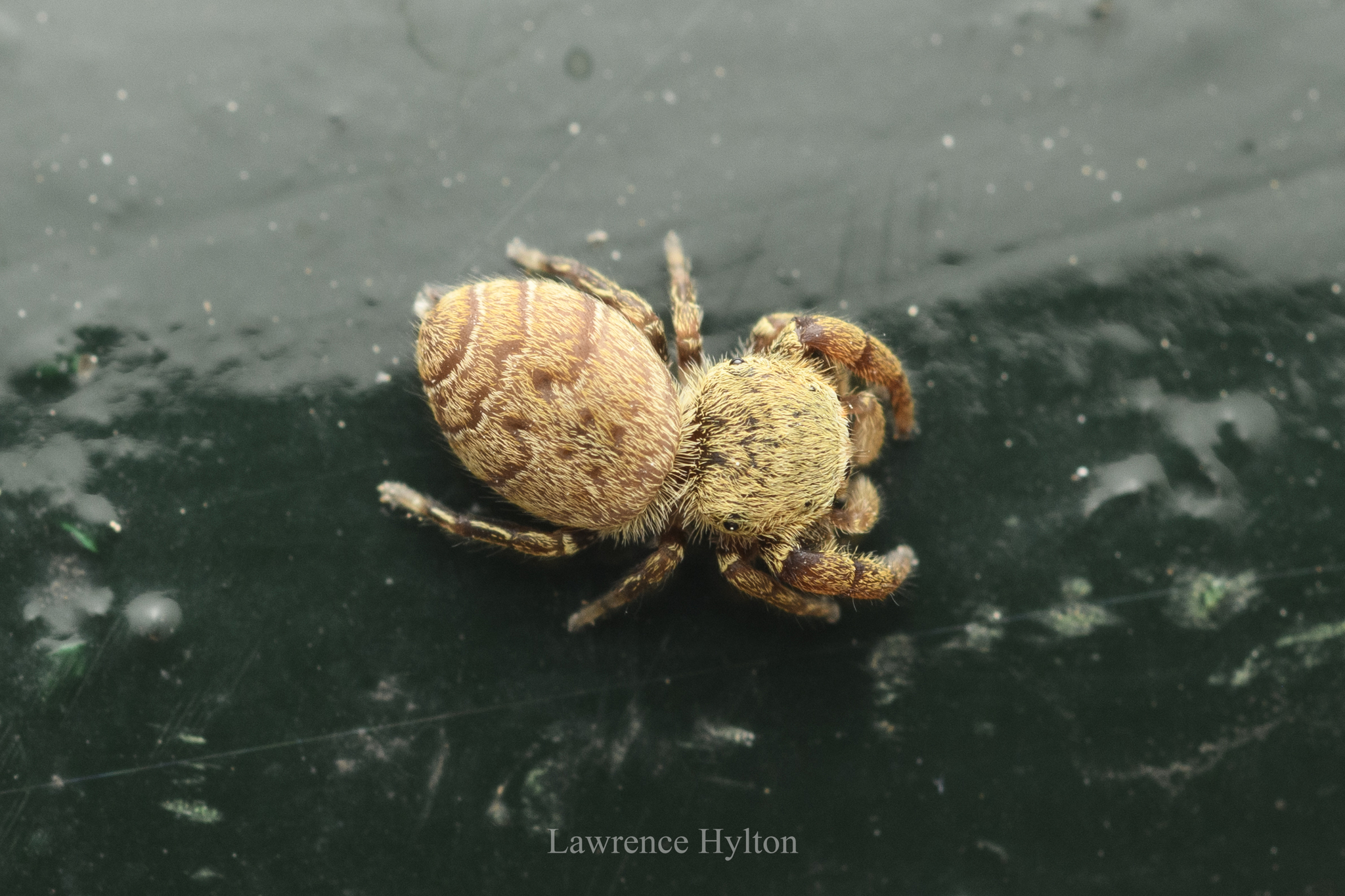
- female from Hong Kong

Scientific classification
- Kingdom: Animalia
- Phylum: Arthropoda
- Subphylum: Chelicerata
- Class: Arachnida
- Order: Araneae
- Infraorder: Araneomorphae
- Family: Salticidae
- Genus: Rhene
- Species: R. flavicomans

Binomial name
- Rhene flavicomans Simon, 1902

Synonyms
- Rhene biembolusa Song & Chai, 1991

= Rhene flavicomans =

Wasp-mimic jumping spider

Species of spider

Rhene flavicomans, known as the wasp-mimic jumping spider, is a species of spider in the genus Rhene. It is found in Bhutan, China, India, Nepal, Sri Lanka, Thailand and Vietnam.

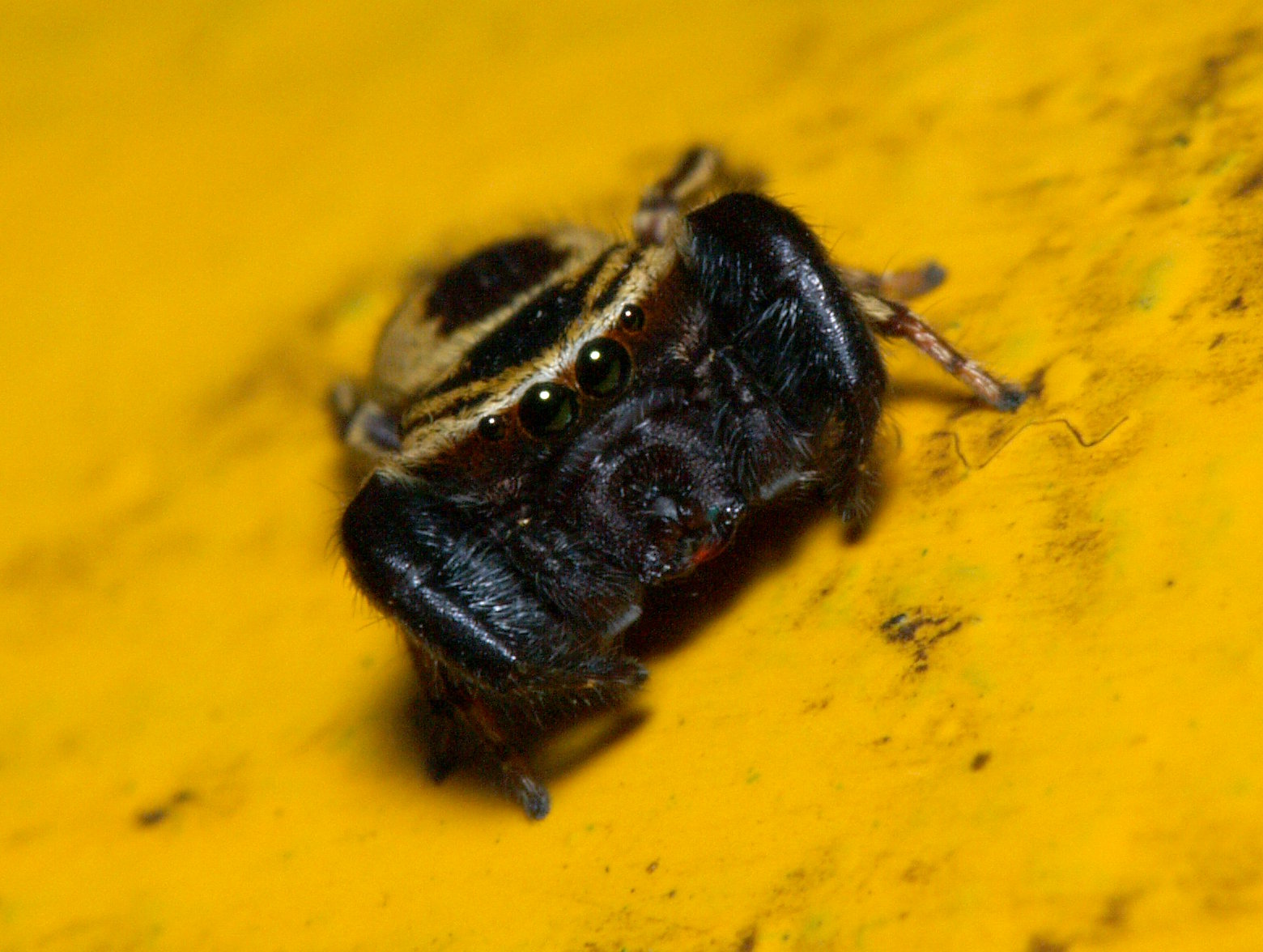
Front view of male from Hong Kong

== Taxonomy ==
Rhene flavicomans was first described by Eugène Simon in 1902 based on a male specimen. The species was later redescribed by Prószyński in 1984, who provided detailed diagnostic drawings and first described the female.

In 1991, Song and Chai described Rhene biembolusa from Hainan, China. This species was later synonymized with R. flavicomans by Caleb et al. in 2022, who demonstrated that R. biembolusa represented the same taxon.

== Description ==
Rhene flavicomans exhibits sexual dimorphism typical of jumping spiders. Males measure 4.76–5.90 mm in body length, while females are slightly smaller at 3.40–5.00 mm.

The cephalothorax is described as dark brown with a glossy appearance, covered with yellowish setae. The eye arrangement follows the typical salticid pattern, with the anterior median eyes being the largest. The abdomen is oval-shaped with distinctive coloration patterns that vary between sexes.

The male of the species shows adaptations has a wasp-mimicking pattern, which may provide Batesian mimicry protection from predators.

== Distribution ==
R. flavicomans has a broad distribution across South and Southeast Asia. The species has been recorded from Bhutan, China (including Guangdong, Guangxi, Hainan, and Yunnan provinces), India, Nepal, Sri Lanka, Thailand, and Vietnam. This wide distribution suggests the species is well-adapted to various tropical and subtropical habitats across the region.

== Type specimens ==
The holotype male is deposited in the Muséum national d'histoire naturelle (MNHN) in Paris, France. Additional type material from the synonymized R. biembolusa is housed in the Institute of Zoology, Chinese Academy of Sciences (IZCAS) in Beijing, China.
