= Rhene pinguis =

Scientific classification
- Kingdom: Animalia
- Phylum: Arthropoda
- Subphylum: Chelicerata
- Class: Arachnida
- Order: Araneae
- Infraorder: Araneomorphae
- Family: Salticidae
- Genus: Rhene
- Species: R. pinguis

Binomial name
- Rhene pinguis Wesołowska & Haddad, 2009

Species of jumping spider

Rhene pinguis is a species of jumping spider in the genus Rhene. The male was first identified in 2009 and the female in 2018. The species is only found in the Ndumo Game Reserve, South Africa. It is flat and hairy. The upper part of the cephalothorax, or carapace, is trapezoid and dominated by a large trapezoid eye field. The female has spots formed of white hairs near its eyes. The male has a large scutum on its abdomen as well as front legs that are fatter than the others. The spider's copulatory organs are distinctive. The female has a round embolus with short insemination looping ducts that run from the middle of its copulatory openings. The male has a small palpal tibia that has a hooked projection, or tibial apophysis and an embolus that has a vane on its tip that distinguishes it from related spiders.

== Etymology and taxonomy ==
Rhene pinguis is a species of jumping spider, a member of the family Salticidae, that was first described by Wanda Wesołowska and Charles Haddad in 2013. They allocated it to the genus Rhene, which is named after the Greek female name shared by mythological figures. The specific name "pinguis", means fat or thick, and relates to the swollen look of the spider.

First circumscribed in 1869 by Tamerlan Thorell, the genus Rhene is a part of the subtribe Dendryphantina in the tribe Dendryphantini. Wayne Maddison allocated the tribe to the subclade Simonida in the clade Saltafresia in the clade Salticoida. It is related to the genera Dendryphantes and Macaroeris. The genus is also similar to Homalattus. In 2017, Jerzy Prószyński designated it a member of a group of genera named Dendryphantines after the genus Dendryphantes. He also noted that it is similar to the genera related to Simaetha, a group he named Simaethines, particularly in the shape of spider's body. The genus is known for its good eyesight and its high level of spatial awareness, which is likely to show that it is recent in evolutionary terms.

== Description ==
Like many in the genus, Rhene pinguis resembles a beetle. The spider was first identified in 2009, with initially only the male described by Wesołowska and Haddad. The female was first described in 2018 by the same team. The spider is hairy, thickset, and very flat. The spider's body is divided into two main parts: a cephalothorax and an abdomen. The male's carapace, the hard upper part of the cephalothorax, is brown and covered in dense brown hairs, with a small number of white scales visible near the back. It is nearly square in shape and typically has a length of 1.7 mm (0.07 in) and width of 1.8 mm (0.07 in). The spider's eye field is large and trapezoid, dominating the majority of the upper surface. There are black rings around the eyes, some of which are placed close together. The underside of the cephalothorax, or sternum, is dark brown. The spider's face, known as the clypeus, is dark and very low. Its mouthparts, its chelicerae, labium and maxillae are dark brown, and it has a single tooth visible.

The spider's abdomen is very flat, rounded and overlaps the carapace at the front. It is typically 2 mm (0.08 in) long and 1.6 mm (0.06 in) wide and has a pattern of white patches formed of hairs near its spinnerets and six more white patches in the middle. The abdomen is dominated by a dark brown scutum on the top, the underside being a lighter brown. Most of the spider's legs are brown with yellow segments. In contrast, its front legs are black and covered in black hairs. They have two spines and are larger and thicker than the others.

Rhene pinguis has distinctive copulatory organs. Its pedipalps are brown with a hairy cymbium that overshadows its similarly large but convex and bulging tegulum. There is a meandering spermophore inside the tegulum and a very short embolus emanating from the haematodocha at the top. The small palpal tibia has a short hooked projection, called a tibial apophysis. The embolus has a wide vane at its tip that distinguishes the species from others in the genus.

The female has a cephalothorax that has a length between 1.2 and 1.5 mm (0.05 and 0.06 in) and width of between 1.2 and 1.4 mm (0.06 in) It is similarly flattened with a dark brown carapace and has a similarly large trapezoidal eye field. There are small spots formed of white hairs between the eyes and a stripe down the middle of its carapace. Its sternum is brown, as are its mouthparts, although there are light tips at the end of its labium and maxillae. Its abdomen is a brown oval that measures between 1.4 and 2.0 mm in length and between 1.3 and 1.6 in width. It has a covering of dense brown hairs and a pattern of fourteen white spots arranged in pairs along its back. The underside of its abdomen is darker and its spinnerets are brown. Its legs are all light brown and short with white hairs visible on some sections.

The female spider has a round epigyne with two copulatory openings to the front that are plugged with a waxy secretion. They lead via basket-like structures that show high levels of sclerotization that hide their path as it winds to the sides to two thin insemination ducts that sit in the middle of the openings. The ducts loop twice before entering two similarly sclerotized spermathecae, or receptacles.The epigyne differs from Rhene formosa in details, including having shorter insemination ducts and larger spermathecae. It also lacks the accessory glands connected near the start of the insemination ducts that characterise the otherwise similar Rhene hexagon.

== Distribution and habitat ==
Although Dendryphantine spiders a predominantly found in the Americas, Rhene spiders live in Africa and Eurasia. Rhene pinguis is endemic to South Africa. It has only been found in the Ndumo Game Reserve In KwaZulu-Natal. The first specimen was found in 2000 living amongst the small shrubs. It lives in trees, including the canopy of Albizia versicolor and Ficus sycomorus trees.

== See also ==
Drawings of Rhene pinguis.
