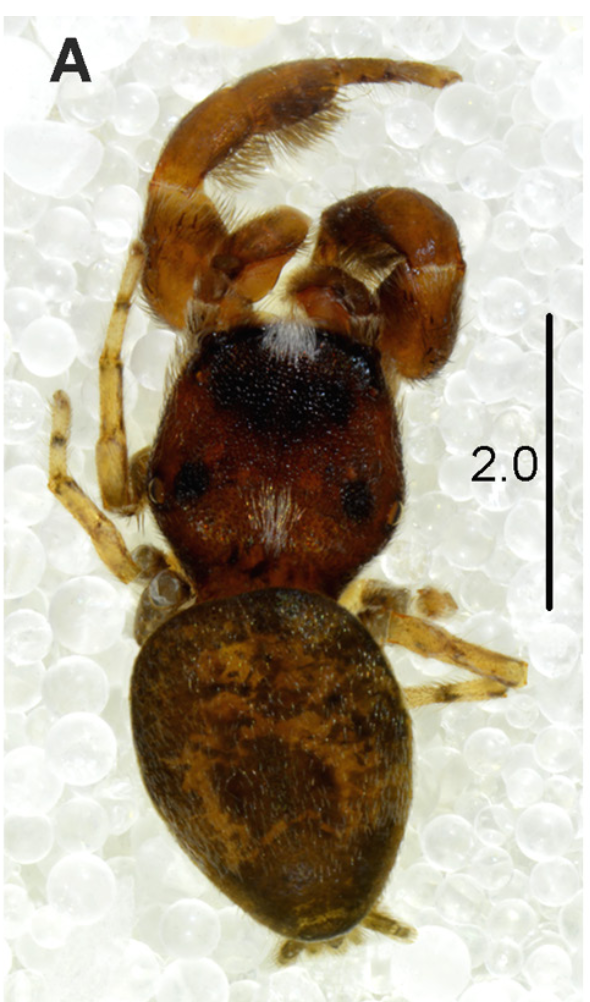
- Male paratype

Scientific classification
- Kingdom: Animalia
- Phylum: Arthropoda
- Subphylum: Chelicerata
- Class: Arachnida
- Order: Araneae
- Infraorder: Araneomorphae
- Family: Salticidae
- Genus: Rhene
- Species: R. hexagon

Binomial name
- Rhene hexagon Wiśniewski & Wesołowska, 2024

= Rhene hexagon =

Species of jumping spider

Rhene hexagon is a species of jumping spider that lives in the forests of Uganda. A beetle-like member of the genus Rhene, the spider has a forward section, or cephalothorax, that is between 1.8 and 2 mm (0.07 and 0.08 in) long and, behind that, an abdomen that is between 2.2 and 2.5 mm (0.09 and 0.10 in) long. The top of its cephalothorax, its carapace, has a characteristic shape, being in the form of a hexagon, which is reflected in the species' specific name. It is generally dark brown, apart from the bottom of its abdomen, which is lighter, and has two white patches near its eyes and, in the case of the female, a white stripe across its abdomen. The female also differs from the male in its legs. The female has brown legs while the male, although its front pair of legs are dark brown, has mainly yellow legs. It has distinctive copulatory organs, particularly the shape of the tip of the male's embolus at the top of its palpal bulb and the female's accessory glands positioned near the entrance of its short insemination ducts. The species was first described in 2024.

== Etymology and taxonomy ==
Rhene hexagon is a species of jumping spider, a member of the family Salticidae. The spider was first described by arachnologists Konrad Wiśniewski and Wanda Wesołowska in 2024. They allocated it to the genus Rhene, which is named after the Greek female name shared by mythological figures. The specific name refers to the shape of the spider's carapace.

== Description ==
Like many in the genus, Rhene hexagon resembles a beetle. The spider's body is divided into two main parts: a cephalothorax and an abdomen. The male's cephalothorax has a length of typically 2 mm (0.08 in) and a typical width of 1.8 mm (0.07 in) while the female is typically 1.8 mm long and 1.7 mm wide. The spider's carapace, the hard upper part of the cephalothorax, is hexagonal with a widest point that is aligned with the rearmost row or eyes. here are also dense brown hairs around the edge. It is mainly dark brown, except the pitted eye field, which is almost black. There are brown bristles and a patch formed of white hairs in the front row of eyes and a similar patch behind the eye field. Its mouthparts, including its labium and maxillae, are brown.

Its abdomen is ovoid that is dark brown on top and a lighter brown underneath. It is covered in shiny hairs. The female's abdomen is typically 2.2 mm (0.09 in) long and 1.8 mm wide while the male is larger, typically 2.5 mm (0.10 in) long and 1.8 mm wide. The female's abdomen has a wide stripe on its rear half made up of white hairs and a lighter front edge than the male. The female's legs are brown, the front legs having a small number of white hairs. The male spider's legs are mainly yellow with some brown streaks. Its front legs are different; they are longer and thicker than the others and dark brown with dense long hairs visible on their surface. The spider's spinnerets are brownish-grey.

Rhene hexagon is similar to other spiders in the genus, particularly the related Rhene pinguis. It can be distinguished by its distinctive copulatory organs, which, in the case of the male, are centred on its brownish pedipalps. The male's palpal tibia has a hooked projection, called a tibial apophysis. Its cymbium is smooth, as is its palpal bulb apart from bulges on its left side and bottom. There is a meandering spermophore inside its relatively large tegulum, the main body of the palpal bulb, and, projecting from the top, a wide embolus that has a rounded end. The shape of the embolus helps distinguish the spider from other members of the Rhene genus, particularly the way that it bends at its tip.

The female spider has a rounded epigyne with two copulatory openings near the front that are hidden in cup-like indentations that show strong evidence of sclerotization. These lead via long thin insemination ducts to long curved and semi-circular spermathecae, or receptacles. Near to the entrance there are relatively small accessory glands. Compared to Rhene pinguis, this spider's insemination ducts are shorter while the other species also lacks accessory glands near the entrance to the insemination ducts.

== Distribution and habitat ==
Although Dendryphantine spiders are predominantly found in the Americas, species of Rhene live in Africa and Eurasia. Rhene hexagon is endemic to Uganda. The holotype was discovered living amongst the trees of the Budongo Forest in 1995 and other specimens have subsequently been found in the local area.
