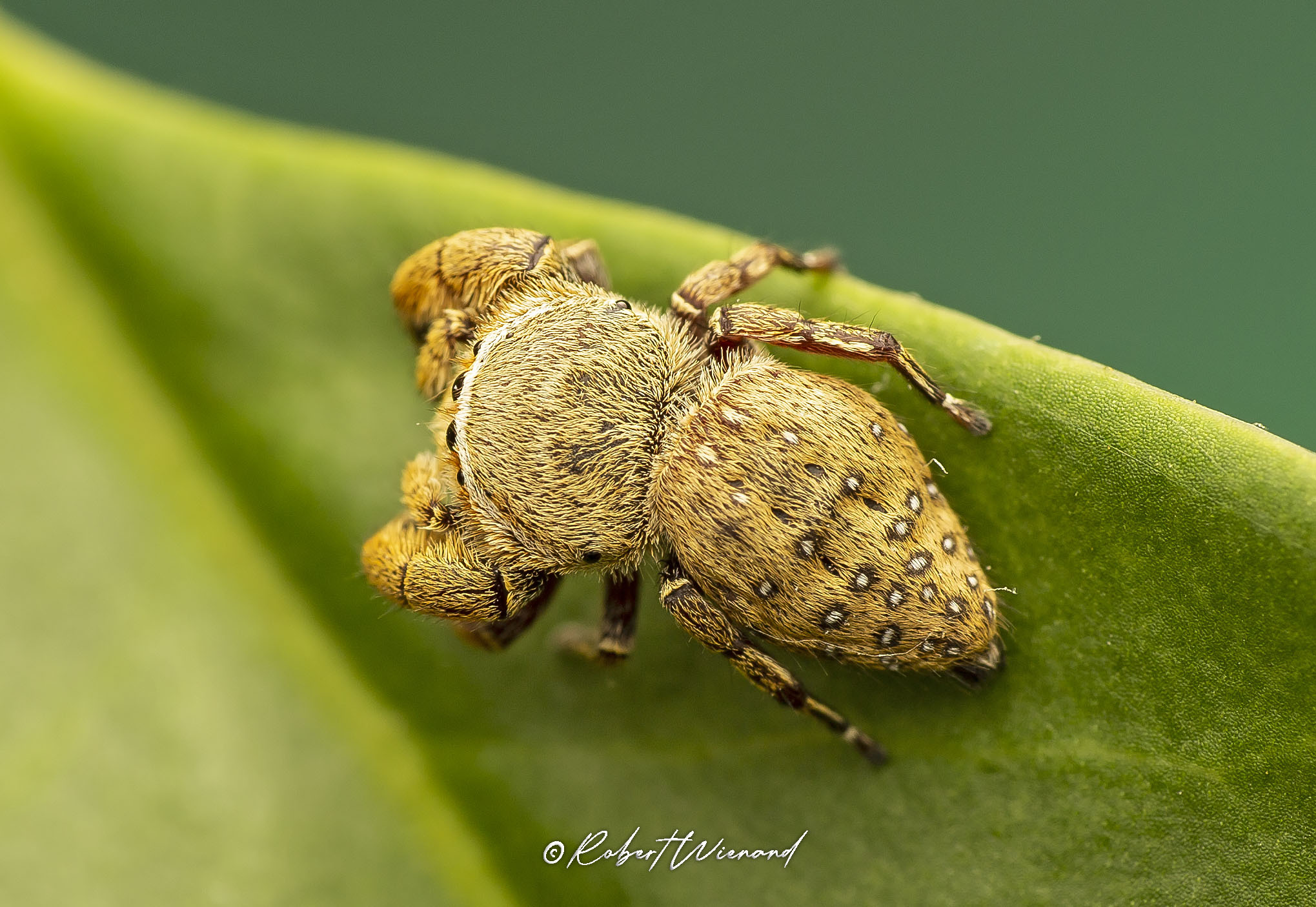
- female H. punctatus
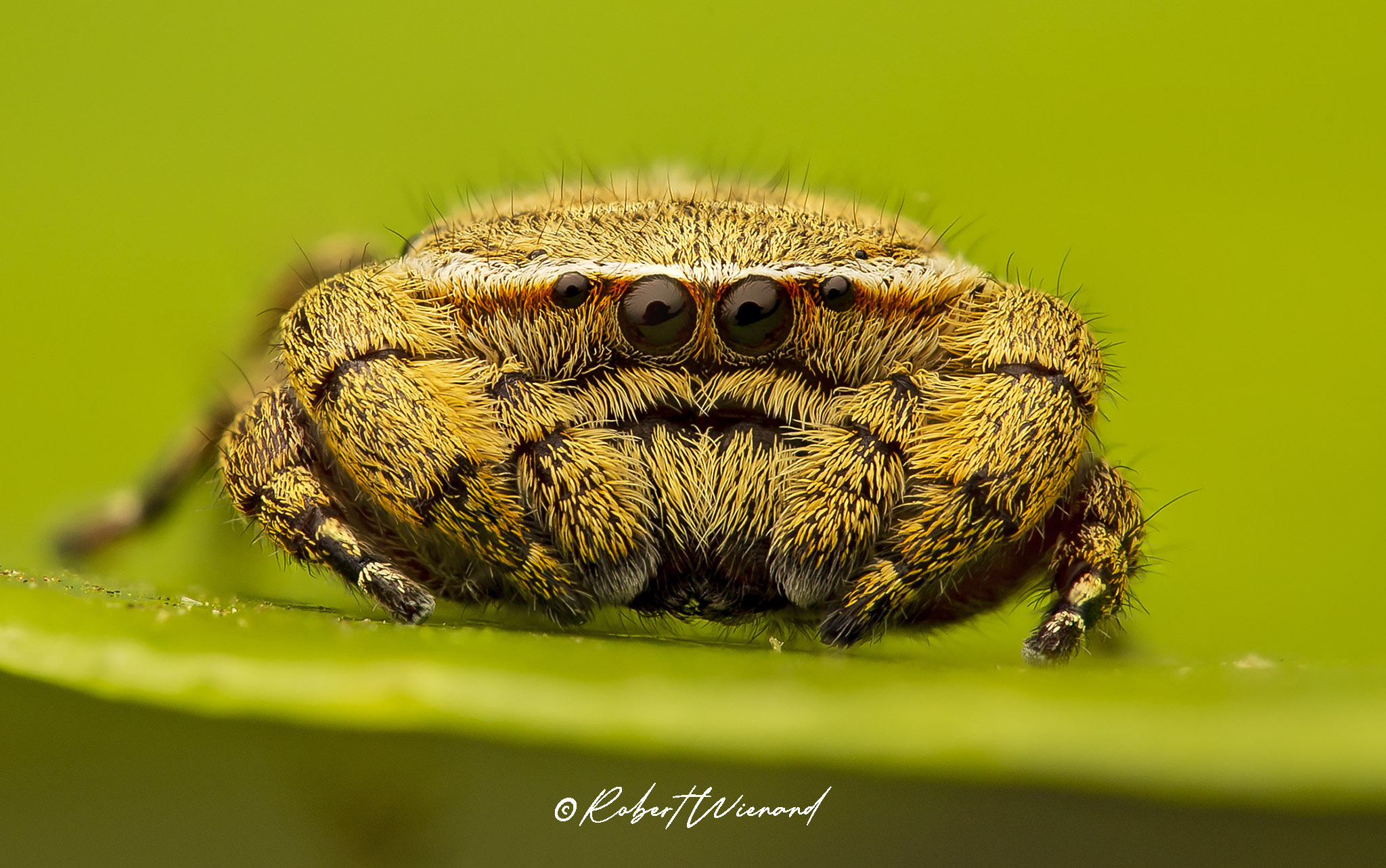
- female H. punctatus

Scientific classification
- Kingdom: Animalia
- Phylum: Arthropoda
- Subphylum: Chelicerata
- Class: Arachnida
- Order: Araneae
- Infraorder: Araneomorphae
- Family: Salticidae
- Subfamily: Salticinae
- Genus: Homalattus; White, 1841

Type species
- Salticus pustulatus White, 1841

Species
- See text.

= Homalattus =

Genus of spiders

Homalattus is an African genus of the spider family Salticidae (jumping spiders).

== Distribution ==
All but one of the described species are found in South Africa, four of them endemic. H. coriaceus is also found in Sierra Leone, and the type species H. pustulatus has only been found in Sierra Leone.

== Description ==
Members of this genus have a total length of 3–5 mm.

The carapace is flat and transverse, not as wide as the body, and covered with papillae. The eyes are located on short elevations of the thorax and are arranged in three rows, with the front row comprising four eyes placed on the front margin of the carapace at nearly equal distances from each other. The two intermediate eyes are the largest.

The abdomen is flat and compressed, as broad as long, somewhat convex above in front and straight, somewhat pointed behind with rounded sides.

The leg formula is 4123, with the first pair being the stoutest. The tibia I is longer than the patella and armed, while the metatarsus I is longer than the tarsus.

== Lifestyle ==
Homalattus species are free-living plant dwellers.

== Taxonomy ==
The genus Homalattus has not been revised.

== Species ==
As of October 2025, this genus includes six species:

- Homalattus coriaceus Simon, 1902 – Sierra Leone, South Africa
- Homalattus marshalli G. W. Peckham & E. G. Peckham, 1903 – South Africa
- Homalattus obscurus G. W. Peckham & E. G. Peckham, 1903 – South Africa
- Homalattus punctatus G. W. Peckham & E. G. Peckham, 1903 – South Africa
- Homalattus pustulatus (White, 1841) – Sierra Leone (type species)
- Homalattus similis G. W. Peckham & E. G. Peckham, 1903 – South Africa
