= Rhene plumata =

Scientific classification
- Kingdom: Animalia
- Phylum: Arthropoda
- Subphylum: Chelicerata
- Class: Arachnida
- Order: Araneae
- Infraorder: Araneomorphae
- Family: Salticidae
- Genus: Rhene
- Species: R. plumata

Binomial name
- Rhene plumata Haddad, Wiśniewski & Wesołowska, 2024

Species of jumping spider

Rhene plumata is a species of jumping spider that lives in Mozambique. It is a small spider that resembles a beetle, measuring between 3.1 and 3.9 mm (0.12 and 0.15 in) in total length. The male and female are generally similar, although one female specimen was much lighter than the others. In general, the spider is brown apart from the underside of its abdomen, which is yellowish-grey and marked with translucent silver spots that are made of internal guanine crystals. The first pair of the male's legs are longer and thicker than the others. The female's legs are mainly yellow, the male's yellow and brown. It can most be distinguished from other spiders in the genus Rhene by its covering of tufts of white hairs, after which it is named, as plumata is the Latin word for 'feathered'. Its fluffy appearance means that it can mimic insects like green lacewings and scale insects. The spider was first described in 2024.

== Etymology and taxonomy ==
Rhene plumata is a species of jumping spider, a member of the family Salticidae, that was first described by the arachnologists Charles R. Haddad, Konrad Wiśniewski and Wanda Wesołowska in 2024. It was one of over 500 species identified by Wesołowska during her career. They allocated it to the genus Rhene, which is named after the Greek female name shared by mythological figures. Its specific name is a Latin word that can be translated 'feathered' and relates to the tufts of white hair on its body. The holotype is stored in the National Collection of Arachnida at the Plant Protection Research Institute in Pretoria.

First circumscribed in 1869 by Tamerlan Thorell, the genus Rhene is a part of the subtribe Dendryphantina in the tribe Dendryphantini. Wayne Maddison allocated the tribe to the subclade Simonida in the clade Saltafresia in the clade Salticoida as part of his 2015 phylogenetic classification. It is related to the genera Dendryphantes and Macaroeris. The genus is also similar to Homalattus. In 2017, Jerzy Prószyński designated it a member of a group of genera named Dendryphantines after the genus Dendryphantes. He also noted that it is similar to the genera related to Simaetha, a group he named Simaethines, particularly in the shape of the spider's body.

== Description ==
Spiders of the genus Rhene resemble a beetle. Rhene plumata is a very flat, thickset and hairy spider. Like the related Rhene cooperi and Rhene legitima, it is covered in dense white hairs. The fluffy appearance of the spider means that it can mimic insects like green lacewings and scale insects.

The spider's body is divided into two main parts: a forward rounded section, known as its cephalothorax, and, behind that, an oval abdomen The male's cephalothorax is typically 1.9 mm (0.07 in) long and 1.7 mm (0.07 in) wide. Its carapace, the hard upper part of the cephalothorax, is flat and brown with a pitted surface and a covering of dense white hairs that form a distinctive pattern. The spider's eye field is large and trapezoid. Its first and second rows of eyes are set close to each other. The underside of its cephalothorax, known as its sternum, is dark brown. The part of the spider's face called its clypeus is low and has a mat of long white hairs. There is a single tooth visible in its chelicerae. Its remaining mouthparts, including its labium and maxillae, are dark brown.

The male's abdomen is heart-shaped and is typically 2.2 mm (0.09 in) long and 1.7 mm (0.07 in) wide. It is golden brown on its upper surface, with a covering of white hairs, interspersed with a scattering of longer bristles, and a pattern of four rows of patches of white hairs. The last row is decorated with tufts of very long white feather-shaped fine hairs or setae. There is also a row of long white setae along the front of the abdomen. The underside of its abdomen is yellowish-grey apart from a set of translucent silver spots that are made of internal guanine crystals. Its spinnerets, which it uses to spin webs, are yellowish. Its front pair of legs are brown and yellow, longer and stouter than the others, with long brown hairs. The remaining legs are yellow with darker patches and have white leg hairs. All the spider's leg spines are dark brown.

The spider has distinctive copulatory organs. Its light brown pedipalps, covered in white hairs, end with a small palpal tibia that has a sharp curved spike, or tibial apophysis, on one side and a tuft of hair on the other. It has a rounded hairy cymbium that surrounds a bulgy palpal bulb. A relatively long straight embolus projects from the top of the haematodocha at the end of the palpal bulb. Compared to the related Rhene legitima, its embolus is straighter and there is no terminal tegular apophysis. It can also be confused with Rhene kenyaensis but the lack of a coil in the spider's embolus helps distinguish it.

The female has a cephalothorax length between 1.4 and 1.5 mm (0.06 and 0.06 in) and a width of between 1.5 and 1.7 mm (0.06 and 0.07 in). It is similar to the male, although it is lighter. The female's abdomen is between 1.7 and 1.8 mm (0.07 and 0.07 in) in length and between 1.4 and 1.7 mm (0.06 and 0.07 in) in width. It is whitish-silver with silver spots of internal guanine crystals visible on the top as well. There is a vague darker area in the middle of its abdomen and many tufts of white hairs towards the rear of the spider. Unlike the male's, the female's legs are mainly yellow, only the foremost pair having black marks on some of the sections. There are tufts of white hairs on the first patella and tibia. One specimen of the female was much lighter than the others.

The female's epigyne, the external visible part of its copulatory organs, has a oval depression in the middle and a notched border towards the back near the epigastric furrow. There is a broad pocket and two small oval depressions near the front of the epigyne. Its copulatory openings are hidden in two entrance cavities that shows strong evidence of sclerotization. They lead to two looping insemination ducts that lead to bean-shaped spermathecae, or receptacles. The accessory glands are found near the start of the insemination ducts, in entrance cavities. Its epigyne is similar to the related Rhene facilis but the spider is generally hairier and so is the two still can be distinguished.

== Distribution and habitat ==
Unlike other Dendryphantine spiders that are predominantly found in the Americas, Rhene spiders live in Africa and Eurasia. Rhene plumata is endemic to Mozambique. It was first identified near Marracuene living in shrubs in a forest near a river.
