= Rhene amanzi =

Scientific classification
- Kingdom: Animalia
- Phylum: Arthropoda
- Subphylum: Chelicerata
- Class: Arachnida
- Order: Araneae
- Infraorder: Araneomorphae
- Family: Salticidae
- Genus: Rhene
- Species: R. amanzi

Binomial name
- Rhene amanzi Wesołowska & Haddad, 2013

Species of spider

Rhene amanzi is a species of jumping spider in the genus Rhene. The male was first identified in 2013 and the female in 2018. The species is named after the Amanzi Private Game Reserve in Free State, South Africa, which is the only place that it has been found. It is dark brown, almost black, and small, although the female is larger than the male. The upper part of the cephalothorax, or carapace, is trapezoid and dominated by a large trapezoid eye field. Its front legs are fatter than the others. Its copulatory organs are distinctive. It differs from other spiders in the genus by the large triangular embolus found on the male and the shallow notch in the female's epigyne. The male also has a very small palpal tibia that has a sharp curved spike, or tibial apophysis, which ends in a point.

== Etymology and taxonomy ==
Rhene amanzi is a species of jumping spider, a member of the family Salticidae, that was first described by Wanda Wesołowska and Charles Haddad in 2013. It is one of over 500 different species identified by Wesołowska in her career, making her the most prolific author in the discipline since Eugène Simon. They allocated it to the genus Rhene, which is named after the Greek female name shared by mythological figures. The species is named after the Amanzi Private Game Reserve, where the first example was collected.

First circumscribed in 1869 by Tamerlan Thorell, the genus Rhene is a part of the subtribe Dendryphantina in the tribe Dendryphantini. Wayne Maddison allocated the tribe to the subclade Simonida in the clade Saltafresia in the clade Salticoida. It is related to the genera Dendryphantes and Macaroeris. The genus is also similar to Homalattus. In 2017, Jerzy Prószyński designated it a member of a group of genera named Dendryphantines after the genus Dendryphantes. He also noted that it is similar to the genera related to Simaetha, a group he named Simaethines, particularly in the shape of spider's body. The genus is known for its good eyesight and its high level of spatial awareness, which is likely to show that it is recent in evolutionary terms.

== Description ==
Like many in the genus, Rhene amanzi resembles a beetle. The spider was first identified in 2013, with initially only the male described by Wesołowska and Haddad. The female was first described in 2018 by the same team. The spider is small, flat, robust and a very dark brown, almost black, in colour. The spider's body is divided into two main parts: a cephalothorax and an abdomen. The male's carapace, the hard upper part of the cephalothorax, is trapezoid in shape and has a length of 1.5 mm (0.06 in) and width of 1.9 mm (0.07 in). The spider's eye field is also trapezoid, and unusually large, dominating the majority of the upper surface. Its abdomen is very flat and 1.7 mm (0.07 in) long and 1.9 mm (0.07 in) wide. It is fringed with dense hairs. The spider has dark pedipalps and dark brown legs, the front legs fatter than the rest.

The female is similar to the related Rhene timidus, but is smaller, despite being larger than the male. The cephalothorax has a length of 1.3 mm (0.05 in) and width of 1.5 mm (0.06 in), while the abdomen is 2.2 mm (0.09 in) long and 1.9 mm (0.07 in) wide. Externally, it is generally similar to the male. The carapace is dark, but has some very short white hairs on the edges. The abdomen also has some short dark hairs. It is blackish on the top and brown underneath. The spinnerets are also dark.

The spider has distinctive copulatory organs. The male has a rounded cymbium that surrounds a bulgy palpal bulb. A large triangular embolus, the shape of which distinguishes the spider from others in the genus, emanates from the top. There is a very small palpal tibia that has a sharp curved spike, or tibial apophysis, which ends in a point. It is similar externally to Dendryphantes neethlingi, differing in the way that the embolus curves and its longer tibial apophysis.

The female has a round epigyne with a small notch at the end. The copulatory openings are at the front. They lead to two broad insemination ducts, via atria that are used as part of the insemination process, that loop around before entering the spermathecae, or receptacles. Both the spermathecae and the lips of the atria have some sclerotin. There are also large accessory glands. The epigyne differs from Rhene timidus in details, including having a shallower notch.

== Distribution ==
Although Dendryphantine spiders a predominantly found in the Americas, Rhene spiders live in Africa and Eurasia. Rhene amanzi is endemic to South Africa. It has only been identified in the Amanzi Private Game Reserve near Brandfort in Free State. Unusually for the genus, it has been found in grasslands as well as in wooded areas.
