= Rhene timidus =

Scientific classification
- Kingdom: Animalia
- Phylum: Arthropoda
- Subphylum: Chelicerata
- Class: Arachnida
- Order: Araneae
- Infraorder: Araneomorphae
- Family: Salticidae
- Genus: Rhene
- Species: R. timidus

Binomial name
- Rhene timidus Wesołowska & Haddad, 2013

Species of jumping spider

Rhene timidus is a species of jumping spider that is endemic to South Africa. A member of the genus Rhene, the female was first described in 2013 while the male has not been identified. It lives in savanna, forests and bushes in gardens. It is typically 5.9 mm (0.23 in) long and generally brown. The top of its abdomen is a lighter, brownish-fawn, and its spinnerets are dark. Its front legs are fatter than the others. Its copulatory organs are distinctive with spiralling ridges around its copulatory openings and broader seminal ducts than other Rhene spiders from Africa. Its epigyne, the external visible part of its copulatory organs, have delicate sclerotization, particularly the collars that surround its copulatory openings.

== Etymology and taxonomy ==
Rhene timidus is a species of jumping spider, a member of the family Salticidae, that was first described by Wanda Wesołowska and Charles Haddad in 2013. It is one of over 500 different species identified by Wesołowska in her career, making her the most prolific author in the discipline since Eugène Simon. They allocated it to the genus Rhene, which is named after the Greek female name shared by mythological figures. The specific name is the Latin word timidus, which can be translated 'cautious'.

First circumscribed in 1869 by Tamerlan Thorell, the genus Rhene is a part of the subtribe Dendryphantina in the tribe Dendryphantini. Wayne Maddison allocated the tribe to the subclade Simonida in the clade Saltafresia in the clade Salticoida. It is related to the genera Dendryphantes and Macaroeris. The genus is also similar to Homalattus. In 2017, Jerzy Prószyński designated it a member of a group of genera named Dendryphantines after the genus Dendryphantes. He also noted that it is similar to the genera a group of genera he named Simaethines, that is related to Simaetha, particularly in the shape of spider's body. The genus is known for its good eyesight and its high level of spatial awareness, which is likely to show that it is recent in evolutionary terms.

== Description ==
Like many in the genus, Rhene timidus resembles a beetle. Its shape is typical for the genus. It is particularly similar to the related Rhene facilis, but is larger. The spider is flat and robust. The spider's body is divided into two main parts: a cephalothorax and an abdomen. The male's carapace, the hard upper part of the cephalothorax, is very wide and has a length of 2.4 mm (0.09 in) and width of 2.5 mm (0.10 in). The spider's eye field is trapezoid, and unusually large. The remainder of the carapace is brown and covered in whitish hairs. There are black rings around its eyes. The part of the spiders face known as its clypeus is very low and dark. The underside of its cephalothorax, its sternum, is brown. Its mouthparts, labium and maxillae, are also brown while Its chelicerae show a single tooth.

Its abdomen measures 3.5 mm (0.14 in) long and 2.8 mm (0.11 in) wide. It is brown underneath but its upper side is brownish-fawn, lighter than its carapace. Its spinnerets are dark. It has brown legs, the front legs fatter than the rest, with whitish hairs. Some of the segments have black segments while others have long black hairs or spines. The female has a rounded epigyne, the external visible part of its copulatory organs that has a ridge to the rear. This is a deeper ridge than the related Rhene amanzi. It has distinctive spiralling ridges around its copulatory openings and broader seminal ducts than other members of the genus from Africa. The ducts lead to relatively large bean-like spermathecae, or receptacles. The epigyne has delicate sclerotization, the source of the specific name. Unlike the related Rhene ferkensis, the sclerotization includes all the ridges that surround the copulatory openings. Compared to the other spider, it also has longer seminal ducts.

== Distribution and habitat ==
Although Dendryphantine spiders a predominantly found in the Americas, Rhene spiders live in Africa and Eurasia. Rhene timidus is endemic to South Africa. It was first found in Amathole Mountains, Eastern Cape but it was also found in KwaZulu-Natal. It was initially seen living in broadleaf shrubs in a domestic garden. In the wild, it lives in savanna and forests.
