= Rhene legitima =

Scientific classification
- Kingdom: Animalia
- Phylum: Arthropoda
- Subphylum: Chelicerata
- Class: Arachnida
- Order: Araneae
- Infraorder: Araneomorphae
- Family: Salticidae
- Genus: Rhene
- Species: R. legitima

Binomial name
- Rhene legitima Wesołowska & Haddad, 2018

Species of jumping spider

Rhene legitima is a species of jumping spider that lives in South Africa, A member of the genus Rhene, it is a small spider that resembles a beetle, measuring typically 2.9 mm (0.11 in) in total length. The male has a dark brown carapace, the hard upper part of its forward section, and lighter brown sternum underneath while its rear section, its abdomen, is covered in patches of translucent guanine crystals. It has yellow legs. Similar to the related Rhene plumata, it has a fluffy appearance due to a covering of dense light hairs which means that it can mimic insects like green lacewings and scale insects. The male, first described in 2018, has a very short stumpy embolus that is detached from the membranous part of its copulatory organs. The female has not been described.

== Etymology and taxonomy ==
Rhene legitima is a species of jumping spider, a member of the family Salticidae, that was first described by the arachnologists Wanda Wesołowska and Charles R. Haddad in 2018. It is one of over 500 different species identified by Wesołowska in her career. She allocated it to the genus Rhene, which is named after the Greek female name shared by some mythological figures. Its specific name is related to the Latin word legitimus, which can be translated 'proper'. The holotype is stored in the National Collection of Arachnida at the Plant Protection Research Institute in Pretoria.

First circumscribed in 1869 by Tamerlan Thorell, the genus Rhene is a part of the subtribe Dendryphantina in the tribe Dendryphantini. Wayne Maddison allocated the tribe to the subclade Simonida in the clade Saltafresia in the clade Salticoida. It is related to the genera Dendryphantes and Macaroeris. The genus is also similar to Homalattus. In 2017, Jerzy Prószyński designated it a member of a group of genera named Dendryphantines after the genus Dendryphantes. He also noted that it is similar to the genera related to Simaetha, a group he named Simaethines, particularly in the shape of spider's body. The genus is known for its good eyesight and its high level of spatial awareness, which is likely to show that it is recent in evolutionary terms.

== Description ==
Spiders of the genus Rhene resemble a beetle. Typically shaped for the genus, Rhene legitima is small, flat and robust. Like the related Rhene plumata, it is covered in dense white hairs. The fluffy appearance of the spider means that it can mimic insects like green lacewings and scale insects.

The spider's body is divided into two main parts: a cephalothorax and an abdomen. The male's cephalothorax is typically 1.4 mm (0.06 in) long and 1.5 mm (0.06 in) wide. Its carapace, the hard upper part of the cephalothorax, is a dark brown trapezium, interspersed with brown bristles. The spider's eye field is large and have black areas around the eyes themselves. The underside of its carapace, known as its sternum, is brown. There are white hairs on its brown chelicerae, which have a single visible tooth. Its remaining mouthparts, including its labium and maxillae, are a lighter brown.

The male's heart-shaped abdomen is 1.5 mm long and 1.4 wide and overlaps with the carapace. It is yellowish on its upper surface; both the top and bottom have many silver patches made of translucent guanine crystals. Its spinnerets and legs are yellow. The first pair of legs are slightly darker than the rest and have brown dots and long dense hairs.

The spider has distinctive copulatory organs. Its dark, hairy pedipalps ends with a small palpal tibia that has a long spike, or tibial apophysis, that ends with a curved point. It has a rounded cymbium that surrounds a palpal bulb that has a forked bulge. A very short stumpy embolus emanates from the top and sits in an indentation in the cymbium. Unlike the related Rhene punctatus, its embolus is attached to the membranous outside of bulb. The female has not been described.

== Distribution and habitat ==
Although Dendryphantine spiders a predominantly found in the Americas, Rhene spiders live in Africa and Eurasia. Rhene legitima is endemic to South Africa. It has only been identified in the Mount Coke State Forest in East Cape. It lives in forests.
