= Rhene facilis =

Scientific classification
- Kingdom: Animalia
- Phylum: Arthropoda
- Subphylum: Chelicerata
- Class: Arachnida
- Order: Araneae
- Infraorder: Araneomorphae
- Family: Salticidae
- Genus: Rhene
- Species: R. facilis

Binomial name
- Rhene facilis Wesołowska & Russell-Smith, 2000

Species of jumping spider

Rhene facilis is a species of jumping spider in the genus Rhene that lives in the forests of Tanzania and South Africa. It is a small flattened spider that has a trapezoid carapace that is between 1.6 and 2.1 mm (0.06 and 0.08 in) and an elongated abdomen between 2.2 and 2.5 mm (0.09 and 0.10 in) long. The male's carapace is black while the female's is reddish-brown. It has a dark clypeus and a pitted eye field, the last line of eyes mounted of tubercles. Its front legs are different to the others, the male's being thicker and longer and the female's orange-brown rather than black. The male has a distinctive pattern on its upper surfaces consisting of a white stripe running down from front to back. The female has unusual copulatory organs with a small epigyne and S-shaped copulatory openings. The male was first identified in 2000 and the female in 2013.

== Etymology and taxonomy ==
Rhene facilis is a species of jumping spider, a member of the family Salticidae. The spider was first described in 2000, with initially only the male described by arachnologists Wanda Wesołowska and Anthony Russell-Smith in 2000. The female was first subsequently described in 2013 by Wesołowska and Charles Haddad. They allocated it to the genus Rhene, which is named after the Greek female name shared by mythological figures. The specific name "facilis" is derived from a Latin word that can be translated "easy".

First circumscribed in 1869 by Tamerlan Thorell, the genus Rhene is a part of the subtribe Dendryphantina in the tribe Dendryphantini. Wayne Maddison allocated the tribe to the subclade Simonida in the clade Saltafresia in the clade Salticoida. It is related to the genera Dendryphantes and Macaroeris. The genus is also similar to Homalattus. In 2017, Jerzy Prószyński designated it a member of a group of genera named Dendryphantines after the genus Dendryphantes. He also noted that it is similar to the genera related to Simaetha, a group he named Simaethines, particularly in the shape of spider's body. The genus is known for its good eyesight and its high level of spatial awareness, which is likely to show that it is recent in evolutionary terms.

== Description ==
Like many in the genus, Rhene facilis resembles a beetle. It is a small, robust and flattened spider. The spider's body is divided into two main parts: a cephalothorax and an abdomen. The male's carapace, the hard upper part of the cephalothorax, is a black or extremely dark brown trapezoid, marked with a white stripe near the back, and has a scattering of colourless hairs on it. It has a length between 1.9 and 2.1 mm (0.07 and 0.08 in) and width of between 1.5 and 2 mm (0.06 and 0.08 in). The spider's pitted eye field is large and trapezoid, divided from the rest of the carapace by a line of white hairs. The last line of eyes is mounted of tubercles. The underside of the cephalothorax, or sternum, is brown.

The male spider's face, known as the clypeus, is dark and low. Its chelicerae is dark brown with a single tooth at the back and two at the front. The spider's remaining mouthparts, including its labium and maxillae are brownish with a pale line along their tips. Its abdomen is elongated, between 2.2 and 2.3 mm (0.09 and 0.09 in) long and between 1.8 and 1.9 mm (0.07 and 0.07 in) wide. Its upper side is black with a scutum on the top and a white stripe running down from front to back. Its under side is lighter and either very dark brown or brownish-grey. Its spinnerets are dark brown. The spider's legs are dark brown; its front legs are longer and stouter than the others and are marked with dense long black hairs.

Rhene facilis has distinctive copulatory organs. Its pedipalps are brown or dark brown. Its cymbium is a smooth and larger than its tegulum. There is a meandering spermophore inside the tegulum and a thin and slightly curved embolus projecting from the top. The palpal tibia has a hooked projection, called a tibial apophysis. The male is distinguished from other Rhene spiders by the distinctive white pattern on its surface.

The female has a reddish-brown carapace that is covered in colourless hairs. It typically has a length of 1.6 mm (0.06 in) and width of 1.5 mm. Its eye field is black and pitted. Its sternum is pale brown, as are its mouthparts. Its abdomen is an oval that is more elongated than the male, measuring typically 2.5 mm (0.10 in) long and 1.5 mm wide. It has a scutum and dark spinnerets like the male. Its front legs are orange-brown; the remainder are black. It is smaller than the otherwise similar Rhene timidus.

The female spider has a very small epigyne with two copulatory openings that show slight evidence of sclerotization. It has a notch at the back and a broad arch at the front. There are two S-shaped copulatory openings that lead via wide insemination ducts to bean-shaped spermathecae, or receptacles and large accessory glands.

== Distribution and habitat ==
Although Dendryphantine spiders a predominantly found in the Americas, Rhene spiders live in Africa and Eurasia. Rhene facilis has been seen in South Africa and Tanzania. In Tanzania, it has been observed in the Mkomazi National Park. It lives amongst long grass found in the clearing of dry forests of Spirostachys trees and in the fogging canopy of trees like Albizia adianthifolia, Breonadia salicina, Kigelia africana and Trichilia dregeana.
