= Simaetha reducta =

Scientific classification
- Kingdom: Animalia
- Phylum: Arthropoda
- Subphylum: Chelicerata
- Class: Arachnida
- Order: Araneae
- Infraorder: Araneomorphae
- Family: Salticidae
- Genus: Simaetha
- Species: S. reducta

Binomial name
- Simaetha reducta (Karsch, 1892)

Synonyms
- Homalattus reductus Karsch, 1892

Species of spider

Simaetha reducta is a species of spider of the genus Simaetha. It is endemic to Sri Lanka.
