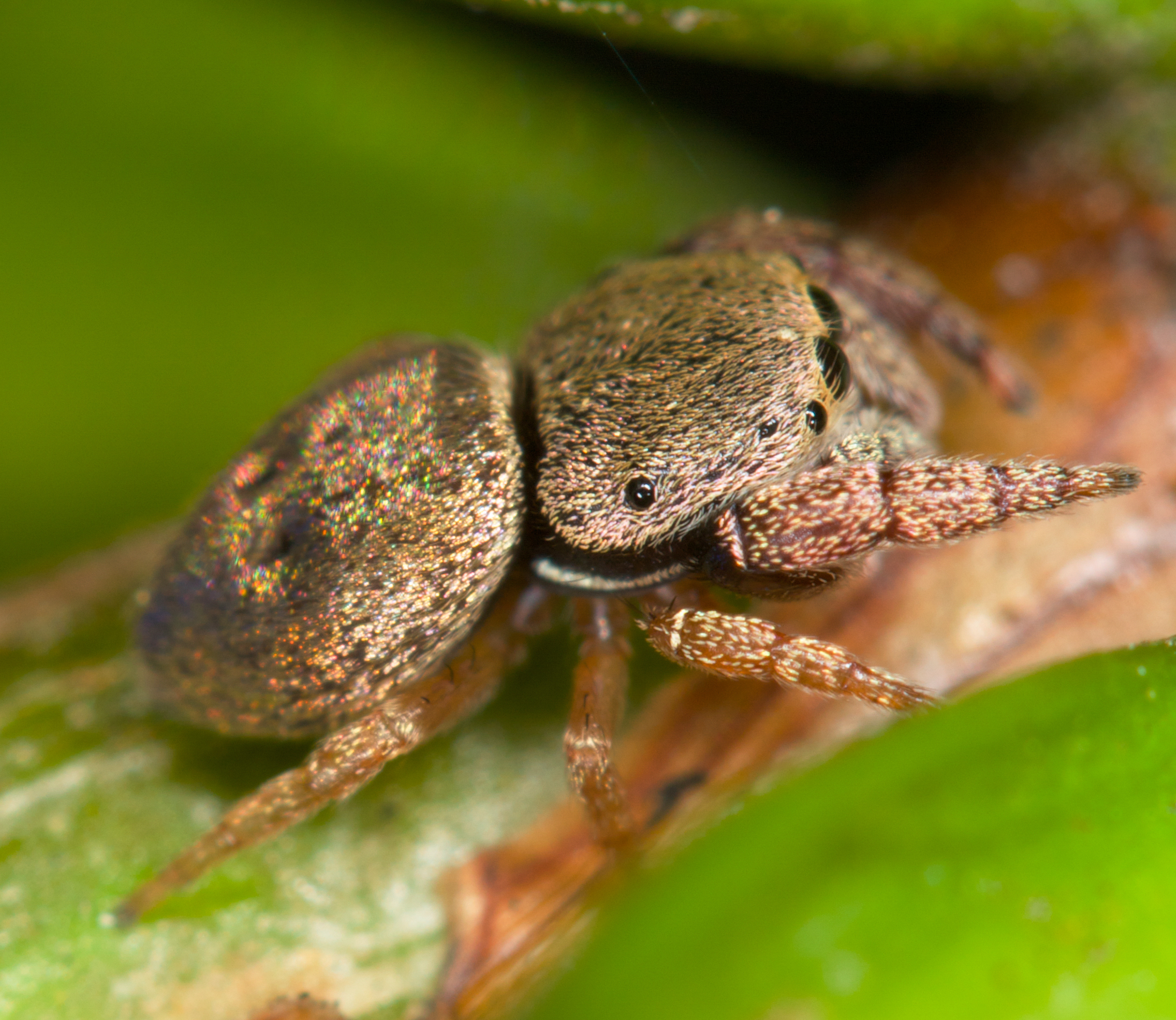
- Simaethula sp.

Scientific classification
- Kingdom: Animalia
- Phylum: Arthropoda
- Subphylum: Chelicerata
- Class: Arachnida
- Order: Araneae
- Infraorder: Araneomorphae
- Family: Salticidae
- Subfamily: Salticinae
- Genus: Simaethula; Simon, 1902

Type species
- S. janthina Simon, 1902

Species
- 7, see text

= Simaethula =

Genus of spiders

Simaethula is a genus of Australian jumping spiders that was first described by Eugène Louis Simon in 1902. The name is an alteration of Simaetha, a related genus.

== Species ==
As of August 2019 it contains seven species, found only in Australia:

- Simaethula aurata (L. Koch, 1879) – Australia (Queensland)
- Simaethula auronitens (L. Koch, 1879) – Australia (Queensland, New South Wales)
- Simaethula chalcops Simon, 1909 – Australia (Western Australia)
- Simaethula janthina Simon, 1902 (type) – Australia (Queensland)
- Simaethula mutica Szombathy, 1915 – Australia
- Simaethula opulenta (L. Koch, 1879) – Australia (Queensland, New South Wales)
- Simaethula violacea (L. Koch, 1879) – Australia (Queensland)
