= Dendryphantes matumi =

Matumi Dendryphantes Jumping Spider

Scientific classification
- Kingdom: Animalia
- Phylum: Arthropoda
- Subphylum: Chelicerata
- Class: Arachnida
- Order: Araneae
- Infraorder: Araneomorphae
- Family: Salticidae
- Genus: Dendryphantes
- Species: D. matumi

Binomial name
- Dendryphantes matumi Haddad & Wesołowska, 2013

Species of jumping spider

Dendryphantes matumi is a species of jumping spider in the family Salticidae. It is endemic to South Africa and is commonly known as the Matumi Dendryphantes jumping spider.

== Distribution ==
Dendryphantes matumi is found only in South Africa, where it is known exclusively from two sites in iSimangaliso Wetland Park (KwaZulu-Natal province).

== Habitat and ecology ==
Dendryphantes matumi inhabits subtropical coastal forests in the Indian Ocean Coastal Belt Biome at altitudes ranging from 11 to 22 m. The species lives in forest canopies and has been collected by fogging.

== Conservation ==
Dendryphantes matumi is listed as Data Deficient by the South African National Biodiversity Institute. The species has a very restricted range, currently known only from two sites in iSimangaliso Wetland Park. More canopy sampling is needed to determine the species' full distribution.

== Etymology ==
The species is named after the matumi tree (Breonadia salicina).

== Taxonomy ==
Dendryphantes matumi was originally described by Charles Haddad and Wanda Wesołowska in 2013 from the Crocodile Centre in iSimangaliso Wetland Park. Both sexes are known.
