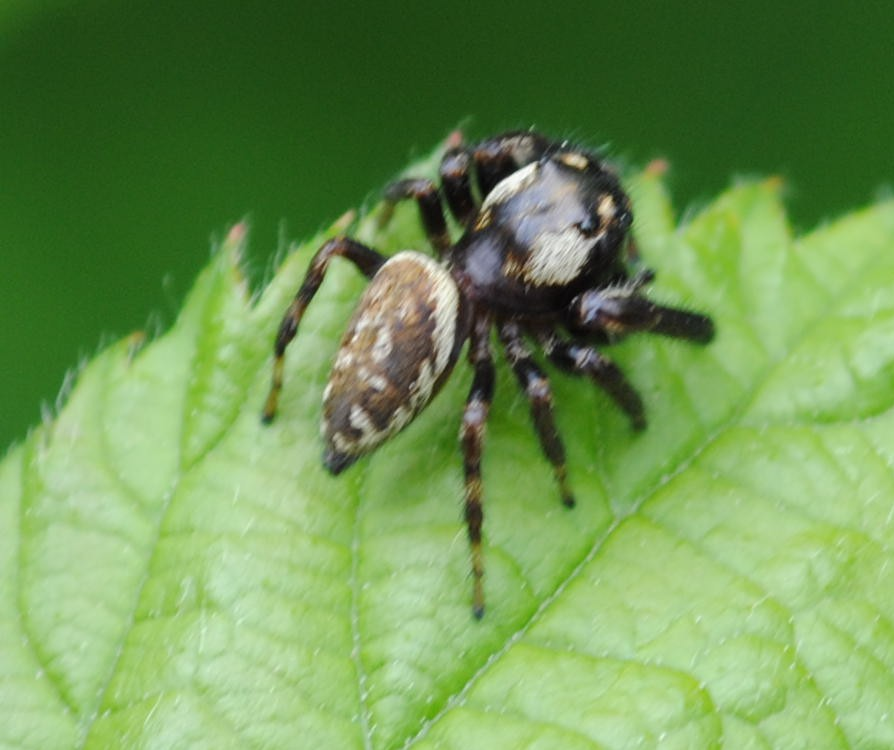
- male M. nidicolens from Cologne, Germany (2012)

Scientific classification
- Kingdom: Animalia
- Phylum: Arthropoda
- Subphylum: Chelicerata
- Class: Arachnida
- Order: Araneae
- Infraorder: Araneomorphae
- Family: Salticidae
- Genus: Macaroeris
- Species: M. nidicolens

Binomial name
- Macaroeris nidicolens (Walckenaer, 1802)

Synonyms
- Aranea nidicolens Attus nidicolens Dendryphantes nebulosus Salticus vigilans Marpissa nardoi Attus castaneus Attus phrygianus Attus nitelinus Attus luridatus Marpessa ornata Dendryphantes nidicolens Euophrys luridata Marpissa grantii Marpissa ornata Dendryphantes grantii Dendryphantes nitelinus Dendryphantes nidicolioides Dendryphantes nidicolens Dendryphantes musae Dendryphantes granti Eris nidicolens Dendryphantes huberi

= Macaroeris nidicolens =

Species of spider

Macaroeris nidicolens is a species of jumping spider that occurs from Europe to Central Asia.

== Description ==
Males reach a body length of 4–6 mm (0.16–0.24 in), females of 5–7 mm (0.20–0.28 in).

The male has reddish brown hairs surrounding its frontal eyes. Two white stripes reach along the prosoma towards the opisthosoma (abdomen). Several white spots cover the top of the prosoma, one bigger each behind the posterior lateral eyes. A white arch covers the anterior end of the abdomen, with pairs of white specks further down, four of which form a slanted cross near the posterior end.

The female is colored much lighter than the male. A white triangle sits in the middle of the prosoma, while the abdomen matches the male's.

Color and patterning can vary strongly in this species. Both sexes have black, curves tufts of hair on the sides behind the anterior lateral eyes.

== Habitat ==
Macaroeris nidicolens prefers bushes in warm, dry, sunny to half-shaded areas.

== Distribution ==
The species is found from Europe to Central Asia. In Germany it was found first in 1995 (Cologne), and seems to expand its area further.

== Name ==
The species name is derived from Neo-Latin, and means "inhabiting a nest". Walckenaer discovered the spider enclosed in a silk nest, along with a large number of its young.

== External resources ==
- Pictures and diagnostic drawings of male and female M. nidicolens
