= Dendryphantes mordax =

- female
- male

Scientific classification
- Kingdom: Animalia
- Phylum: Arthropoda
- Subphylum: Chelicerata
- Class: Arachnida
- Order: Araneae
- Infraorder: Araneomorphae
- Family: Salticidae
- Genus: Dendryphantes
- Species: D. mordax

Binomial name
- Dendryphantes mordax (C. L. Koch, 1846)

Synonyms
- Hyllus mordax C. L. Koch, 1846; Euophrys jucunda C. L. Koch, 1846; Attus iricolor Nicolet, 1849; Attus scalaris Nicolet, 1849; Attus superbus Nicolet, 1849; Attus zonarius Nicolet, 1849; Freya jucunda C. L. Koch, 1850; Phiale jucunda Simon, 1903

Species of spider

Dendryphantes mordax is a species of jumping spider in the family Salticidae. It is found in Chile, Argentina, and Uruguay.

The species name mordax is Latin meaning "biting" or "snapping," referring to the spider's predatory nature.

== Taxonomy ==
The species was first described by Carl Ludwig Koch in 1846 as Hyllus mordax. The complex taxonomic history of this species involves multiple synonymizations. In 1979, María Elena Galiano synonymized Phiale jucunda with D. mordax. Later, Ruiz and Brescovit (2008) removed several names from nomen dubium status and synonymized them with D. mordax, including Salticus iricolor, S. scalaris, S. superbus, and S. zonarius, all originally described by Nicolet in 1849 from Chilean material.

== Distribution ==
Dendryphantes mordax is distributed across southern South America, with confirmed records from Chile, Argentina, and Uruguay. In Chile, it appears to be relatively widespread, with specimens collected from locations including Pichidigua and Oncol Park.

== Habitat ==
The species has been collected from various habitats, including specimens found during bark stripping activities, suggesting it may inhabit tree bark and similar microhabitats.

== Description ==
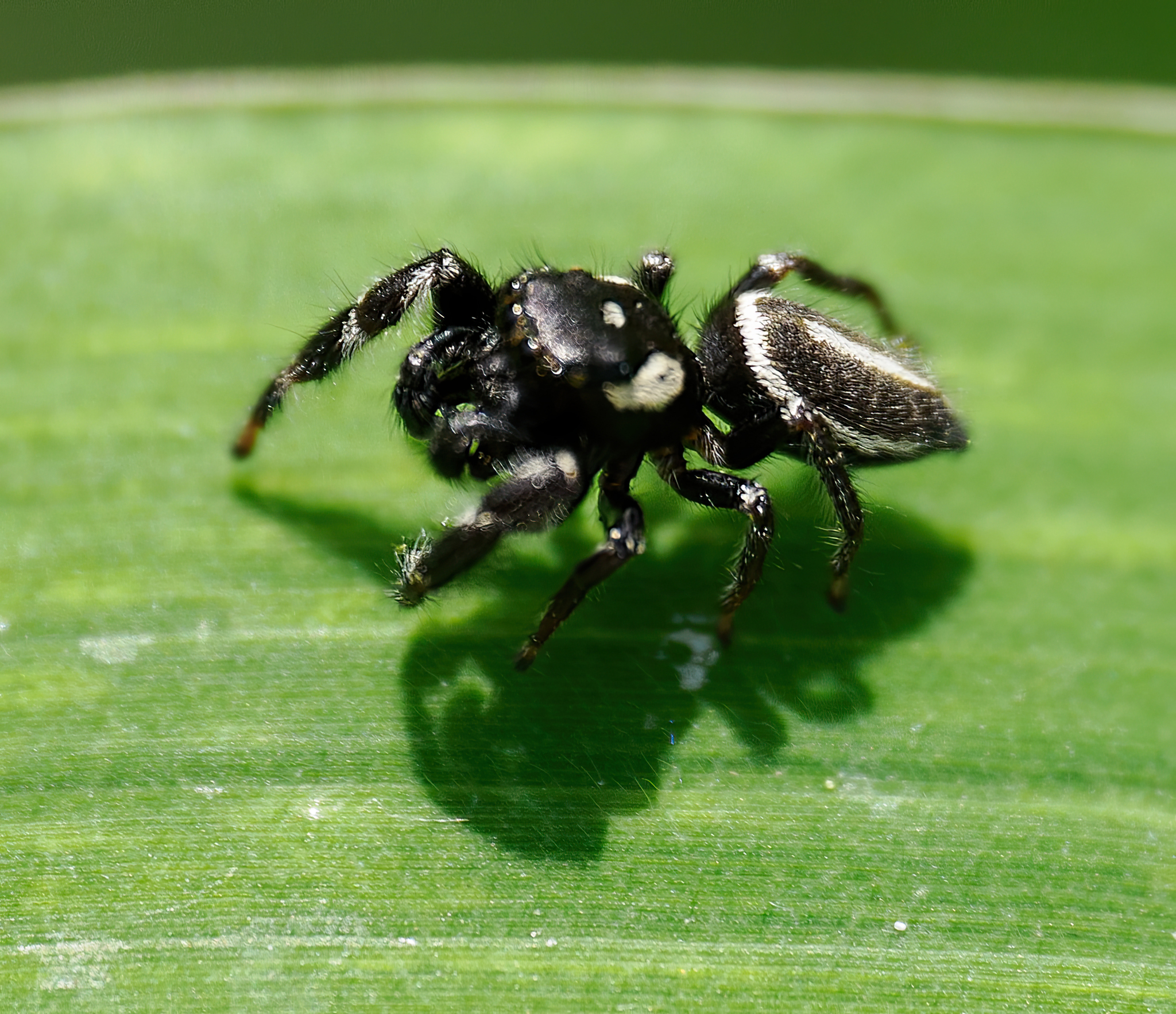
male from Argentina

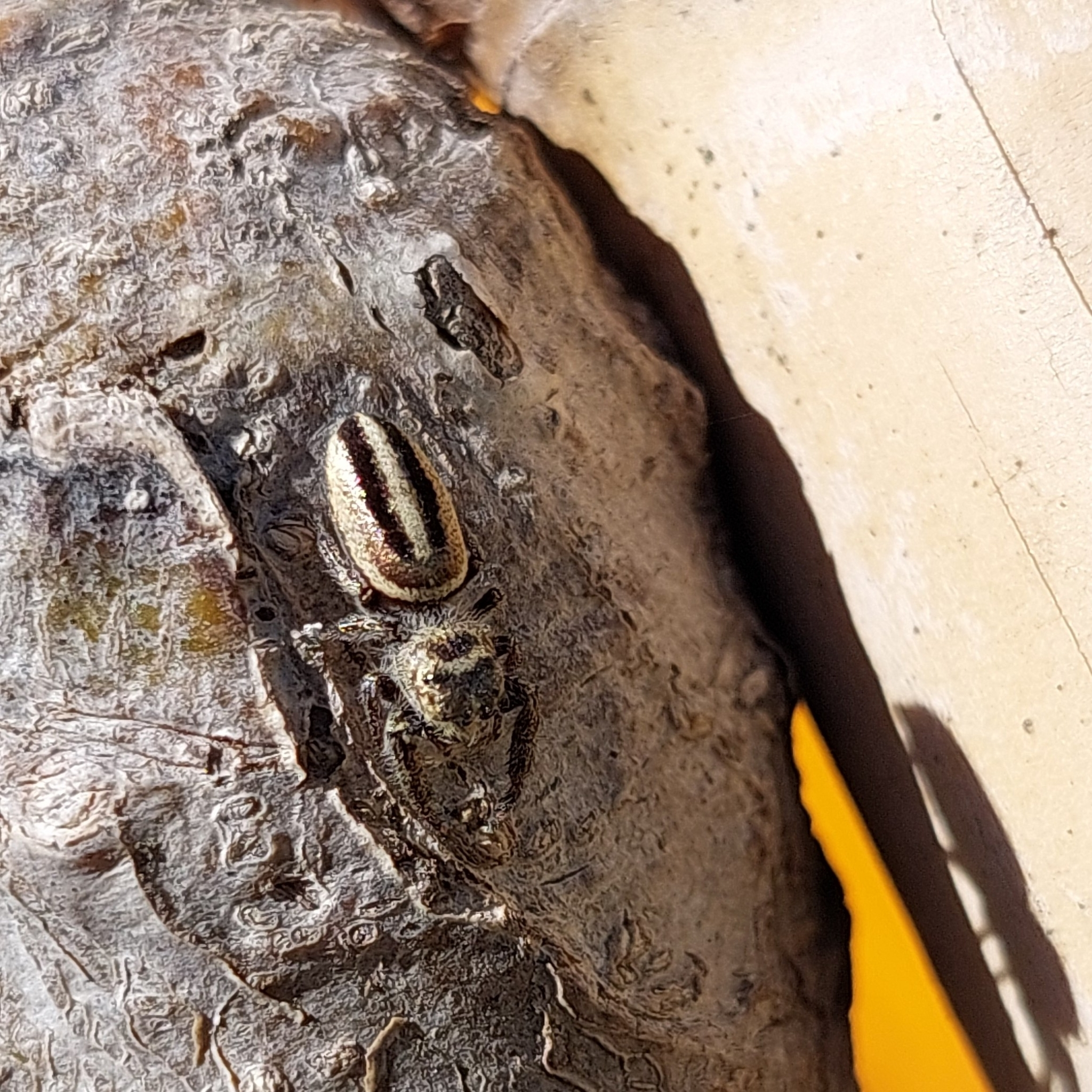
female from Argentina

The species exhibits pronounced sexual dimorphism typical of jumping spiders. The cephalothorax measures 2.60 mm in length in males and 2.93 mm in females.

Females are generally larger than males and have similar overall coloration but lack the distinctive leg coloration seen in males. The female chelicerae bear two teeth on the front margin and one tooth on the rear margin.

Males have a dark reddish-brown cephalothorax with the head region appearing black. White stripes of feather-like hairs run along each side. The narrow clypeus bears a light brown fringe. The chelicerae are mid-brown with a deeply excavated groove. The front margin bears a low blunt bump near the base and two teeth, while the rear margin has a single robust tooth. The opisthosoma displays a distinctive pattern of light brown with a thick dark brown median stripe that branches into four large lateral projections on each side. Broad stripes of white feather-like hairs run down the center and sides of the abdomen, bordered by golden reflective scales. The first leg is reddish-brown with a darker tip and yellow tarsus, while other legs are light brown with dark brown markings at the tips of each segment.
