= Dendryphantes acutus =

Lesotho Dendryphantes Jumping Spider

Scientific classification
- Kingdom: Animalia
- Phylum: Arthropoda
- Subphylum: Chelicerata
- Class: Arachnida
- Order: Araneae
- Infraorder: Araneomorphae
- Family: Salticidae
- Genus: Dendryphantes
- Species: D. acutus

Binomial name
- Dendryphantes acutus Wesołowska & Haddad, 2014

Species of jumping spider

Dendryphantes acutus is a species of jumping spider in the family Salticidae. It is endemic to southern Africa and is commonly known as the Lesotho Dendryphantes jumping spider.

== Distribution ==
Dendryphantes acutus is found in Lesotho and South Africa.

In South Africa, it is known from at Sterkfontein Dam Nature Reserve in Free State province.

== Habitat and ecology ==
Dendryphantes acutus inhabits alpine grasslands at altitudes ranging from 1,732 to 2,401 m. The species is collected near the ground, either under rocks or in low vegetation within the Grassland Biome.

== Conservation ==
Dendryphantes acutus is listed as Data Deficient by the South African National Biodiversity Institute. The species has a restricted range in South Africa with a very small extent of occurrence. More sampling is needed to determine the species' full distribution.

== Etymology ==
The species name acutus is Latin meaning "sharp" or "pointed".

== Taxonomy ==
Dendryphantes acutus was originally described by Wanda Wesołowska and Charles Haddad in 2014 from Letseng-la-Letsie in southern Lesotho. It was first recorded from South Africa in 2018. Both sexes are known.
