= Dendryphantes rafalskii =

Rafalski's Dendryphantes Jumping Spider

Scientific classification
- Kingdom: Animalia
- Phylum: Arthropoda
- Subphylum: Chelicerata
- Class: Arachnida
- Order: Araneae
- Infraorder: Araneomorphae
- Family: Salticidae
- Genus: Dendryphantes
- Species: D. rafalskii

Binomial name
- Dendryphantes rafalskii Wesołowska, 2000

Species of jumping spider

Dendryphantes rafalskii is a species of jumping spider in the family Salticidae. It is endemic to southern Africa and is commonly known as Rafalski's Dendryphantes jumping spider.

== Distribution ==
Dendryphantes rafalskii is found in South Africa and Zimbabwe.

In South Africa, it has been sampled from Free State and Gauteng provinces. Known locations include Bloemfontein National Botanical Gardens and Pretoria/Tshwane.

== Habitat and ecology ==
Dendryphantes rafalskii inhabits the Grassland Biome at altitudes ranging from 1,385 to 1,520 m. Specimens have been collected by beating the foliage of shrubs. Large numbers of juveniles with distinctive abdominal markings were also collected by fogging Olea europaea trees at the Free State National Botanical Gardens during February.

== Conservation ==
Dendryphantes rafalskii is listed as Least Concern by the South African National Biodiversity Institute due to its wide geographical range. There are no significant threats to the species.

== Etymology ==
The species is named after Polish arachnologist Jan Rafalski (1909-1995).

== Taxonomy ==
Dendryphantes rafalskii was originally described by Wanda Wesołowska in 2000 from Zimbabwe. Both sexes are known.
