= Dendryphantes secretus =

Scientific classification
- Kingdom: Animalia
- Phylum: Arthropoda
- Subphylum: Chelicerata
- Class: Arachnida
- Order: Araneae
- Infraorder: Araneomorphae
- Family: Salticidae
- Genus: Dendryphantes
- Species: D. secretus

Binomial name
- Dendryphantes secretus Wesołowska, 1995

Species of spider

Dendryphantes secretus is a jumping spider species in the genus Dendryphantes that lives in Kazakhstan. The male was first described by Wanda Wesołowska in 1995.
