= Dendryphantes quaesitus =

Scientific classification
- Kingdom: Animalia
- Phylum: Arthropoda
- Subphylum: Chelicerata
- Class: Arachnida
- Order: Araneae
- Infraorder: Araneomorphae
- Family: Salticidae
- Genus: Dendryphantes
- Species: D. quaesitus

Binomial name
- Dendryphantes quaesitus Wesołowska & van Harten, 1994

Species of spider

Dendryphantes quaesitus is a jumping spider species in the genus Dendryphantes that lives in Yemen.
