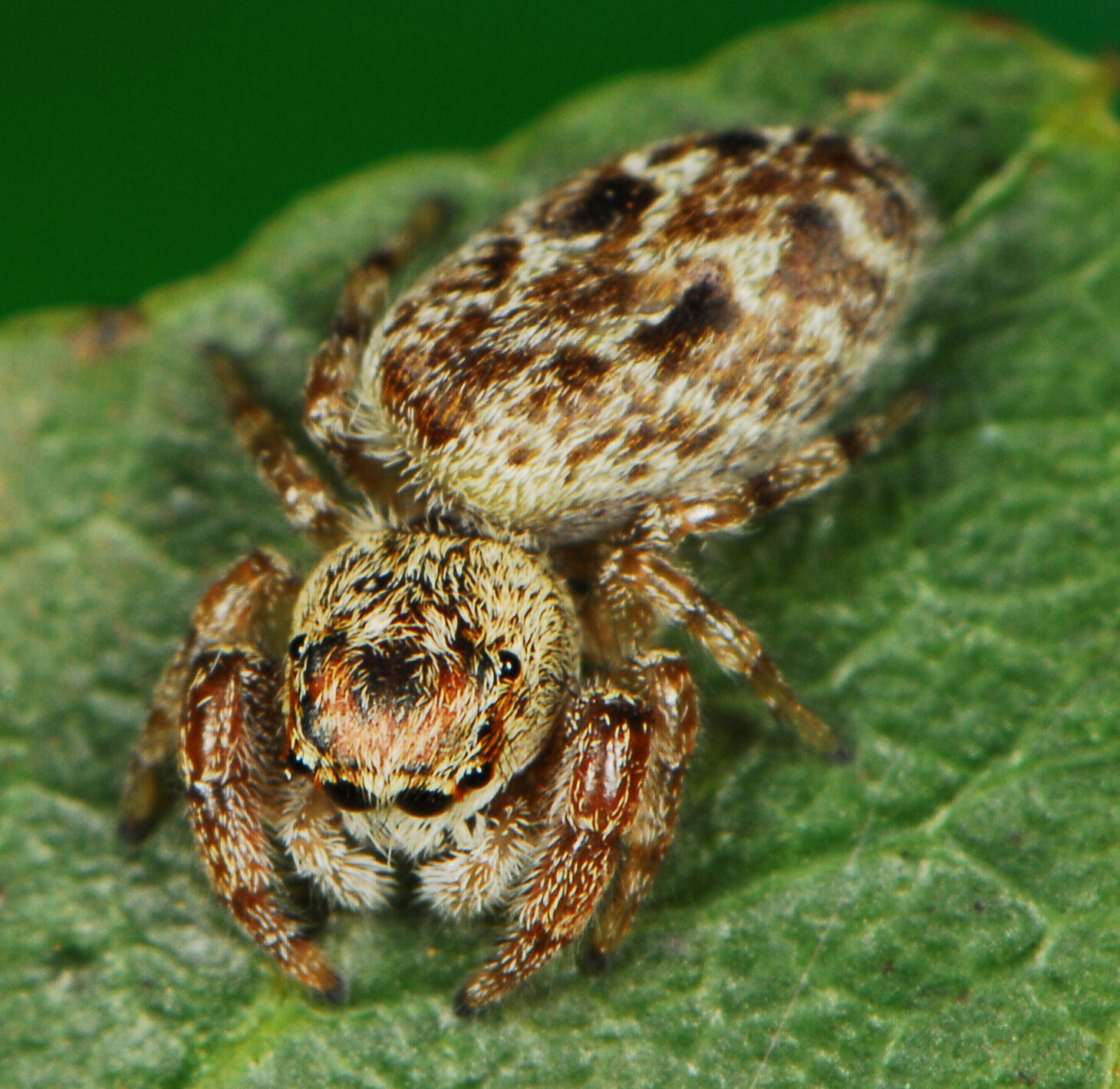
- female
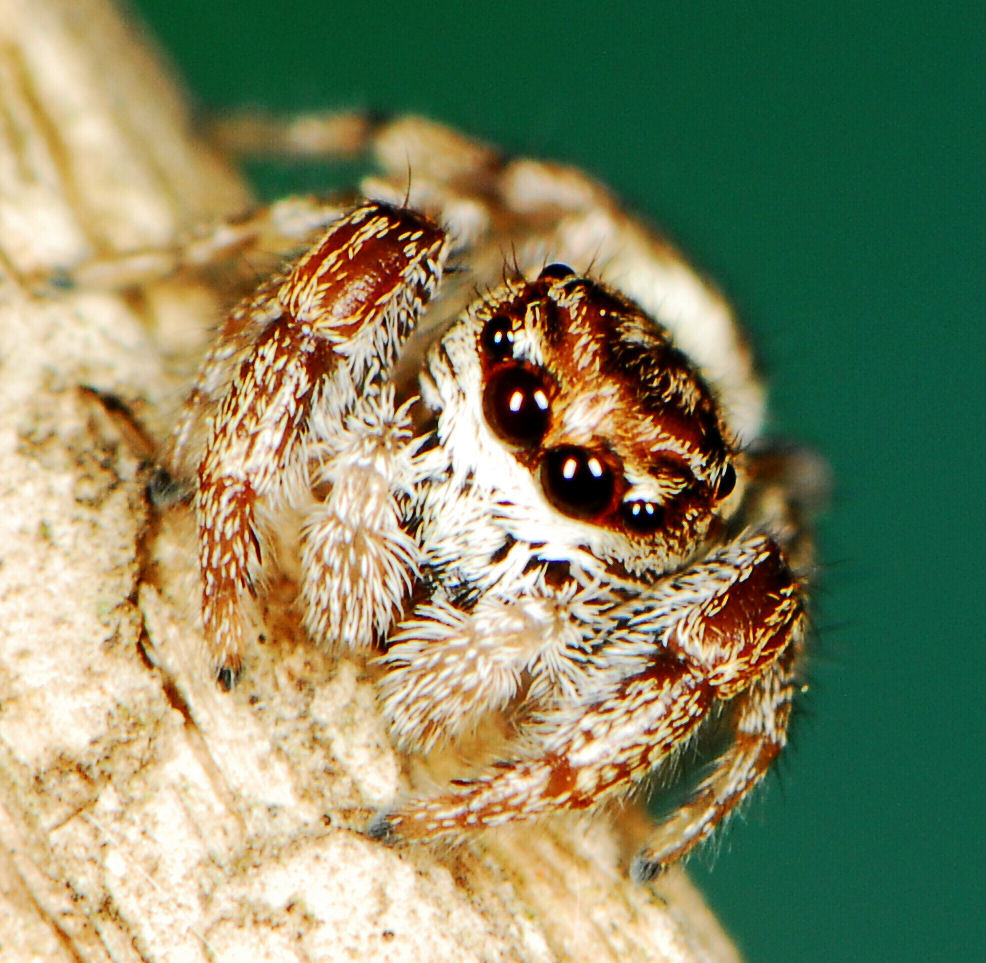
- female

Scientific classification
- Kingdom: Animalia
- Phylum: Arthropoda
- Subphylum: Chelicerata
- Class: Arachnida
- Order: Araneae
- Infraorder: Araneomorphae
- Family: Salticidae
- Genus: Dendryphantes
- Species: D. silvestris

Binomial name
- Dendryphantes silvestris Wesołowska & Haddad, 2013

= Dendryphantes silvestris =

Hogsback Dendryphantes Jumping Spider

Species of jumping spider

Dendryphantes silvestris is a species of jumping spider in the family Salticidae. It is endemic to South Africa and is commonly known as the Hogsback Dendryphantes jumping spider.

== Distribution ==
Dendryphantes silvestris is found only in South Africa, where it has been recorded from Eastern Cape, Gauteng, and KwaZulu-Natal. Notable locations include Hogsback in the Amatola Mountains, Katberg State Forest, Fort Fordyce Forest Reserve, Mkhuze Game Reserve, and iSimangaliso Wetland Park.

== Habitat and ecology ==
Dendryphantes silvestris inhabits the Indian Ocean Coastal Belt, Grassland, and Forest biomes at altitudes ranging from 21 to 2,826 m. The species has been collected from yellowwood trees and mixed tree canopies by fogging in indigenous Afromontane forests invaded by exotic species at Hogsback and undisturbed forest at Katberg. Single specimens were collected by beating shrubs in Afromontane forest and by fogging a tree in coastal forest.

== Description ==
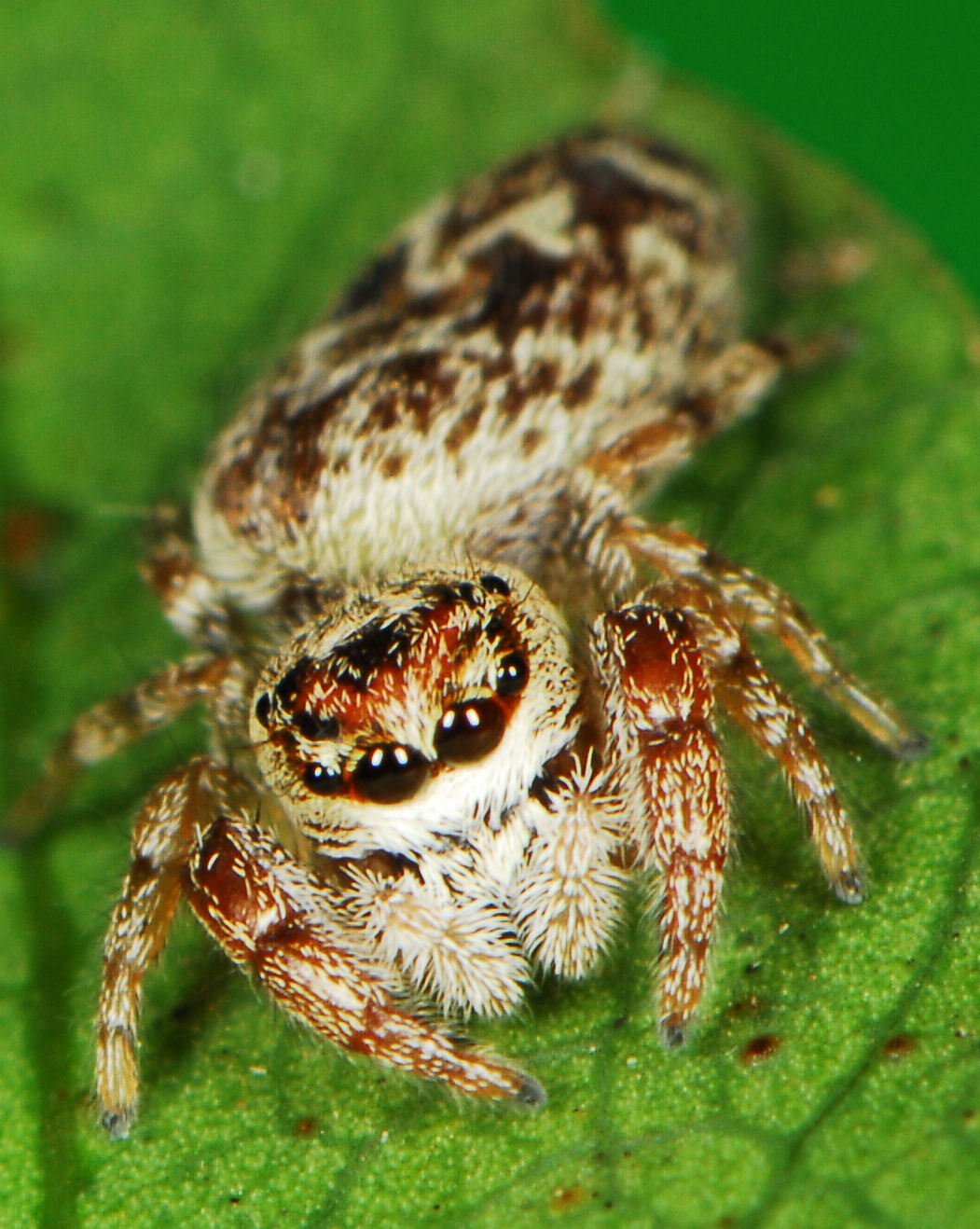
female

== Conservation ==
Dendryphantes silvestris is listed as Least Concern by the South African National Biodiversity Institute due to its wide geographical range. There are no significant threats to the species. It is protected in iSimangaliso Wetland Park, Fort Fordyce Forest Reserve, Mkhuze Game Reserve, and Katberg State Forest.

== Etymology ==
The species name silvestris is Latin meaning "of the forest", referring to its forest habitat.

== Taxonomy ==
Dendryphantes silvestris was originally described by Wanda Wesołowska and Charles R. Haddad in 2013 from Hogsback in the Eastern Cape. Both sexes are known.
