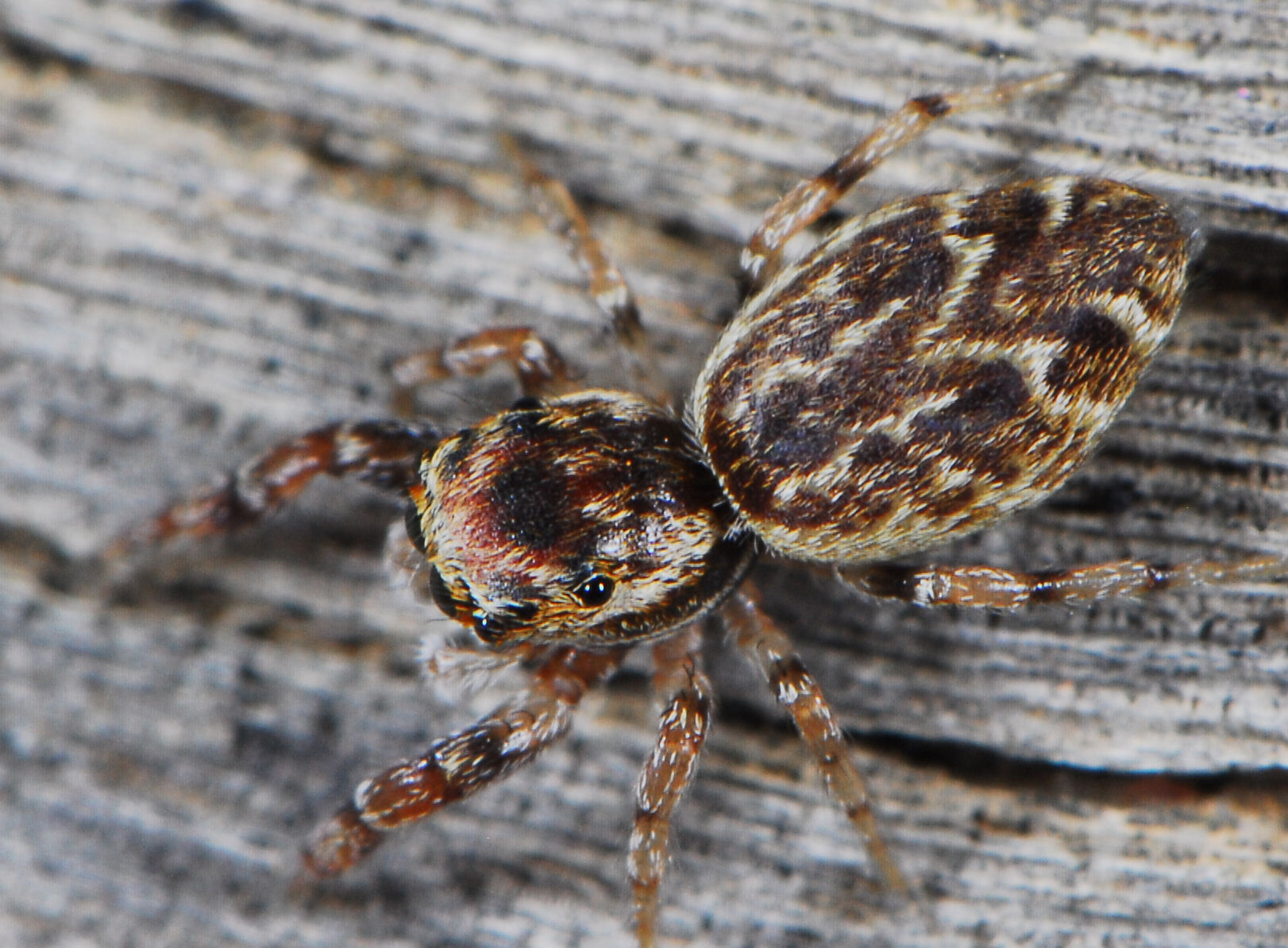
- female
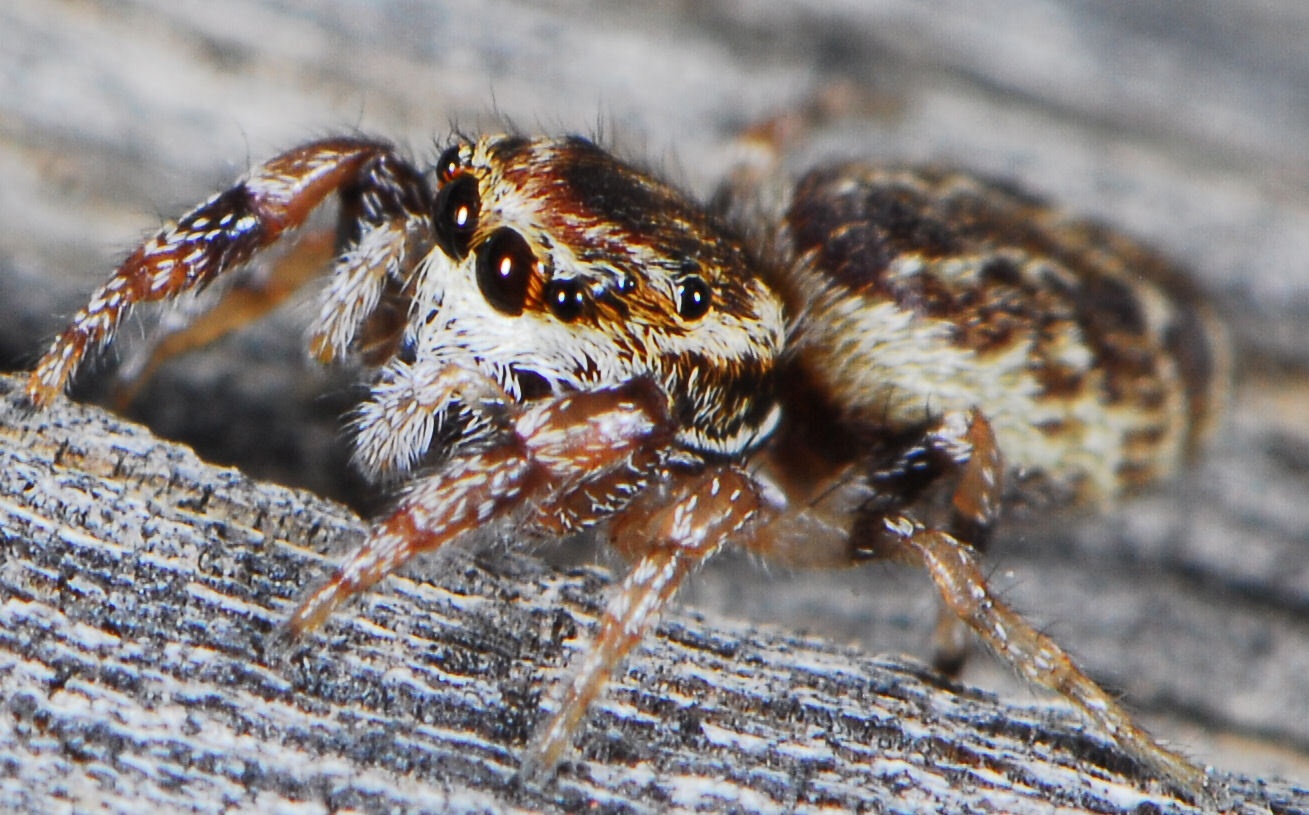
- female

Scientific classification
- Kingdom: Animalia
- Phylum: Arthropoda
- Subphylum: Chelicerata
- Class: Arachnida
- Order: Araneae
- Infraorder: Araneomorphae
- Family: Salticidae
- Genus: Dendryphantes
- Species: D. hararensis

Binomial name
- Dendryphantes hararensis Wesołowska & Cumming, 2008

= Dendryphantes hararensis =

Harare Dendryphantes Jumping Spider

Species of jumping spider

Dendryphantes hararensis is a species of jumping spider in the family Salticidae. It is endemic to southern Africa and is commonly known as the Harare Dendryphantes jumping spider.

== Distribution ==
Dendryphantes hararensis is found in South Africa and Zimbabwe.

In South Africa, it has been recorded from five provinces: Free State, Gauteng, KwaZulu-Natal, Limpopo, Mpumalanga, and North West. The species has been sampled in six protected areas including Golden Gate National Park, Roodeplaatdam Nature Reserve, Mkhuze Game Reserve, Marakele National Park, and Loskop Dam Nature Reserve.

== Habitat and ecology ==
Dendryphantes hararensis inhabits the Grassland and Savanna biomes at altitudes ranging from 131 to 2,826 m. The species is collected from the foliage of shrubs and has also been sampled from pine plantations. These spiders descend from the higher parts of trees onto surfaces below. Their prey includes small flies and hemipterans. Both adult sexes have been observed catching hatchling spiders inside the nests of other spider species such as Trichonephila and Oxyopes.

== Conservation ==
Dendryphantes hararensis is listed as Least Concern by the South African National Biodiversity Institute due to its wide geographical range. In South Africa, it is protected in several protected areas. There are no significant threats to the species.

== Etymology ==
The species is named after Harare, the capital city of Zimbabwe, where the type specimens were collected.

== Taxonomy ==
Dendryphantes hararensis was originally described by Wanda Wesołowska and Meg S. Cumming in 2008 from Zimbabwe. Both sexes are known.
