= Dendryphantes nicator =

Scientific classification
- Kingdom: Animalia
- Phylum: Arthropoda
- Subphylum: Chelicerata
- Class: Arachnida
- Order: Araneae
- Infraorder: Araneomorphae
- Family: Salticidae
- Genus: Dendryphantes
- Species: D. nicator

Binomial name
- Dendryphantes nicator Wesołowska & van Harten, 1994

Species of spider

Dendryphantes nicator is a species of jumping spider in the genus Dendryphantes that lives in Yemen. It was first described by Wanda Wesołowska & Antonius van Harten in 1994.
