= Dendryphantes arboretus =

Scientific classification
- Kingdom: Animalia
- Phylum: Arthropoda
- Subphylum: Chelicerata
- Class: Arachnida
- Order: Araneae
- Infraorder: Araneomorphae
- Family: Salticidae
- Genus: Dendryphantes
- Species: D. arboretus

Binomial name
- Dendryphantes arboretus Wesołowska & Cumming, 2008

Species of spider

Dendryphantes arboretus is a jumping spider in the genus Dendryphantes that lives in Zimbabwe.
