= Dendryphantes aethiopicus =

Scientific classification
- Kingdom: Animalia
- Phylum: Arthropoda
- Subphylum: Chelicerata
- Class: Arachnida
- Order: Araneae
- Infraorder: Araneomorphae
- Family: Salticidae
- Genus: Dendryphantes
- Species: D. aethiopicus

Binomial name
- Dendryphantes aethiopicus Wesołowska & Tomasiewicz, 2008

Species of spider

Dendryphantes aethiopicus is a jumping spider species that lives in Ethiopia. It was first described in 2008.
