= Dendryphantes schultzei =

Schultze's Dendryphantes Jumping Spider

Scientific classification
- Kingdom: Animalia
- Phylum: Arthropoda
- Subphylum: Chelicerata
- Class: Arachnida
- Order: Araneae
- Infraorder: Araneomorphae
- Family: Salticidae
- Genus: Dendryphantes
- Species: D. schultzei

Binomial name
- Dendryphantes schultzei Simon, 1910

Species of jumping spider

Dendryphantes schultzei is a species of jumping spider in the family Salticidae. It is endemic to southern Africa and is commonly known as Schultze's Dendryphantes jumping spider.

== Distribution ==
Dendryphantes schultzei is found in Namibia and South Africa.

In South Africa, it has been recorded from Northern Cape province. Known locations include Augrabies National Park, Namaqua National Park, and Port Nolloth. The species was also sampled from Luderitz Bay in Namibia.

== Habitat and ecology ==
Dendryphantes schultzei has been recorded at altitudes ranging from 14 to 725 m. Specimens from Namaqua National Park were collected by beating shrubs in hilltop fynbos. Little else is known about the species' behaviour.

== Conservation ==
Dendryphantes schultzei is listed as Data Deficient by the South African National Biodiversity Institute. Both South African and Namibian collections were made prior to 1910, with only two recent samples collected. The species may be undersampled as little sampling has been done in that area. More sampling is needed to determine the species' range.

== Taxonomy ==
Dendryphantes schultzei was originally described by Eugène Simon in 1910 from Port Nolloth in the Northern Cape. Both sexes are known.
