= Dendryphantes sanguineus =

Scientific classification
- Kingdom: Animalia
- Phylum: Arthropoda
- Subphylum: Chelicerata
- Class: Arachnida
- Order: Araneae
- Infraorder: Araneomorphae
- Family: Salticidae
- Genus: Dendryphantes
- Species: D. sanguineus

Binomial name
- Dendryphantes sanguineus Wesołowska, 2011

Species of spider

Dendryphantes sanguineus is a jumping spider species in the genus Dendryphantes that lives in Zimbabwe. It was first described by Wanda Wesołowska in 2011.
