= Dendryphantes limpopo =

Limpopo Dendryphantes Jumping Spider

Scientific classification
- Kingdom: Animalia
- Phylum: Arthropoda
- Subphylum: Chelicerata
- Class: Arachnida
- Order: Araneae
- Infraorder: Araneomorphae
- Family: Salticidae
- Genus: Dendryphantes
- Species: D. limpopo

Binomial name
- Dendryphantes limpopo Wesołowska & Haddad, 2013

Species of jumping spider

Dendryphantes limpopo is a species of jumping spider in the family Salticidae. It is endemic to South Africa and is commonly known as the Limpopo Dendryphantes jumping spider.

== Distribution ==
Dendryphantes limpopo is found only in South Africa, where it has been recorded from KwaZulu-Natal and Limpopo provinces. Known locations include Mkuze Game Reserve in iSimangaliso Wetland Park and Naboomspruit/Mookgopong in Limpopo.

== Habitat and ecology ==
Dendryphantes limpopo inhabits the Savanna Biome at altitudes ranging from 131 to 1,262 m. The species has been collected from broad-leaved deciduous trees by canopy fogging in savanna woodland.

== Conservation ==
Dendryphantes limpopo is listed as Data Deficient for taxonomic reasons by the South African National Biodiversity Institute. The species has a restricted range and is protected in Mkuze Game Reserve. More sampling is needed to collect the male and determine the species' full range.

== Taxonomy ==
Dendryphantes limpopo was originally described by Wanda Wesołowska and Charles R. Haddad in 2013 from Naboomspruit/Mookgopong in Limpopo province. Only the female is known.
