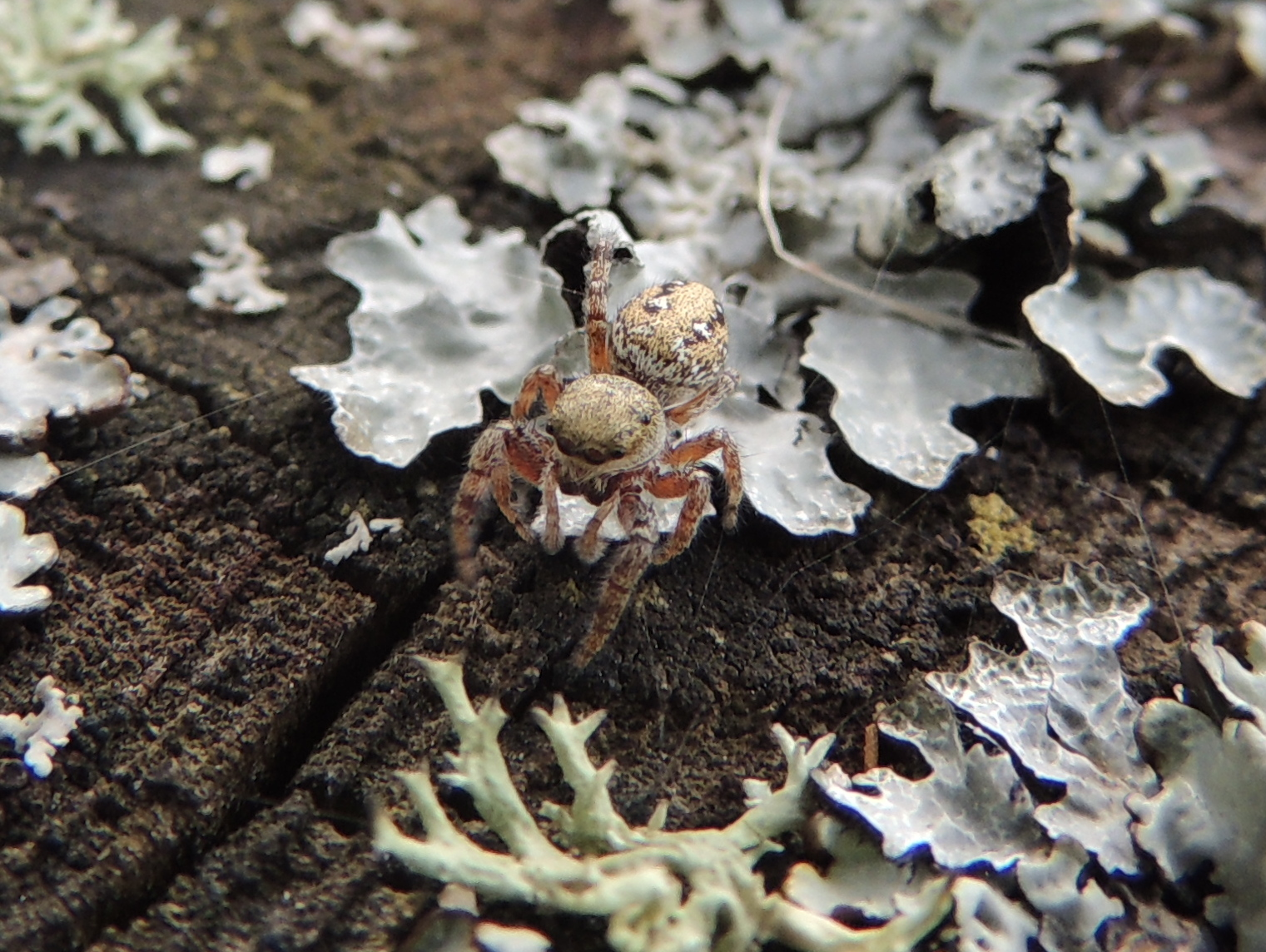

Scientific classification
- Kingdom: Animalia
- Phylum: Arthropoda
- Subphylum: Chelicerata
- Class: Arachnida
- Order: Araneae
- Infraorder: Araneomorphae
- Family: Salticidae
- Genus: Dendryphantes
- Species: D. elgonensis

Binomial name
- Dendryphantes elgonensis (Clerck, 1757)

= Dendryphantes hastatus =

Species of spider

Dendryphantes hastatus is a jumping spider species in the genus Dendryphantes that lives in the Palearctic.

female

male
