= Dendryphantes ruwenzori =

Scientific classification
- Kingdom: Animalia
- Phylum: Arthropoda
- Subphylum: Chelicerata
- Class: Arachnida
- Order: Araneae
- Infraorder: Araneomorphae
- Family: Salticidae
- Genus: Dendryphantes
- Species: D. ruwenzori

Binomial name
- Dendryphantes ruwenzori Wiśniewski & Wesołowska, 2024

Species of jumping spider

Dendryphantes ruwenzori is a species of jumping spider in the genus Dendryphantes that lives in Uganda.
