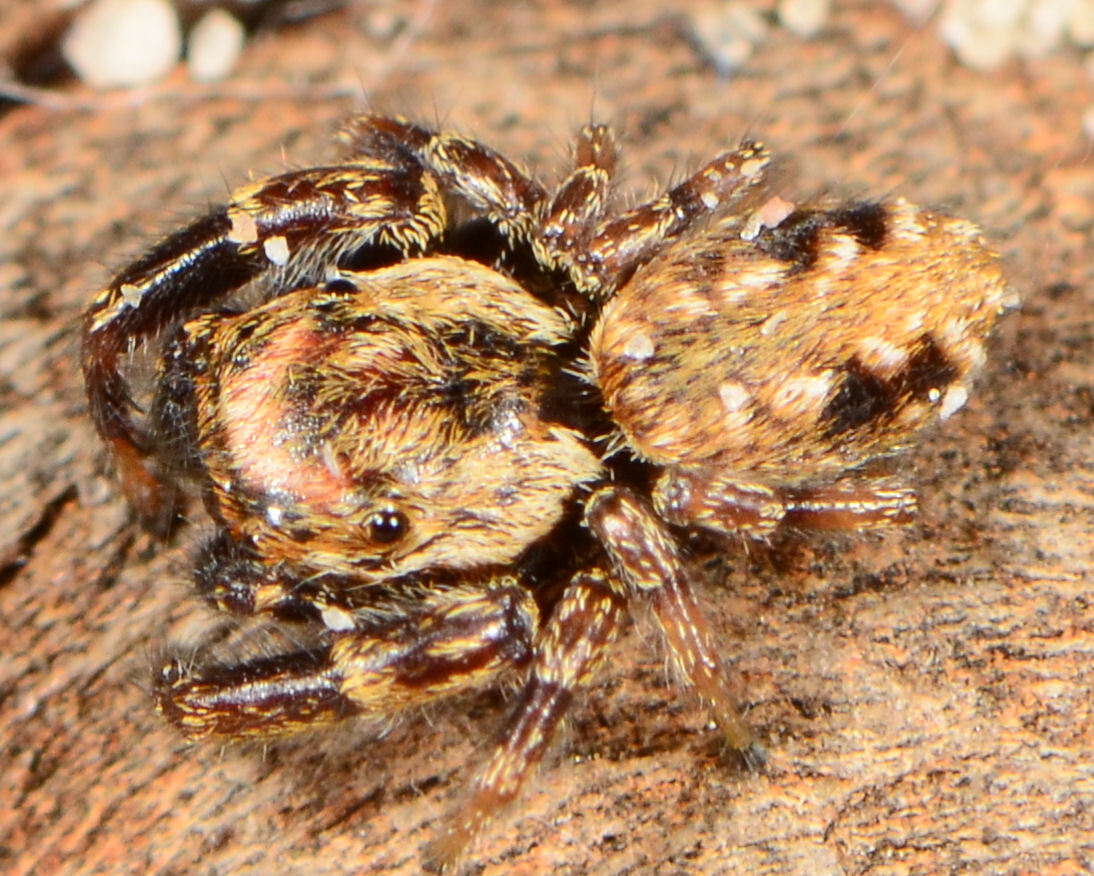
- male
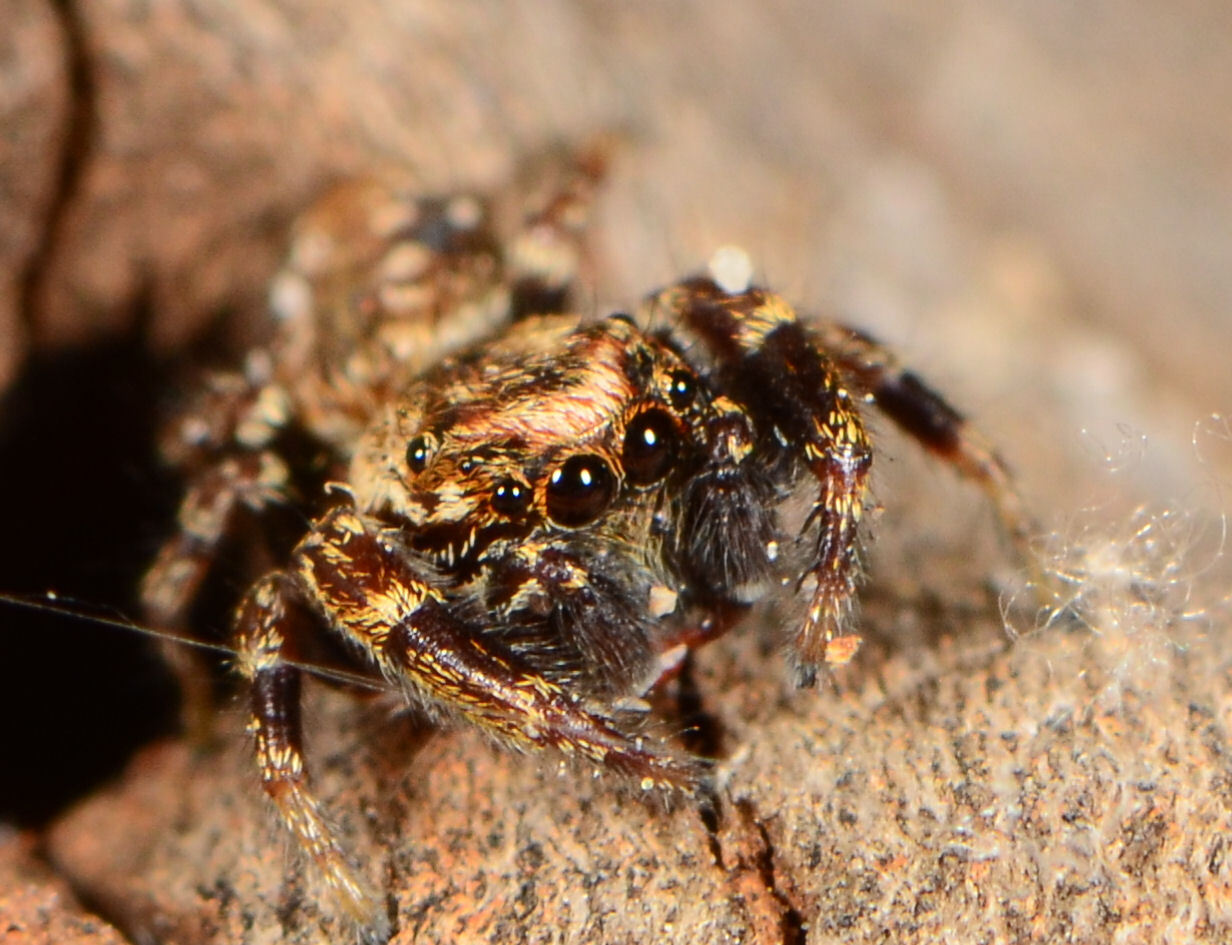
- male

Scientific classification
- Kingdom: Animalia
- Phylum: Arthropoda
- Subphylum: Chelicerata
- Class: Arachnida
- Order: Araneae
- Infraorder: Araneomorphae
- Family: Salticidae
- Genus: Dendryphantes
- Species: D. purcelli

Binomial name
- Dendryphantes purcelli Peckham & Peckham, 1903

Synonyms
- Dendryphantes purcellii Peckham & Peckham, 1903

= Dendryphantes purcelli =

Purcell's Dendryphantes Jumping Spider

Species of jumping spider

Dendryphantes purcelli is a species of jumping spider in the family Salticidae. It occurs in southern Africa and St. Helena and is commonly known as Purcell's Dendryphantes jumping spider.

== Distribution ==
Dendryphantes purcelli is found in Lesotho, South Africa, and was introduced to St. Helena.

In South Africa, it has been recorded from Eastern Cape, Free State, KwaZulu-Natal, and Western Cape. The species has been sampled in nine protected areas including Addo Elephant National Park, Golden Gate Highlands National Park, Mountain Zebra National Park, Tsolwana Nature Reserve, Giant's Castle Nature Reserve, De Hoop Nature Reserve, and Table Mountain National Park.

== Habitat and ecology ==
Dendryphantes purcelli inhabits the Fynbos, Grassland, Thicket, and Savanna biomes at altitudes ranging from 6 to 2,584 m. The species is collected from the foliage of shrubs and has also been recorded from pine plantations.

== Conservation ==
Dendryphantes purcelli is listed as Least Concern by the South African National Biodiversity Institute due to its wide geographical range. It is protected in several protected areas. There are no significant threats to the species.

== Etymology ==
Dendryphantes purcelli is named after William Frederick Purcell, a South African arachnologist and museum curator who made significant contributions to the study of South African spiders.

== Taxonomy ==
Dendryphantes purcelli was originally described by George and Elizabeth Peckham in 1903 from Bergvliet in the Western Cape. The species was redescribed by Haddad and Wesołowska in 2011. Both sexes are known.
