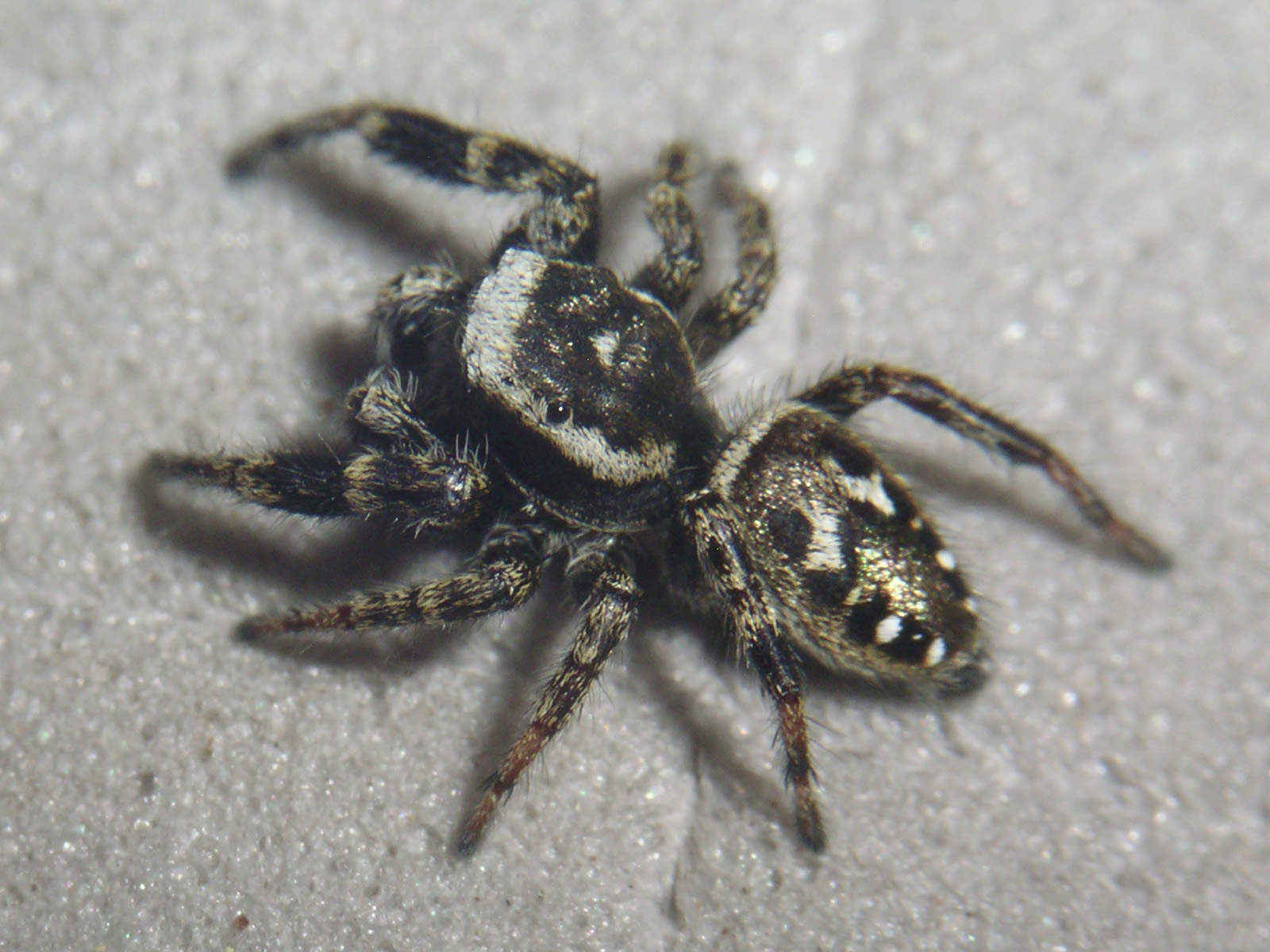

Conservation status
- Secure (NatureServe)

Scientific classification
- Kingdom: Animalia
- Phylum: Arthropoda
- Subphylum: Chelicerata
- Class: Arachnida
- Order: Araneae
- Infraorder: Araneomorphae
- Family: Salticidae
- Genus: Dendryphantes
- Species: D. nigromaculatus

Binomial name
- Dendryphantes nigromaculatus Keyserling, 1885

= Dendryphantes nigromaculatus =

Species of spider

Dendryphantes nigromaculatus, commonly known as the blackmarked jumping spider, is a species of jumping spider that lives in the United States and Canada.
