= Dendryphantes elgonensis =

Scientific classification
- Kingdom: Animalia
- Phylum: Arthropoda
- Subphylum: Chelicerata
- Class: Arachnida
- Order: Araneae
- Infraorder: Araneomorphae
- Family: Salticidae
- Genus: Dendryphantes
- Species: D. elgonensis

Binomial name
- Dendryphantes elgonensis Wesołowska & Dawidowicz, 2014

Species of spider

Dendryphantes elgonensis is a jumping spider species in the genus Dendryphantes that lives in Kenya. The male was first described in 2014.
