= Stertinius =

Scientific classification
- Kingdom: Animalia
- Phylum: Arthropoda
- Subphylum: Chelicerata
- Class: Arachnida
- Order: Araneae
- Infraorder: Araneomorphae
- Family: Salticidae
- Subfamily: Salticinae
- Genus: Stertinius; Simon, 1890

Type species
- S. dentichelis Simon, 1890

Species
- 12, see text

Genus of spiders

Stertinius is a genus of Asian jumping spiders that was first described by Eugène Louis Simon in 1890.

== Species ==
As of August 2019 it contains twelve species, found only in Asia:

- Stertinius borneensis Logunov, 2018 – Malaysia (Borneo)
- Stertinius capucinus Simon, 1902 – Indonesia (Java)
- Stertinius cyprius Merian, 1911 – Indonesia (Sulawesi)
- Stertinius dentichelis Simon, 1890 (type) – Mariana Is.
- Stertinius kumadai Logunov, Ikeda & Ono, 1997 – Japan
- Stertinius magnificus Merian, 1911 – Indonesia (Sulawesi)
- Stertinius niger Merian, 1911 – Indonesia (Sulawesi)
- Stertinius nobilis (Thorell, 1890) – Indonesia (Sulawesi)
- Stertinius onoi Prószyński & Deeleman-Reinhold, 2013 – Borneo
- Stertinius patellaris Simon, 1902 – Indonesia (Moluccas)
- Stertinius pilipes Simon, 1902 – Philippines
- Stertinius splendens Simon, 1902 – Indonesia (Sulawesi)
