= Dendryphantes neethlingi =

Neethling's Dendryphantes Jumping Spider

Scientific classification
- Kingdom: Animalia
- Phylum: Arthropoda
- Subphylum: Chelicerata
- Class: Arachnida
- Order: Araneae
- Infraorder: Araneomorphae
- Family: Salticidae
- Genus: Dendryphantes
- Species: D. neethlingi

Binomial name
- Dendryphantes neethlingi Haddad & Wesołowska, 2013

Species of jumping spider

Dendryphantes neethlingi is a species of jumping spider in the family Salticidae. It is endemic to South Africa and is commonly known as Neethling's Dendryphantes jumping spider.

== Distribution ==
Dendryphantes neethlingi is found only in South Africa.

Within South Africa, it is known exclusively from Champagne Valley in the Drakensberg, KwaZulu-Natal province.

== Habitat and ecology ==
Dendryphantes neethlingi inhabits alpine grasslands at an altitude of 1,099 m. The species was collected by canopy fogging a Vachellia sp. tree.

== Conservation ==
Dendryphantes neethlingi is listed as Data Deficient for taxonomic reasons by the South African National Biodiversity Institute. The species is known only from the type locality in the Drakensberg. More canopy sampling is needed to collect the female and determine the species' full range.

== Etymology ==
The species is named after South African arachnologist Jan Andries Neethling.

== Taxonomy ==
Dendryphantes neethlingi was originally described by Charles R. Haddad and Wanda Wesołowska in 2013 from Champagne Valley in the Drakensberg. Only the male is known.
