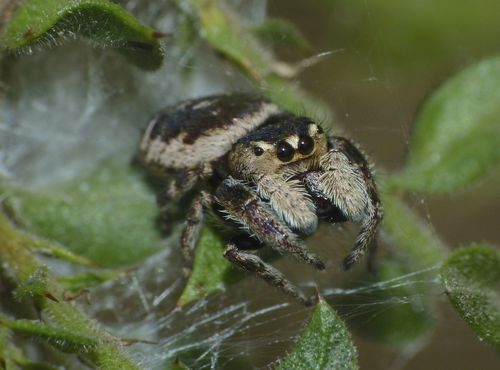
- Simaetha thoracica

Scientific classification
- Kingdom: Animalia
- Phylum: Arthropoda
- Subphylum: Chelicerata
- Class: Arachnida
- Order: Araneae
- Infraorder: Araneomorphae
- Family: Salticidae
- Subfamily: Salticinae
- Genus: Simaetha; Thorell, 1881

Type species
- S. thoracica Thorell, 1881

Species
- 23, see text

= Simaetha =

Genus of spiders

Simaetha is a genus of Australasian jumping spiders that was first described by Tamerlan Thorell in 1881. They resemble members of Simaethula and Stertinius.

== Species ==
As of August 2022, it contains 23 species, found only in Asia, Papua New Guinea, and Australia:

- Simaetha almadenensis Zabka, 1994 – Australia (Queensland, New South Wales)
- Simaetha atypica Zabka, 1994 – Australia (Northern Territory)
- Simaetha broomei Zabka, 1994 – Australia (Western Australia)
- Simaetha cheni (Wang & Li, 2021) – China
- Simaetha cingulata (Karsch, 1892) – Sri Lanka
- Simaetha colemani Zabka, 1994 – Australia (Queensland)
- Simaetha damongpalaya Barrion & Litsinger, 1995 – Philippines
- Simaetha deelemanae Zhang, Song & Li, 2003 – Singapore
- Simaetha furiosa (Hogg, 1919) – Indonesia (Sumatra)
- Simaetha gongi Peng, Gong & Kim, 2000 – China
- Simaetha huigang (Wang & Li, 2022) – China
- Simaetha knowlesi Zabka, 1994 – New Guinea, Australia (Western Australia)
- Simaetha laminata (Karsch, 1892) – Sri Lanka
- Simaetha makinanga Barrion & Litsinger, 1995 – Philippines
- Simaetha menglun (Wang & Li, 2020) – China
- Simaetha paetula (Keyserling, 1882) – New Guinea, Australia (Western Australia, Queensland)
- Simaetha papuana Zabka, 1994 – New Guinea
- Simaetha pengi (Wang & Li, 2020) – China
- Simaetha reducta (Karsch, 1892) – Sri Lanka
- Simaetha robustior (Keyserling, 1882) – New Guinea, Australia (Queensland)
- Simaetha tenuidens (Keyserling, 1882) – New Guinea, Australia (Queensland)
- Simaetha tenuior (Keyserling, 1882) – New Guinea, Australia (Western Australia, Queensland)
- Simaetha thoracica Thorell, 1881 (type) – Australia (Western Australia, Queensland)

Irura bidenticulata was initially mistaken by taxonomists for a species belonging to this genus.
