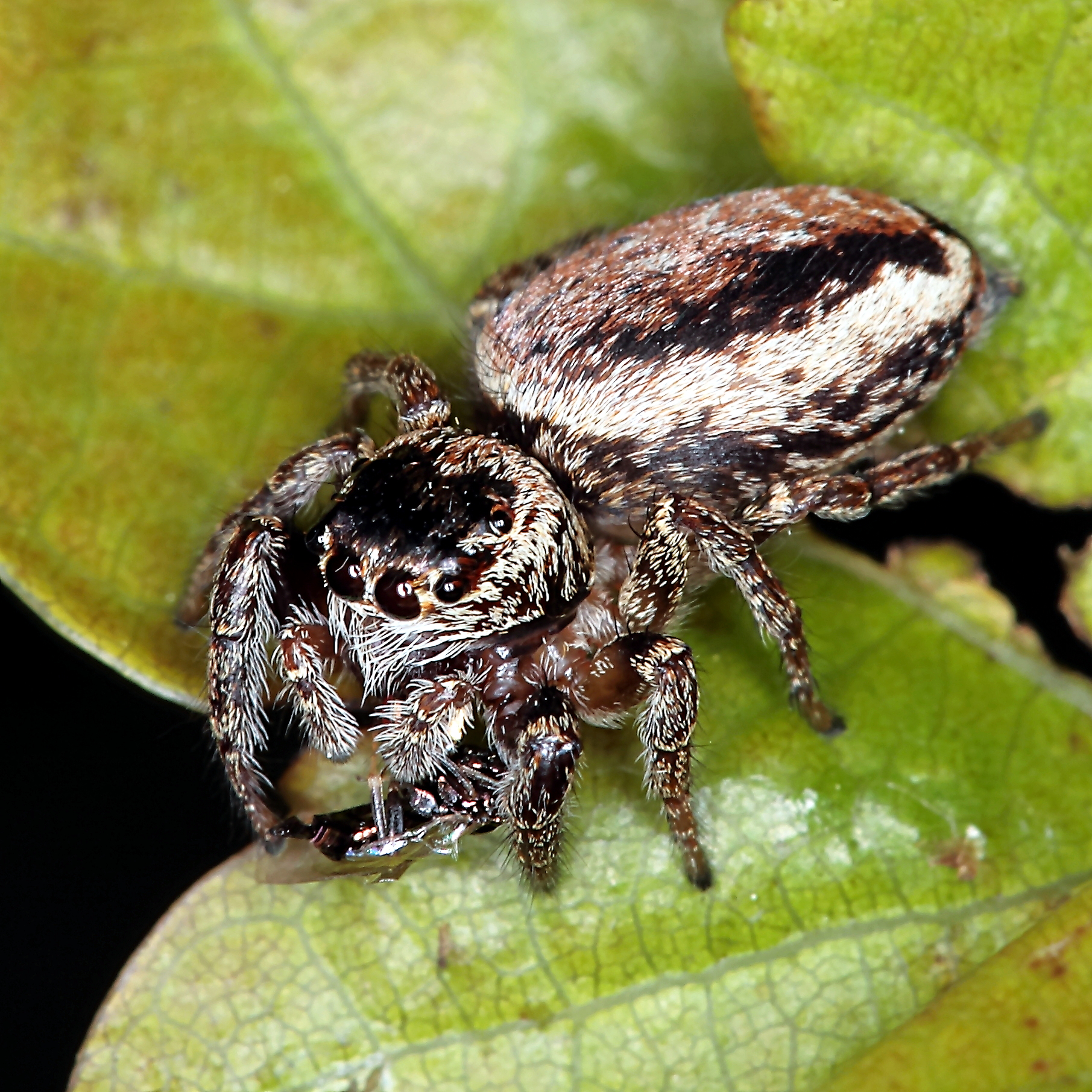
- Dendryphantes rudis on oak leaf in western Saxony
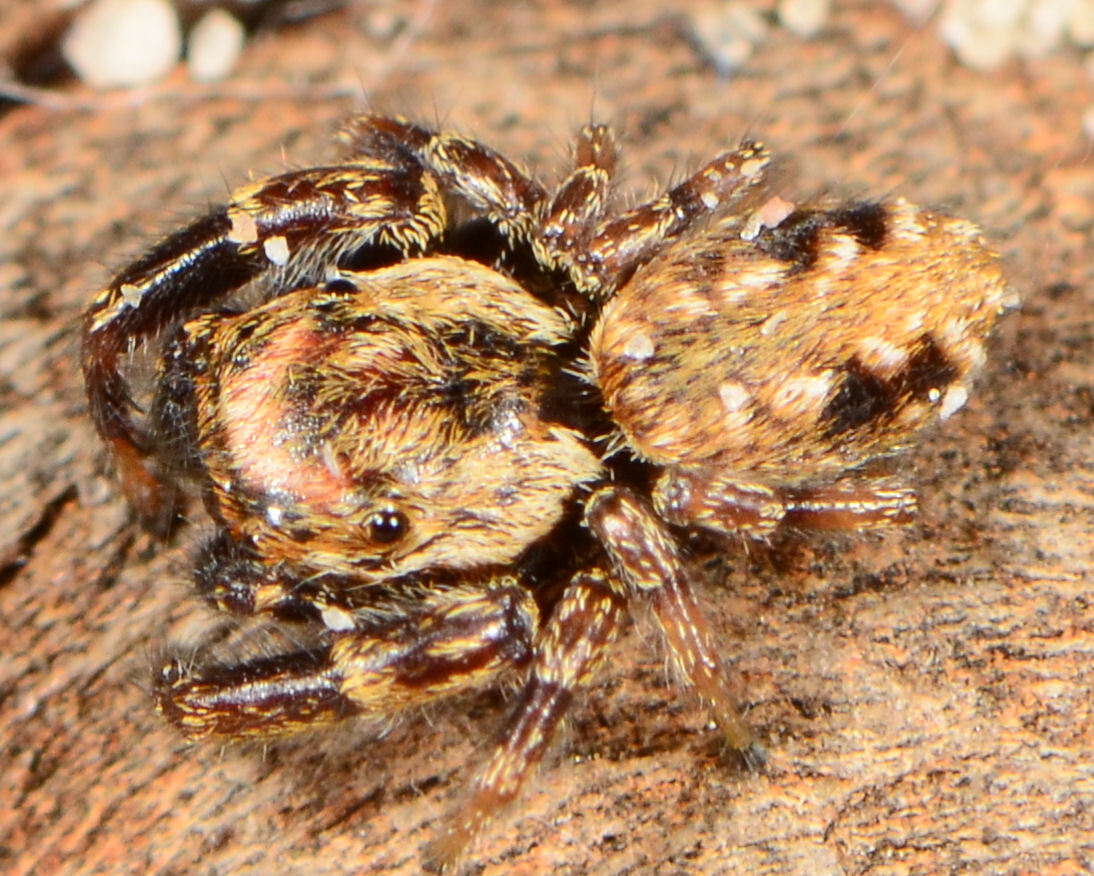
- male D. purcelli

Scientific classification
- Kingdom: Animalia
- Phylum: Arthropoda
- Subphylum: Chelicerata
- Class: Arachnida
- Order: Araneae
- Infraorder: Araneomorphae
- Family: Salticidae
- Subfamily: Salticinae
- Genus: Dendryphantes; C. L. Koch, 1837

Type species
- D. hastatus (Clerck, 1757)

Species
- 72, see text
- blue: reported countries (WSC)

= Dendryphantes =

Genus of spiders

Dendryphantes is a genus of jumping spiders that was first described by Carl Ludwig Koch in 1837.

== Distribution ==
Spiders in this genus are found on all inhabited continents except Australia.

== Species ==
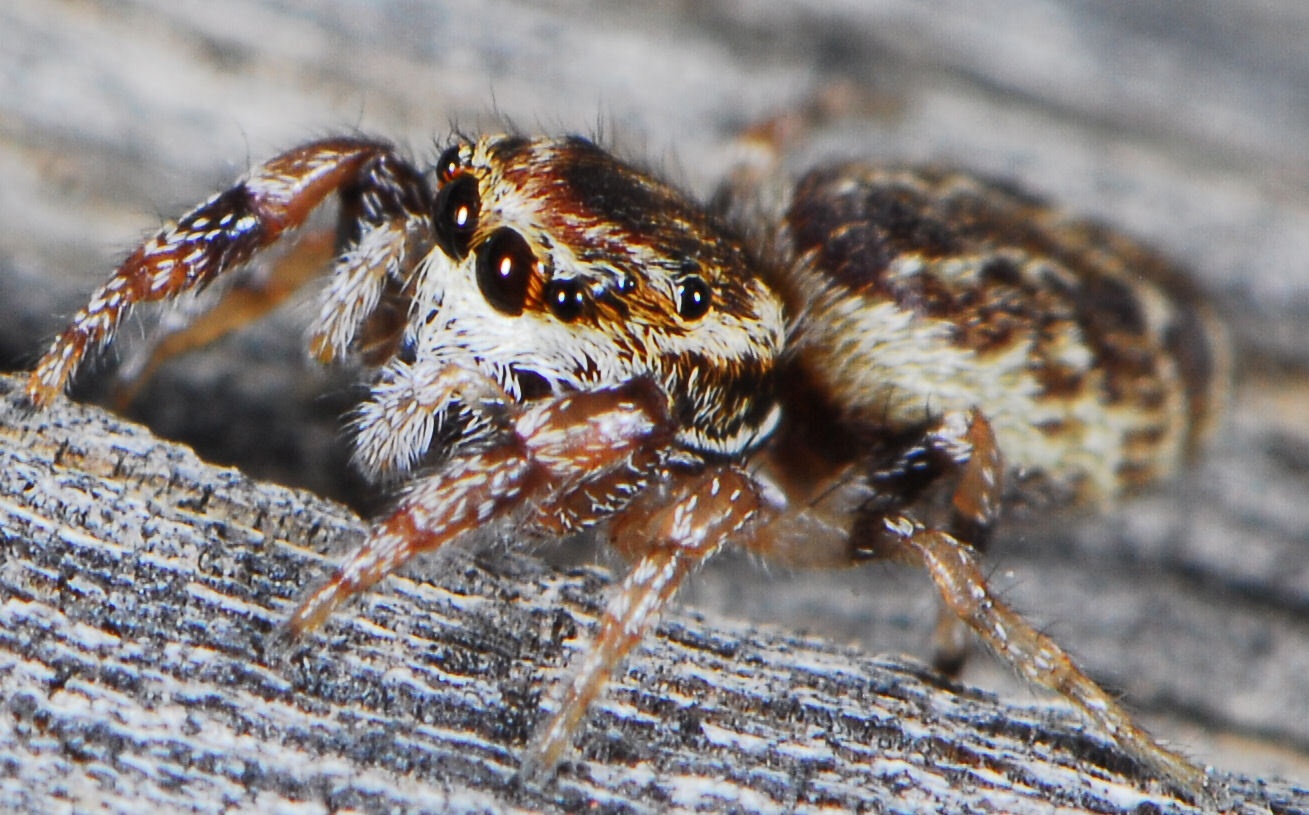
D. hararensis

D. mendicus

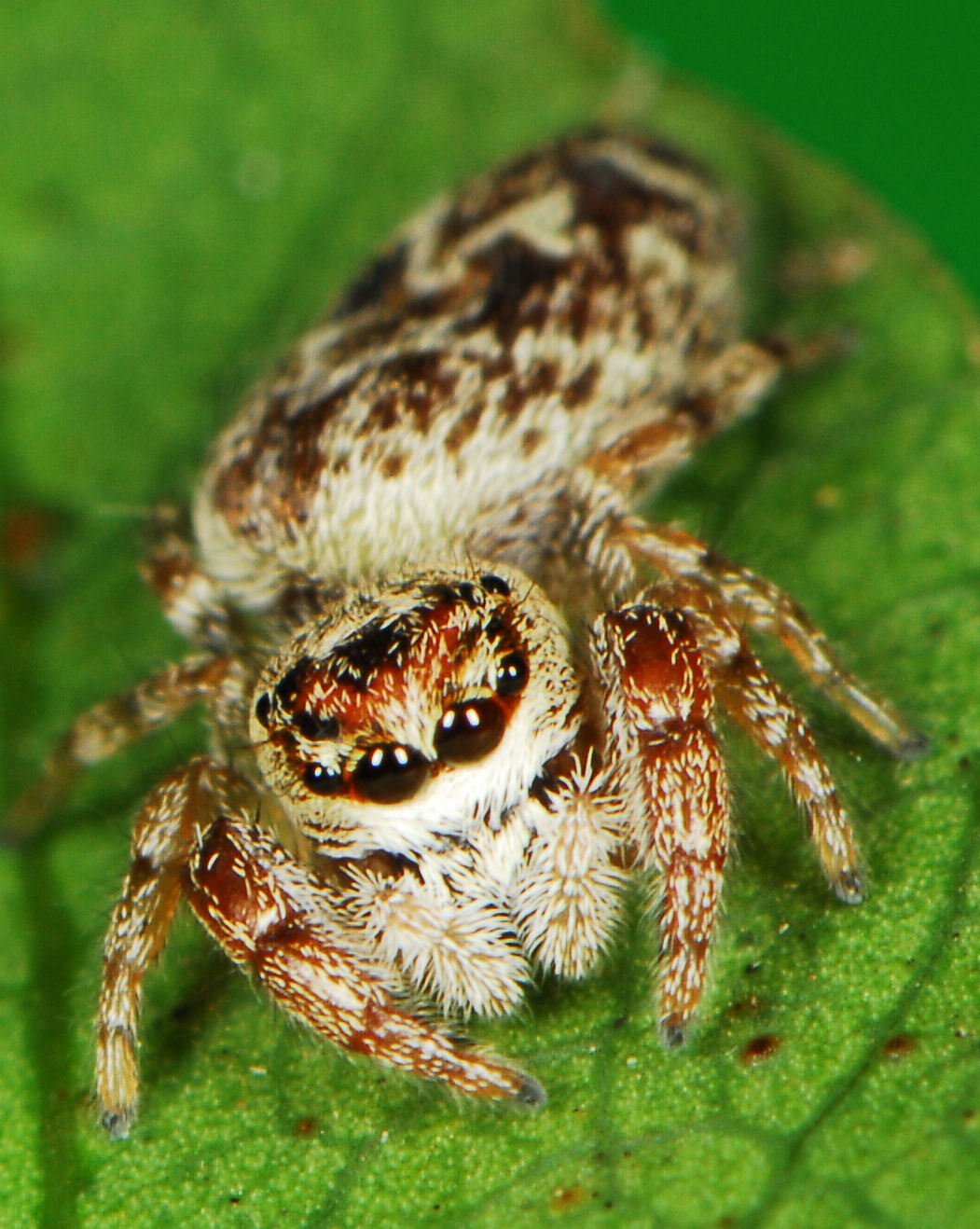
D. silvestris

As of October 2025, this genus includes 72 species:

- Dendryphantes acutus Wesołowska & Haddad, 2014 – Lesotho, South Africa
- Dendryphantes aethiopicus Wesołowska & Tomasiewicz, 2008 – Ethiopia
- Dendryphantes alanicus Logunov & Ponomarev, 2020 – Russia (Caucasus)
- Dendryphantes amphibolus Chamberlin, 1916 – Peru
- Dendryphantes andinus Chamberlin, 1916 – Peru
- Dendryphantes arboretus Wesołowska & Cumming, 2008 – Zimbabwe
- Dendryphantes barguzinensis Danilov, 1997 – Russia (South Siberia)
- Dendryphantes barrosmachadoi Caporiacco, 1955 – Venezuela
- Dendryphantes biankii Prószyński, 1979 – Russia (Middle and South Siberia, Far East), Mongolia, China
- Dendryphantes bisquinquepunctatus Taczanowski, 1878 – Peru
- Dendryphantes calus Chamberlin, 1916 – Peru
- Dendryphantes caporiaccoi Roewer, 1951 – Pakistan (Karakorum)
- Dendryphantes centromaculatus Taczanowski, 1878 – Peru
- Dendryphantes chuldensis Prószyński, 1982 – Mongolia
- Dendryphantes comatus Karsch, 1880 – Syria
- Dendryphantes czekanowskii Prószyński, 1979 – Russia (Urals to Far East), Japan
- Dendryphantes darchan Logunov, 1993 – Mongolia
- Dendryphantes duodecempunctatus Mello-Leitão, 1943 – Argentina
- Dendryphantes elgonensis Wesołowska & Dawidowicz, 2014 – Uganda, Kenya, Mozambique
- Dendryphantes fulvipes (Mello-Leitão, 1943) – Chile
- Dendryphantes fulviventris (Lucas, 1846) – Spain, Morocco, Algeria, Tunisia
- Dendryphantes fusconotatus (Grube, 1861) – Russia (Urals to Far East), Mongolia, China
- Dendryphantes hararensis Wesołowska & Cumming, 2008 – Zimbabwe, South Africa
- Dendryphantes hastatus (Clerck, 1757) – Europe, Russia (Europe to Middle and South Siberia), Kazakhstan, China (type species)
- Dendryphantes hewitti Lessert, 1925 – Guinea, Uganda, Kenya, Tanzania, Mozambique
- Dendryphantes holmi Wesołowska & Dawidowicz, 2014 – Uganda, Kenya
- Dendryphantes honestus (C. L. Koch, 1846) – Brazil
- Dendryphantes legibilis (Nicolet, 1849) – Chile
- Dendryphantes lepidus (G. W. Peckham & E. G. Peckham, 1901) – Brazil
- Dendryphantes limpopo Wesołowska & Haddad, 2013 – South Africa
- Dendryphantes linzhiensis Hu, 2001 – China
- Dendryphantes luridus Wesołowska & Dawidowicz, 2014 – Kenya
- Dendryphantes madrynensis Mello-Leitão, 1940 – Argentina
- Dendryphantes matumi Haddad & Wesołowska, 2013 – South Africa
- Dendryphantes mendicus (C. L. Koch, 1846) – Caribbean
- Dendryphantes minutus Wesołowska & Dawidowicz, 2014 – Kenya
- Dendryphantes modestus (Mello-Leitão, 1941) – Argentina
- Dendryphantes mordax (C. L. Koch, 1846) – Chile, Argentina, Uruguay
- Dendryphantes neethlingi Haddad & Wesołowska, 2013 – South Africa
- Dendryphantes nicator Wesołowska & van Harten, 1994 – Yemen
- Dendryphantes nigromaculatus (Keyserling, 1885) – Canada, United States
- Dendryphantes niveornatus Mello-Leitão, 1936 – Chile
- Dendryphantes nobilis (C. L. Koch, 1846) – South America
- Dendryphantes ovchinnikovi Logunov & Marusik, 1994 – Kazakhstan, Kyrgyzstan
- Dendryphantes patagonicus Simon, 1905 – Argentina
- Dendryphantes potanini Logunov, 1993 – China
- Dendryphantes praeposterus Denis, 1958 – Afghanistan
- Dendryphantes pseudochuldensis Peng, Xie & Kim, 1994 – China
- Dendryphantes pugnax (C. L. Koch, 1846) – Mexico
- Dendryphantes purcelli G. W. Peckham & E. G. Peckham, 1903 – St. Helena, South Africa, Lesotho
- Dendryphantes quaesitus Wesołowska & van Harten, 1994 – Yemen
- Dendryphantes rafalskii Wesołowska, 2000 – Zimbabwe, South Africa
- Dendryphantes ravidus (Simon, 1868) – Poland, Belarus
- Dendryphantes reimoseri Roewer, 1951 – Brazil
- Dendryphantes rudis (Sundevall, 1833) – Europe, Turkey, Caucasus, Russia (Europe to Far East), Kazakhstan
- Dendryphantes ruwenzori Wiśniewski & Wesołowska, 2024 – Uganda
- Dendryphantes sacci Simon, 1886 – Bolivia
- Dendryphantes sanguineus Wesołowska, 2011 – Zimbabwe
- Dendryphantes sasa Wiśniewski & Wesołowska, 2024 – Uganda
- Dendryphantes schultzei Simon, 1910 – Namibia, South Africa
- Dendryphantes secretus Wesołowska, 1995 – Kazakhstan
- Dendryphantes sedulus (Blackwall, 1865) – Cape Verde
- Dendryphantes seriatus Taczanowski, 1878 – Peru
- Dendryphantes serratus Wesołowska & Dawidowicz, 2014 – Kenya
- Dendryphantes sexguttatus (Mello-Leitão, 1945) – Argentina
- Dendryphantes silvestris Wesołowska & Haddad, 2013 – South Africa
- Dendryphantes strenuus (C. L. Koch, 1846) – Mexico
- Dendryphantes subtilis Wesołowska & Dawidowicz, 2014 – Kenya
- Dendryphantes tuvinensis Logunov, 1991 – Russia (South Siberia), Kazakhstan, Mongolia
- Dendryphantes villarrica Richardson, 2010 – Chile
- Dendryphantes yadongensis Hu, 2001 – China
- Dendryphantes zygoballoides Chamberlin, 1924 – Mexico
