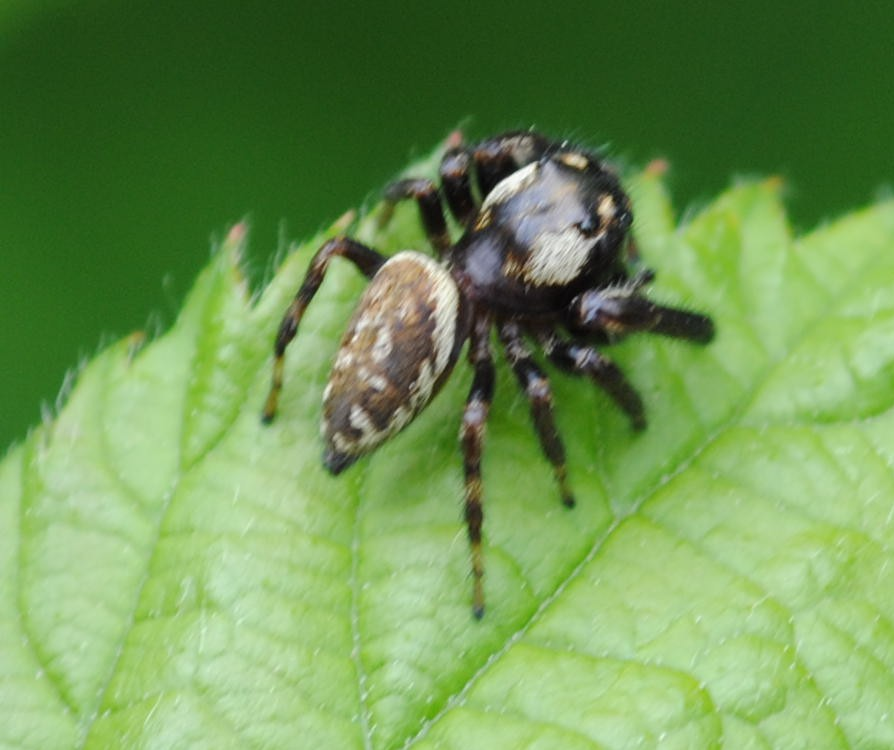
- Male M. nidicolens from Cologne, Germany

Scientific classification
- Kingdom: Animalia
- Phylum: Arthropoda
- Subphylum: Chelicerata
- Class: Arachnida
- Order: Araneae
- Infraorder: Araneomorphae
- Family: Salticidae
- Subfamily: Salticinae
- Genus: Macaroeris; Wunderlich, 1992

Type species
- Aranea nidicolens Walckenaer, 1802

Species
- See text.

= Macaroeris =

Genus of spiders

Macaroeris is a spider genus of the jumping spider family, Salticidae.

== Name ==
The genus name is combined from Macaronesia, where most species of the genus occur, and the salticid spider genus Eris.

== Species ==
As of June 2017, the World Spider Catalog lists the following species in the genus:

- Macaroeris albosignata Schmidt & Krause, 1996 – Canary Islands
- Macaroeris asiatica Logunov & Rakov, 1998 – Central Asia
- Macaroeris cata (Blackwall, 1867) – Madeira, Romania
- Macaroeris desertensis Wunderlich, 1992 – Madeira
- Macaroeris diligens (Blackwall, 1867) – Madeira, Canary Islands
- Macaroeris flavicomis (Simon, 1885) – Greece, Turkey, Ukraine
- Macaroeris litoralis Wunderlich, 1992 – Canary Islands
- Macaroeris moebi (Bösenberg, 1895) – Canary Islands, Savage Islands, Madeira, China
- Macaroeris nidicolens (Walckenaer, 1802) – Europe to Central Asia
