= Apollo =

Ancient Greek god

- God of oracles, healing, archery, music and arts, knowledge, herds and flocks, and protection of the young
- Member of the twelve Olympians
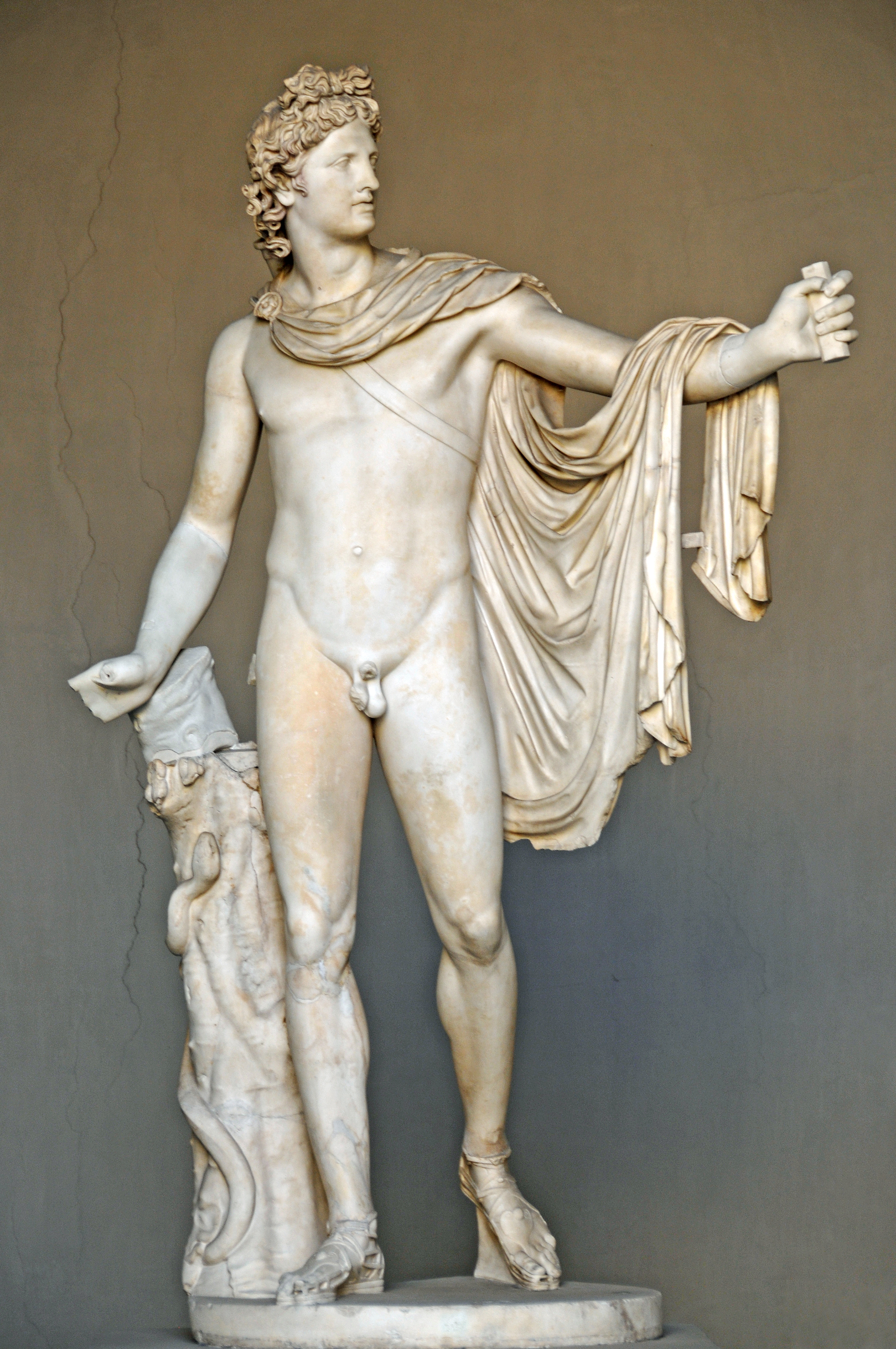
- Apollo Belvedere, a 2nd-century CE Roman copy of a Greek original from c. 330 BC
- Abode: Mount Olympus
- Planet: Sun
- Animals: Raven, swan, wolf
- Symbol: Lyre, laurel wreath, python, bow and arrows
- Tree: laurel, cypress
- Mount: A chariot drawn by swans

Genealogy
- Born: Delos
- Parents: Zeus and Leto
- Siblings: Artemis (twin)

Equivalents
- Celtic: Grannus

Apollo (Note: Attic, Ionic, Homeric and Koine Greek: Ἀπόλλων, romanized: Apóllōn, genitive: Ἀπόλλωνος, romanized: Apóllōnos Attic–Ionic pronunciation: [a.pól.lɔːn], [a.pól.lɔː.nos]; Koine Greek: [aˈpol.lon], [aˈpol.lo.nos] Doric Greek: Ἀπέλλων, romanized: Apéllōn, Doric Greek pronunciation: [a.pel.lɔ̂ːn]; Arcadocypriot Greek:: Ἀπείλων, romanized: Apeílōn, Arcadocypriot Greek: [a.pěː.lɔːn]; Aeolic Greek: Ἄπλουν, romanized: Áploun, Aeolic Greek: [á.ploːn] Latin: Apollō, genitive: Apollinis, Classical Latin: [ɑˈpɔlːoː], [ɑˈpɔl.lʲɪ.nɪs̠]; Late Latin: [ɑˈpɔl.lɔ], [ɑˈpɔl.li.nis]) is one of the Olympian deities in ancient Greek religion and mythology. His numerous functions include healing, prophecy, music, poetry, and archery. He is the son of Zeus and Leto, and the twin brother of Artemis, goddess of the hunt. He is considered to be the most beautiful god and is represented as the ideal of the kouros or ephebe, a beardless, athletic youth.

As the patron deity of Delphi (Apollo Pythios), Apollo is an oracular god—the prophetic deity of the Delphic Oracle and the deity of ritual purification. His oracles were often consulted for guidance in various matters. He was in general seen as the god who affords help and wards off evil, and is referred to as Alexicacus, the "averter of evil". Medicine and healing are associated with Apollo, whether through the god himself or mediated through his son Asclepius. Apollo delivered people from epidemics, yet he is also a god who could bring ill health and deadly plague with his arrows. The invention of archery itself is credited to Apollo and his sister Artemis. Apollo is usually described as carrying a silver or golden bow and a quiver of arrows.

As the god of mousike, (Note: Mousike (the art of the Muses) was an integral part of life in the ancient Greek world, and the term covered not only music but also dance, lyrics, theatre and the performance of poetry.) Apollo presides over all music, songs, dance, and poetry. He is the inventor of string-music and the frequent companion of the Muses, functioning as their chorus leader in celebrations. The lyre is a common attribute of Apollo. Protection of the young is one of the best attested facets of his Panhellenic cult persona. As a kourotrophos, Apollo is concerned with the health and education of children, and he presided over their passage into adulthood. Long hair, which was the prerogative of boys, was cut at the coming of age (ephebeia) and dedicated to Apollo. The god himself is depicted with long, uncut hair to symbolise his eternal youth.

Apollo is an important pastoral deity, and he was the patron of herdsmen and shepherds. Protection of herds, flocks and crops from diseases, pests and predators were his primary rustic duties. On the other hand, Apollo also encouraged the founding of new towns and the establishment of civil constitutions, is associated with dominion over colonists, and was the giver of laws. His oracles were often consulted before setting laws in a city. Apollo Agyieus was the protector of the streets, public places and home entrances. In the 5th century BC, his worship was imported to Rome.

From the 5th century BC, Apollo was often identified with Helios, the personification of the Sun. Although Latin theological works from at least the 1st century BC identified Apollo with Sol, there was no conflation between the two among the classical Latin poets until the 1st century AD. Apollo is known in Greek-influenced Etruscan mythology as Apulu.

== Etymology ==
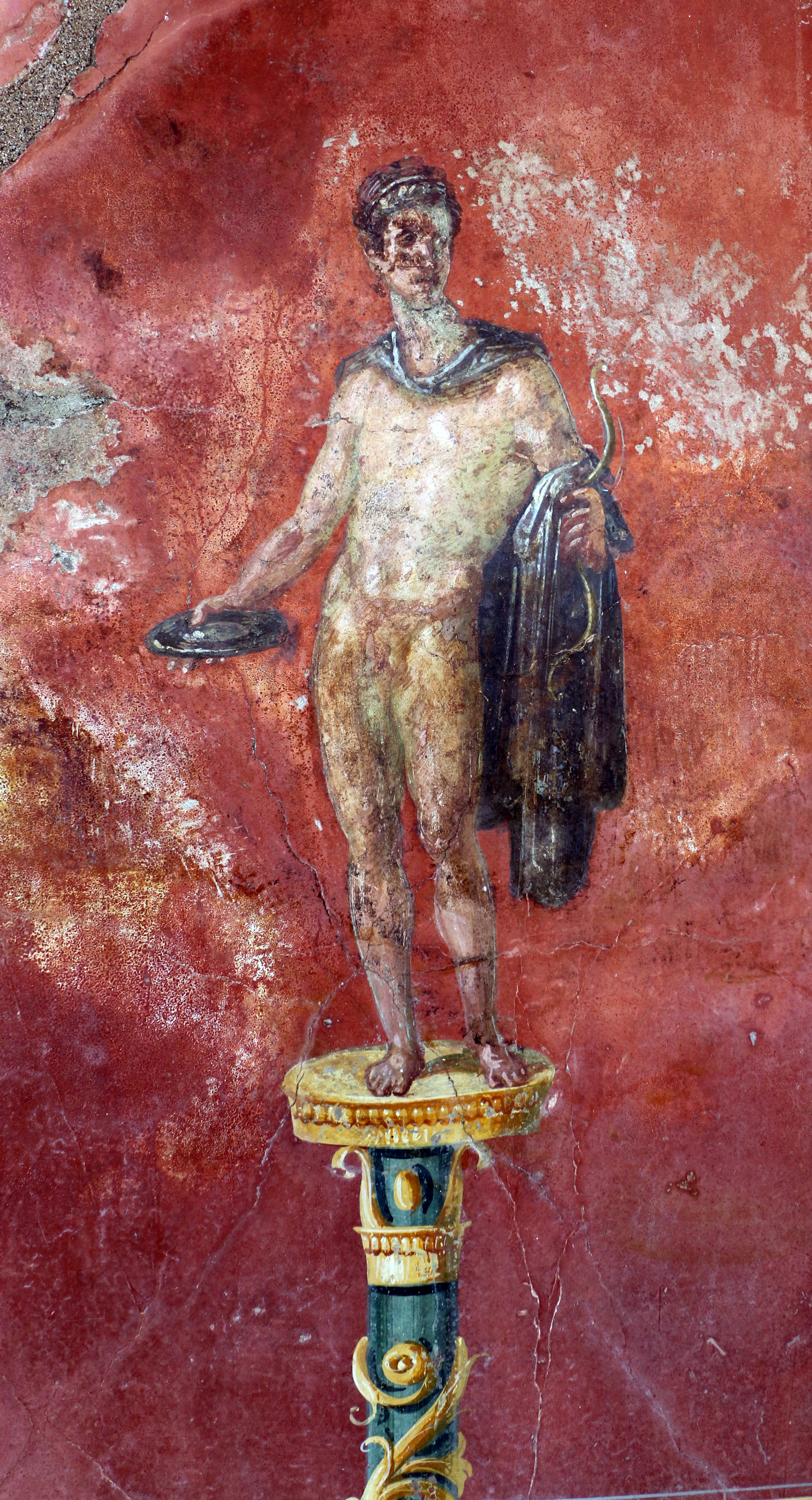
Apollo, fresco from Pompeii, 1st century AD

Apollo (Attic, Ionic, and Homeric Greek: Ἀπόλλων, Apollōn — Ἀπόλλωνος, Apóllōnos in the genitive); Doric: Ἀπέλλων, Apellōn; Arcadocypriot: Ἀπείλων, Apeilōn; Aeolic: Ἄπλουν, Aploun; Latin: Apollō)

The name Apollo—unlike Paean, the related older name—is generally not found in the Linear B (Mycenean Greek) texts, although there is a possible attestation in the lacunose form ]pe-rjo-[ (Linear B: ]𐀟𐁊-[) on the KN E 842 tablet, though it has also been suggested that the name might actually read "Hyperion" ([u]-pe-rjo-[ne]).

The etymology of the name is unclear. The spelling Ἀπόλλων (pronounced [a.pól.lɔːn] in Classical Attic) had almost superseded all other forms by the beginning of the common era, but the Doric form, Apellon (Ἀπέλλων), is more archaic, as it is derived from an earlier *Ἀπέλjων. It probably is a cognate to the Doric month Apellaios (Ἀπελλαῖος), and the offerings apellaia (ἀπελλαῖα) at the initiation of the young men during the family-festival apellai (ἀπέλλαι). According to some scholars, the words are derived from the Doric word apella (ἀπέλλα), which originally meant "wall", "fence for animals" and later "assembly within the limits of the square". Apella (Ἀπέλλα) is the name of the popular assembly in Sparta, corresponding to the ecclesia (ἐκκλησία). R. S. P. Beekes rejected the connection of the theonym with the noun apellai and suggested a Pre-Greek proto-form *Apal^{y}un.

Several instances of popular etymology are attested by ancient authors. Thus, the Greeks most often associated Apollo's name with the Greek verb ἀπόλλυμι (apollymi), "to destroy". Plato in Cratylus connects the name with ἀπόλυσις (apolysis), "redemption", with ἀπόλουσις (apolousis), "purification", and with ἁπλοῦν ([h]aploun), "simple", in particular in reference to the Thessalian form of the name, Ἄπλουν, and finally with Ἀειβάλλων (aeiballon), "ever-shooting". Hesychius connects the name Apollo with the Doric ἀπέλλα (apella), which means "assembly", so that Apollo would be the god of political life, and he also gives the explanation σηκός (sekos), "fold", in which case Apollo would be the god of flocks and herds. In the ancient Macedonian language πέλλα (pella) means "stone", and some toponyms may be derived from this word: Πέλλα (Pella, the capital of ancient Macedonia) and Πελλήνη (Pellēnē/Pellene).

The Hittite form Apaliunas (^{d}x-ap-pa-li-u-na-aš) is attested in the Manapa-Tarhunta letter. The Hittite testimony reflects an early form *Apeljōn, which may also be surmised from the comparison of Cypriot Ἀπείλων with Doric Ἀπέλλων. The name of the Lydian god Qλdãns /kʷʎðãns/ may reflect an earlier /kʷalyán-/ before palatalization, syncope, and the pre-Lydian sound change *y > d. Note the labiovelar in place of the labial /p/ found in pre-Doric Ἀπέλjων and Hittite Apaliunas. A Luwian etymology suggested for Apaliunas makes Apollo "The One of Entrapment", perhaps in the sense of "Hunter".

=== Greco-Roman epithets ===
Apollo's chief epithet was Phoebus (/ˈfiːbəs/ FEE-bəs; Φοῖβος, Phoibos Greek pronunciation: [pʰó͜i.bos]), literally "bright", and was very commonly used by both the Greeks and Romans. Like other Greek deities, he had a number of others applied to him, reflecting the variety of roles, duties, and aspects ascribed to the god. However, while Apollo has a great number of appellations in Greek myth, only a few occur in Latin literature.

==== Sun ====
- Aegletes (/əˈɡliːtiːz/ ə-GLEE-teez; Αἰγλήτης, Aiglētēs), from αἴγλη, "light of the Sun"
- Helius (/ˈhiːliəs/ HEE-lee-əs; Ἥλιος, Helios), literally "Sun"
- Lyceus (/laɪˈsiːəs/ ly-SEE-əs; Λύκειος, Lykeios, from Proto-Greek *λύκη), "light". The meaning of the epithet "Lyceus" later became associated with Apollo's mother Leto, who was the patron goddess of Lycia (Λυκία) and who was identified with the wolf (λύκος).
- Phanaeus (/fəˈniːəs/ fə-NEE-əs; Φαναῖος, Phanaios), literally "giving or bringing light"
- Phoebus (/ˈfiːbəs/ FEE-bəs; Φοῖβος, Phoibos), literally "bright", his most commonly used epithet by both the Greeks and Romans
- Sol (Roman) (/sɒl/), "Sun" in Latin

==== Wolf ====
- Lycegenes (/laɪˈsɛdʒəniːz/ ly-SEJ-ən-eez; Λυκηγενής, Lukēgenēs), literally "born of a wolf" or "born of Lycia"
- Lycoctonus (/laɪˈkɒktənəs/ ly-KOK-tə-nəs; Λυκοκτόνος, Lykoktonos), from λύκος, "wolf", and κτείνειν, "to kill"

==== Origin and birth ====
Apollo's birthplace was Mount Cynthus on the island of Delos.

- Cynthius (/ˈsɪnθiəs/ SIN-thee-əs; Κύνθιος, Kunthios), literally "Cynthian"
- Cynthogenes (/sɪnˈθɒdʒɪniːz/ sin-THOJ-in-eez; Κυνθογενής, Kynthogenēs), literally "born of Cynthus"
- Delius (/ˈdiːliəs/ DEE-lee-əs; Δήλιος, Delios), literally "Delian"
- Didymaeus (/ˌdɪdɪˈmiːəs/ DID-im-EE-əs; Διδυμαῖος, Didymaios) from δίδυμος, "twin", as the twin of Artemis

==== Place of worship ====
Delphi and Actium were his primary places of worship.

- Acraephius (/əˈkriːfiəs/ ə-KREE-fee-əs; Ἀκραίφιος, Akraiphios, literally "Acraephian") or Acraephiaeus (/əˌkriːfiˈiːəs/ ə-KREE-fee-EE-əs; Ἀκραιφιαίος, Akraiphiaios), "Acraephian", from the Boeotian town of Acraephia (Ἀκραιφία), reputedly founded by his son Acraepheus.
- Actiacus (/ækˈtaɪəkəs/ ak-TY-ə-kəs; Ἄκτιακός, Aktiakos), literally "Actian", after Actium (Ἄκτιον)
- Delphinius (/dɛlˈfɪniəs/ del-FIN-ee-əs; Δελφίνιος, Delphinios), literally "Delphic", after Delphi (Δελφοί). An etiology in the Homeric Hymns associated this with dolphins.
- Epactaeus, meaning "god worshipped on the coast", in Samos.
- Pythius (/ˈpɪθiəs/ PITH-ee-əs; Πύθιος, Puthios, from Πυθώ, Pythō), from the region around Delphi
- Smintheus (/ˈsmɪnθjuːs/ SMIN-thewss; Σμινθεύς, Smintheus), "Sminthian"—that is, "of the town of Sminthos or Sminthe" near the Troad town of Hamaxitus
- Napaian Apollo (Ἀπόλλων Ναπαῖος), from the city of Nape at the island of Lesbos
- Eutresites, from the city of Eutresis.

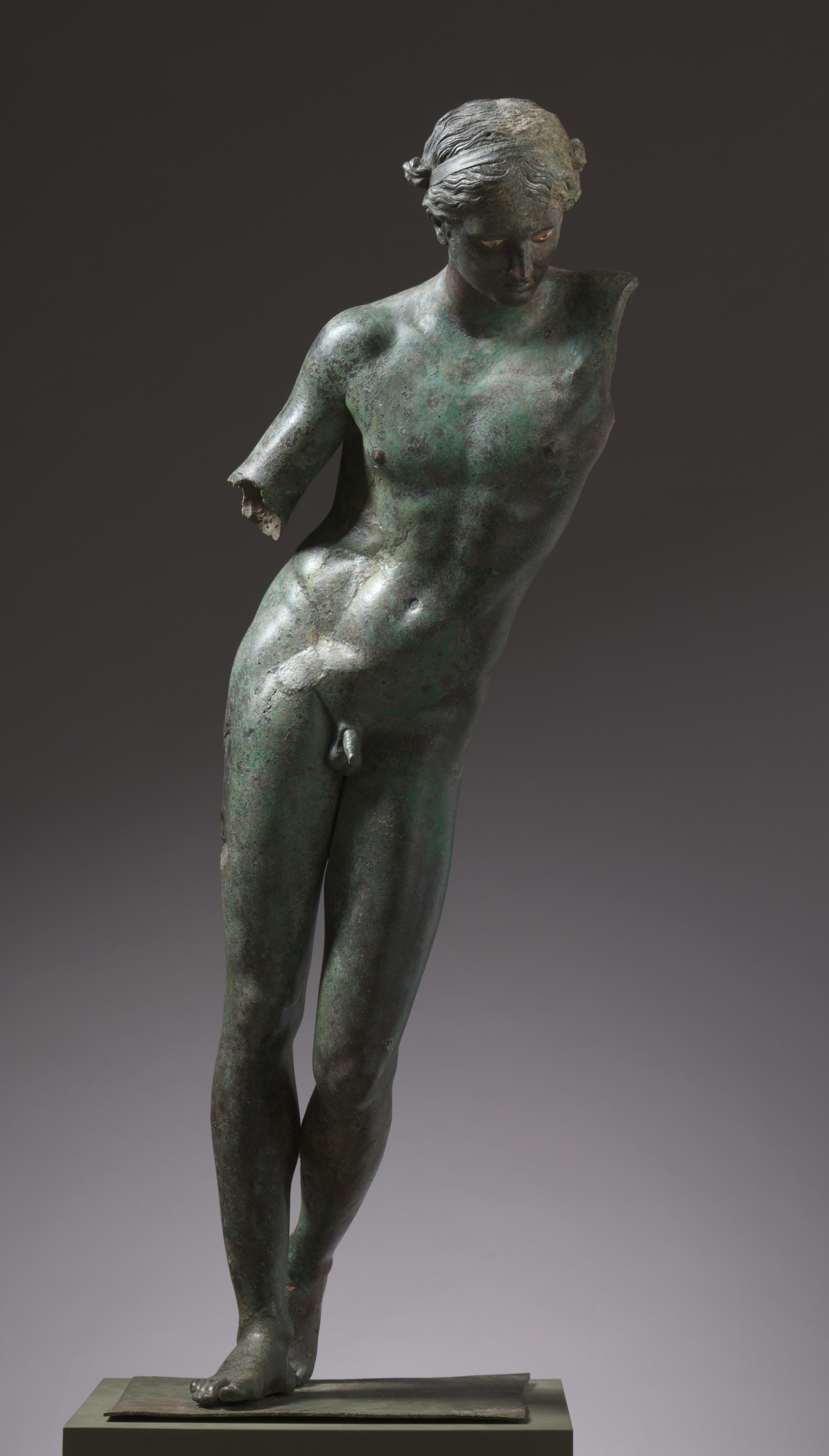
Statue of Apollo Sauroctonus attributed to Praxiteles c. 340 BC, Cleveland Museum of Art

- Ixios (Ἴξιος), derived from a district in Rhodes called Ixiae or Ixia.

==== Healing and disease ====
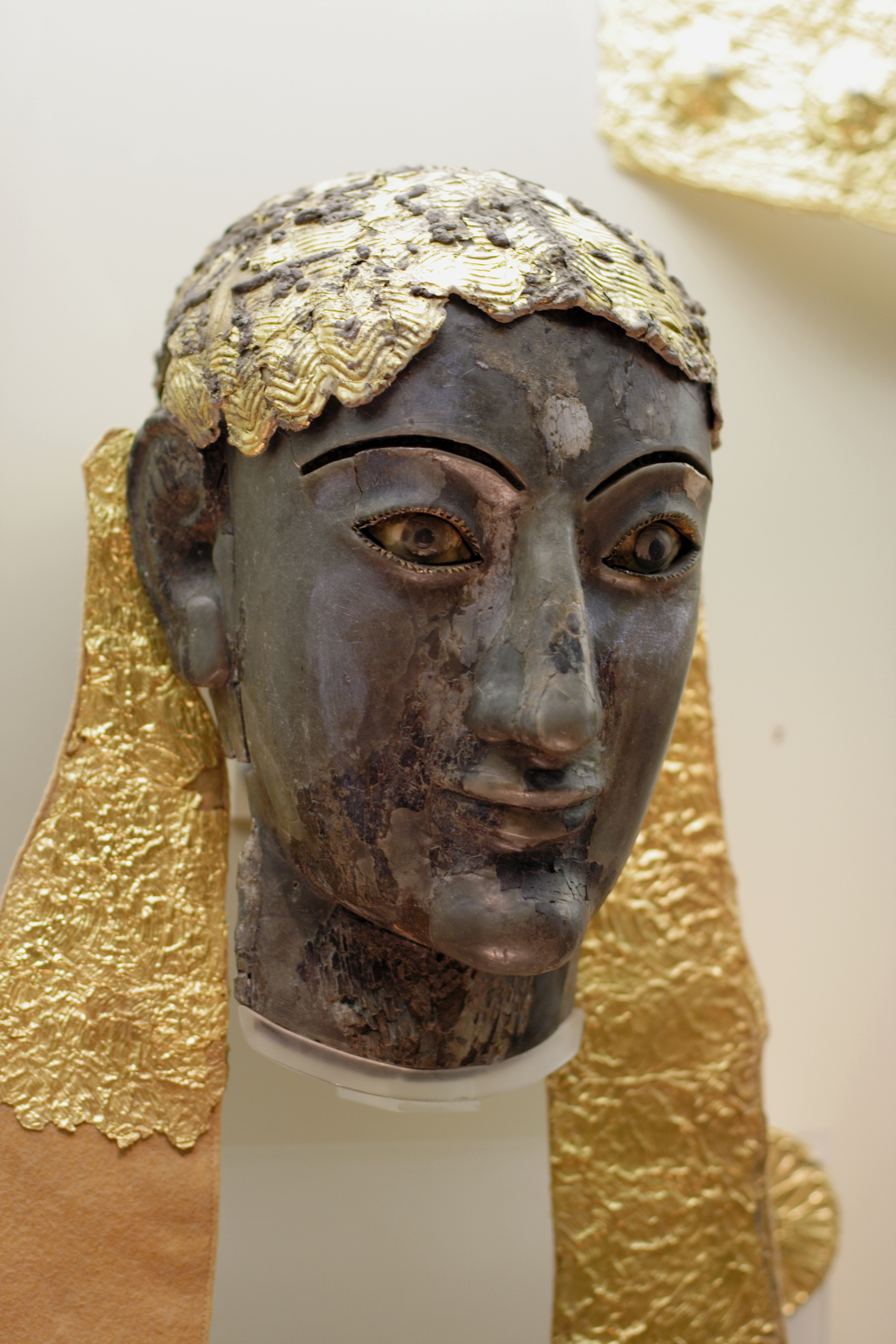
Chryselephantine statue of Apollo in Delphi, mid-6th century B.C.

- Acesius (/əˈsiːʒəs/ ə-SEE-zhəs; Ἀκέσιος, Akesios), from ἄκεσις, "healing". Acesius was the epithet of Apollo worshipped in Elis, where he had a temple in the agora.
- Acestor (/əˈsɛstər/ ə-SESS-tər; Ἀκέστωρ, Akestōr), literally "healer"
- Culicarius (Roman) (/ˌkjuːlɪˈkæriəs/ KEW-lih-KARR-ee-əs), from Latin culicārius, "of midges"
- Iatrus (/aɪˈætrəs/ eye-AT-rəs; Ἰατρός, Iātros), literally "physician"
- Medicus (Roman) (/ˈmɛdɪkəs/ MED-ik-əs), "physician" in Latin. A temple was dedicated to Apollo Medicus in Rome, probably next to the temple of Bellona.
- Paean (/ˈpiːən/ PEE-ən; Παιάν, Paiān), physician, healer
- Parnopius (/pɑːrˈnoʊpiəs/ par-NOH-pee-əs; Παρνόπιος, Parnopios), from πάρνοψ, "locust"

==== Founder and protector ====
- Agyieus (/əˈdʒaɪɪjuːs/ ə-JUY-ih-yooss; Ἀγυιεύς, Aguīeus), from ἄγυια, "street", for his role in protecting roads and homes
- Alexicacus (/əˌlɛksɪˈkeɪkəs/ ə-LEK-sih-KAY-kəs; Ἀλεξίκακος, Alexikakos), literally "warding off evil"
- Apotropaeus (/əˌpɒtrəˈpiːəs/ ə-POT-rə-PEE-əs; Ἀποτρόπαιος, Apotropaios), from ἀποτρέπειν, "to avert"
- Archegetes (/ɑːrˈkɛdʒətiːz/ ar-KEJ-ə-teez; Ἀρχηγέτης, Arkhēgetēs), literally "founder"
- Averruncus (Roman) (/ˌævəˈrʌŋkəs/ AV-ə-RUNG-kəs; from Latin āverruncare), "to avert"
- Clarius (/ˈklæriəs/ KLARR-ee-əs; Κλάριος, Klārios), from Doric κλάρος, "allotted lot"
- Epicurius (/ˌɛpɪˈkjʊəriəs/ EP-ih-KURE-ee-əs; Ἐπικούριος, Epikourios), from ἐπικουρέειν, "to aid"
- Genetor (/ˈdʒɛnɪtər/ JEN-ih-tər; Γενέτωρ, Genetōr), literally "ancestor"
- Nomius (/ˈnoʊmiəs/ NOH-mee-əs; Νόμιος, Nomios), literally "pastoral"
- Nymphegetes (/nɪmˈfɛdʒɪtiːz/ nim-FEJ-ih-teez; Νυμφηγέτης, Numphēgetēs), from Νύμφη, "Nymph", and ἡγέτης, "leader", for his role as a protector of shepherds and pastoral life
- Patroos (Πατρῷος, Patrōios) from πατρῷος, "related to one's father", for his role as father of Ion and founder of the Ionians, as worshipped at the Temple of Apollo Patroos in Athens
- Sauroctonus (Σαυροκτόνος, Sauroctonos), "lizard-killer", possibly a reference to his killing of Python

==== Prophecy and truth ====
- Coelispex (Roman) (/ˈsɛlɪspɛks/ SEL-isp-eks), from Latin coelum, "sky", and specere "to look at"
- Iatromantis (/aɪˌætrəˈmæntɪs/ eye-AT-rə-MAN-tis; Ἰατρομάντις, Iātromantis,) from ἰατρός, "physician", and μάντις, "prophet", referring to his role as a god both of healing and of prophecy
- Leschenorius (/ˌlɛskɪˈnɔːriəs/ LESS-kin-OR-ee-əs; Λεσχηνόριος, Leskhēnorios), from λεσχήνωρ, "converser"
- Loxias (/ˈlɒksiəs/ LOK-see-əs; Λοξίας, Loxias), from λέγειν, "to say", historically associated with λοξός, "ambiguous"
- Manticus (/ˈmæntɪkəs/ MAN-tik-əs; Μαντικός, Mantikos), literally "prophetic"
- Proopsios (Προόψιος), meaning "foreseer" or "first seen"

==== Music and arts ====
- Musagetes (/mjuːˈsædʒɪtiːz/ mew-SAJ-ih-teez; Doric Μουσαγέτας, Mousāgetās), from Μούσα, "Muse", and ἡγέτης "leader"
- Musegetes (/mjuːˈsɛdʒɪtiːz/ mew-SEJ-ih-teez; Μουσηγέτης, Mousēgetēs), as the preceding

==== Archery ====
- Aphetor (/əˈfiːtər/ ə-FEE-tər; Ἀφήτωρ, Aphētōr), from ἀφίημι, "to let loose"
- Aphetorus (/əˈfɛtərəs/ ə-FET-ər-əs; Ἀφητόρος, Aphētoros), as the preceding
- Arcitenens (Roman) (/ɑːrˈtɪsɪnənz/ ar-TISS-in-ənz), literally "bow-carrying"
- Argyrotoxus (/ˌɑːrdʒərəˈtɒksəs/ AR-jər-ə-TOK-səs; Ἀργυρότοξος, Argyrotoxos), literally "with silver bow"
- Clytotoxus (/ˌklaɪtɒˈtɒksəs/ KLY-toh-TOK-səs; Κλυτότοξος, Klytótoxos), "he who is famous for his bow", the renowned archer.
- Hecaërgus (/ˌhɛkiˈɜːrɡəs/ HEK-ee-UR-gəs; Ἑκάεργος, Hekaergos), literally "far-shooting"
- Hecebolus (/hɪˈsɛbələs/ hiss-EB-əl-əs; Ἑκηβόλος, Hekēbolos), "far-shooting"
- Ismenius (/ɪzˈmiːniəs/ iz-MEE-nee-əs; Ἰσμήνιος, Ismēnios), literally "of Ismenus", after Ismenus, the son of Amphion and Niobe, whom he struck with an arrow

==== Appearance ====
- Acersecomes (Ακερσεκόμης, Akersekómēs), "he who has unshorn hair", the eternal ephebe.
- Chrysocomes (/kraɪˈsɒkoʊməs/ cry-SOH-koh-miss; Χρυσοκόμης, Khrusokómēs), literally "he who has golden hair".

==== Amazons ====
- Amazonius (Ancient Greek: Ἀμαζόνιος), was, according to Pausanias in his Description of Greece, the name of a sanctuary of Apollo near Pyrrhichus, with an image of the god said to have been dedicated by the Amazons.

==== Other ====
- Boedromius (Βοηδρόμιος), was a surname of Apollo in Athens, with varying explanations for its origin. Some claim that the reason the god was given this name was because he had helped the Athenians overcome the Amazons in their battle, which took place on the seventh of Boedromion, the day the Boedromia were later commemorated. Others claim that the term originated from the fact that, in the battle between Eumolpus and Erechtheus and Ion, Apollo had counselled the Athenians to charge the enemy with a war cry (Βοή) if they were going to win.
- Pythaeus (Πυθαεύς; from Pythaeus, the son of Apollo), in Hermione (Argolis) there was a temple of Apollo called Pythaeus, a name they learned from the Argives because according to the poet Telesilla, they were the first Greeks to whose country came Pythaeus, the son of Apollo.
- Horios (Ὅριος; "of the borders"), it might be because the Hermionians won a victory, either in war or arbitration, related to the borders of their land, and therefore honored Apollo Horios.

=== Celtic epithets and cult titles ===
Apollo was worshipped throughout the Roman Empire. In the traditionally Celtic lands, he was most often seen as a healing and sun god. He was often equated with Celtic gods of similar character.

- Apollo Atepomarus ("the great horseman" or "possessing a great horse"). Apollo was worshipped at Mauvières (Indre). Horses were, in the Celtic world, closely linked to the Sun.
- Apollo Belenus ("bright" or "brilliant"). This epithet was given to Apollo in parts of Gaul, Northern Italy and Noricum (part of modern Austria). Apollo Belenus was a healing and sun god.
- Apollo Cunomaglus ("hound lord"). A title given to Apollo at a shrine at Nettleton Shrub, Wiltshire. May have been a god of healing. Cunomaglus himself may originally have been an independent healing god.
- Apollo Grannus. Grannus was a healing spring god, later equated with Apollo.
- Apollo Maponus. A god known from inscriptions in Britain. This may be a local fusion of Apollo and Maponus.
- Apollo Moritasgus ("masses of sea water"). An epithet for Apollo at Alesia, where he was worshipped as the god of healing and, possibly, of physicians.
- Apollo Vindonnus ("clear light"). Apollo Vindonnus had a temple at Essarois, near Châtillon-sur-Seine in present-day Burgundy. He was a god of healing, especially of the eyes.
- Apollo Virotutis ("benefactor of mankind"). Apollo Virotutis was worshipped, among other places, at Fins d'Annecy (Haute-Savoie) and at Jublains (Maine-et-Loire).

== Origins ==
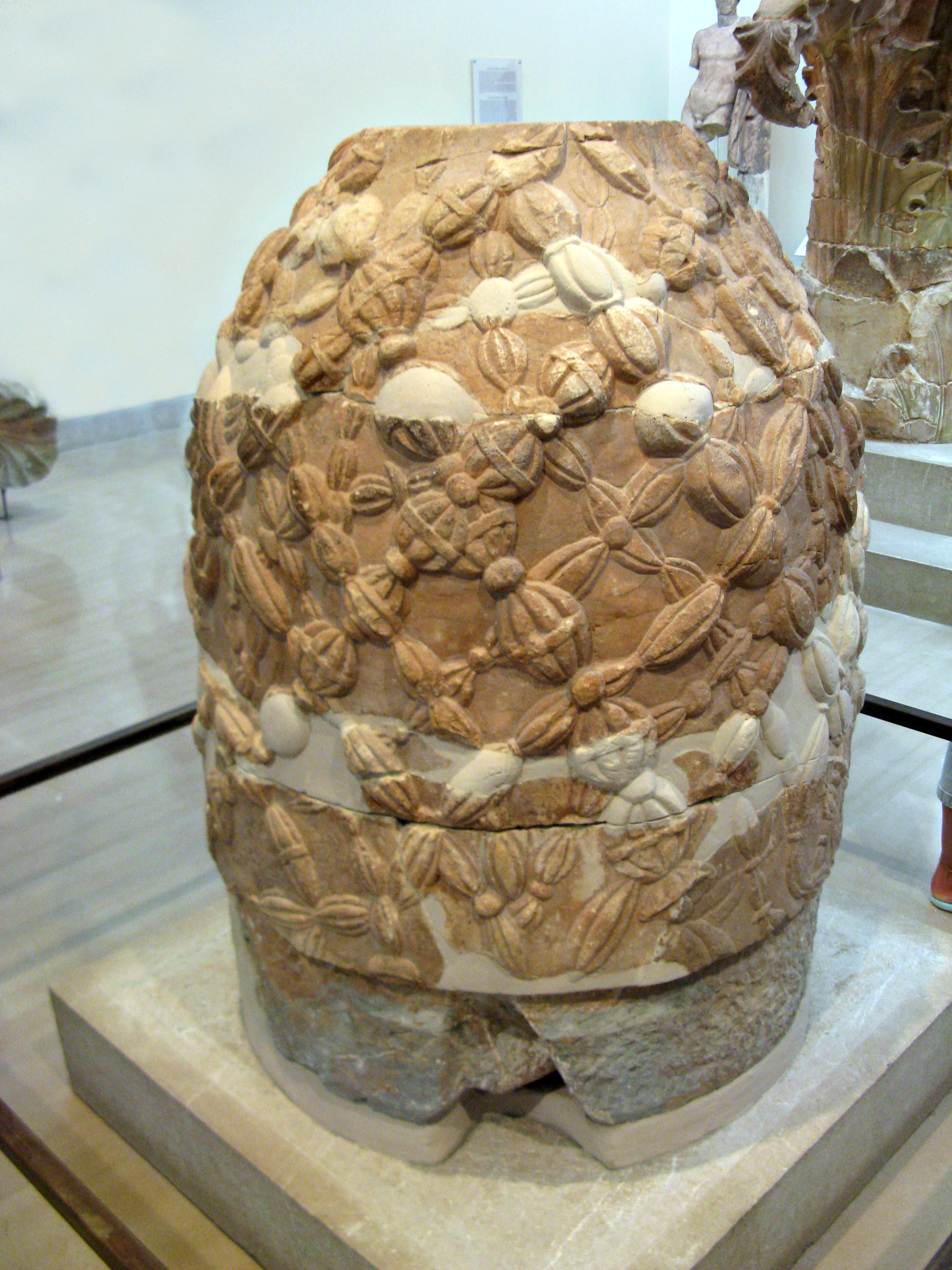
Omphalos in the Museum of Delphi

Apollo was one of the principal deities of the Greek pantheon and was regarded by the Greeks as among the most characteristically Greek of the gods. Some scholars have likewise described him as the most Greek of the Olympian gods, and over the centuries his cult acquired a wide range of religious functions. In Greek mythology, he was the son of Zeus and Leto and the twin brother of Artemis.

The major cult centres of Apollo, especially Delphi and Delos, date from the 8th century BC. The Delian sanctuary was closely associated with Artemis, while at Delphi Apollo was venerated as the slayer of the monstrous serpent Python and as the god of the Delphic oracle. Through these sanctuaries, Apollo became one of the most important Panhellenic deities. In Archaic Greece, he was especially prominent as a prophetic and oracular god, with older associations with healing. In Classical Greece, he was increasingly associated with light and music, while in popular religion he retained an important apotropaic function, protecting worshippers from evil.

The obscure prehistory of Apollo's worship has led scholars to propose several explanations for his development. Walter Burkert discerned three components in the prehistory of Apollo worship, which he termed "a Dorian-northwest Greek component, a Cretan-Minoan component, and a Syro-Hittite component". These interpretations do not describe Apollo as a foreign god adopted by the Greeks. Rather, they present him as a fully Greek and Greek religious deity whose historical form may have incorporated some earlier pre-Greek, Aegean, Asia Minor religious elements.

=== Dorian connections ===
The Homeric Hymn to Apollo depicts Apollo as an intruder from the north. The connection with the northern-dwelling Dorians and their initiation festival apellai is reinforced by the month Apellaios in northwest Greek calendars. The family-festival was dedicated to Apollo (Doric: Ἀπέλλων). Apellaios is the month of these rites, and Apellon is the "megistos kouros" (the great Kouros). However it can explain only the Doric type of the name, which is connected with the Ancient Macedonian word "pella" (Pella), stone. Stones played an important part in the cult of the god, especially in the oracular shrine of Delphi (Omphalos).

=== Minoan connections ===
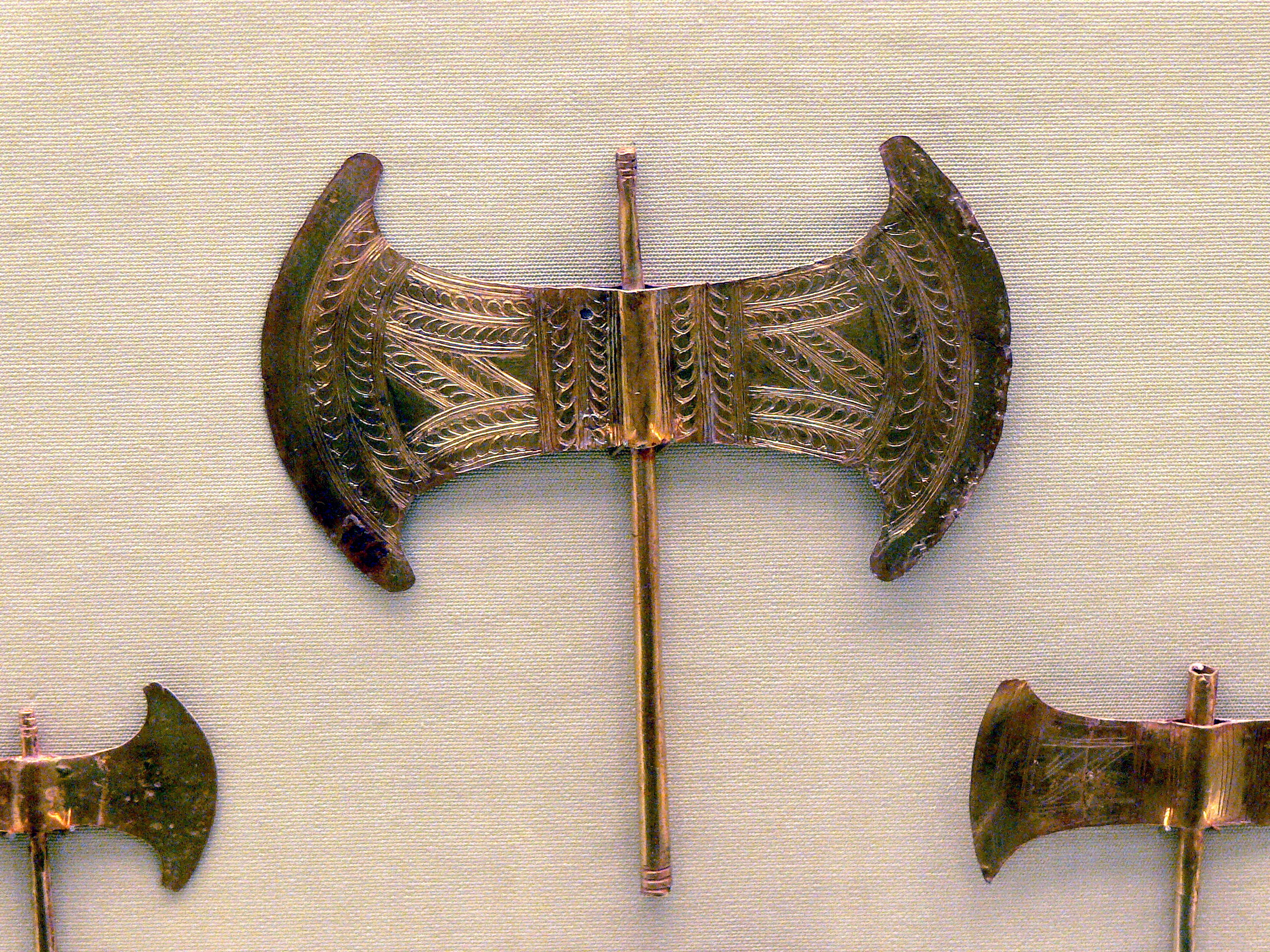
Ornamented golden Minoan labrys

George Huxley considered the identification of Apollo with the Minoan deity Paiawon, worshipped in Crete, to have originated at Delphi. In the Homeric Hymn, Apollo appears as a dolphin carrying Cretan priests to Delphi, to which site they evidently transfer their religious practices. Apollo Delphinios or Delphidios was a sea-god worshipped especially in Crete and in the islands.

Apollo's twin sister Artemis, who was the Greek goddess of hunting, is identified with the Minoan goddess Britomartis (Diktynna), and with Laphria the Pre-Greek "mistress of the animals" who was specially worshipped at Delphi. In her earliest depictions she was accompanied by the "Master of the animals", a bow-wielding god of hunting whose name has been lost; aspects of this figure may have been absorbed into the more popular Apollo. A family of priests at Delphi was named "Lab(r)yaden". The name may derive from Laphria.

=== Asia Minor connections ===
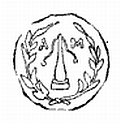
Illustration of a coin of Apollo Agyieus from Ambracia

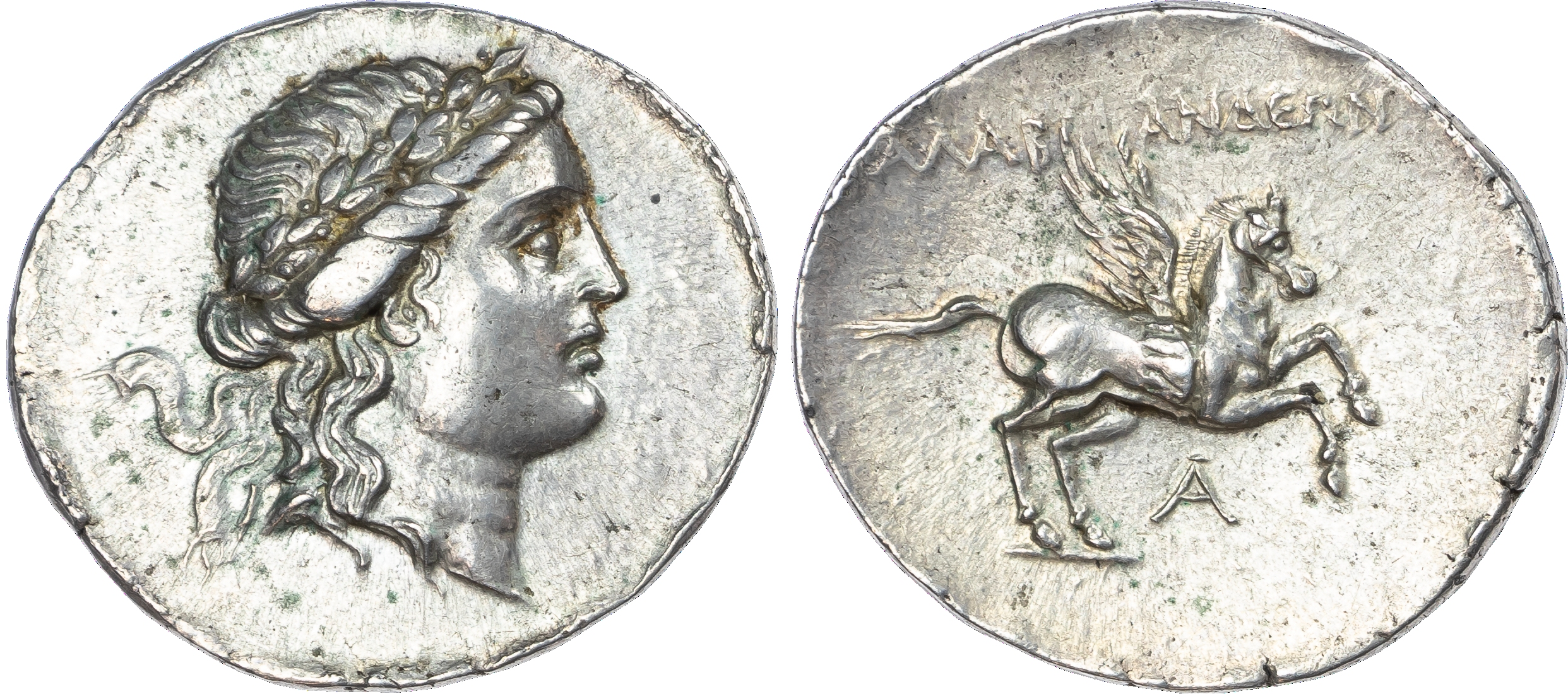
Silver tetradrachm of Alabanda issued 167 BC, depicting Apollo and Pegasus

Possible Anatolian or broader Asia Minor elements in the formation of Apollo's cult have been discussed in scholarship. Apollo's mother Leto was associated with earlier deities of Asia Minor, and some scholars have connected aspects of Apollo's oracular, healing, purificatory, and apotropaic functions with Anatolian or Near Eastern traditions.

Apollo was associated with the Trojan side during the Trojan War. He has also been compared with Appaliunas, a deity associated with Wilusa in Asia Minor, although the evidence is fragmentary and the identification remains debated. Other proposed parallels, including Lydian divine names and the celebration of Apollo's festivals on the seventh day of the month, have also been interpreted as possible eastern connections, but remain uncertain.

=== Healer and god-protector from evil ===
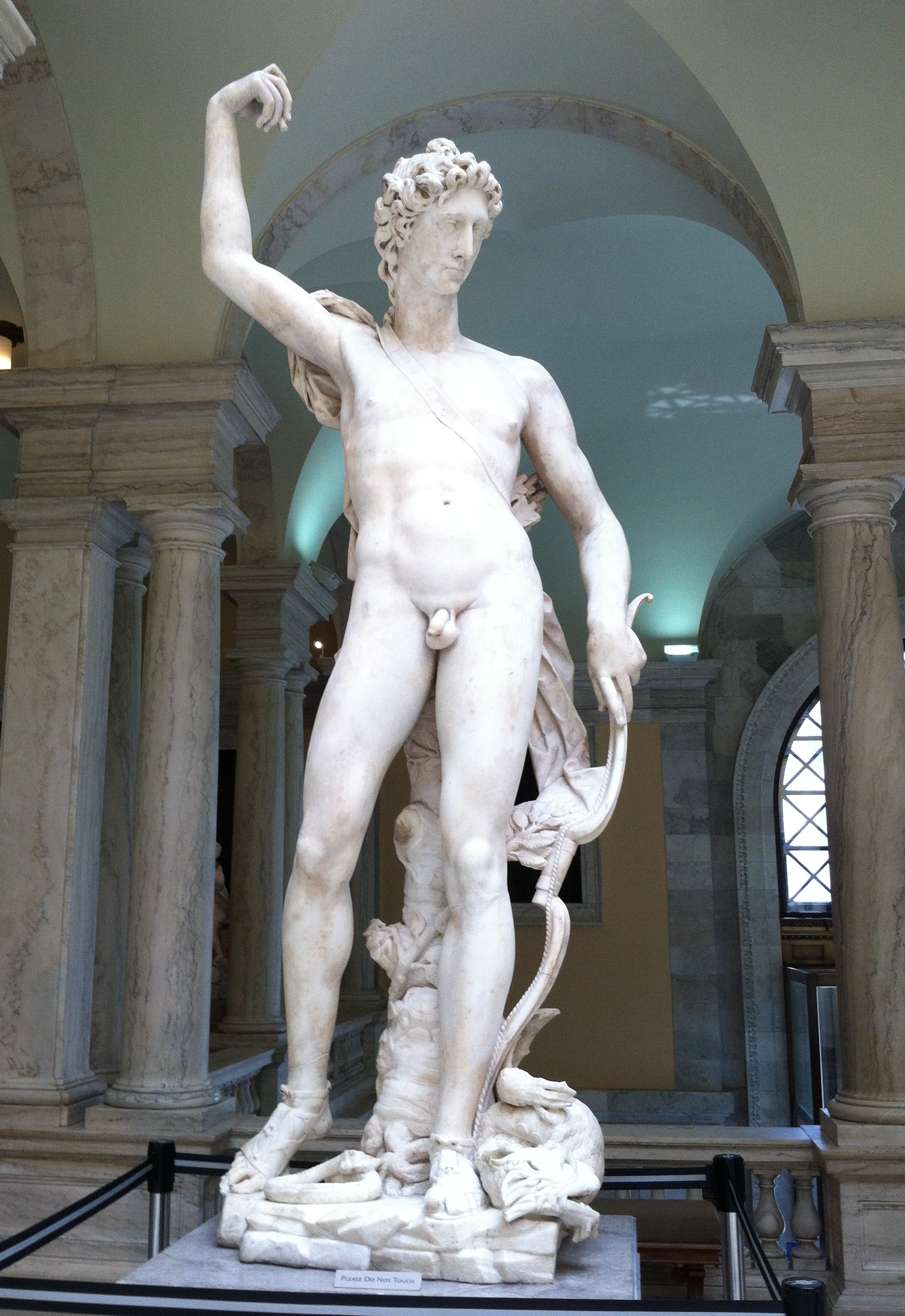
Apollo Victorious over the Python by Pietro Francavilla (1591), depicting Apollo's victory over the serpent Python (The Walters Art Museum)

In classical times, his major function in popular religion was to keep away evil, and he was therefore called "apotropaios" (ἀποτρόπαιος, "averting evil") and "alexikakos" (ἀλεξίκακος, "keeping off ill"; from v. ἀλέξω + n. κακόν). Apollo also had many epithets relating to his function as a healer. Some commonly used examples are "paion" (παιών, literally "healer" or "helper") "epikourios" (ἐπικούριος, "succouring"), "oulios" (οὔλιος, "healer, baleful") and "loimios" (λοίμιος, "of the plague"). In later writers, the word "paion", usually spelled "Paean", becomes a mere epithet of Apollo in his capacity as a god of healing.

Apollo in his aspect of "healer" has a connection to the primitive god Paean (Παιών-Παιήων), who did not have a cult of his own. Paean serves as the healer of the gods in the Iliad, and seems to have originated in a pre-Greek religion. It is suggested, though unconfirmed, that he is connected to the Mycenaean figure pa-ja-wo-ne (Linear B: 𐀞𐀊𐀺𐀚). Paean was the personification of holy songs sung by "seer-doctors" (ἰατρομάντεις), which were supposed to cure disease.

Homer uses the noun Paeon to designate both a god and that god's characteristic song of apotropaic thanksgiving and triumph. Such songs were originally addressed to Apollo and afterwards to other gods: to Dionysus, to Apollo Helios, to Apollo's son Asclepius the healer. About the 4th century BC, the paean became merely a formula of adulation; its object was either to implore protection against disease and misfortune or to offer thanks after such protection had been rendered. It was in this way that Apollo had become recognized as the god of music. Apollo's role as the slayer of the Python led to his association with battle and victory; hence it became the Roman custom for a paean to be sung by an army on the march and before entering into battle, when a fleet left the harbour, and after a victory had been won.

In the Iliad, Apollo is the healer under the gods, but he is also the bringer of disease and death with his arrows, similar to the function of the Vedic god of disease Rudra. He sends a plague (λοιμός) to the Achaeans, in anger at Agamemnon, the commander-in-chief of the expedition, having refused to ransom Chryseis, the daughter of Chryses, one of his Trojan priests. Knowing that Apollo can prevent a recurrence of the plague he sent, they purify themselves in a ritual and offer him a large sacrifice of cows, called a hecatomb.

== Oracular cult ==
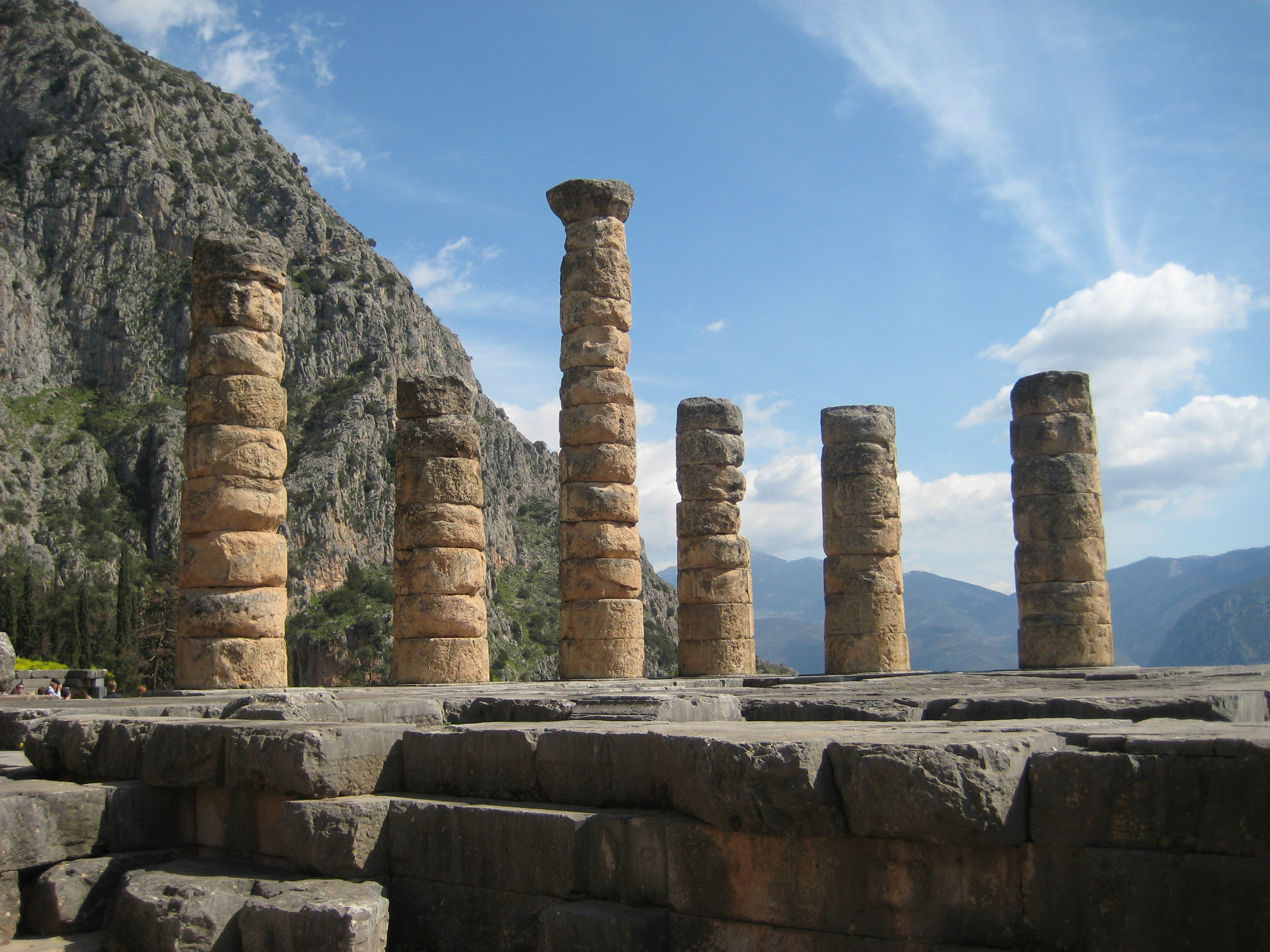
Columns of the Temple of Apollo at Delphi, Greece

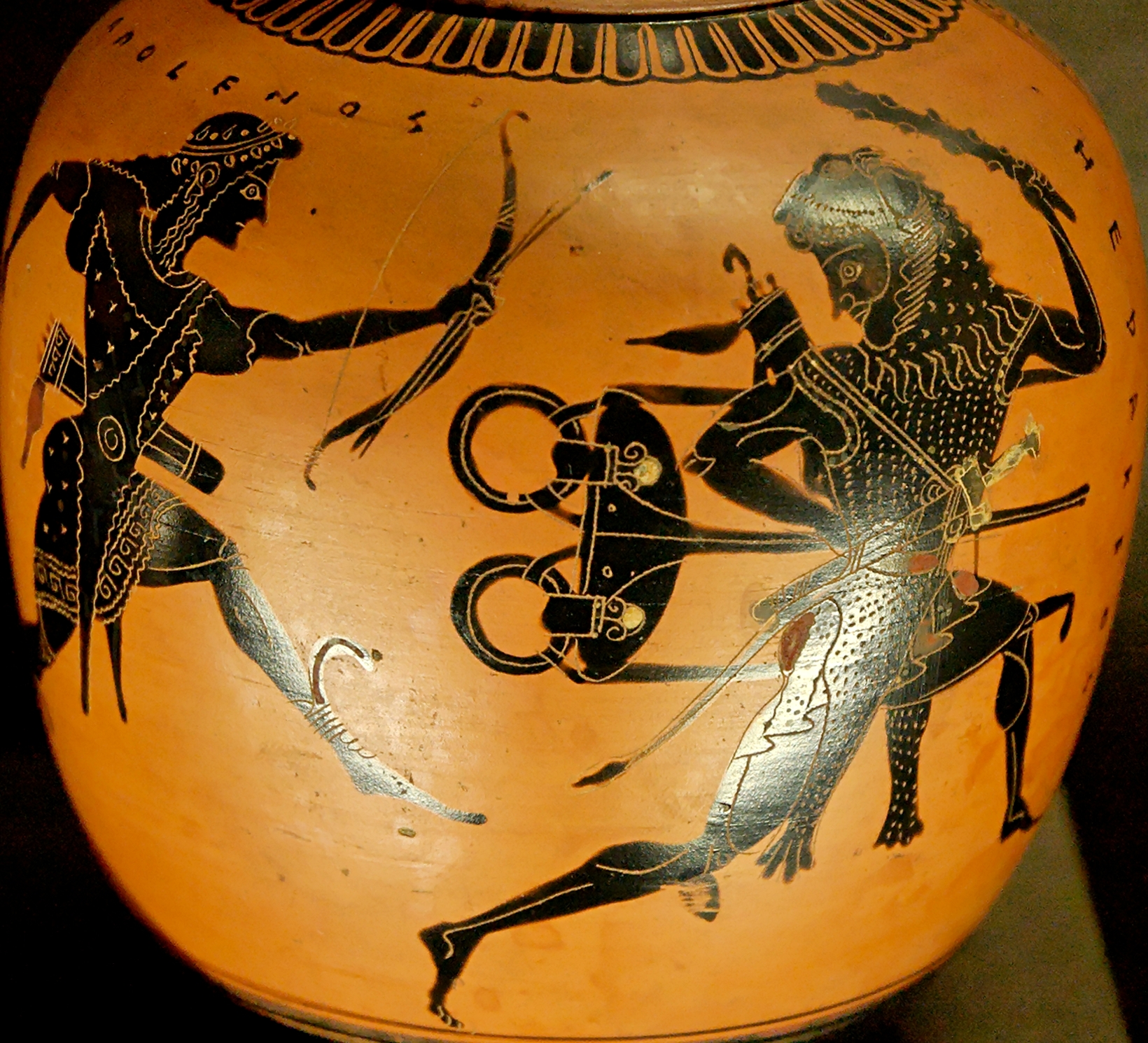
Oracular tripod

Unusually among the Olympic deities, Apollo had two cult sites that had widespread influence: Delos and Delphi. In cult practice, Delian Apollo and Pythian Apollo (the Apollo of Delphi) were so distinct that they might both have shrines in the same locality. Lycia was sacred to the god, for this Apollo was also called Lycian. Apollo's cult was already fully established when written sources commenced, about 650 BC. Apollo became extremely important to the Greek world as an oracular deity in the archaic period, and the frequency of theophoric names such as Apollodorus or Apollonios, and cities named Apollonia testify to his popularity. Oracular sanctuaries to Apollo were established in other sites. In the 2nd and 3rd century AD, those at Didyma and Claros pronounced the so-called "theological oracles", in which Apollo confirms that all deities are aspects or servants of an all-encompassing, highest deity. "In the 3rd century, Apollo fell silent. Julian the Apostate (reigned 361–363 AD) tried to revive the Delphic oracle, but failed."

=== Oracular shrines ===
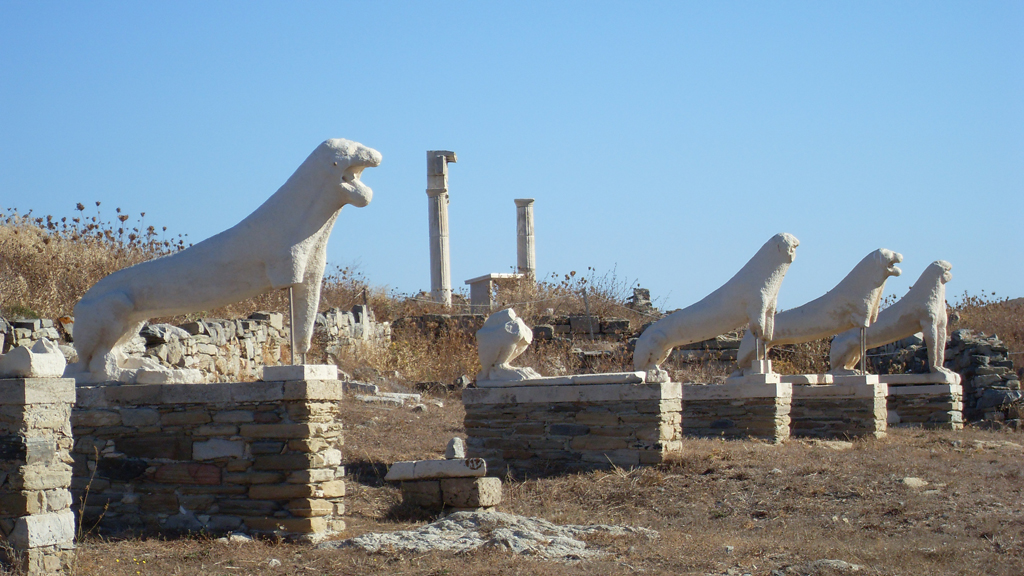
Delos lions

Apollo had a famous oracle in Delphi, and other notable ones in Claros and Didyma. His oracular shrine in Abae in Phocis, where he bore the toponymic epithet Abaeus (Ἀπόλλων Ἀβαῖος, Apollon Abaios), was important enough to be consulted by Croesus. His oracular shrines include:

- Abae in Phocis.
- Bassae in the Peloponnese.
- At Clarus, on the west coast of Asia Minor; as at Delphi a holy spring which gave off a pneuma, from which the priests drank.
- In Corinth, the Oracle of Corinth came from the town of Tenea, from prisoners supposedly taken in the Trojan War.
- At Khyrse, in Troad, the temple was built for Apollo Smintheus.
- In Delos, there was an oracle to the Delian Apollo, during summer. The Hieron (Sanctuary) of Apollo adjacent to the Sacred Lake, was the place where the god was said to have been born.
- In Delphi, the Pythia became filled with the pneuma of Apollo, said to come from a spring inside the Adyton.
- In Didyma, an oracle on the coast of Anatolia, south west of Lydian (Luwian) Sardis, in which priests from the lineage of the Branchidae received inspiration by drinking from a healing spring located in the temple. Was believed to have been founded by Branchus, son or lover of Apollo.
- In Hierapolis Bambyce, Syria (modern Manbij), according to the treatise De Dea Syria, the sanctuary of the Syrian Goddess contained a robed and bearded image of Apollo. Divination was based on spontaneous movements of this image.
- At Patara, in Lycia, there was a seasonal winter oracle of Apollo, said to have been the place where the god went from Delos. As at Delphi the oracle at Patara was a woman.
- In Segesta in Sicily.

Oracles were also given by sons of Apollo.

- In Oropus, north of Athens, the oracle Amphiaraus, was said to be the son of Apollo; Oropus also had a sacred spring.
- in Labadea, 20 miles (32 km) east of Delphi, Trophonius, another son of Apollo, killed his brother and fled to the cave where he was also afterwards consulted as an oracle.

== Temples of Apollo ==
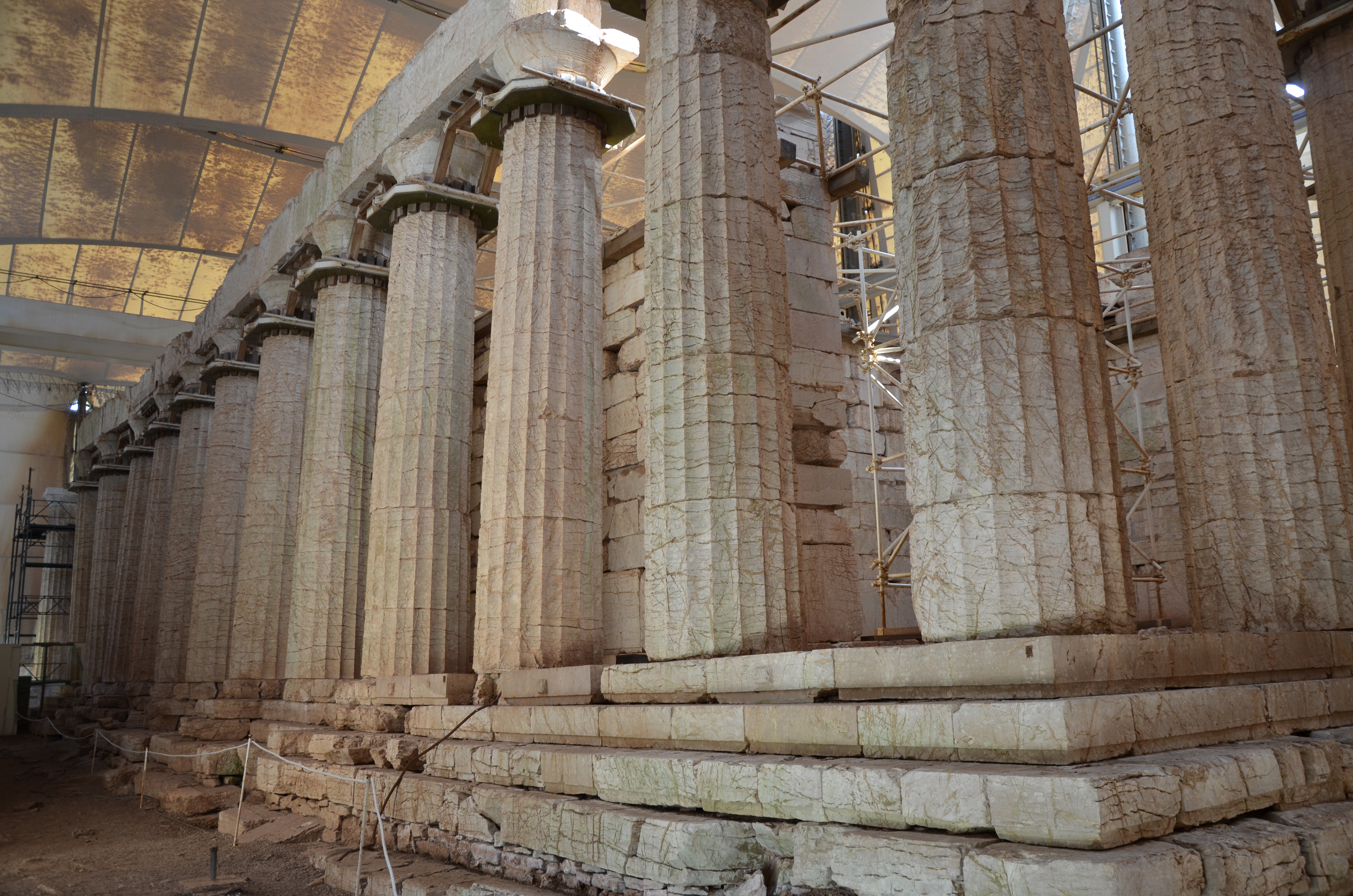
Partial view of the temple of Apollo Epikurios (healer) at Bassae in southern Greece

Many temples were dedicated to Apollo in Greece and its colonies. They show the spread of the cult of Apollo and the evolution of Greek architecture, which was mostly based on the rightness of form and on mathematical relations. Some of the earliest temples, especially in Crete, do not belong to any Greek order. It seems that the first peripteral temples were rectangular wooden structures. The different wooden elements were considered divine, and their forms were preserved in the marble or stone elements of the temples of Doric order. The Greeks used standard types because they believed that the world of objects was a series of typical forms which could be represented in several instances. The temples should be canonic, and the architects were trying to achieve this esthetic perfection. From the earliest times there were certain rules strictly observed in rectangular peripteral and prostyle buildings. The first buildings were built narrowly in order to hold the roof, and when the dimensions changed some mathematical relations became necessary in order to keep the original forms. This probably influenced the theory of numbers of Pythagoras, who believed that behind the appearance of things there was the permanent principle of mathematics.

The Doric order dominated during the 6th and the 5th century BC but there was a mathematical problem regarding the position of the triglyphs, which could not be solved without changing the original forms. The order was almost abandoned for the Ionic order, but the Ionic capital also posed an insoluble problem at the corner of a temple. Both orders were abandoned for the Corinthian order gradually during the Hellenistic age and under Rome.

=== Greek temples ===
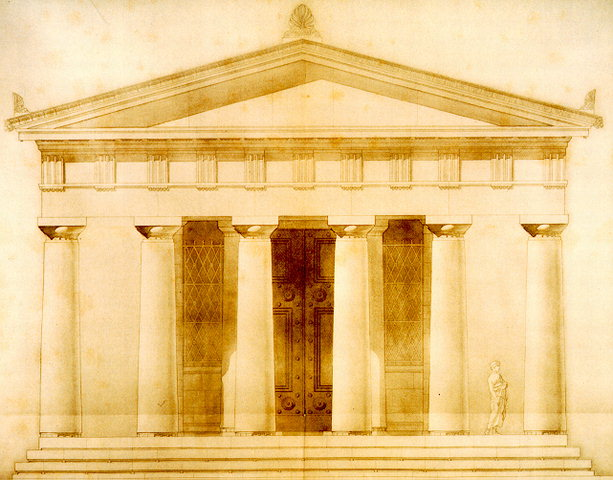
Temple of the Delians at Delos, dedicated to Apollo (478 BC), 19th-century pen-and-wash restoration

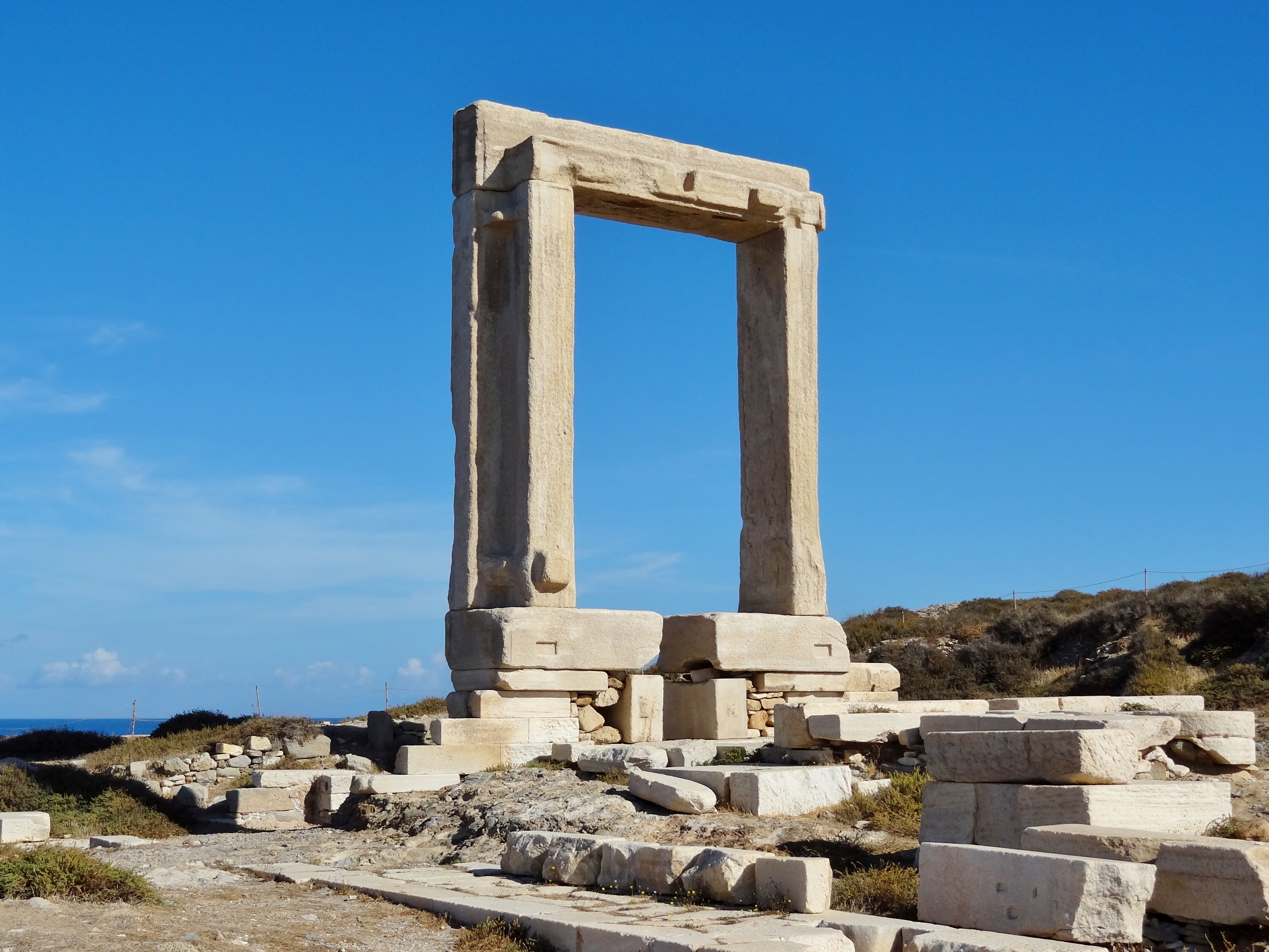
Gate at the Temple of Apollo (Naxos)

- Thebes, Greece: The oldest temple probably dedicated to Apollo Ismenius was built in the 9th century BC. It seems that it was a curvilinear building. The Doric temple was built in the early 7th century BC, but only some small parts have been found. A festival called Daphnephoria was celebrated every ninth year in honour of Apollo Ismenius (or Galaxius). The people held laurel branches (daphnai), and at the head of the procession walked a youth (chosen priest of Apollo), who was called "daphnephoros".
- Eretria: According to the Homeric hymn to Apollo, the god arrived on the plain, seeking for a location to establish its oracle. The first temple of Apollo Daphnephoros, "Apollo, laurel-bearer", or "carrying off Daphne", is dated to 800 BC. The temple was curvilinear hecatombedon (a hundred feet). In a smaller building were kept the bases of the laurel branches which were used for the first building. Another temple probably peripteral was built in the 7th century BC, with an inner row of wooden columns over its Geometric predecessor. It was rebuilt peripteral around 510 BC, with the stylobate measuring 21.00 x 43.00 m. The number of pteron column was 6 x 14.
- Dreros (Crete). The temple of Apollo Delphinios dates from the 7th century BC, or probably from the middle of the 8th century BC. According to the legend, Apollo appeared as a dolphin, and carried Cretan priests to the port of Delphi. The dimensions of the plan are 10.70 x 24.00 m and the building was not peripteral. It contains column-bases of the Minoan type, which may be considered as the predecessors of the Doric columns.
- Gortyn (Crete). A temple of Pythian Apollo, was built in the 7th century BC. The plan measured 19.00 x 16.70 m and it was not peripteral. The walls were solid and made from limestone. There was a single door on the east side.
- Thermon (West Greece): The Doric temple of Apollo Thermios, was built in the middle of the 7th century BC. It was built on an older curvilinear building dating perhaps from the 10th century, on which a peristyle was added. The temple was narrow, and the number of pteron columns (probably wooden) was 5 x 15. There was a single row of inner columns. It measures 12.13 x 38.23 m at the stylobate, which was made from stones.

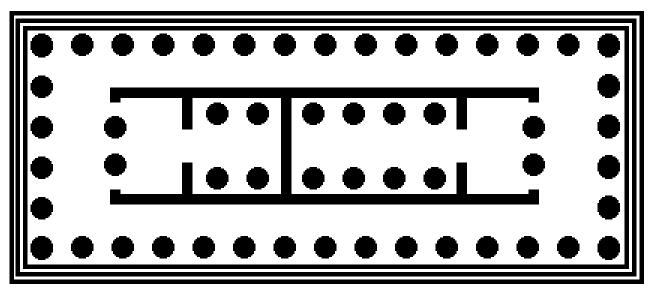
Floor plan of the temple of Apollo, Corinth

- Corinth: A Doric temple was built in the 6th century BC. The temple's stylobate measures 21.36 x 53.30 m, and the number of pteron columns was 6 x 15. There was a double row of inner columns. The style is similar to the Temple of Alcmeonidae at Delphi. The Corinthians were considered to be the inventors of the Doric order.
- Napes (Lesbos): An Aeolic temple probably of Apollo Napaios was built in the 7th century BC. Some special capitals with floral ornament have been found, which are called Aeolic, and they seem to have been borrowed from the East.
- Cyrene, Libya: The oldest Doric temple of Apollo was built in c. 600 BC. The number of pteron columns was 6 x 11, and it measures 16.75 x 30.05 m at the stylobate. There was a double row of sixteen inner columns on stylobates. The capitals were made from stone.

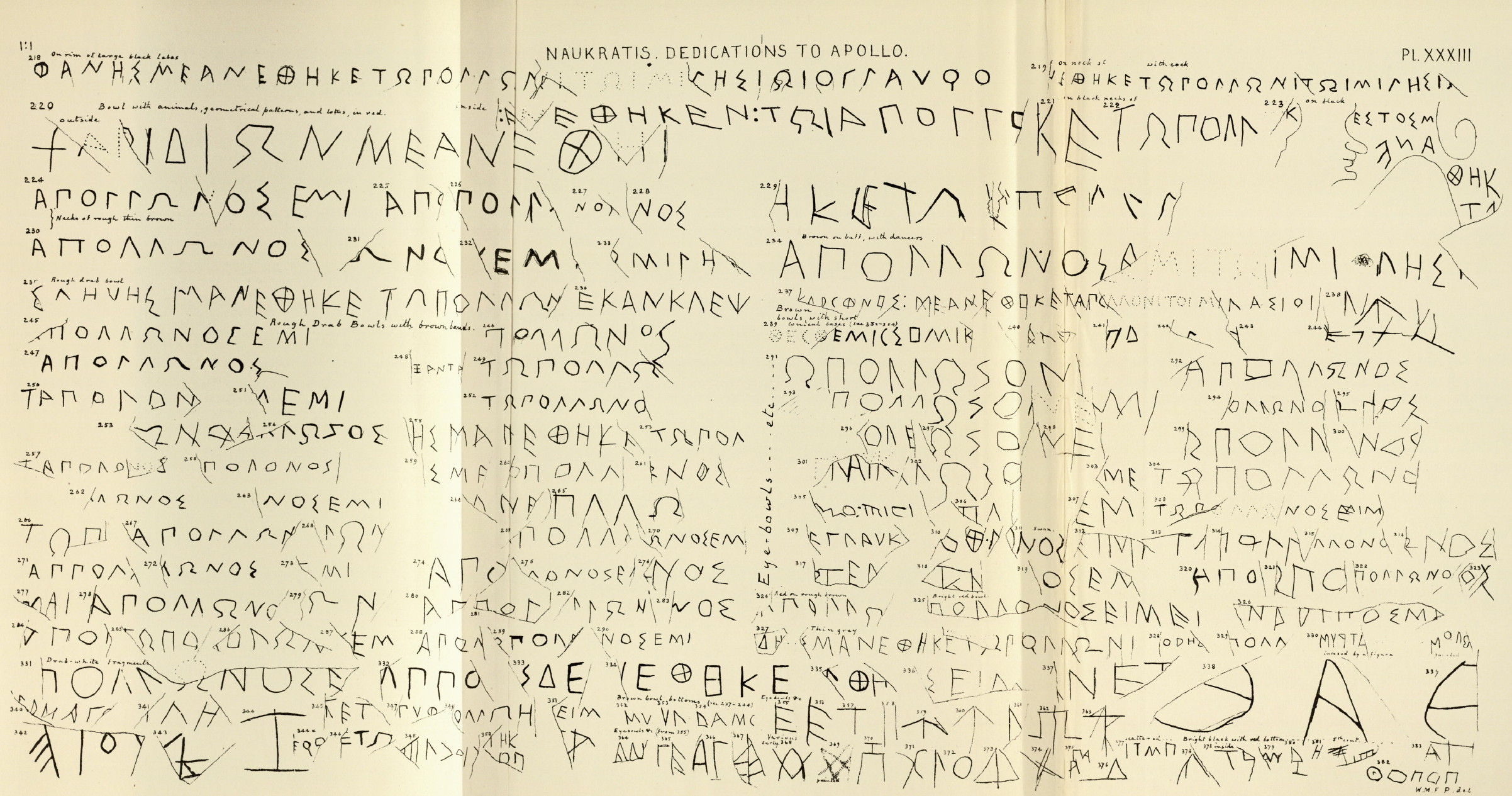
Inscriptions for Apollo, Naukratis

- Naukratis: An Ionic temple was built in the early 6th century BC. Only some fragments have been found and the earlier ones, made from limestone, are identified among the oldest of the Ionic order.

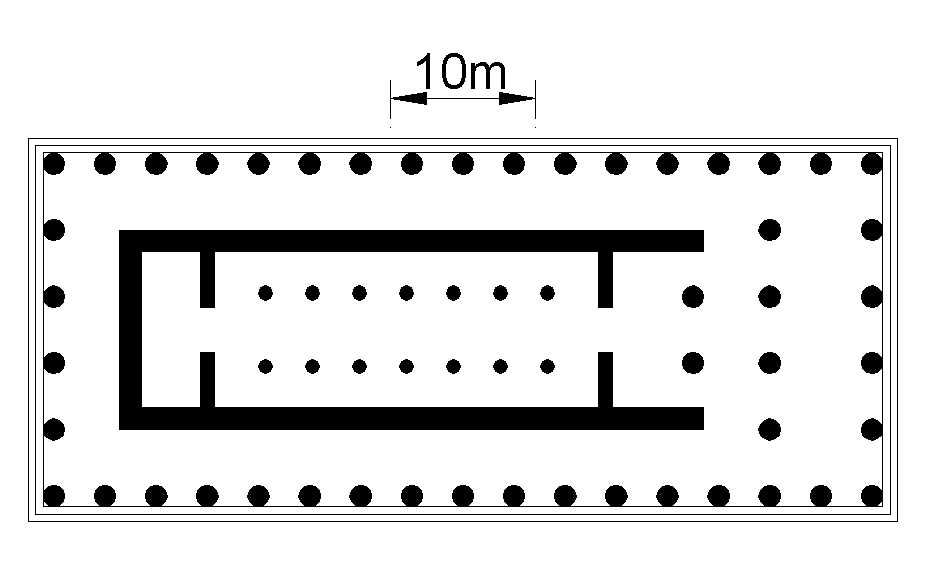
Floor plan of the temple of Apollo, Syracuse

- Syracuse, Sicily: A Doric temple was built at the beginning of the 6th century BC. The temple's stylobate measures 21.47 x 55.36 m and the number of pteron columns was 6 x 17. It was the first temple in Greek west built completely out of stone. A second row of columns were added, obtaining the effect of an inner porch.
- Selinus (Sicily):The Doric Temple C dates from 550 BC, and it was probably dedicated to Apollo. The temple's stylobate measures 10.48 x 41.63 m and the number of pteron columns was 6 x 17. There was a portico with a second row of columns, which is also attested for the temple at Syracuse.
- Delphi: The first temple dedicated to Apollo, was built in the 7th century BC. According to the legend, it was wooden made of laurel branches. The "Temple of Alcmeonidae" was built in c. 513 BC and it is the oldest Doric temple with significant marble elements. The temple's stylobate measures 21.65 x 58.00 m, and the number of pteron columns as 6 x 15. A fest similar to Apollo's fest at Thebes, Greece was celebrated every nine years. A boy was sent to the temple, who walked on the sacred road and returned carrying a laurel branch (dopnephoros). The maidens participated with joyful songs.
- Chios: An Ionic temple of Apollo Phanaios was built at the end of the 6th century BC. Only some small parts have been found and the capitals had floral ornament.
- Abae (Phocis). The temple was destroyed by the Persians in the invasion of Xerxes in 480 BC, and later by the Boeotians. It was rebuilt by Hadrian. The oracle was in use from early Mycenaean times to the Roman period, and shows the continuity of Mycenaean and Classical Greek religion.
- Bassae (Peloponnesus): A temple dedicated to Apollo Epikourios ("Apollo the helper"), was built in 430 BC, designed by Iktinos. It combined Doric and Ionic elements, and the earliest use of a column with a Corinthian capital in the middle. The temple is of a relatively modest size, with the stylobate measuring 14.5 x 38.3 metres containing a Doric peristyle of 6 x 15 columns. The roof left a central space open to admit light and air.
- Delos: A temple probably dedicated to Apollo and not peripteral, was built in the late 7th century BC, with a plan measuring 10.00 x 15.60 m. The Doric Great temple of Apollo, was built in c. 475 BC. The temple's stylobate measures 13.72 x 29.78 m, and the number of pteron columns as 6 x 13. Marble was extensively used.
- Ambracia: A Doric peripteral temple dedicated to Apollo Pythios Sotir was built in 500 BC, at the centre of the Greek city Arta. Only some parts have been found, and it seems that the temple was built on earlier sanctuaries dedicated to Apollo. The temple measures 20.75 x 44.00 m at the stylobate. The foundation which supported the statue of the god, still exists.

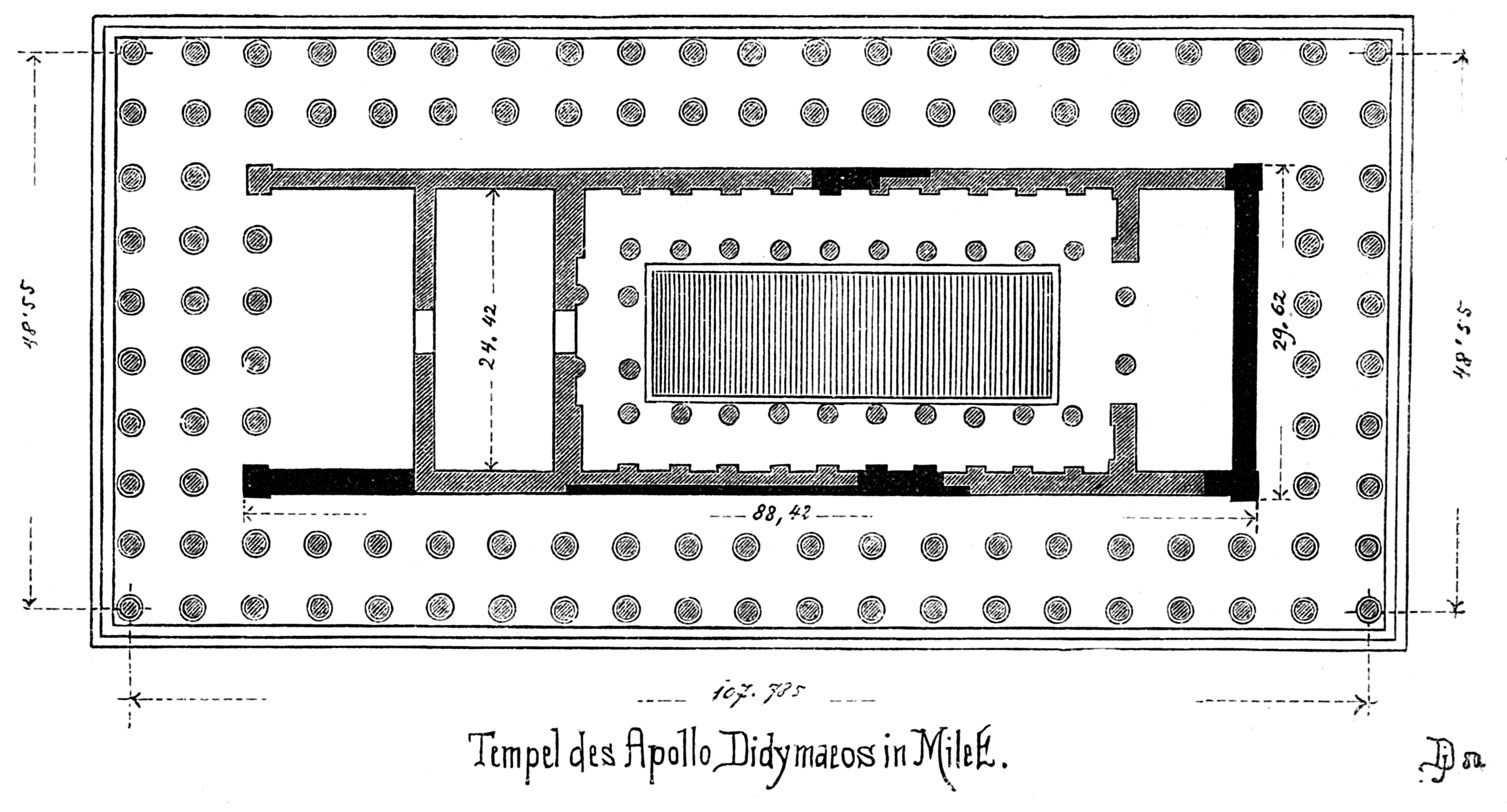
Temple of Apollo, Didyma

- Didyma (near Miletus): The gigantic Ionic temple of Apollo Didymaios started around 540 BC. The construction ceased and then it was restarted in 330 BC. The temple is dipteral, with an outer row of 10 x 21 columns, and it measures 28.90 x 80.75 m at the stylobate.
- Clarus (near ancient Colophon): According to the legend, the famous seer Calchas, on his return from Troy, came to Clarus. He challenged the seer Mopsus, and died when he lost. The Doric temple of Apollo Clarius was probably built in the 3rd century BC, and it was peripteral with 6 x 11 columns. It was reconstructed at the end of the Hellenistic period, and later from the emperor Hadrian but Pausanias claims that it was still incomplete in the 2nd century BC.

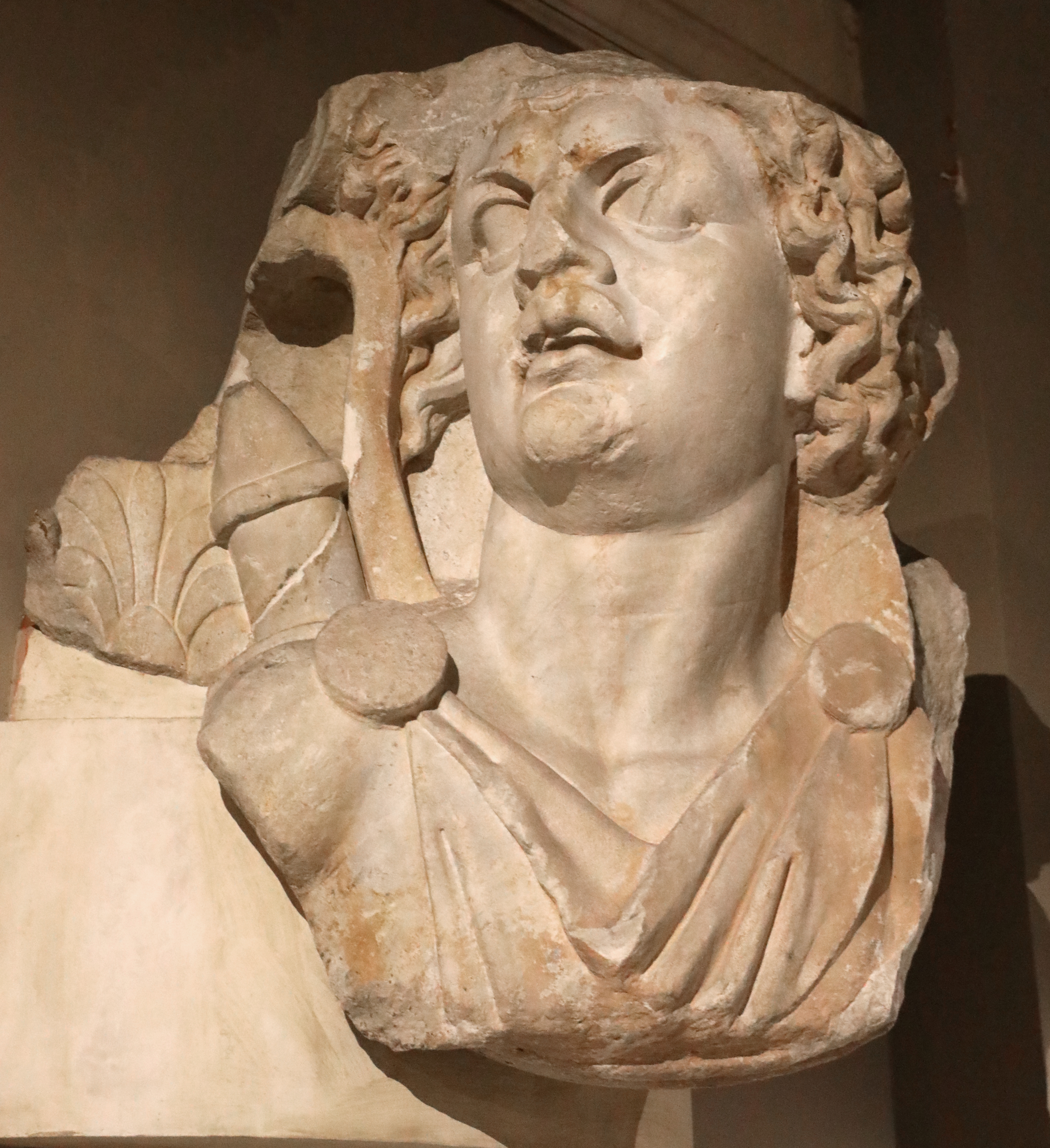
Hellenistic relief-bust of Apollo from Didyma in the Istanbul Archaeology Museums

- Hamaxitus (Troad): In the Iliad, Chryses the priest of Apollo, addresses the god with the epithet Smintheus (Lord of Mice), related to the god's ancient role as bringer of the disease (plague). Recent excavations indicate that the Hellenistic temple of Apollo Smintheus was constructed in 150–125 BC, but the symbol of the mouse god was used on coinage probably from the 4th century BC. The temple measures 40.00 x 23.00 m at the stylobate, and the number of pteron columns was 8 x 14.
- Pythion (Ancient Greek: Πύθιον), this was the name of a shrine of Apollo at Athens near the Ilisos river. It was created by Peisistratos, and tripods were placed there by those who had won in the cyclic chorus at the Thargelia.
- Setae (Lydia): The temple of Apollo Aksyros located in the city.
- Apollonia Pontica: There were two temples of Apollo Healer in the city. One from the Late Archaic period and the other from the Early Classical period.
- Ikaros island in the Persian Gulf (modern Failaka Island): There was a temple of Apollo on the island.
- Argos in Cyprus: there was a temple of Apollo Erithios (Ἐριθίου Ἀπόλλωνος ἱερῷ).
- The temple and oracle of Apollo at Eutresis.
- An altar of Apollo Acritas was at Lacedaemon. In addition, above a sanctuary surnamed Gasepton of Earth in Lacedaemon was set up the Maleatian Apollo.

=== Etruscan and Roman temples ===
- Veii (Etruria): The temple of Apollo was built in the late 6th century BC, indicating the spread of Apollo's culture (Aplu) in Etruria. There was a prostyle porch, which is called Tuscan, and a triple cella 18.50 m wide.
- Falerii Veteres (Etruria): A temple of Apollo was built probably in the 4th–3rd century BC. Parts of a terracotta capital, and a terracotta base have been found. It seems that the Etruscan columns were derived from the archaic Doric. A cult of Apollo Soranus is attested by one inscription found near Falerii.

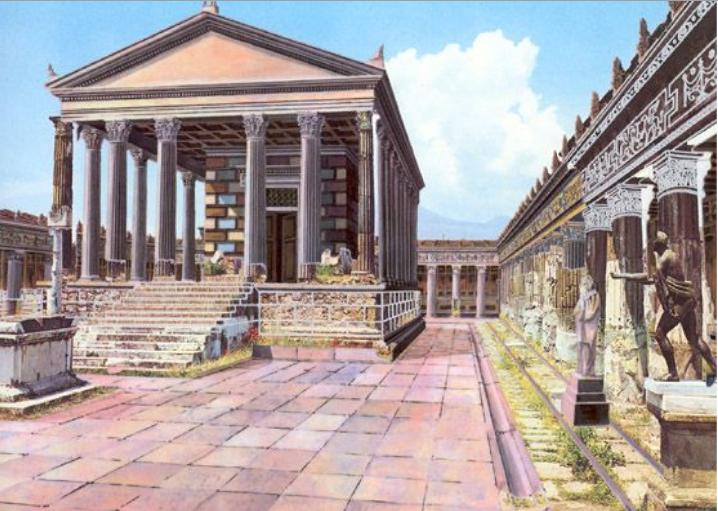
Artist's reconstruction of the Temple of Apollo (Pompeii)

- Pompeii (Italy): The cult of Apollo was widespread in the region of Campania since the 6th century BC. The temple was built in 120 BC, but its beginnings lie in the 6th century BC. It was reconstructed after an earthquake in AD 63. It demonstrates a mixing of styles which formed the basis of Roman architecture. The columns in front of the cella formed a Tuscan prostyle porch, and the cella is situated unusually far back. The peripteral colonnade of 48 Ionic columns was placed in such a way that the emphasis was given to the front side.

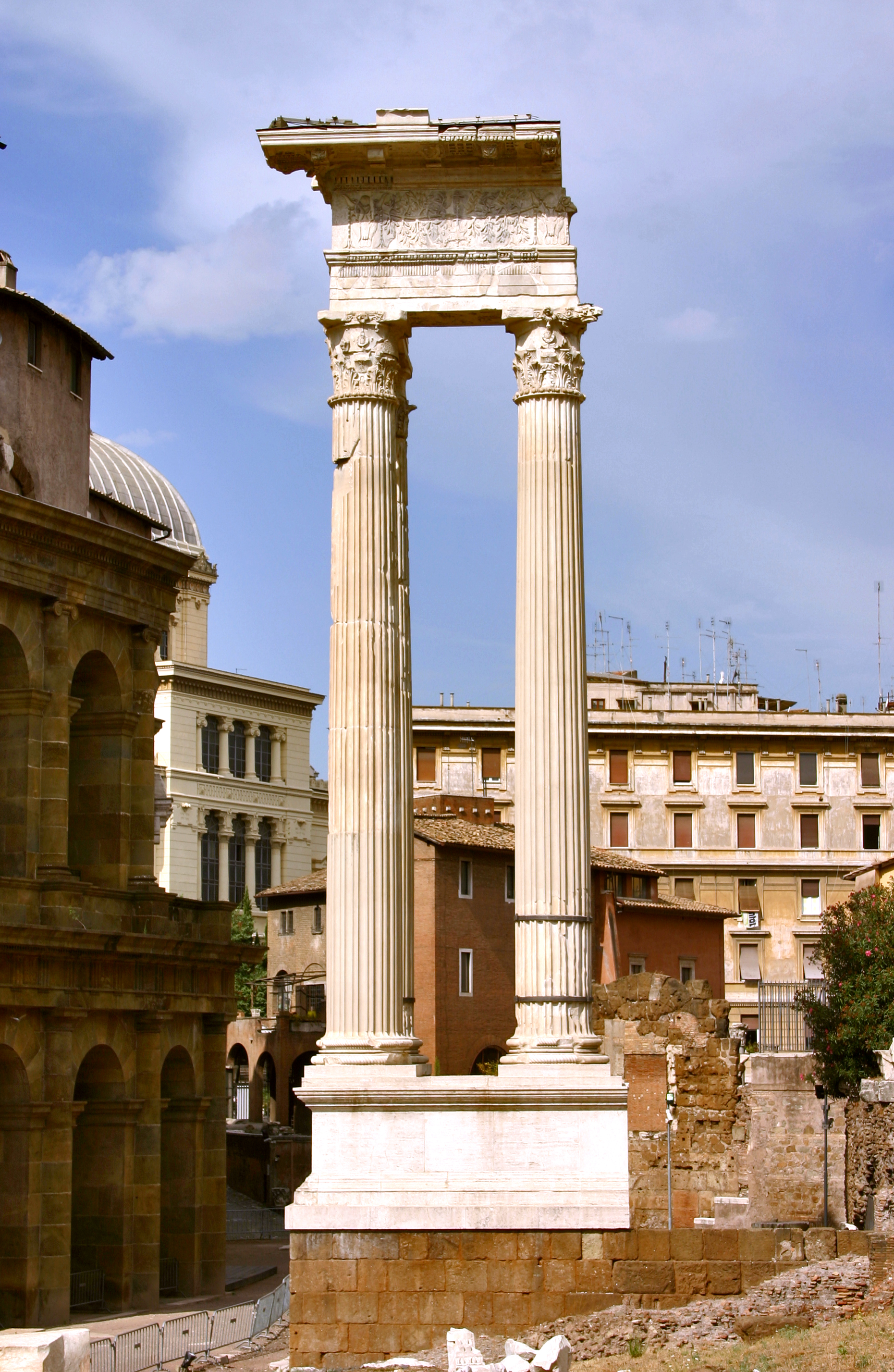
Temple of Apollo Sosianus, Rome

- Rome: The temple of Apollo Sosianus and the temple of Apollo Medicus. The first temple building dates to 431 BC, and was dedicated to Apollo Medicus (the doctor), after a plague of 433 BC. It was rebuilt by Gaius Sosius, probably in 34 BC. Only three columns with Corinthian capitals exist today. It seems that the cult of Apollo had existed in this area since at least to the mid-5th century BC.
- Rome: The temple of Apollo Palatinus was located on the Palatine hill within the sacred boundary of the city. It was dedicated by Augustus in 28 BC. The façade of the original temple was Ionic and it was constructed from solid blocks of marble. Many famous statues by Greek masters were on display in and around the temple, including a marble statue of the god at the entrance and a statue of Apollo in the cella.
- Melite (modern Mdina, Malta): A Temple of Apollo was built in the city in the 2nd century AD. Its remains were discovered in the 18th century, and many of its architectural fragments were dispersed among private collections or reworked into new sculptures. Parts of the temple's podium were rediscovered in 2002.

== Mythology ==
=== Birth ===
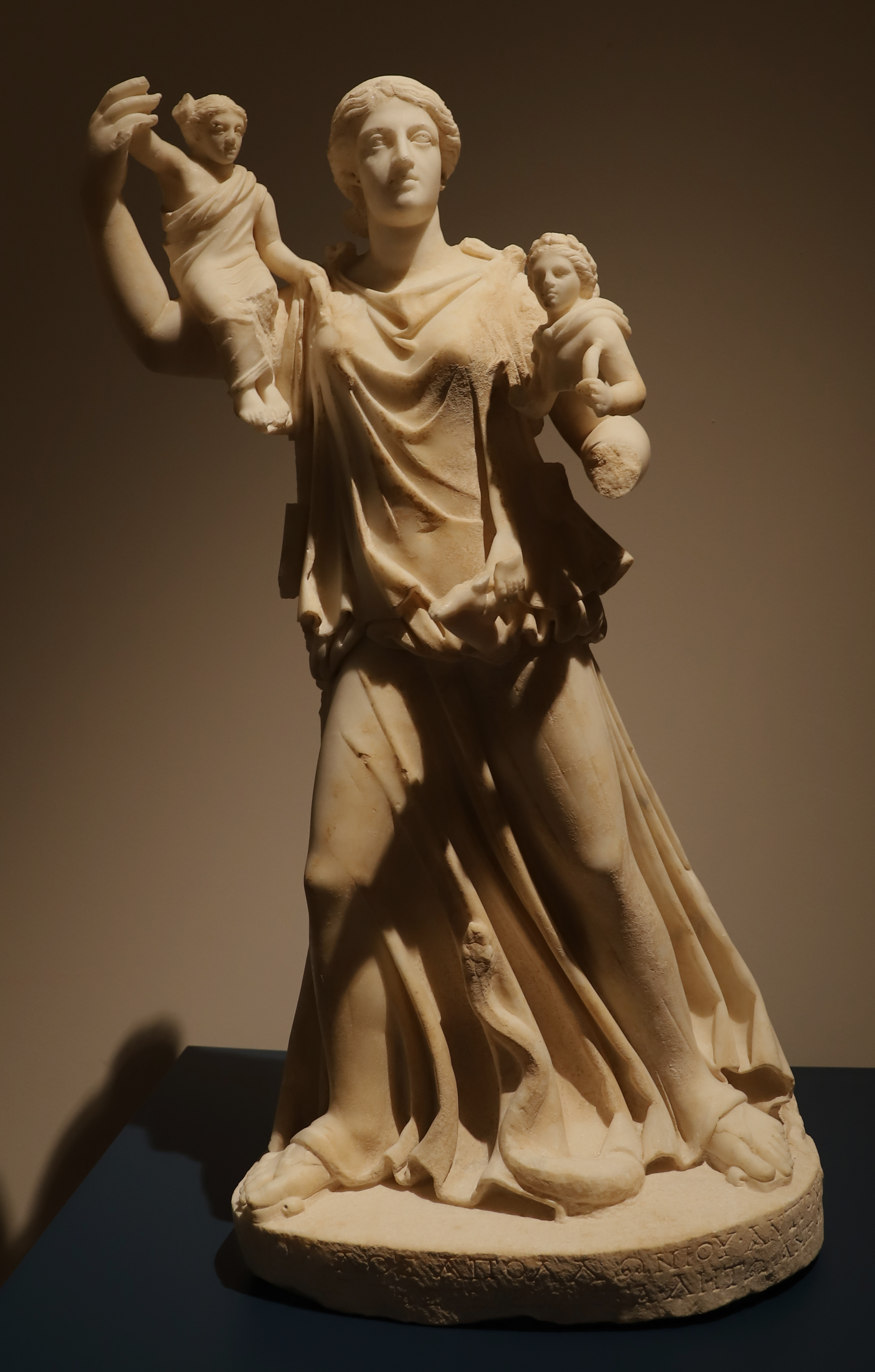
Leto fleeing with Artemis and Apollo, AD 350–400, in Kunstsien Stichting

In Greek mythology, Apollo was the son of Zeus, the king of the Olympian gods, and Leto, a Titan goddess and daughter of the Titans Coeus and Phoebe. According to myth, Leto was pursued by Hera, Zeus's wife, while searching for a place to give birth. She eventually found refuge on the Greek island of Delos, where she gave birth to Apollo and his twin sister, Artemis.

==== Homeric Hymn to Apollo ====
Pregnant with the offspring of Zeus, Leto wandered through many lands wanting to give birth to Apollo, but she was rejected everywhere out of fear. Upon reaching Delos, Leto requested the island to shelter her, and that in return her son would bring fame and prosperity to the island. Delos then revealed to Leto that Apollo was rumoured to be the god who will "greatly lord it among gods and men all over the fruitful earth". For this reason, people were fearful, and Delos worried that Apollo would cast her aside once he was born. Hearing this, Leto swore on the river Styx that if she was allowed to give birth on the island, her son would honor Delos the most among all the other lands. Assured by this, Delos agreed to assist Leto. All goddesses except Hera also came to aid Leto.

However, Leto was unable to give birth, because Hera had tricked Eileithyia, the goddess of childbirth, to stay on Olympus. The goddesses then convinced Iris to go bring Eileithyia by offering her a necklace of amber 9 yards (8.2 m) long. Iris did accordingly and persuaded Eileithyia to step onto the island. Thus, clutching a palm tree, Leto finally gave birth after labouring for nine days and nine nights, with Apollo "leaping forth" from his mother's womb. The goddesses washed the newborn, covered him in a white garment and fastened golden bands around him. Themis, the goddess of divine law, fed him nectar and ambrosia, as Leto was unable to do so. Upon tasting the divine food, the child broke free of the bands fastened onto him and declared that he would be the master of lyre and archery, and interpret the will of Zeus to humankind. He then started to walk, which caused the island to be filled with gold.

==== Callimachus's Hymn to Delos ====
The island Delos used to be Asteria, a goddess who jumped into the waters to escape the advances of Zeus and became a free-floating island of the same name. When Leto got pregnant, Hera was told that Leto's son would become more dear to Zeus than Ares. Enraged by this, Hera watched over the heavens and sent out Ares and Iris to prevent Leto from giving birth on the earth. Ares, stationed over the mainland, and Iris, over the islands, threatened all the lands and prevented them from helping Leto.

When Leto arrived at Thebes, fetal Apollo prophesied from his mother's womb that in the future he would punish a slanderous woman in Thebes (Niobe), so he did not want to be born there. Leto then went to Thessaly and sought the help of the river nymphs who were the daughters of the river Peneus. Despite being initially fearful and reluctant, Peneus later decided to let Leto give birth in his waters. He did not change his mind, even when Ares produced a terrifying sound and threatened to hurl mountain peaks into the river. But Leto herself declined his help and departed, as she did not want him to suffer for her sake.

After being turned away from various lands, Apollo spoke again from the womb, asking his mother to take look at the floating island in front of her and expressing his wish to be born there. When Leto approached Asteria, all the other islands fled. But Asteria welcomed Leto without any fear of Hera. Walking on the island, she sat down against a palm tree and asked Apollo to be born. During the childbirth, swans circled the island seven times, a sign that later on Apollo would play the seven-stringed lyre. When Apollo finally "leapt forth" from his mother's womb, the nymphs of the island sang a hymn to Eileithyia that was heard to the heavens. The moment Apollo was born, the entire island, including the trees and the waters, became gold. Asteria bathed the newborn, swaddled him and fed him with her breast milk. The island had become rooted and was later called Delos.

Hera was no longer angry, as Zeus had managed to calm her down; and she held no grudge against Asteria, since Asteria had rejected Zeus in the past.

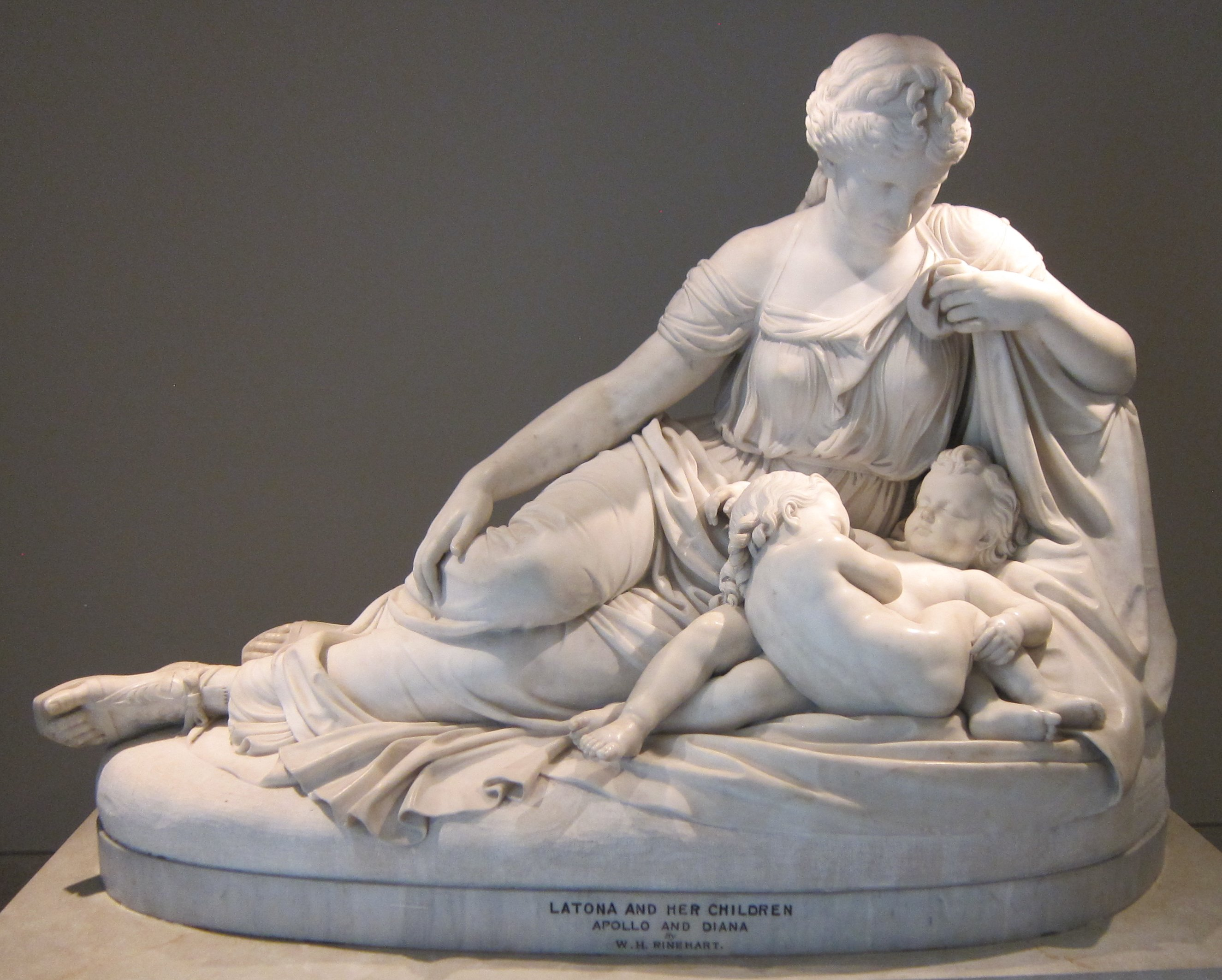
Leto with her children, by William Henry Rinehart

==== Pindar ====
Pindar is the earliest source who explicitly calls Apollo and Artemis twins. Wanting to escape Zeus's advances, Leto's sister Asteria flung herself into the sea and became a floating rock called Ortygia until the twins were born. When Leto stepped on the rock, four pillars with adamantine bases rose from the earth and held up the rock. When Apollo and Artemis were born, their bodies shone radiantly and a chant was sung by Eileithyia and Lachesis, one of the three Moirai.

==== Hyginus ====
Scorning the advances of Zeus, Asteria transformed herself into a bird and jumped into a sea. From her, an island rose which was called Ortygia. When Hera discovered that Leto was pregnant with Zeus's child, she decreed that Leto can give birth only in a place where sun does not shine. During this time, the monster Python also started hounding Leto with an intent of killing her, because he had foreseen his death coming at the hands of Leto's offspring. However, on Zeus's orders, Boreas carried away Leto and entrusted her to Poseidon. To protect her, Poseidon took her to the island Ortygia and covered it with waves so that the sun would not shine on it. Leto gave birth clinging to an olive tree and henceforth the island was called Delos.

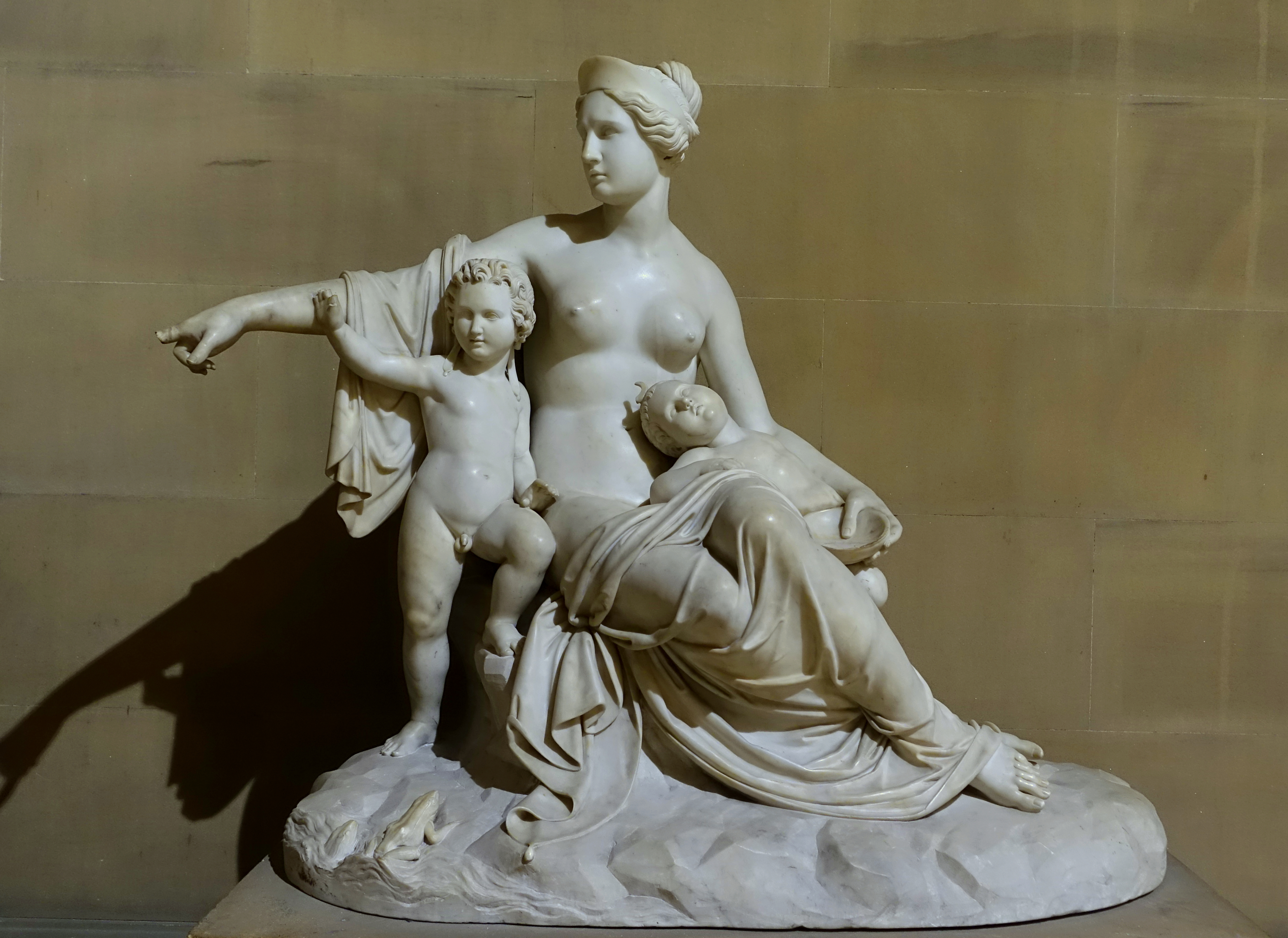
Leto with Apollo and Artemis, by Francesco Pozzi

==== Other variations ====
Aelian states that it took Leto twelve days and twelve nights to travel from Hyperborea to Delos. Leto changed herself into a she-wolf before giving birth. This is given as the reason why Homer describes Apollo as the "wolf-born god".

According to Strabo, the Curetes helped Leto by creating loud noises with their weapons and thus frightening Hera, they concealed Leto's childbirth. Theognis wrote that the island was filled with ambrosial fragrance when Apollo was born, and the Earth laughed with joy. In some versions, Artemis was born first and subsequently assisted with the birth of Apollo.

While in some accounts Apollo's birth itself fixed the floating Delos to the earth, there are accounts of Apollo securing Delos to the bottom of the ocean a little while later. This island became sacred to Apollo and was one of the major cult centres of the god. Apollo was born on the seventh day (ἑβδομαγενής, hebdomagenes) of the month Thargelion—according to Delian tradition—or of the month Bysios—according to Delphian tradition. The seventh and twentieth, the days of the new and full moon, were ever afterwards held sacred to him.

=== Hyperborea ===
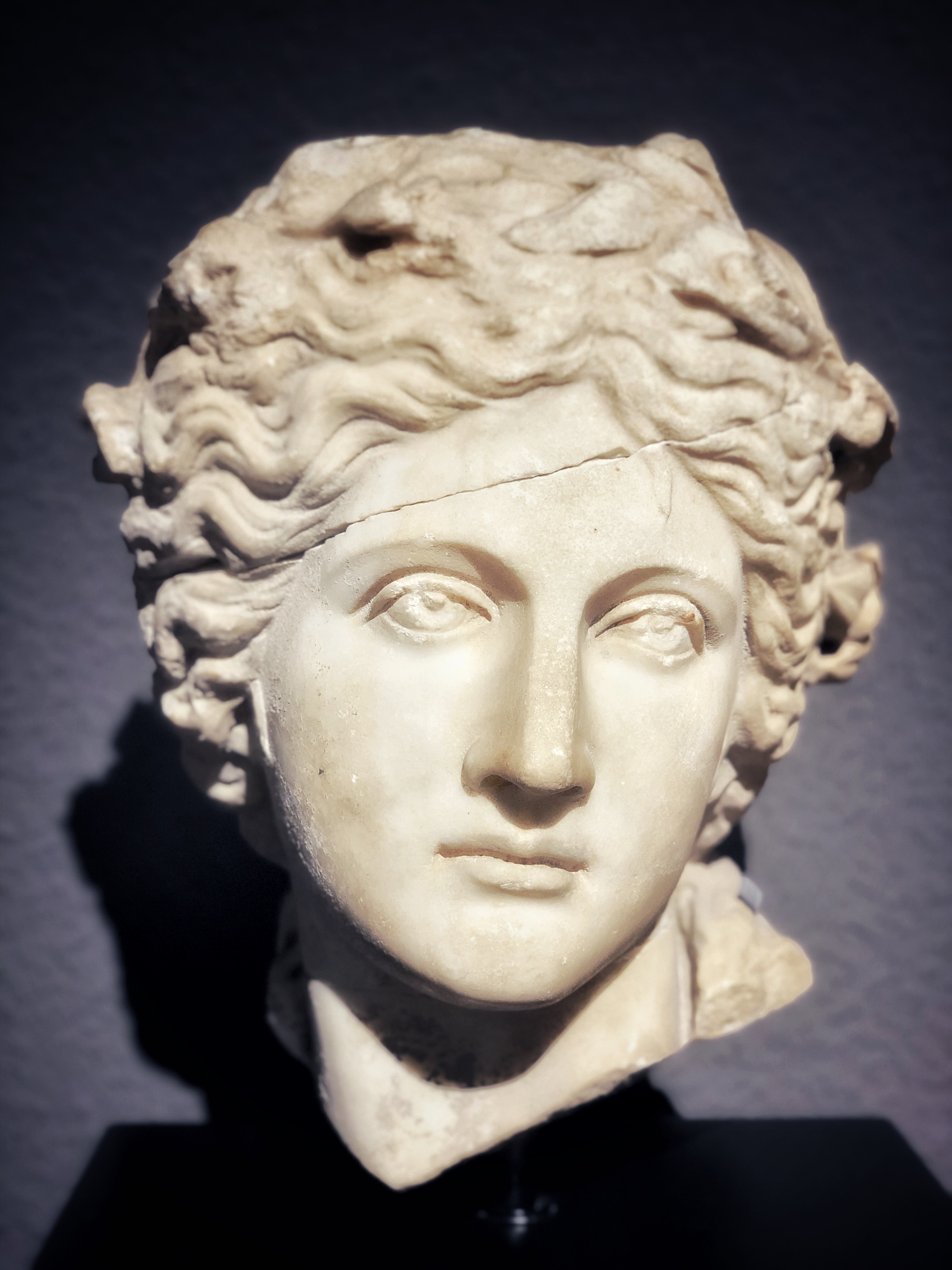
Apollo head in the Antalya Museum, Turkey

Hyperborea, the mystical land of eternal spring, venerated Apollo above all the gods. The Hyperboreans always sang and danced in his honor and hosted Pythian games. There, a vast forest of beautiful trees was called "the garden of Apollo". Apollo spent the winter months among the Hyperboreans, leaving his shrine in Delphi under the care of Dionysus. His absence from the world caused coldness and this was marked as his annual death. No prophecies were issued during this time. He returned to the world during the beginning of the spring. The Theophania festival was held in Delphi to celebrate his return.

However, Diodorus Silculus states that Apollo visited Hyperborea every nineteen years. This nineteen-year period was called by the Greeks as the 'year of Meton', the time period in which the stars returned to their initial positions. And that visiting Hyperborea at that time, Apollo played on the cithara and danced continuously from the vernal equinox until the rising of the Pleiades (constellations).

Hyperborea was also Leto's birthplace. It is said that Leto came to Delos from Hyperborea accompanied by a pack of wolves. Henceforth, Hyperborea became Apollo's winter home and wolves became sacred to him. His intimate connection to wolves is evident from his epithet Lyceus, meaning wolf-like. But Apollo was also the wolf-slayer in his role as the god who protected flocks from predators. The Hyperborean worship of Apollo bears the strongest marks of Apollo being worshipped as the sun god. Shamanistic elements in Apollo's cult are often liked to his Hyperborean origin, and he is likewise speculated to have originated as a solar shaman. Shamans like Abaris and Aristeas were also the followers of Apollo, who hailed from Hyperborea.

In myths, the tears of amber Apollo shed when his son Asclepius died mixed with the waters of the river Eridanos, which surrounded Hyperborea. Apollo also buried in Hyperborea the arrow which he had used to kill the Cyclopes. He later gave this arrow to Abaris.

=== Childhood and youth ===
Growing up, Apollo was nursed by the nymphs Korythalia and Aletheia, the personification of truth. Phoebe, his grandmother, gave the oracular shrine of Delphi to Apollo as a birthday gift.

As a four-year-old child, Apollo built a foundation and an altar on Delos using the horns of the goats that his sister Artemis hunted. Since he learnt the art of building when young, he came to be known as Archegetes, (the founder of towns) and guided men to build new cities. To keep the child amused, the Delian nymphs ran around the altar beating it, and then with their hands tied behind their backs, bit an olive branch. It later became a custom for all the sailors who passed by the island to do the same.

From his father Zeus, Apollo received a golden headband and a chariot driven by swans.

In his early years when Apollo spent his time herding cows, he was reared by the Thriae, who trained him and enhanced his prophetic skills. The god Pan was also said to have mentored him in the prophetic art. Apollo is also said to have invented the lyre, and along with Artemis, the art of archery. He then taught the humans the art of healing and archery.

==== Slaying of Python ====
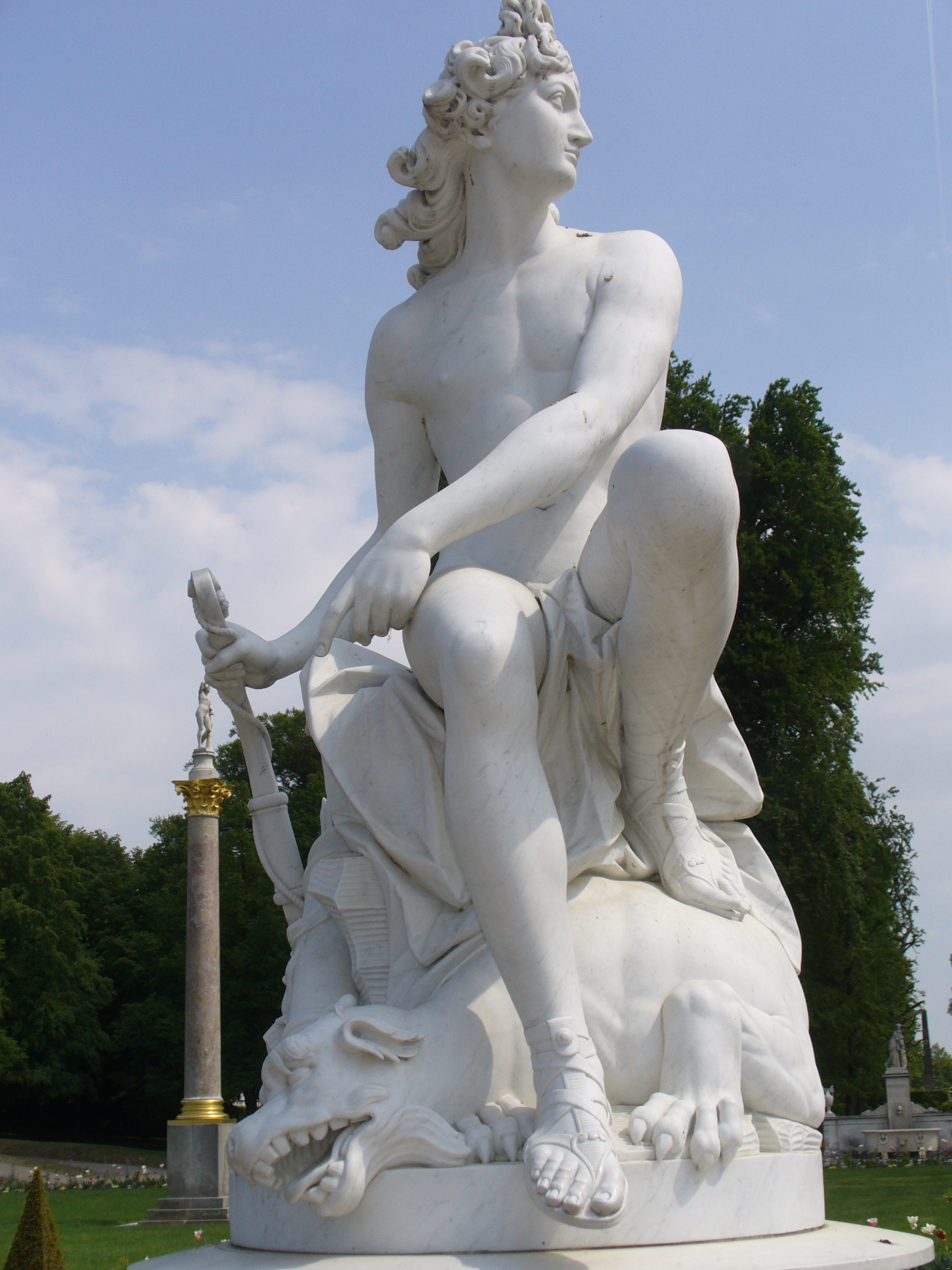
Apollo victorious over the Python, by François Gaspard Adam

Python, a chthonic serpent-dragon, was a child of Gaia and the guardian of the Delphic Oracle. In Callimachus's hymn to Delos, fetal Apollo foresees the death of Python at his hands.

In the Homeric hymn to Apollo, Python was a female drakon and the nurse of the giant Typhon whom Hera had created to overthrow Zeus. She was described as a terrifying monster and a "bloody plague". Apollo, in his pursuit to establish his worship, came across Python and killed her with a single arrow shot from his bow. He let the corpse rot under the sun and declared himself the oracular deity of Delphi. Other authors have Apollo kill the monster using a hundred arrows or a thousand arrows.

According to Euripides, Leto had brought her twins to the cliffs of Parnassus shortly after giving birth to them. Upon seeing the monster there, Apollo, still a child being carried in his mother's arms, leapt forth and killed Python. Some authors also mention that Python was killed for displaying lustful affections towards Leto.

In another account, Python chased pregnant Leto with an intent of killing her because his death was fated to come at the hands of Leto's child. However, he had to stop the chase when Leto came under the protection of Poseidon. After his birth, four days old Apollo killed the serpent with the bow and arrows gifted to him by Hephaestus and avenged the trouble given to his mother. The god then put the bones of the slain monster in a cauldron and deposited it in his temple.

This legend is also narrated as the origin of the cry "Hië paian". According to Athenaeus, Python attacked Leto and her twins during their visit to Delphi. Taking Artemis into her arms, Leto climbed upon a rock and cried at Apollo to shoot the monster. The cry let out by her, "ιε, παῖ" ("Shoot, boy") later got slightly altered as "ἰὴ παιών" (Hië paian), an exclamation to avert evils. Callimachus attributes the origin of this phrase to the Delphians, who let out the cry to encourage Apollo when the young god battled with Python.

Strabo has recorded a slightly different version where Python was actually a cruel and lawless man who was also known by the name "Drakon". When Apollo was teaching the humans to cultivate fruits and civilise themselves, the residents of Parnassus complained to the god about Python. In response to their pleas, Apollo killed the man with his arrows. During the fight, the Parnassians shouted "Hië paian" to encourage the god.

==== Establishment of worship in Delphi ====
Continuing from his victory over Python, the Homeric hymn describes how the young god established his worship among the humans. As Apollo was pondering about what kind of men he should recruit to serve him, he spotted a ship full of Cretan merchants or pirates. He took the form of a dolphin and sprang aboard the ship. Whenever the oblivious crew members tried throwing the dolphin overboard, the god shook the ship until the crew was awed into submission. Apollo then created a breeze that directed the ship to Delphi. Upon reaching the land, he revealed himself as a god and initiated them as his priests. He instructed them to guard his temple and always keep righteousness in their hearts.

Alcaeus narrates the following account: Zeus, who had adorned his newborn son with a golden headband, also provided him with a chariot driven by swans and instructed Apollo to visit Delphi to establish his laws among the people. But Apollo disobeyed his father and went to the land of Hyperborea. The Delphians continuously sung paeans in his honour and pleaded him to come back to them. The god returned only after a year and then carried out Zeus's orders.

In other variations, the shrine at Delphi was simply handed over to Apollo by his grandmother Phoebe as a gift, or Themis herself inspired him to be the oracular voice of Delphi.

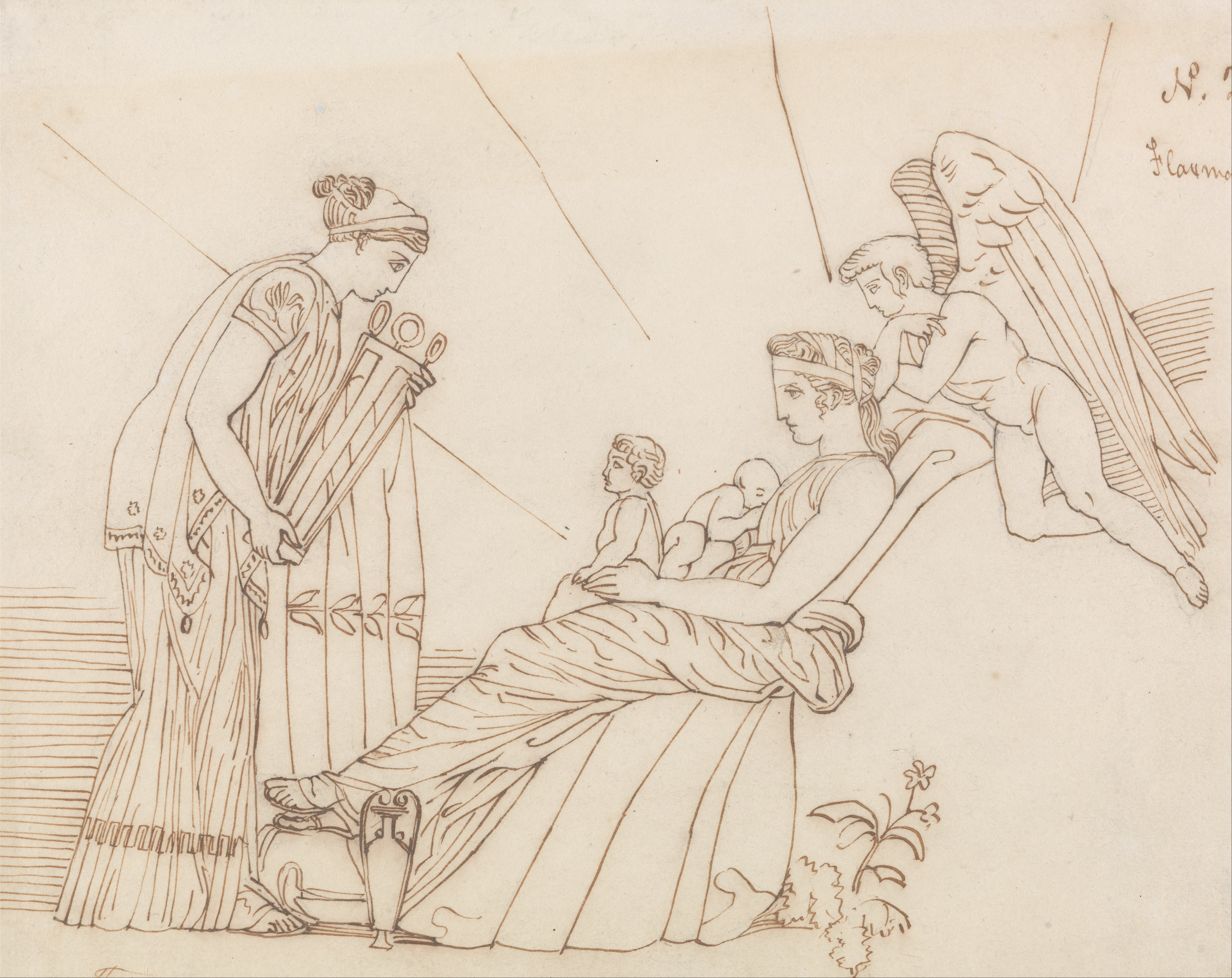
Phoebe gifts the oracular tripod to Apollo, by John Flaxman

However, in many other accounts, Apollo had to overcome certain obstacles before he was able to establish himself at Delphi. Gaea came in conflict with Apollo for killing Python and claiming the Delphic oracle for himself. According to Pindar, she sought to banish Apollo to Tartarus as a punishment. According to Euripides, soon after Apollo took the ownership of the oracle, Gaea started sending prophetic dreams to the humans. As a result, people stopped visiting Delphi to obtain prophecies. Troubled by this, Apollo went to Olympus and supplicated to Zeus. Zeus, admiring the ambitions of his young son, granted his request by putting an end to the dream visions. This sealed the role of Apollo as the oracular deity of Delphi.

Since Apollo had committed a blood crime, he also had to be purified. Pausanias has recorded two of the many variations of this purification. In one of them, both Apollo and Artemis fled to Sicyon and were purified there. In the other tradition that had been prevalent among the Cretans, Apollo alone travelled to Crete and was purified by Carmanor. In another account, the Argive king Crotopus was the one who performed the purification rites on Apollo alone.

According the Aristonous and Aelian, Apollo was purified by the will of Zeus in the Vale of Tempe. Aristonous has continued the tale, saying that Apollo was escorted back to Delphi by Athena. As a token of gratitude, he later built a temple for Athena at Delphi, which served as a threshold for his own temple. Upon reaching Delphi, Apollo convinced Gaea and Themis into handing over the seat of oracle to him. To celebrate this event, other immortals also graced Apollo with gifts – Poseidon gave him the land of Delphi, the Delphian nymphs gifted him the Corycian cave, and Artemis set her dogs to patrol and safeguard the land.

Plutarch, however, has mentioned a variation where Apollo was neither purified in Tempe nor banished to Earth as a servant for nine years, but was driven out to another world for nine great years. The god who returned was cleansed and purified, thus becoming a "true Phoebus – that is to say, clear and bright". He then took over the Delphic oracle, which had been under the care of Themis in his absence. Henceforth, Apollo became the god who cleansed himself from the sin of murder, made men aware of their guilt and purified them.

The Pythian games were also established by Apollo, either as funeral games to honor Python or to celebrate his own victory. The Pythia was Apollo's high priestess and his mouthpiece through whom he gave prophecies.

==== Tityus ====
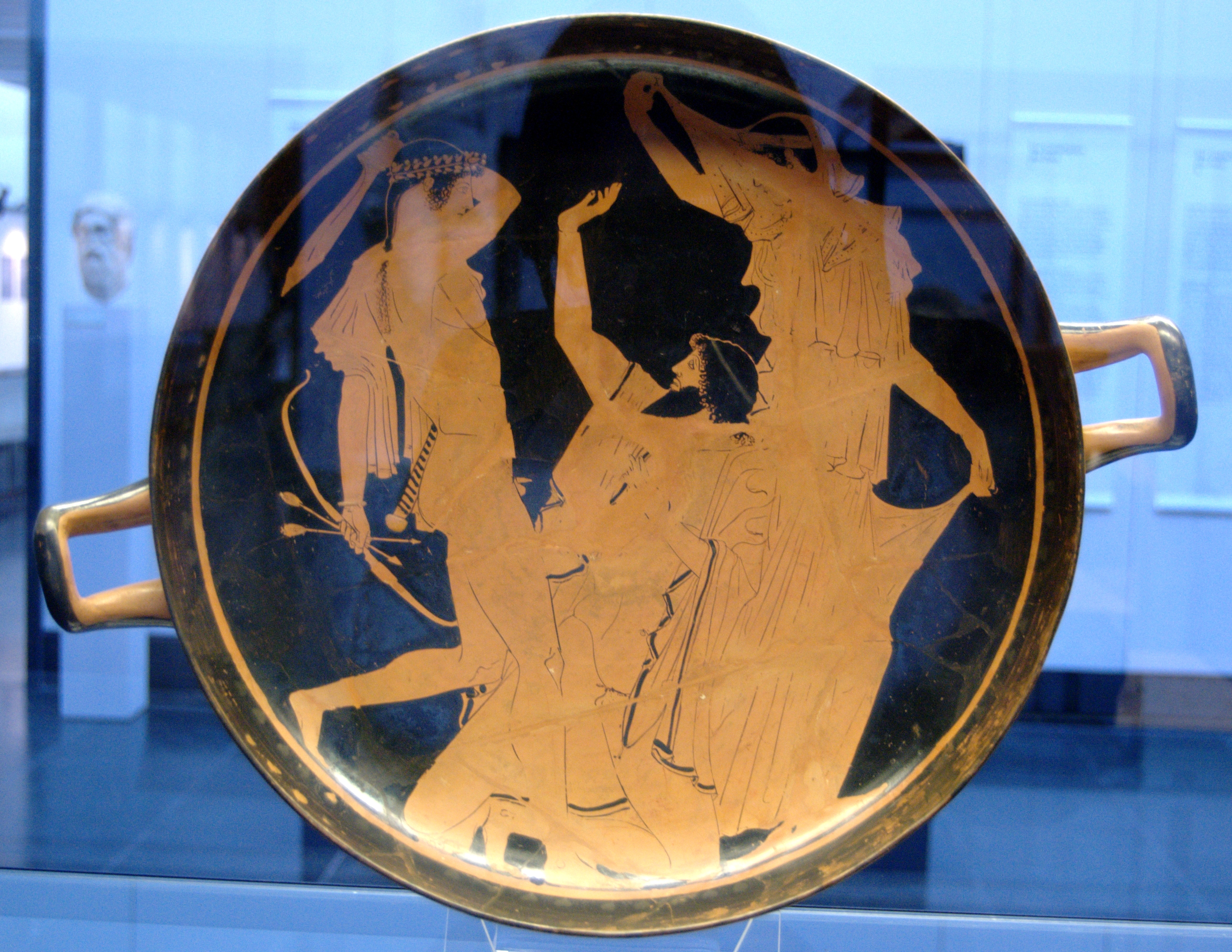
Apollo (left) slaying Tityos (centre), Attic red-figure kylix, 460–450 BC

Tityus was another giant who tried to rape Leto, either on his own accord when she was on her way to Delphi or at the order of Hera. Leto called upon on her children who instantly slew the giant. Apollo, still a young boy, shot him with his arrows. In some accounts, Artemis also joined him in protecting their mother by attacking Tityos with her arrows.

=== Admetus ===
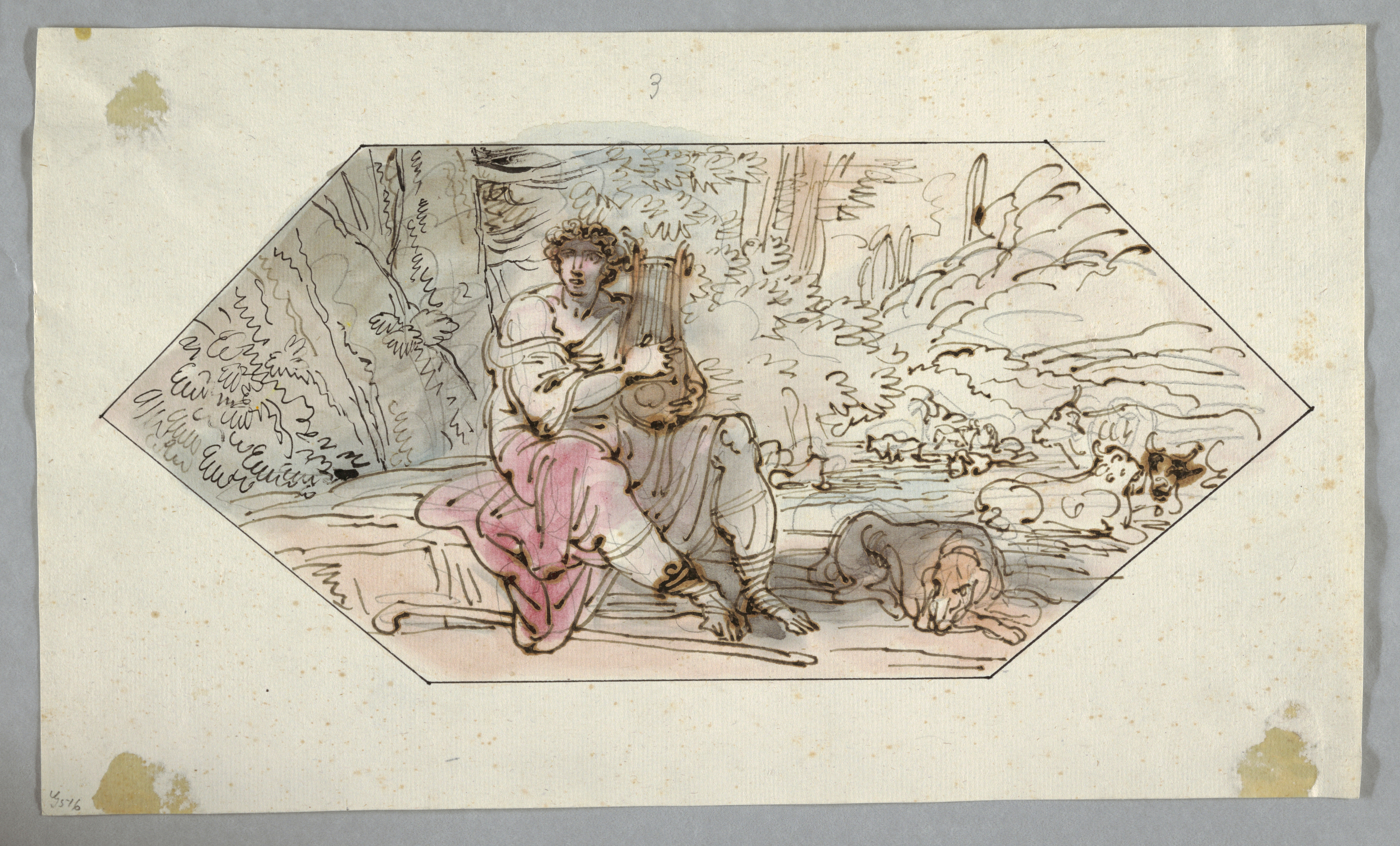
Apollo guards the herds (or flocks) of King Admetus, by Felice Gianni

Admetus was the king of Pherae, who was known for his hospitality. When Apollo was exiled from Olympus for killing Python, he served as a herdsman under Admetus, who was then young and unmarried. Apollo is said to have shared a romantic relationship with Admetus during his stay. After completing his years of servitude, Apollo went back to Olympus as a god. The servitude was said to have lasted for either one year, or one great year (a cycle of eight years), or nine years.

Because Admetus had treated Apollo well, the god conferred great benefits on him in return. Apollo's mere presence is said to have made the cattle give birth to twins. Apollo helped Admetus win the hand of Alcestis, the daughter of King Pelias, by taming a lion and a boar to draw Admetus's chariot. He was present during their wedding to give his blessings. When Admetus angered the goddess Artemis by forgetting to give her the due offerings, Apollo came to the rescue and calmed his sister. When Apollo learnt of Admetus's untimely death, he convinced or tricked the Fates into letting Admetus live past his time.

According to another version, or perhaps some years later, when Zeus struck down Apollo's son Asclepius with a lightning bolt for resurrecting the dead, Apollo in revenge killed the Cyclopes, who had fashioned the bolt for Zeus. Apollo would have been banished to Tartarus for this, but his mother Leto intervened, and reminding Zeus of their old love, pleaded with him not to punish their son so severely. Zeus obliged and sentenced Apollo to one year of hard labor once again under Admetus.

=== Niobe ===
The fate of Niobe was prophesied by Apollo while he was still in Leto's womb. Niobe was the queen of Thebes and wife of Amphion. She displayed hubris when she boasted that she was superior to Leto because she had fourteen children (Niobids), seven male and seven female, while Leto had only two. She further mocked Apollo's effeminate appearance and Artemis's manly appearance. Leto, insulted by this, told her children to punish Niobe. Accordingly, Apollo killed Niobe's sons, and Artemis her daughters. According to some versions of the myth, among the Niobids, Chloris and her brother Amyclas were not killed because they prayed to Leto. Amphion, at the sight of his dead sons, either killed himself or was killed by Apollo after swearing revenge.

A devastated Niobe fled to Mount Sipylos in Asia Minor and turned into stone as she wept. Her tears formed the river Achelous. Zeus had turned all the people of Thebes to stone and so no one buried the Niobids until the ninth day after their death, when the gods themselves entombed them.

When Chloris married and had children, Apollo granted her son Nestor the years he had taken away from the Niobids. Hence, Nestor was able to live for 3 generations.

=== Building the walls of Troy ===
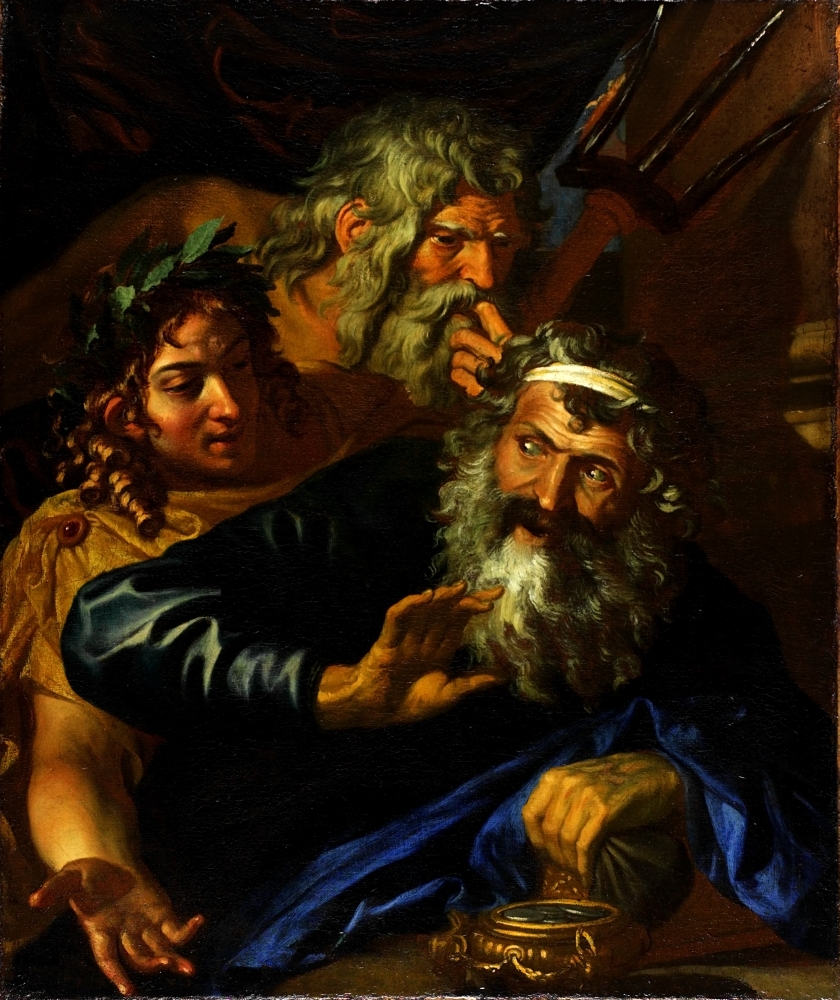
Laomedon refusing payment to Poseidon and Apollo, by Joachim von Sandrart

Once Apollo and Poseidon served under the Trojan king Laomedon in accordance with Zeus's words. Apollodorus states that the gods willingly went to the king disguised as humans in order to check his hubris. Apollo guarded the cattle of Laomedon in the valleys of Mount Ida, while Poseidon built the walls of Troy. Other versions make both Apollo and Poseidon the builders of the wall. In Ovid's account, Apollo completes his task by playing his tunes on his lyre.

In Pindar's odes, the gods took a mortal named Aeacus as their assistant. When the work was completed, three snakes rushed against the wall, and though the two that attacked the sections of the wall built by the gods fell down dead, the third forced its way into the city through the portion of the wall built by Aeacus. Apollo immediately prophesied that Troy would fall at the hands of Aeacus's descendants, the Aeacidae (i.e. his son Telamon joined Heracles when he sieged the city during Laomedon's rule. Later, his great-grandson Neoptolemus was present in the wooden horse that leads to the downfall of Troy).

However, the king not only refused to give the gods the wages he had promised, but also threatened to bind their hands and feet, as well as to sell them as slaves. Angered by the unpaid labour and the insults, Apollo infected the city with a pestilence and Poseidon sent the sea monster Cetus. To deliver the city from it, Laomedon had to sacrifice his daughter Hesione (who would later be saved by Heracles).

During his stay in Troy, Apollo had a lover named Ourea, who was a nymph and daughter of Poseidon. Together they had a son named Ileus, whom Apollo loved dearly.

=== Trojan War ===
Apollo sided with the Trojans during the Trojan War. During the war, the Greek king Agamemnon captured Chryseis, the daughter of Apollo's priest Chryses, and refused to return her. Angered by this, Apollo shot arrows infected with the plague into the Greek encampment. He demanded that they return the girl, and the Greeks complied, indirectly causing the anger of Achilles, which is the theme of the Iliad.

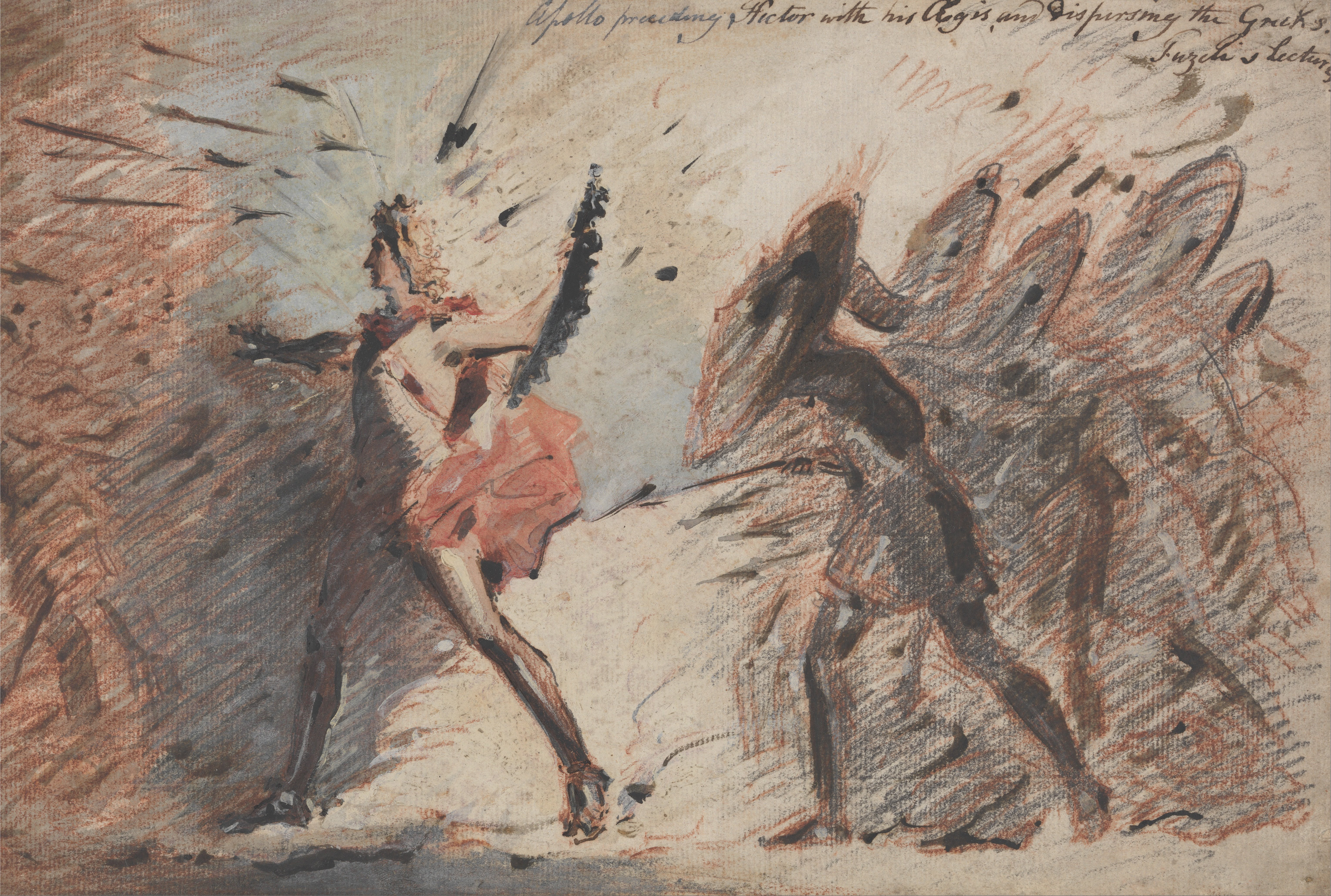
Apollo preceding Hector with his aegis, and dispersing the Greeks, by John Flaxman

Receiving the aegis from Zeus, Apollo entered the battlefield on his father's command, causing great terror to the enemy with his war cry. He pushed the Greeks back and destroyed many of the soldiers. He is described as "the rouser of armies" because he rallied the Trojan army when they were falling apart. When Zeus allowed the other gods to get involved in the war, Apollo was provoked by Poseidon to a duel. However, Apollo declined to fight him, saying that he would not fight his uncle for the sake of mortals.

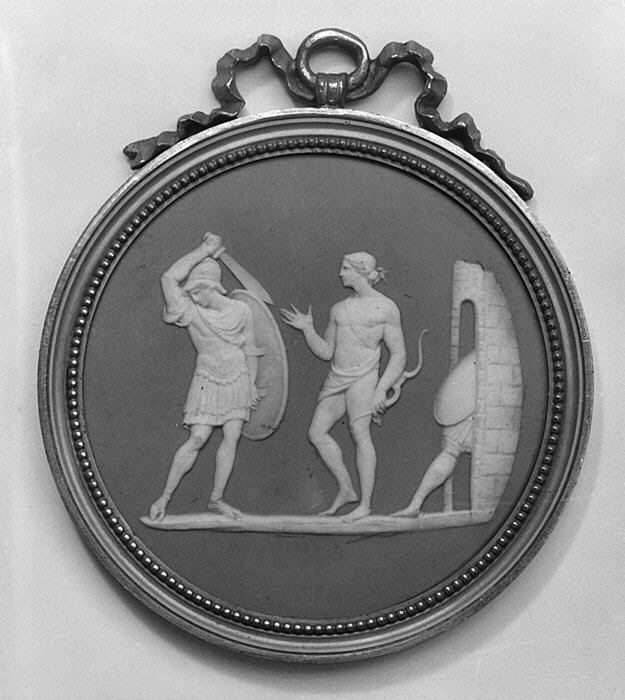
Apollo preventing Diomedes from pursuing Aeneas

When the Greek hero Diomedes injured the Trojan hero Aeneas, the son of Aphrodite, the goddess tried to rescue him, but Diomedes injured her as well. Apollo then enveloped Aeneas in a cloud to protect him. He repelled the attacks Diomedes made on him and gave the hero a stern warning to abstain from attacking a god. Aeneas was then taken to Pergamos, a sacred spot in Troy, where he was healed.

After the death of Sarpedon, a son of Zeus, having been killed by Patroclus, Apollo rescued his corpse from the battlefield as per his father's wish and cleaned it. He then gave it to Sleep (Hypnos) and Death (Thanatos). Apollo had also once convinced Athena to stop the war for that day, so that the warriors can relieve themselves for a while.

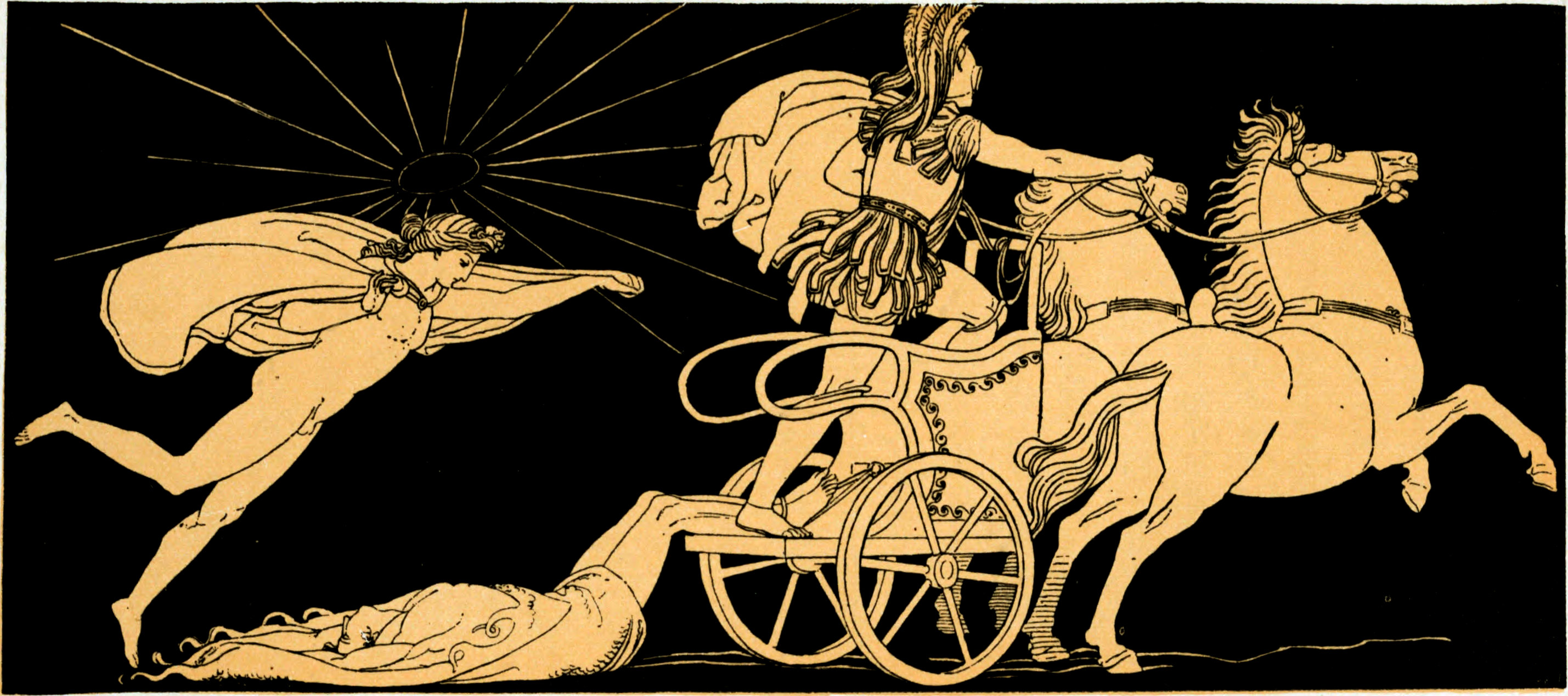
Apollo protecting Hector's body, by John Flaxman

The Trojan hero Hector (who, according to some, was the god's own son by Hecuba) was favored by Apollo. When he got severely injured, Apollo healed him and encouraged him to take up his arms. During a duel with Achilles, when Hector was about to lose, Apollo hid Hector in a cloud of mist to save him. When the Greek warrior Patroclus tried to get into the fort of Troy, he was stopped by Apollo. Encouraging Hector to attack Patroclus, Apollo stripped the armour of the Greek warrior and broke his weapons, after which Hector dealt the fatal blow, killing Patroclus. At last, after Hector's fated death, Apollo protected his corpse from Achilles's attempt to mutilate it by creating a magical cloud over the corpse, shielding it from the rays of the sun.

Apollo held a grudge against Achilles throughout the war because Achilles had murdered his son Tenes before the war began and brutally assassinated his son Troilus in his own temple. Not only did Apollo save Hector from Achilles, he also tricked Achilles by disguising himself as a Trojan warrior and driving him away from the gates. Finally, Apollo caused Achilles's death by guiding an arrow shot by Paris into Achilles' heel. In some versions, Apollo himself killed Achilles by taking the disguise of Paris.

Apollo helped many Trojan warriors—including Agenor, Polydamas, and Glaucus—in the battlefield. Though he greatly favored the Trojans, Apollo was bound to follow the orders of Zeus and served his father loyally during the war.

=== Nurturer of the young ===
Apollo Kourotrophos is the god who nurtures and protects children and the young, especially boys. He oversees their education and their passage into adulthood. Education is said to have originated from Apollo and the Muses.

Chiron, the abandoned centaur, was fostered by Apollo, who instructed him in fields including medicine, prophecy, and archery. Anius, Apollo's son by Rhoeo, was abandoned by his mother soon after his birth. Apollo brought him up and educated him in mantic arts. Anius later became the priest of Apollo and the king of Delos. Iamus was the son of Apollo and Evadne. When Evadne went into labour, Apollo sent the Moirai to assist his lover. After the child was born, Apollo sent snakes to feed the child some honey. When Iamus reached the age of education, Apollo took him to Olympia and taught him many arts, including the ability to understand and explain the languages of birds. Idmon was educated by Apollo to be a seer. Even though he foresaw his death that would happen in his journey with the Argonauts, he embraced his destiny and died a brave death. To commemorate his son's bravery, Apollo commanded Boeotians to build a town around the tomb of the hero, and to honor him.

=== God of music ===
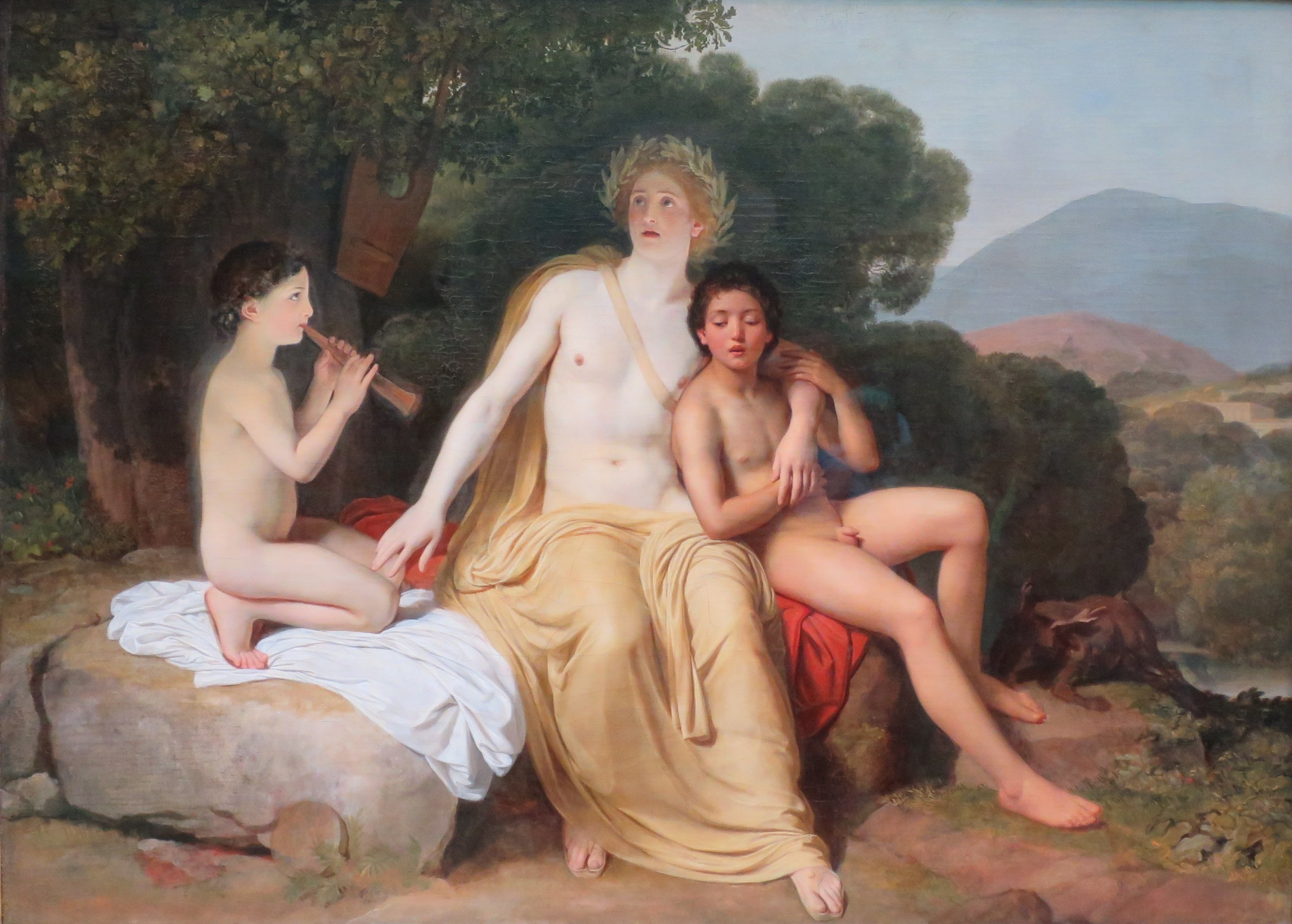
Apollo, Hyacinth and Cyparissus singing and playing, by Alexander Ivanov 1831–1834

Immediately after his birth, Apollo demanded a lyre and invented the paean, thus becoming the god of music. As the divine singer, he is the patron of poets, singers and musicians. The invention of string music is attributed to him. Plato said that the innate ability of humans to take delight in music, rhythm and harmony is the gift of Apollo and the Muses. According to Socrates, ancient Greeks believed that Apollo is the god who directs the harmony and makes all things move together, both for the gods and the humans. For this reason, he was called Homopolon before the Homo was replaced by A. Apollo's harmonious music delivered people from their pain, and hence, like Dionysus, he is also called the liberator. The swans, which were considered to be the most musical among the birds, were believed to be the "singers of Apollo". They are Apollo's sacred birds and acted as his vehicle during his travel to Hyperborea. Aelian says that when the singers would sing hymns to Apollo, the swans would join the chant in unison.

Among the Pythagoreans, the study of mathematics and music were connected to the worship of Apollo, their principal deity. Their belief was that music purifies the soul, just as medicine purifies the body. They also believed that music was delegated to the same mathematical laws of harmony as the mechanics of the cosmos, evolving into an idea known as the music of the spheres.

Apollo appears as the companion of the Muses, and as Musagetes ("leader of Muses") he leads them in dance. They spend their time on Parnassus, which is one of their sacred places. Apollo is also the lover of the Muses and by them he became the father of famous musicians like Orpheus and Linus.

Apollo is often found delighting the immortal gods with his songs and music on the lyre. In his role as the god of banquets, he was always present to play music at weddings of the gods, like the marriage of Eros and Psyche, Peleus and Thetis. He is a frequent guest of the Bacchanalia, and many ancient ceramics depict him being at ease amidst the maenads and satyrs. Apollo also participated in musical contests when challenged by others. He was the victor in all those contests, but he tended to punish his opponents severely for their hubris.

==== Apollo's lyre ====
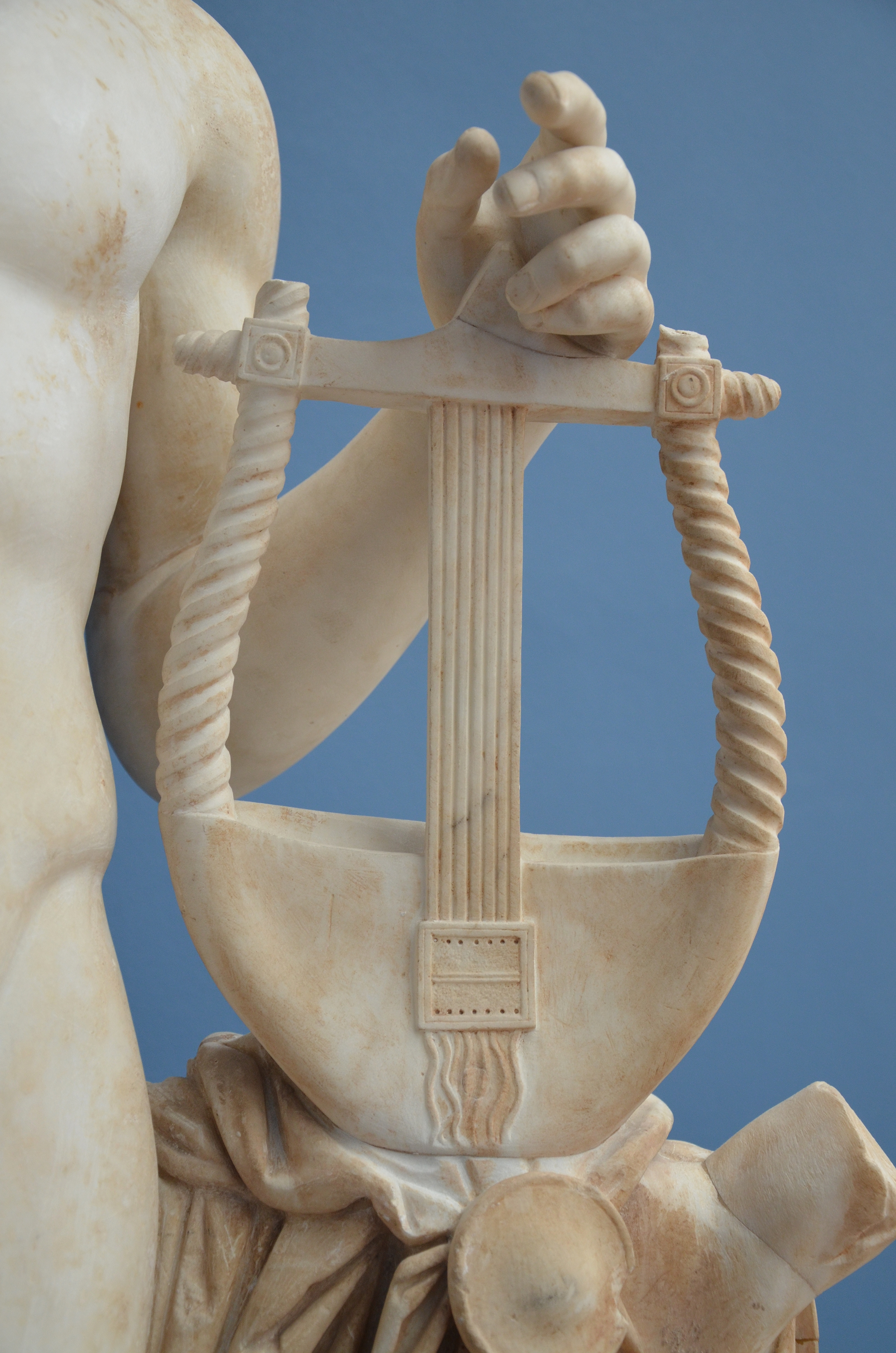
Detail of Apollo's lyre

The invention of the lyre is attributed either to Hermes or to Apollo himself. Distinctions have been made that Hermes invented lyre made of tortoise shell, whereas the lyre Apollo invented was a regular lyre.

The Homeric Hymn to Hermes tells that the infant Hermes stole a number of Apollo's cows and took them to a cave in the woods near Pylos, covering their tracks. In the cave, he found a tortoise and killed it, then removed the insides. He used seven gut strings from sheep and the tortoise shell and made his lyre.

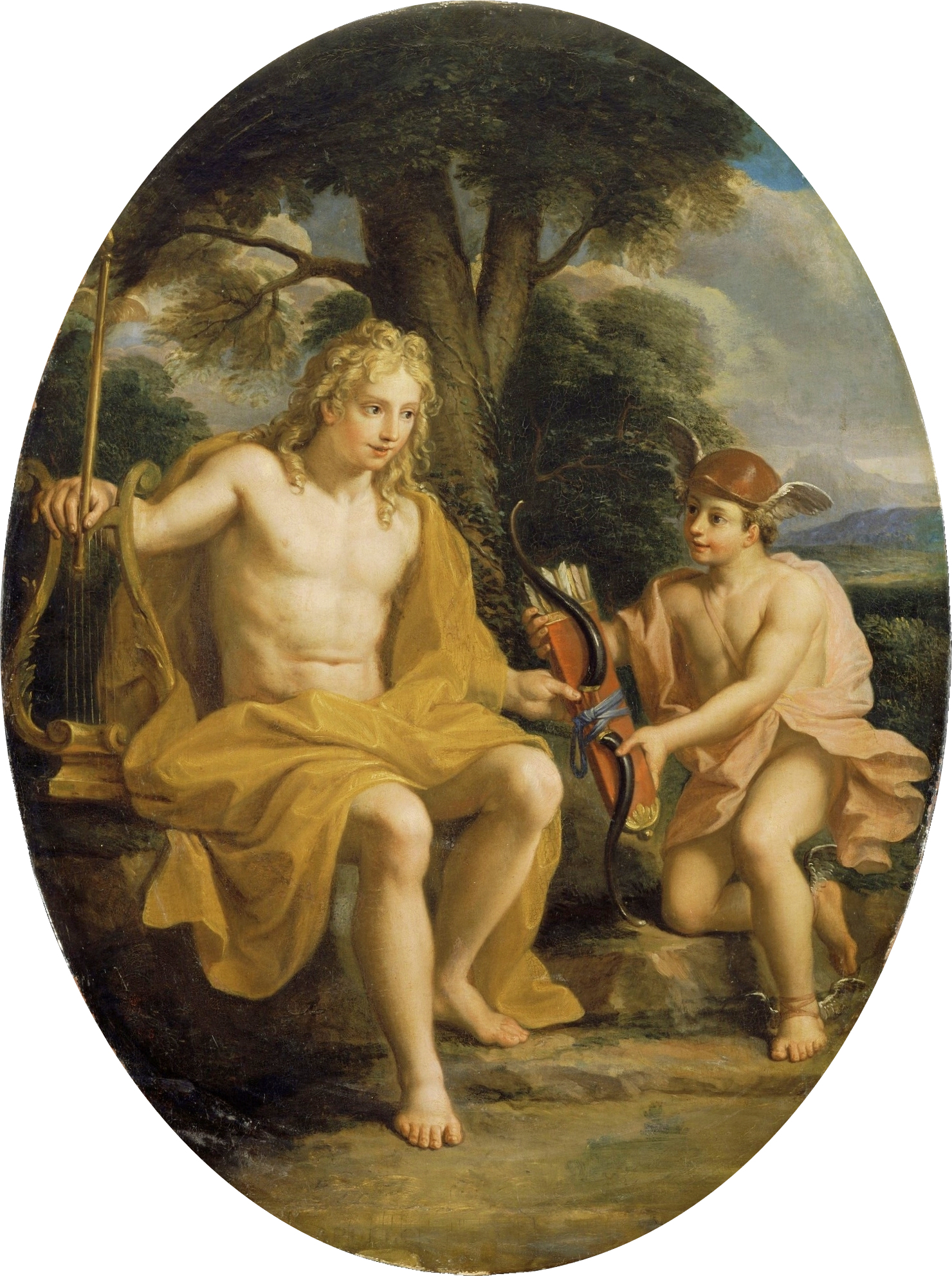
The friendship of Apollo and Hermes, by Noël Coypel

Upon discovering the theft, Apollo confronted Hermes and asked him to return his cattle. When Hermes acted innocent, Apollo took the matter to Zeus. Zeus, having seen the events, sided with Apollo, and ordered Hermes to return the cattle. Hermes then began to play music on the lyre he had invented. Apollo fell in love with the instrument and offered to exchange the cattle for the lyre. Hence, Apollo then became the master of the lyre.

According to other versions, Apollo had invented the lyre himself, whose strings he tore in repenting of the excess punishment he had given to Marsyas. Hermes's lyre, therefore, would be a reinvention.

==== Musical contests ====
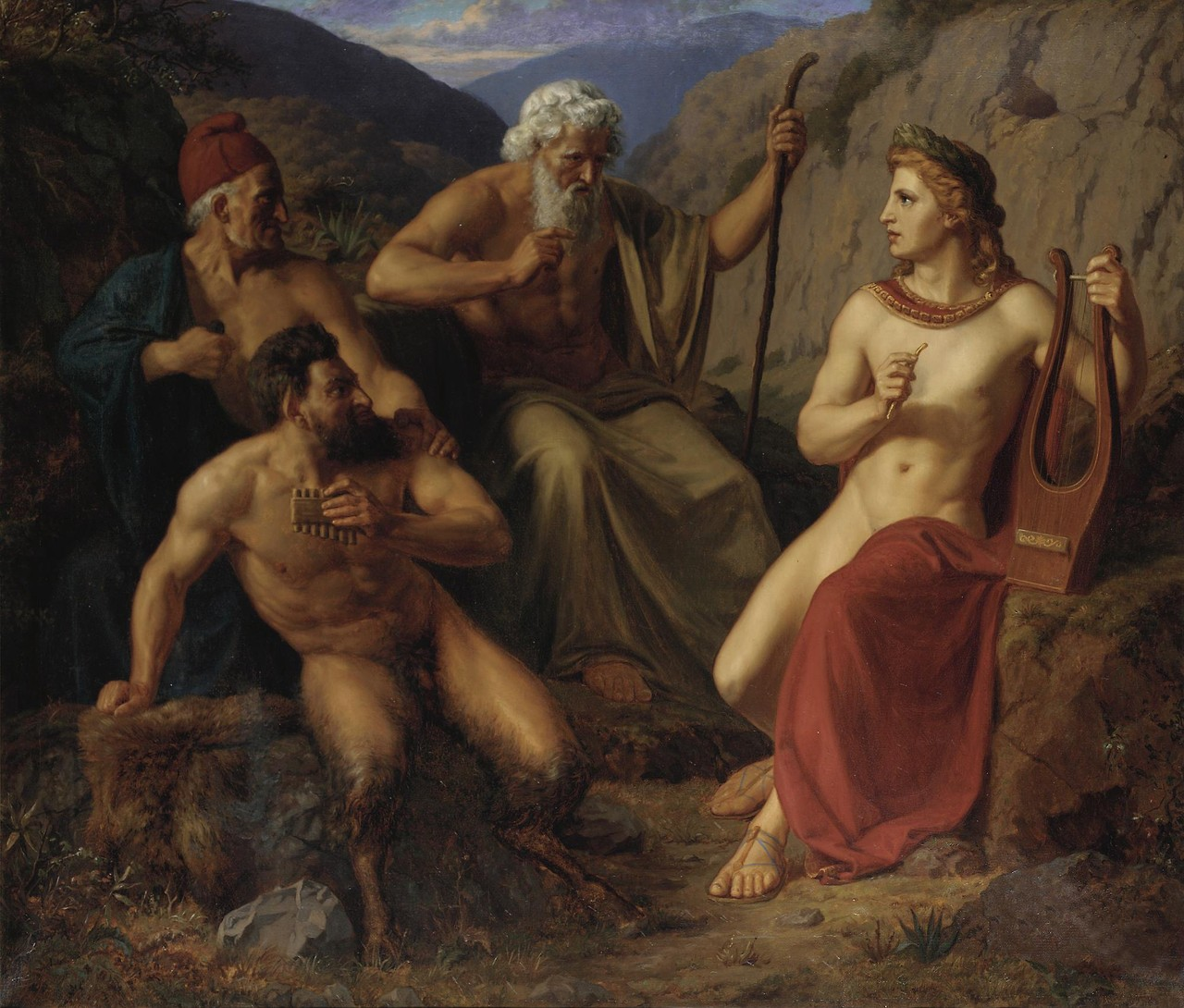
The musical duel of Pan and Apollo, by Laurits Tuxen

Once Pan had the audacity to compare his music with that of Apollo and to challenge the god of music to a contest. The mountain-god Tmolus was chosen to umpire. Pan blew on his pipes, and with his rustic melody gave great satisfaction to himself and his faithful follower, Midas, who happened to be present. Then, Apollo struck the strings of his lyre. It was so beautiful that Tmolus at once awarded the victory to Apollo, and everyone was pleased with the judgement. Only Midas dissented and questioned the justice of the award. Apollo did not want to suffer such a depraved pair of ears any longer, and caused them to become the ears of a donkey.

Marsyas was a satyr who was punished by Apollo for his hubris; he thought he was better than the god, and challenged him to a musical contest. This contest was judged by the Muses, or the nymphs of Nysa. Marsyas taunted Apollo for "wearing his hair long, for having a fair face and smooth body, for his skill in so many arts". The contestants agreed to take turns displaying their skills and the rule was that the victor could "do whatever he wanted" to the loser.

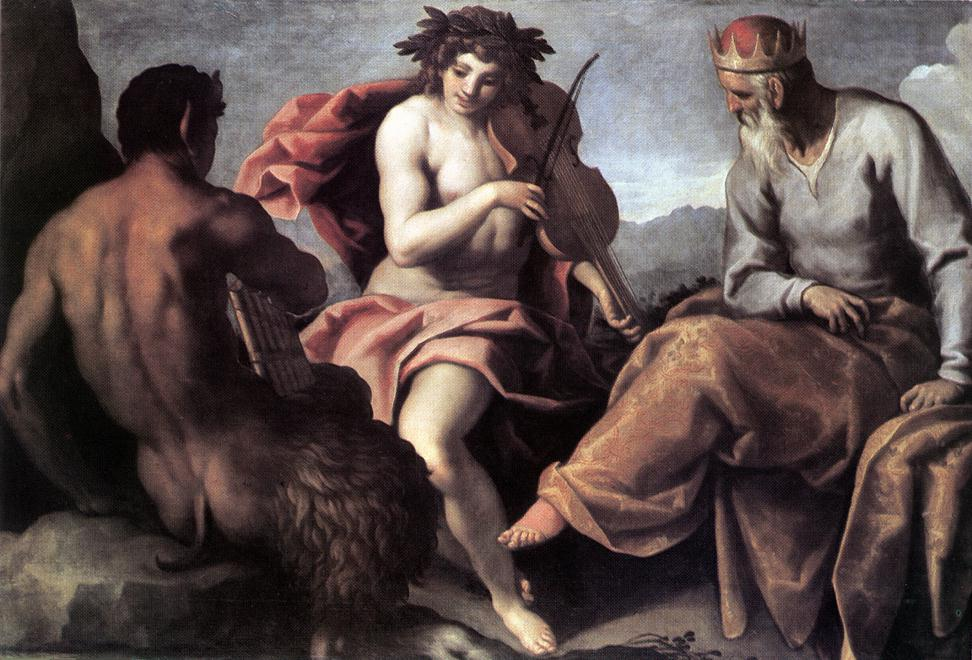
The contest between Apollo and Marsyas, by Palma il Giovane

According to one account, after the first round, they both were deemed equal by the Nysiads. But in the next round, Apollo decided to play on his lyre and add his melodious voice to his performance. Marsyas argued against this, saying that Apollo would have an advantage and accused Apollo of cheating. But Apollo replied that since Marsyas played the flute, which needed air blown from the throat, it was similar to singing, and that either they both should get an equal chance to combine their skills or none of them should use their mouths at all. The nymphs decided that Apollo's argument was just. Apollo then played his lyre and sang at the same time, mesmerising the audience. Marsyas could not do this. Apollo was declared the winner and, angered with Marsyas's haughtiness and his accusations, decided to flay the satyr.

According to another account, Marsyas played his flute out of tune at one point and accepted his defeat. Out of shame, he assigned to himself the punishment of being skinned for a wine sack. Another variation is that Apollo played his instrument upside down. Marsyas could not do this with his instrument. So the Muses who were the judges declared Apollo the winner. Apollo hung Marsyas from a tree to flay him.

Apollo flayed the limbs of Marsyas alive in a cave near Celaenae in Phrygia for his hubris to challenge a god. He then gave the rest of his body for proper burial and nailed Marsyas's flayed skin to a nearby pine-tree as a lesson to the others. Marsyas's blood turned into the river Marsyas. But Apollo soon repented and being distressed at what he had done, he tore the strings of his lyre and threw it away. The lyre was later discovered by the Muses and Apollo's sons Linus and Orpheus. The Muses fixed the middle string, Linus the string struck with the forefinger, and Orpheus the lowest string and the one next to it. They took it back to Apollo, but the god, who had decided to stay away from music for a while, laid away both the lyre and the pipes at Delphi and joined Cybele in her wanderings to as far as Hyperborea.

Agamemnon invoked Apollo against Cinyras, a ruler of Cyprus, asking the god to avenge a broken promise. Apollo then had a lyre-playing contest with Cinyras, defeating him. Cinyras either committed suicide when he lost or was killed by Apollo.

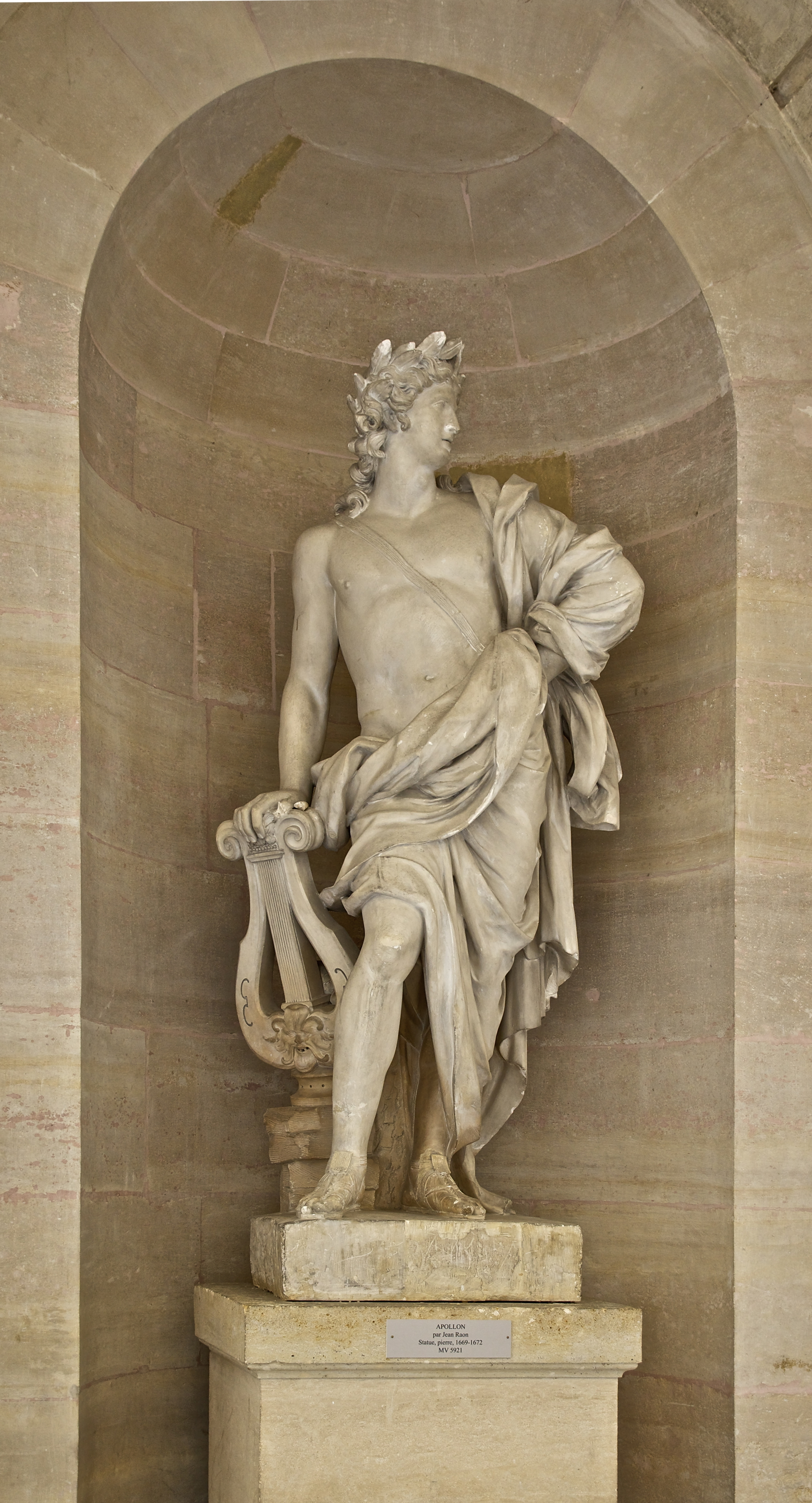
Apollon Raon, Versailles

=== Patron of sailors ===
Apollo functions as the patron and protector of sailors, one of the duties he shares with Poseidon. When Apollo spotted a ship of Cretan sailors that were caught in a storm, he quickly assumed the shape of a dolphin and guided their ship safely to Delphi. When the Argonauts faced a terrible storm, Jason prayed to his patron, Apollo, to help them. Apollo used his bow and golden arrow to shed light upon an island, where the Argonauts soon took shelter. This island was renamed "Anaphe", which means "He revealed it". Apollo helped the Greek hero Diomedes, to escape from a great tempest during his journey homeward. As a token of gratitude, Diomedes built a temple in honor of Apollo under the epithet Epibaterius ("the embarker"). During the Trojan War, Odysseus came to the Trojan camp to return Chriseis, the daughter of Apollo's priest Chryses, and brought many offerings to Apollo. Pleased with this, Apollo sent gentle breezes that helped Odysseus return safely to the Greek camp.

=== Wars ===
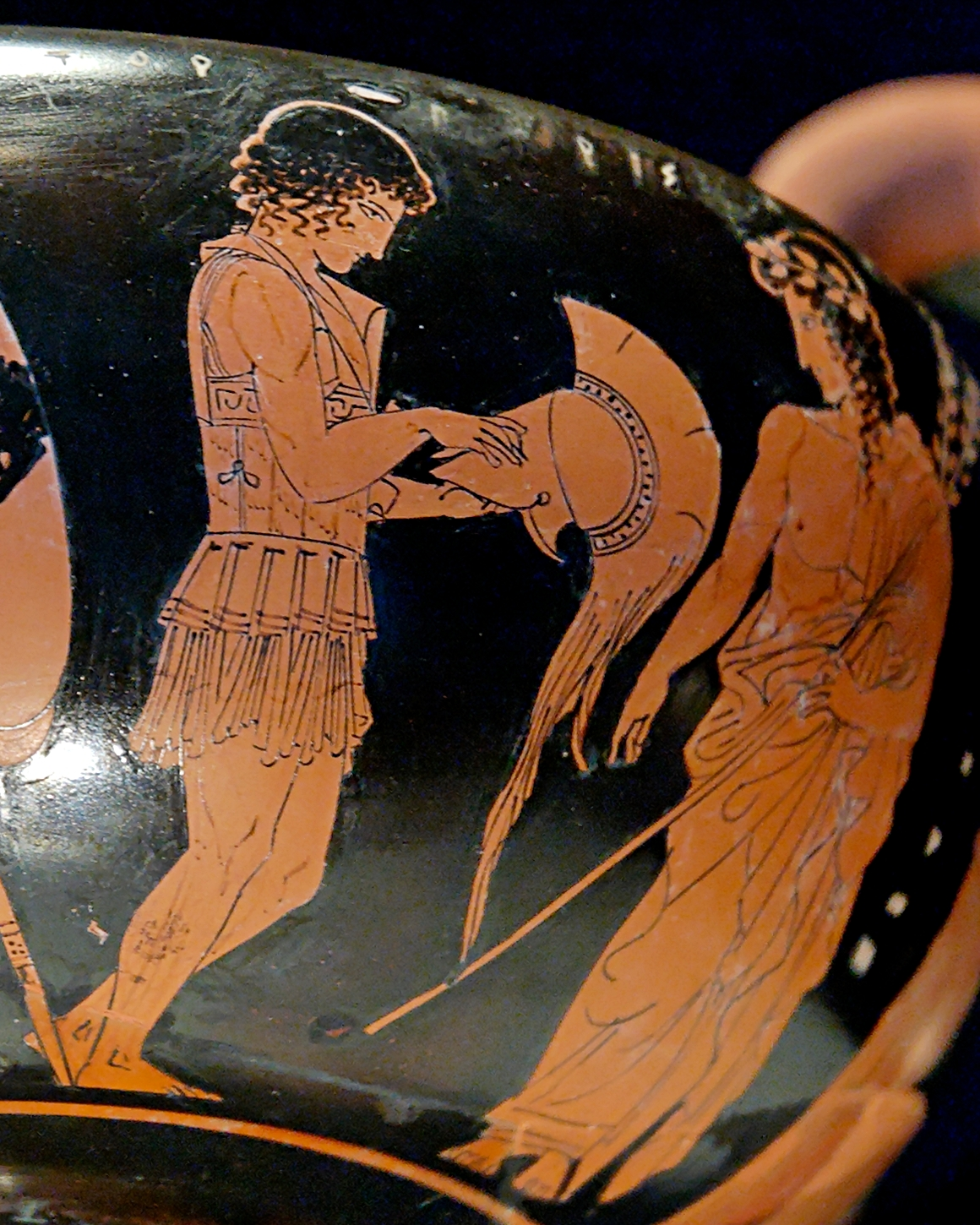
Paris (on the left) putting on his armour as Apollo (on the right) watches him. Attic red-figure kantharos, 425–420 BC

When Zeus suggested that Dionysus defeat the Indians in order to earn a place among the gods, Dionysus declared war against the Indians and travelled to India along with his army of Bacchantes and satyrs. Among the warriors was Aristaeus, Apollo's son. Apollo armed his son with his own hands and gave him a bow and arrows and fitted a strong shield to his arm. After Zeus urged Apollo to join the war, he went to the battlefield. Seeing several of his nymphs and Aristaeus drowning in a river, he took them to safety and healed them. He taught Aristaeus more useful healing arts and sent him back to help the army of Dionysus.

During the war between the sons of Oedipus, Apollo favored Amphiaraus, a seer and one of the leaders in the war. Though saddened that the seer was fated to be doomed in the war, Apollo made Amphiaraus's last hours glorious by "lighting his shield and his helm with starry gleam". When Hypseus tried to kill the hero with a spear, Apollo directed the spear towards the charioteer of Amphiaraus instead. Apollo then replaced the charioteer and took the reins in his hands. He deflected many spears and arrows away from them. He also killed many of the enemy warriors like Melaneus, Antiphus, Aetion, Polites and Lampus. At last, when the moment of departure came, Apollo expressed his grief with tears in his eyes and bid farewell to Amphiaraus, who was soon engulfed by the Earth.

During the Gigantomachy, Apollo and Heracles blinded the giant Ephialtes by shooting him in his eyes, Apollo shooting his left and Heracles his right. He also killed Porphyrion, the king of giants, using his bow and arrows.

The Aloadae, namely Otis and Ephialtes, were twin giants who decided to wage war upon the gods. They attempted to storm Mt. Olympus by piling up mountains, and threatened to fill the sea with mountains and inundate dry land. They even dared to seek the hand of Hera and Artemis in marriage. Angered by this, Apollo killed them by shooting them with arrows. According to another tale, Apollo killed them by sending a deer between them; as they tried to kill it with their javelins, they accidentally stabbed each other and died.

Phorbas was a savage giant king of Phlegyas, described as having swine-like features. He wished to plunder Delphi for its wealth, and captured its old people and children, sending them to his army to hold them for ransom. He challenged the young and sturdy men to a boxing match, only to behead them when they were defeated; he hung the decapitated heads to an oak tree. Finally, Apollo entered a boxing contest with Phorbas and killed him with a single blow.

=== Other stories ===
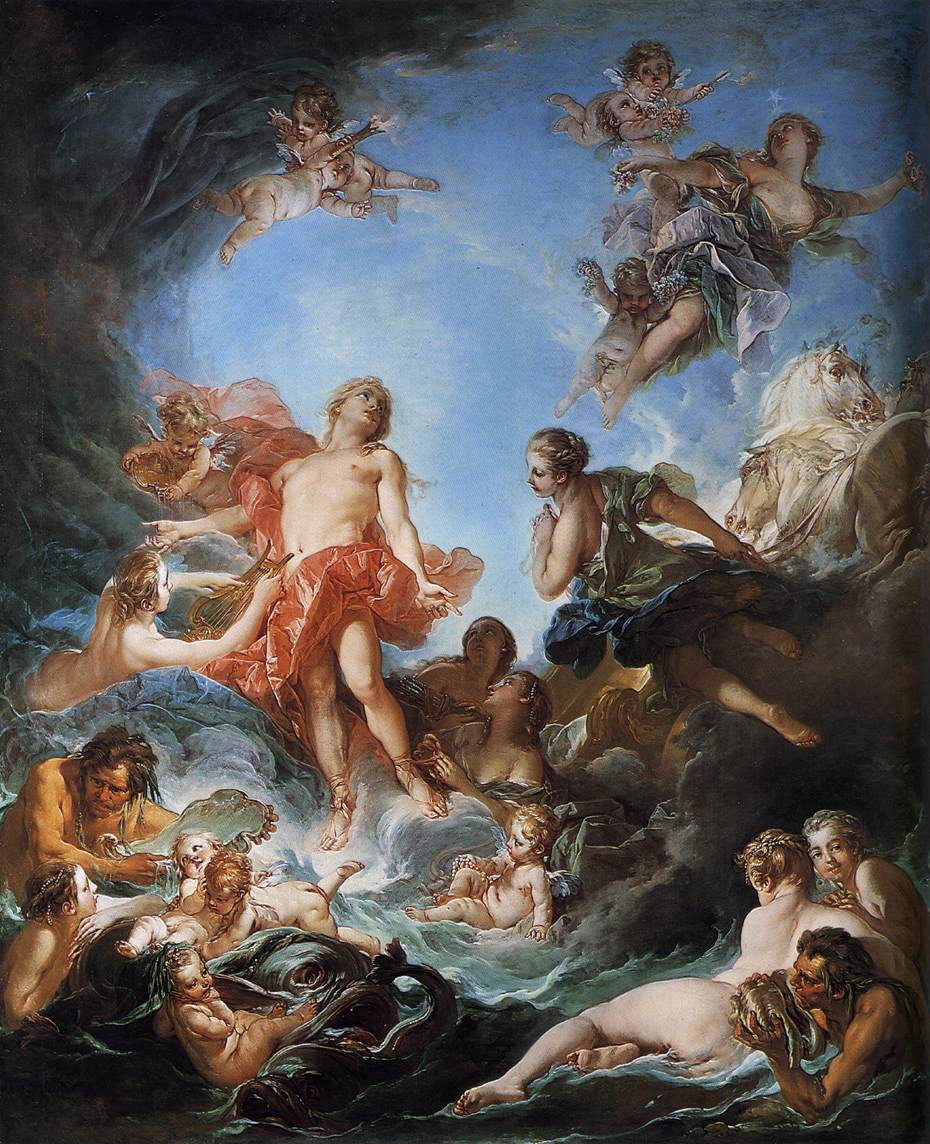
Apollo as the rising sun, by François Boucher

In the first Olympic games, Apollo defeated Ares and became the victor in wrestling. He outran Hermes in the race and won first place.

Apollo divides months into summer and winter. He rides on the back of a swan to the land of the Hyperboreans during the winter months, and the absence of warmth in winter is due to his departure. During his absence, Delphi was under the care of Dionysus, and no prophecies were given during winters.

==== Molpadia and Parthenos ====
Molpadia and Parthenos were the sisters of Rhoeo, a former lover of Apollo. One day, they were put in charge of watching their father's ancestral wine jar but they fell asleep while performing this duty. While they were asleep, the wine jar was broken by the swine their family kept. When the sisters woke up and saw what had happened, they threw themselves off a cliff in fear of their father's wrath. Apollo, who was passing by, caught them and carried them to two different cities in Chersonesus, Molpadia to Castabus and Parthenos to Bubastus. He turned them into goddesses and they both received divine honors. Molpadia's name was changed to Hemithea upon her deification.

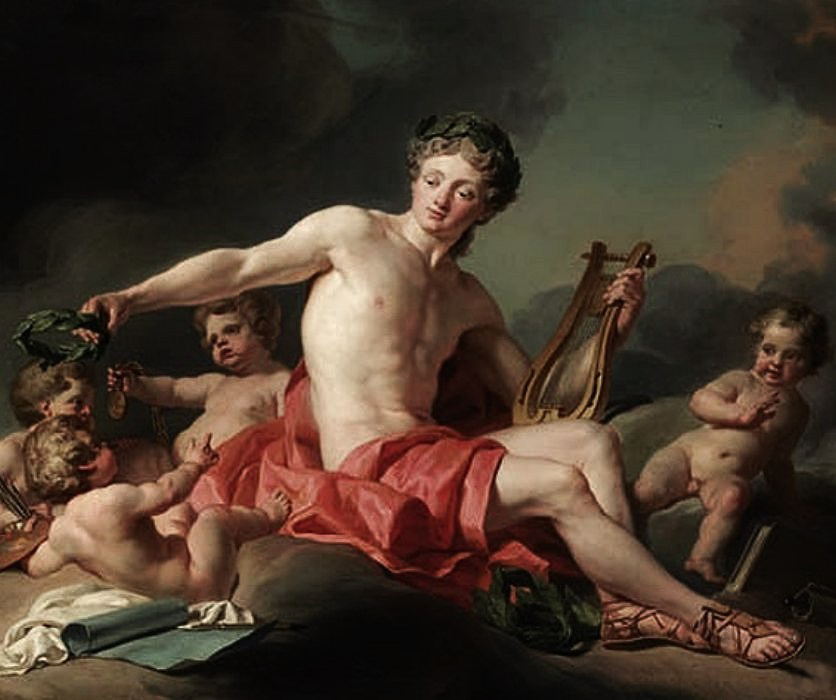
Apollo crowning the arts, by Nicolas-Guy Brenet

==== Heracles ====
After Heracles (then named Alcides) was struck with madness and killed his family, he sought to purify himself and consulted the oracle of Apollo. Apollo, through the Pythia, commanded him to serve Eurystheus, king of Mycenae, for twelve years and complete the ten tasks the king would give him. Only then would Alcides be absolved of his sin. Apollo also renamed him Heracles.

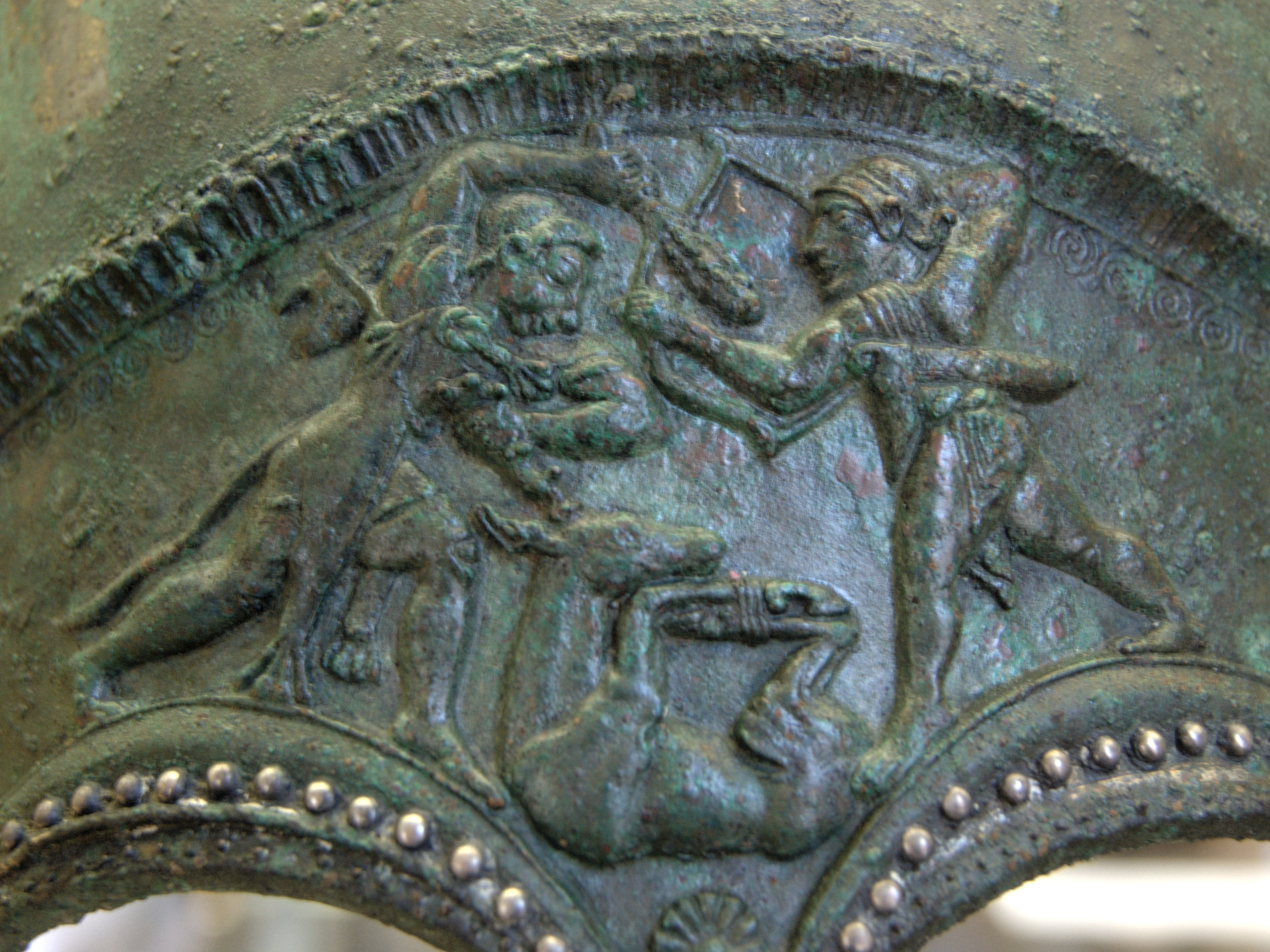
Heracles and Apollo struggling over the hind, as depicted on a Corinthian helmet (early 5th century BC)

To complete his third task, Heracles had to capture the Ceryneian Hind, a hind sacred to Artemis, and bring back it alive. After chasing the hind for one year, the animal eventually got tired, and when it tried crossing the river Ladon, Heracles captured it. While he was taking it back, he was confronted by Apollo and Artemis, who were angered at Heracles for this act. However, Heracles soothed the goddess and explained his situation to her. After much pleading, Artemis permitted him to take the hind and told him to return it later.

After he was freed from his servitude to Eurystheus, Heracles fell in conflict with Iphytus, a prince of Oechalia, and murdered him. Soon after, he contracted a terrible disease. He consulted the oracle of Apollo once again, in the hope of ridding himself of the disease. The Pythia, however, denied to give any prophesy. In anger, Heracles snatched the sacred tripod and started walking away, intending to start his own oracle. However, Apollo did not tolerate this and stopped Heracles; a duel ensued between them. Artemis rushed to support Apollo, while Athena supported Heracles. Soon, Zeus threw his thunderbolt between the fighting brothers and separated them. He reprimanded Heracles for this act of violation and asked Apollo to give a solution to Heracles. Apollo then ordered the hero to serve under Omphale, queen of Lydia for one year in order to purify himself.

After their reconciliation, Apollo and Heracles together founded the city of Gythion.

==== The rock of Leukas ====
Leukatas was believed to be a white-colored rock jutting out from the island of Leukas into the sea. It was present in the sanctuary of Apollo Leukates. A leap from this rock was believed to have put an end to the longings of love.

Once, Aphrodite fell deeply in love with Adonis, a young man of great beauty who was later accidentally killed by a boar. Heartbroken, Aphrodite wandered looking for the rock of Leukas. When she reached the sanctuary of Apollo in Argos, she confided in him her love and sorrow. Apollo then brought her to the rock of Leukas and asked her to throw herself from the top of the rock. She did so and was freed from her love. When she sought the reason behind this, Apollo told her that Zeus, before taking another lover, would sit on this rock to free himself from his love for Hera.

It was an ancestral custom among the Leukadians to fling a criminal from this rock every year at the sacrifice performed in honor of Apollo for the sake of averting evil. However, a number of men would be stationed all around below rock to catch the criminal and take him out of the borders in order to exile him from the island. This was the same rock from which, according to a legend, Sappho took her suicidal leap.

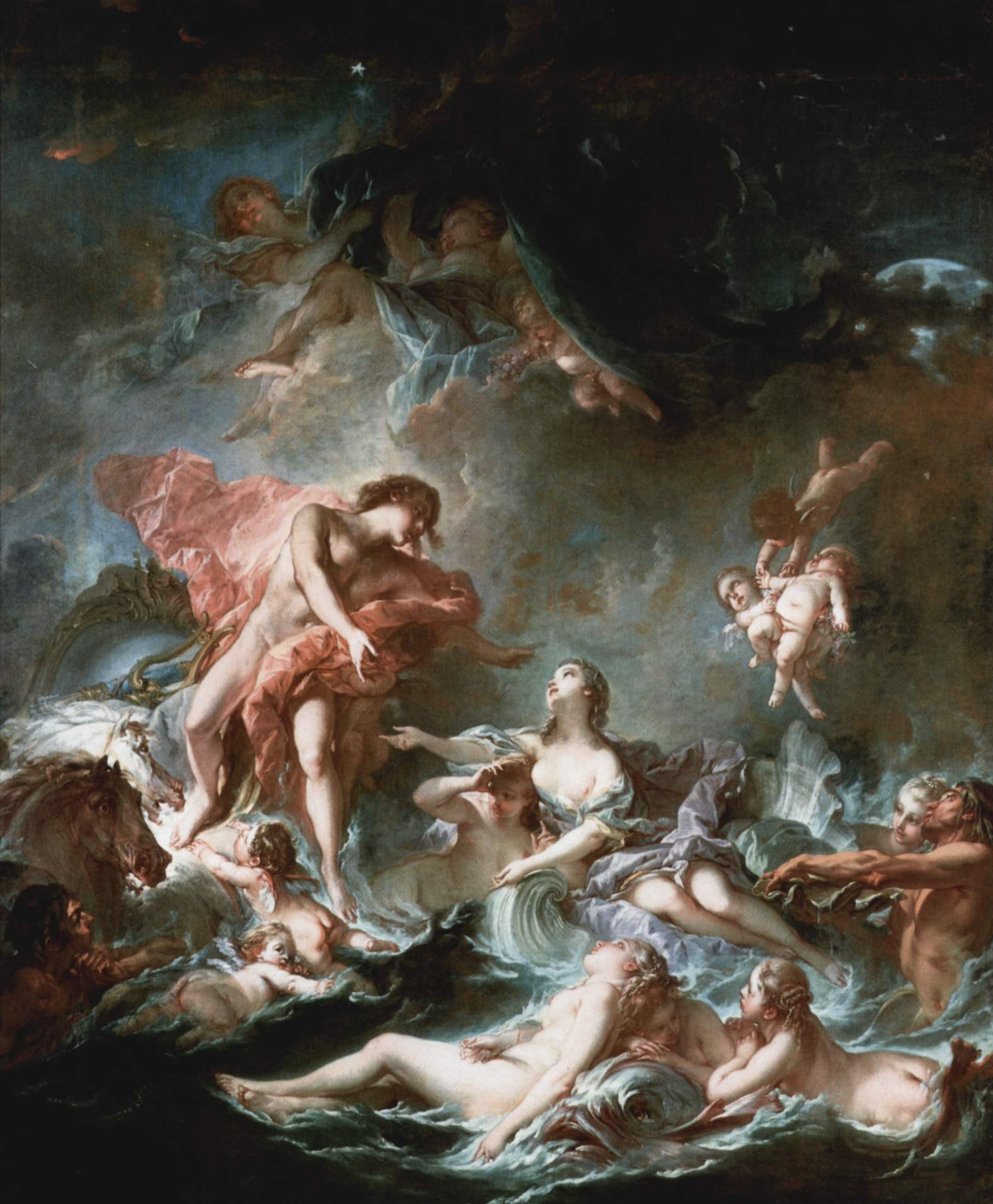
Apollo as the setting sun, by François Boucher

=== Female lovers ===
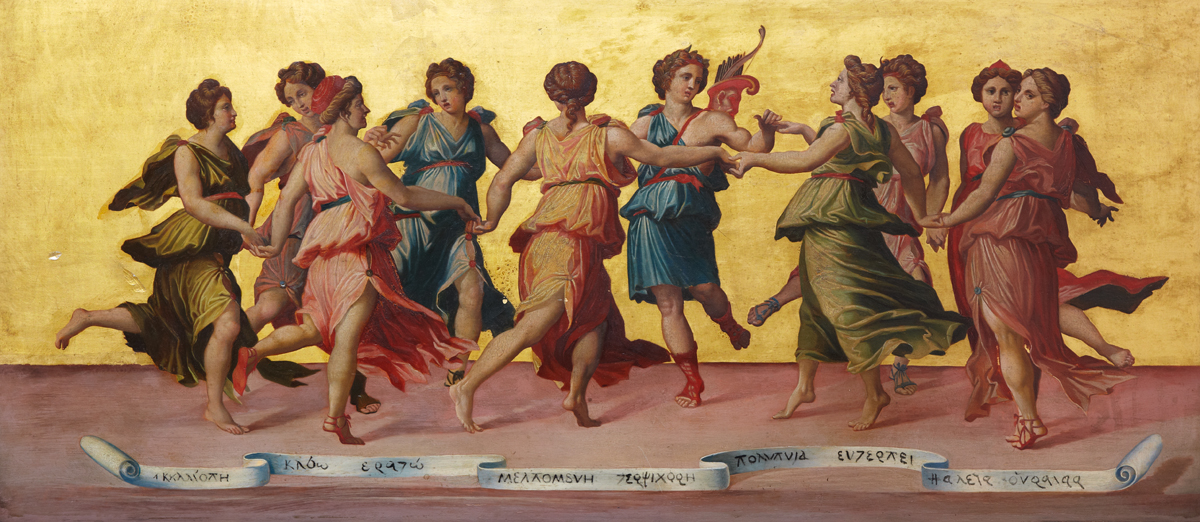
Apollo and the Muses, by Robert Sanderson

Apollo fathered the Corybantes by the Muse Thalia. By Calliope, he had Hymenaios, Ialemus, Orpheus and Linus. Alternatively, Linus was said to be the son of Apollo and either Urania or Terpsichore.

In the Great Eoiae that is attributed to Hesiod, Scylla is the daughter of Apollo and Hecate.

Cyrene was a Thessalian princess whom Apollo loved. In her honor, he built the city Cyrene and made her its ruler. She was later granted longevity by Apollo who turned her into a nymph. The couple had two sons, Aristaeus, and Idmon.

Evadne was a nymph daughter of Poseidon and a lover of Apollo. They had a son, Iamos. During the time of the childbirth, Apollo sent Eileithyia, the goddess of childbirth to assist her.

Rhoeo, a princess of the island of Naxos was loved by Apollo. Out of affection for her, Apollo turned her sisters into goddesses. On the island Delos she bore Apollo a son named Anius. Not wanting to have the child, she entrusted the infant to Apollo and left. Apollo raised and educated the child on his own.

Ourea, a daughter of Poseidon, fell in love with Apollo when he and Poseidon were serving the Trojan king Laomedon. They both united on the day the walls of Troy were built. She bore to Apollo a son, whom Apollo named Ileus, after the city of his birth, Ilion (Troy). Ileus was very dear to Apollo.

Thero, daughter of Phylas, a maiden as beautiful as the moonbeams, was loved by the radiant Apollo, and she loved him in return. Through their union, she became the mother of Chaeron, who was famed as "the tamer of horses". He later built the city Chaeronea.

Hyrie or Thyrie was the mother of Cycnus. Apollo turned both the mother and son into swans when they jumped into a lake and tried to kill themselves.

Hecuba was the wife of King Priam of Troy, and Apollo had a son with her named Troilus. An oracle prophesied that Troy would not be defeated as long as Troilus reached the age of twenty alive. He was ambushed and killed by Achilleus, and Apollo avenged his death by killing Achilles. After the sack of Troy, Hecuba was taken to Lycia by Apollo.

Coronis was daughter of Phlegyas, King of the Lapiths. While pregnant with Asclepius, Coronis fell in love with Ischys, son of Elatus and slept with him. When Apollo found out about her infidelity through his prophetic powers or thanks to his raven who informed him, he sent his sister, Artemis, to kill Coronis. Apollo rescued the baby by cutting open Coronis's belly and gave it for Chiron to raise.

Dryope, the daughter of Dryops, was impregnated by Apollo in the form of a snake. She gave birth to a son named Amphissus.

In Euripides's play Ion, Apollo fathered Ion by Creusa, wife of Xuthus. He used his powers to conceal her pregnancy from her father. Later, when Creusa left Ion to die in the wild, Apollo asked Hermes to save the child and bring him to the oracle at Delphi, where he was raised by a priestess.

Apollo loved and kidnapped an Oceanid nymph, Melia. Her father Oceanus sent one of his sons, Caanthus, to find her, but Caanthus could not take her back from Apollo, so he burned Apollo's sanctuary. In retaliation, Apollo shot and killed Caanthus.

=== Male lovers ===
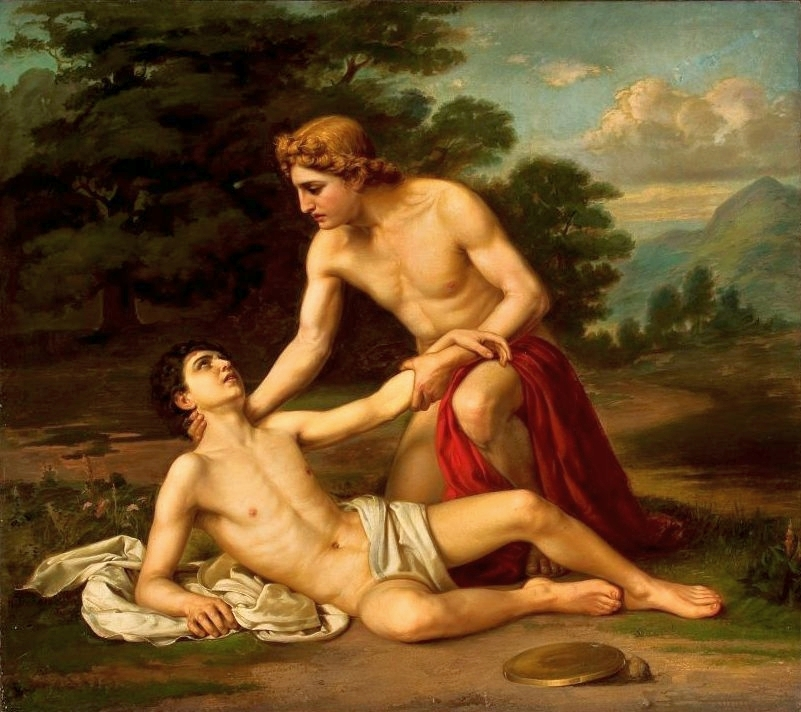
Death of Hyacinth, by Alexander Kiselyov, 1850–1900

Hyacinth (or Hyacinthus), a beautiful and athletic Spartan prince, was one of Apollo's favourite lovers. The pair was practicing throwing the discus when a discus thrown by Apollo was blown off course by the jealous Zephyrus and struck Hyacinthus in the head, killing him instantly. Apollo is said to be filled with grief. Out of Hyacinthus's blood, Apollo created a flower named after him as a memorial to his death, and his tears stained the flower petals with the interjection αἰαῖ, meaning alas. He was later resurrected and taken to heaven. The festival Hyacinthia was a national celebration of Sparta, which commemorated the death and rebirth of Hyacinthus.

Another male lover was Cyparissus, a descendant of Heracles. Apollo gave him a tame deer as a companion but Cyparissus accidentally killed it with a javelin as it lay asleep in the undergrowth. Cyparissus was so saddened by its death that he asked Apollo to let his tears fall forever. Apollo granted the request by turning him into the Cypress named after him, which was said to be a sad tree because the sap forms droplets like tears on the trunk.

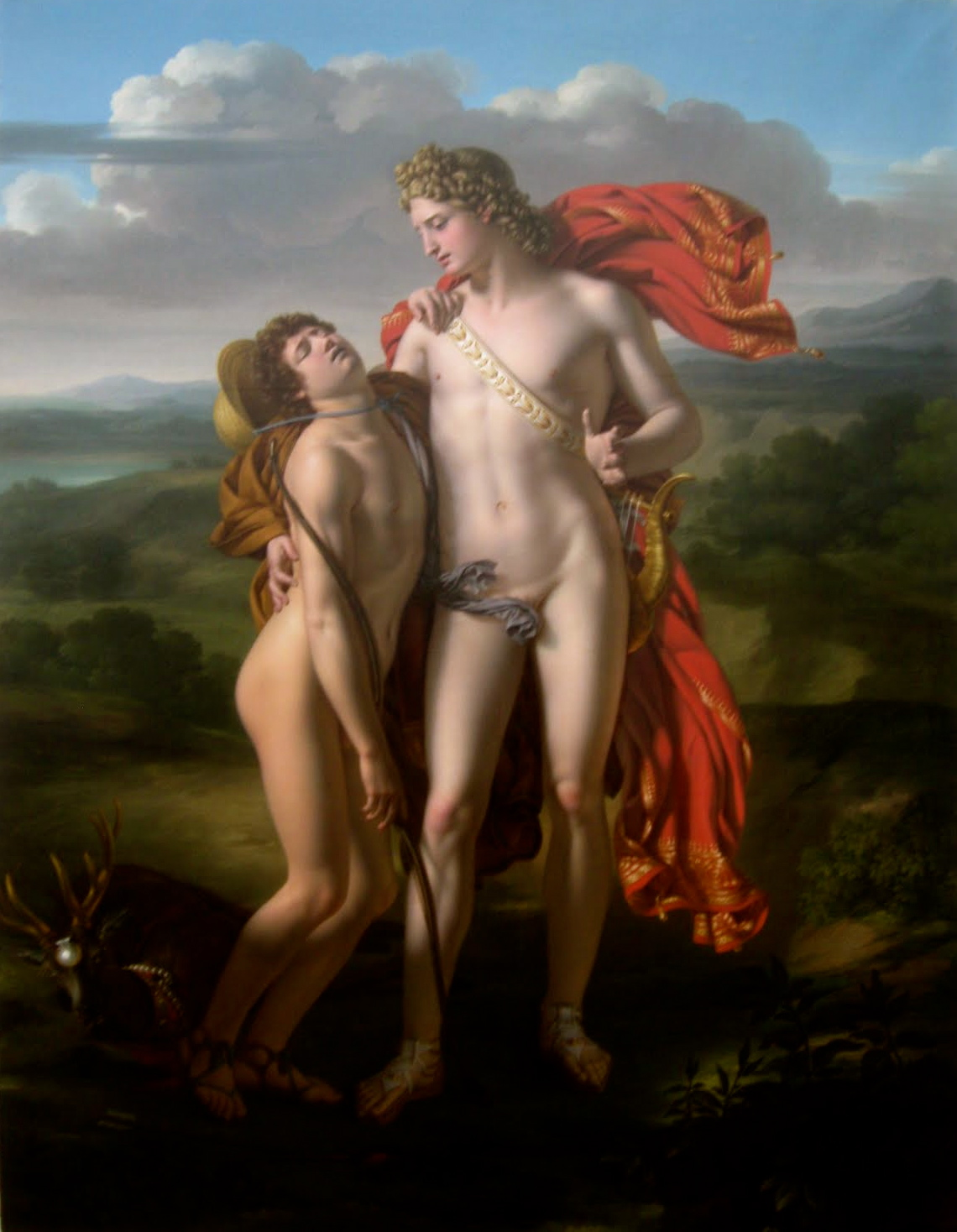
Apollo and Cyparissus, by Jean-Pierre Granger (1779–1840)

Admetus, the king of Pherae, was also Apollo's lover. During his exile, Apollo served Admetus as a herdsman. The romantic nature of their relationship was first described by Callimachus, who wrote that Apollo was "fired with love" for Admetus. Plutarch lists Admetus as one of Apollo's lovers and says that Apollo served Admetus because he doted upon him. The Latin poet Ovid in his Ars Amatoria said that even though he was a god, Apollo forsook his pride and stayed in as a servant for the sake of Admetus. Tibullus describes Apollo's love to the king as servitium amoris (slavery of love) and asserts that Apollo became his servant not by force but by choice. He would also make cheese and serve it to Admetus. His domestic actions caused embarrassment to his family.

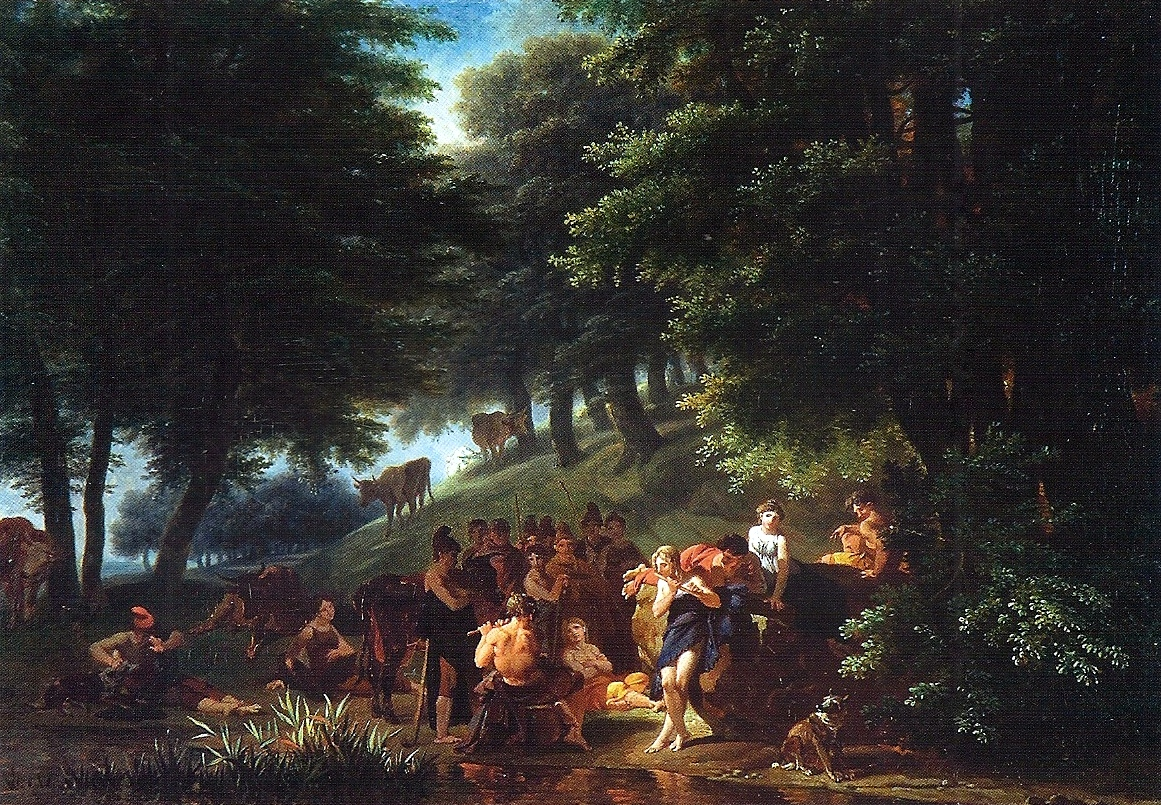
Apollo visiting Admetus, by Nicolas-Antoine Taunay, 19th century

Oh how often his sister (Diana) blushed at meeting her brother as he carried a young calf through the fields!....often Latona lamented when she saw her son's disheveled locks which were admired even by Juno, his step-mother...

When Admetus wanted to marry princess Alcestis, Apollo provided a chariot pulled by a lion and a boar he had tamed. This satisfied Alcestis's father and he let Admetus marry his daughter. Further, Apollo saved the king from Artemis's wrath and also convinced the Moirai to allow Admetus to escape his death if someone else voluntarily died in his place.

Branchus, a shepherd, one day came across Apollo in the woods. Captivated by the god's beauty, he kissed Apollo. Apollo requited his affections and wanting to reward him, bestowed prophetic skills on him. His descendants, the Branchides, were an influential clan of prophets.

Other male lovers of Apollo include:

- Adonis, who is said to have been the lover of both Apollo and Aphrodite. He behaved as a man with Aphrodite and as a woman with Apollo.
- Atymnius, otherwise known as a beloved of Sarpedon
- Boreas, the god of North winds
- Cinyras, king of Cyprus and the priest of Aphrodite
- Helenus, a Trojan prince (son of Priam and Hecuba). He received from Apollo an ivory bow with which he later wounded Achilles in the hand.
- Hippolytus of Sicyon (not the same as Hippolytus, the son of Theseus)
- Hymenaios, the son of Magnes
- Iapis, to whom Apollo taught the art of healing
- Paris, a Trojan prince and son of Priam. Apollo fell in love with him and taught him archery.
- Phorbas, the dragon slayer (probably the son of Triopas)

=== Children ===
Apollo sired many children, by mortal women, nymphs, and goddesses. Asclepius, one of his sons, was killed by Zeus for bringing back the dead, but was resurrected as a god upon Apollo's request. Aristaeus, another of his sons, was placed under the care of Chiron after his birth, and became the god of beekeeping, cheese-making, animal husbandry, among other functions. He was ultimately given immortality for the benefits he bestowed upon humanity.

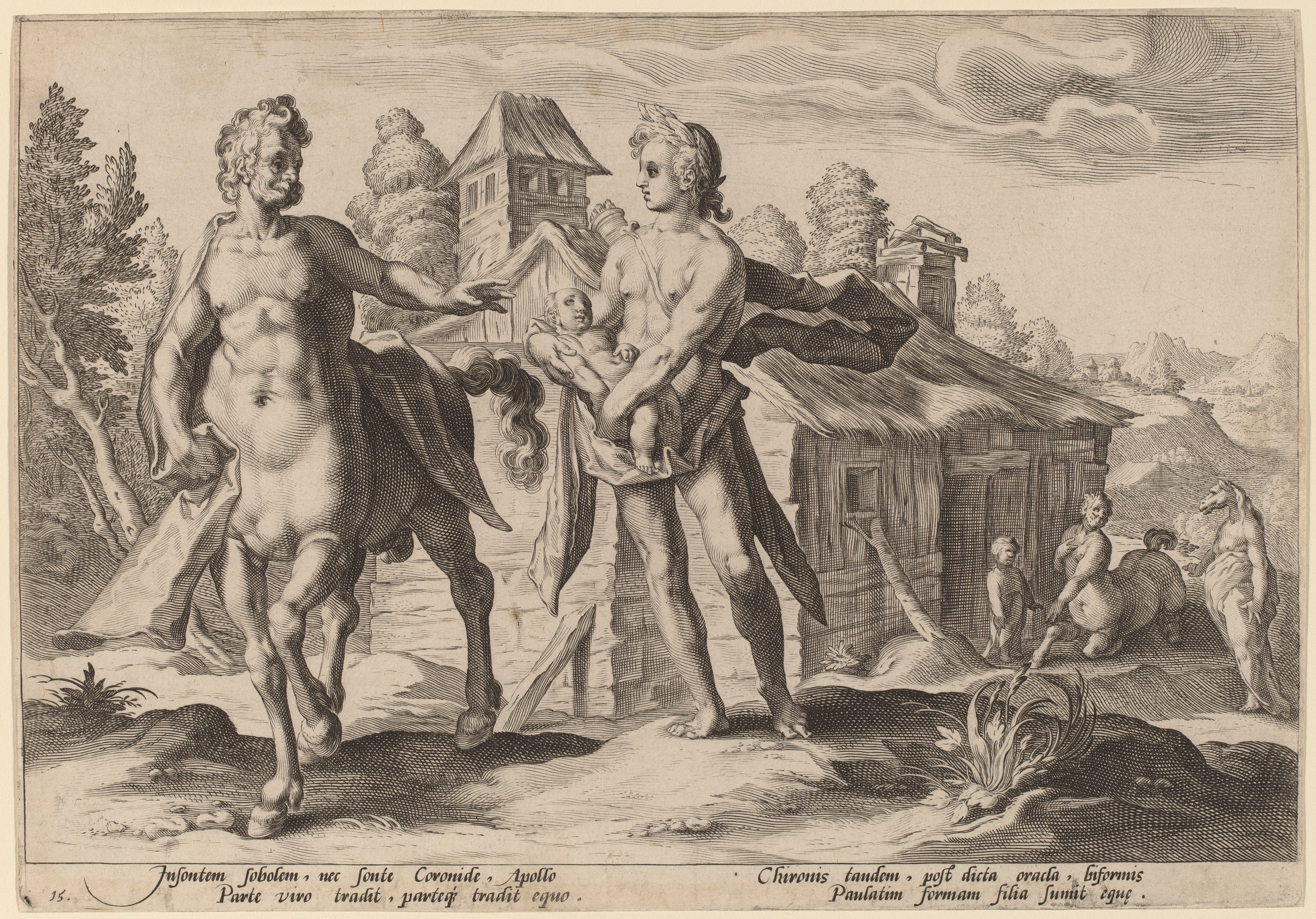
Apollo entrusting Chiron with the education of Aescalapius

The sons of Apollo who participated in the Trojan War include the Trojan princes Hector and Troilus, as well as Tenes, the king of Tenedos, all three of whom were killed by Achilles over the course of the war.

Apollo's children who became musicians and bards include Orpheus, Linus, Ialemus, Hymenaeus, Philammon, Eumolpus and Eleuther. Apollo fathered 3 daughters, Apollonis, Borysthenis and Cephisso, who formed a group of minor Muses, the "Musa Apollonides".

He also had a son by Agathippe who was named Chrysorrhoas who was a mechanic artist. His other daughters include Eurynome, Chariclo wife of Chiron, Eurydice the wife of Orpheus, Eriopis, famous for her beautiful hair, Melite the heroine, Pamphile the silk weaver, Parthenos, and by some accounts, Phoebe, Hilyra and Scylla. Apollo turned Parthenos into a constellation after her early death.

Additionally, Apollo fostered and educated Chiron, who later became the greatest teacher and educated many demigods, including Apollo's sons. Apollo also fostered Carnus, the son of Zeus and Europa.

==== List of offspring and their mothers ====
The following is a list of Apollo's offspring, by various mothers. Beside each offspring, the earliest source to record the parentage is given, along with the century to which the source (in some cases approximately) dates.

Offspring	Mother	Source	Date
Amphithemis	Acacallis	Ap. Rhod.	3rd cent. BC
Miletus	Acacallis	Ant. Lib.	2nd/3rd cent. AD
Naxos	Acacallis		
Phylacides, Philander	Acacallis	Paus.	2nd cent. AD
Oaxes	Anchiale	Servius	4th/5th cent. AD
Eleuther	Aethusa	Apollod.	1st/2nd cent. AD
Chrysorrhoas	Agathippe	Ps.-Plut. Fluv.	2nd cent. AD
Linus	Alciope		
Miletus	Areia	Apollod.	1st/2nd cent. AD
Miletus	Deione	Ovid Met.	1st cent. AD
Eumolpus	Astycome		
Asclepius	Arsinoe	Apollod.	1st/2nd cent. AD
Eriopis	Arsinoe		
Arabus	Babylon	Pliny	1st cent. AD
Orpheus	Calliope	Apollod.	1st/2nd cent. AD
Ialemus	Calliope		
Linus	Calliope	Apollod.	1st/2nd cent. AD
Linus	Urania	Hyg. Fab.	1st cent. AD
Linus	Terpsichore	Suda	10th cent. AD
Delphus	Celaeno	Paus.	2nd cent. AD
Delphus	Melaina	Paus.	2nd cent. AD
Delphus	Thyia	Paus.	2nd cent. AD
Philammon	Chione	Ovid Met.	1st cent. AD
Philammon	Leuconoe	Hyg. Fab.	1st cent. AD
Philammon	Philonis	Pherecydes	5th cent. BC
Coronus	Chrysorthe	Paus.	2nd cent. AD
Parthenos	Chrysothemis	Hyg. De astr.	1st cent. BC/AD
Asclepius	Coronis	HH 19	7th/6th cent. BC
Lycorus	Corycia	Paus.	2nd cent. AD
Ion	Creusa	Euripides	5th cent. BC
Aristaeus	Cyrene	Hes. Cat.	6th cent. BC
Autuchos	Cyrene	Schol. Ap. Rh.	
Idmon	Cyrene		
The Curetes	Danais	Tzetzes	12th cent. AD
Dryops	Dia	Tzetzes	12th cent. AD
Amphissus	Dryope	Ant. Lib.	2nd/3rd cent. AD
Agreus	Euboea	Hyg. Fab.	1st cent. AD
Iamus	Evadne	Pindar	5th cent. BC
Amphiaraus	Hypermnestra	Hyg. Fab.	1st cent. AD
Hector	Hecuba	Stesichorus	6th cent. BC
Cycnus	Hyria	Ant. Lib.	2nd/3rd cent. AD
Icadius	Lycia	Servius	4th/5th cent. AD
Patarus	Lycia	Steph. Byz.	6th cent. AD
Mopsus	Manto	Strabo	1st cent. AD
Ismenus, Tenerus	Melia	Paus.	2nd cent. AD
Phagrus	Othreis	Ant. Lib.	2nd/3rd cent. AD
Cynnes	Parnethia		
Lycomedes	Parthenope	Paus.	2nd cent. AD
Cinyras	Pharnace		
Dorus, Laodocus, Polypoetes	Phthia	Apollod.	1st/2nd cent. AD
Tenes	Procleia	Apollod.	1st/2nd cent. AD
Linus	Psamathe	Paus.	2nd cent. AD
The Corybantes	Rhetia	Pherecydes	5th cent. BC
The Corybantes	Thalia	Apollod.	1st/2nd cent. AD
Anius	Rhoeo	Diod. Sic.	1st cent. BC
Ceos	Rhodoessa	Etym. M.	12th cent. AD
Cicon	Rhodope	Etym. M.	12th cent. AD
Syrus	Sinope	Plutarch	1st/2nd cent. AD
Centaurus, Lapithes	Stilbe	Diod. Sic.	1st cent. BC
Aineus	Stilbe		
Zeuxippus	Syllis	Paus.	2nd cent. AD
Hymenaeus	Terpsichore	Tzetzes	12th cent. AD
Hymenaeus	Clio		
Galeus	Themisto	Steph. Byz.	6th cent. AD
Chaeron	Thero	Paus.	2nd cent. AD
Ileus	Urea	Hyg. Fab.	1st cent. AD
Trophonius	Epicaste		
Acraepheus	No mother mentioned	Steph. Byz.	6th cent. AD
Chariclo	No mother mentioned	Schol. Pind.	
Erymanthus	No mother mentioned		
Marathus	No mother mentioned	Suda	10th cent. AD
Melaneus	No mother mentioned	Ant. Lib.	2nd/3rd cent. AD
Oncius	No mother mentioned	Paus.	2nd cent. AD
Phemonoe	No mother mentioned		
Pisus	No mother mentioned	Servius	4th/5th cent. AD
Cephisso, Apollonis, Borysthenis	No mother mentioned	Eumelus	
Troilus	No mother mentioned	Apollod.	1st/2nd cent. AD

=== Failed love attempts ===
Love affairs ascribed to Apollo are a late development in Greek mythology. Their vivid anecdotal qualities have made some of them favorites of painters since the Renaissance, the result being that they stand out more prominently in the modern imagination.

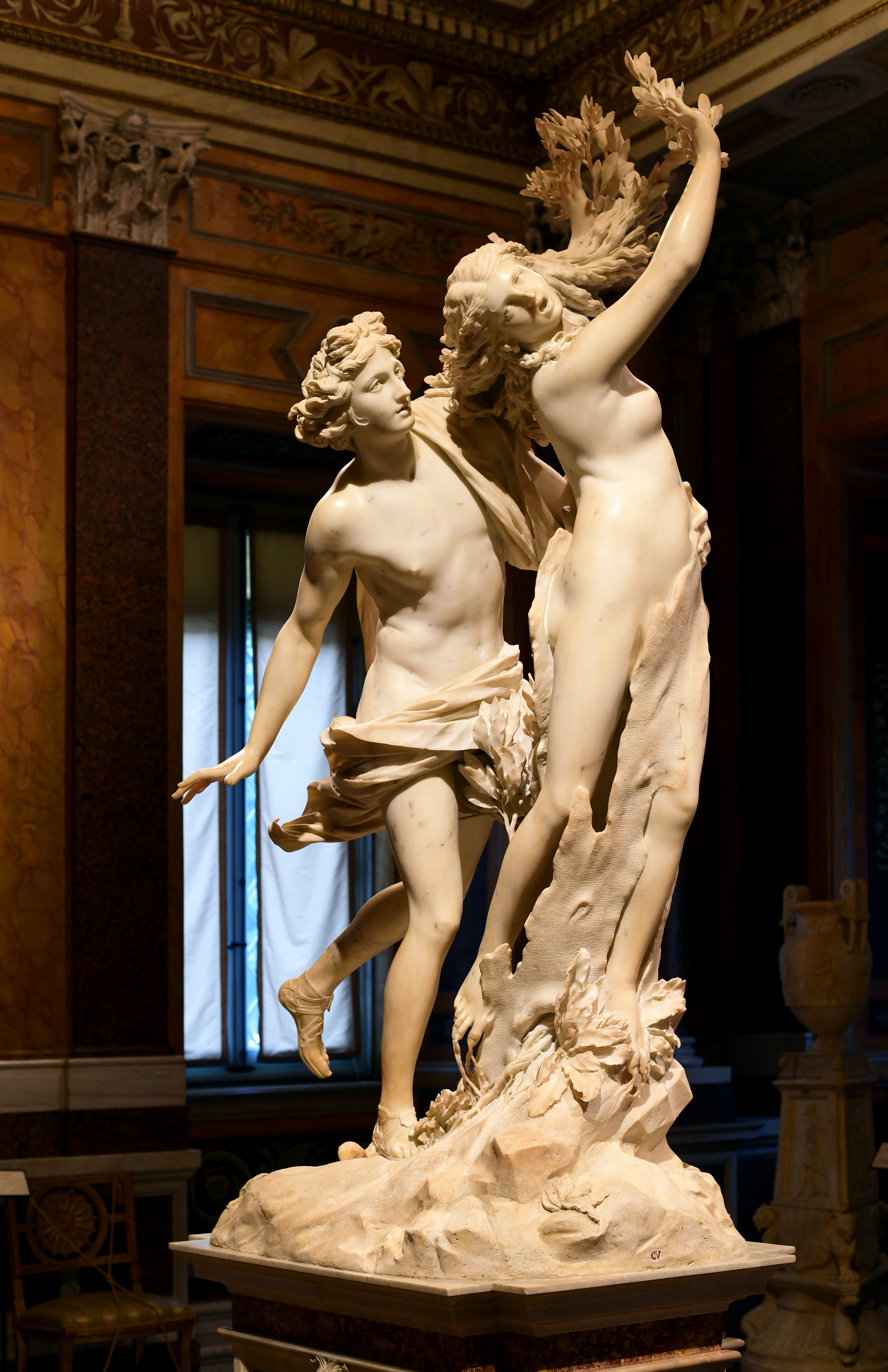
Apollo and Daphne by Bernini in the Galleria Borghese

Daphne was a nymph who scorned Apollo's advances and ran away from him. When Apollo chased her in order to persuade her, she changed herself into a laurel tree. According to other versions, she cried for help during the chase, and Gaia helped her by taking her in and placing a laurel tree in her place. According to Roman poet Ovid, the chase was brought about by Cupid, who hit Apollo with a golden arrow of love and Daphne with a leaden arrow of hatred. The myth explains the origin of the laurel and the connection of Apollo with the laurel and its leaves, which his priestess employed at Delphi. The leaves became the symbol of victory and laurel wreaths were given to the victors of the Pythian games.

Marpessa was kidnapped by Idas but was loved by Apollo as well. Zeus made her choose between them, and she chose Idas on the grounds that Apollo, being immortal, would tire of her when she grew old.

Sinope, a nymph, was approached by the amorous Apollo. She made him promise that he would grant to her whatever she would ask for, and then cleverly asked him to let her stay a virgin. Apollo kept his promise and went back.

Bolina was admired by Apollo but she refused him and jumped into the sea. To avoid her death, Apollo turned her into a nymph, saving her life.

Castalia was a nymph whom Apollo loved. She fled from him and dove into the spring at Delphi, at the base of Mt. Parnassos, which was then named after her. Water from this spring was sacred; it was used to clean the Delphian temples and inspire the priestesses.

Cassandra was a daughter of Hecuba and Priam. Apollo wished to court her. Cassandra promised to return his love on one condition – he should give her the power to see the future. Apollo fulfilled her wish, but she went back on her word and rejected him soon after. Angered that she broke her promise, Apollo cursed her that even though she would see the future, no one would ever believe her prophecies.

The Sibyl of Cumae, like Cassandra, promised Apollo her love in exchange for a boon. asking for as many years of life as the grains of sand in her hand. Apollo granted her wish, but she broke her word. While she lived longer, Apollo did not grant her agelessness, causing her to wither until only her voice remained.

Hestia, the goddess of the hearth, rejected both Apollo's and Poseidon's marriage proposals and swore that she would always stay unmarried.

In one version of the prophet Tiresias's origins, he was originally a woman who promised Apollo to sleep with him if he would give her music lessons. Apollo gave her her wish, but then she went back on her word and refused him. Apollo in anger turned her into a man.

=== Female counterparts ===
==== Artemis ====
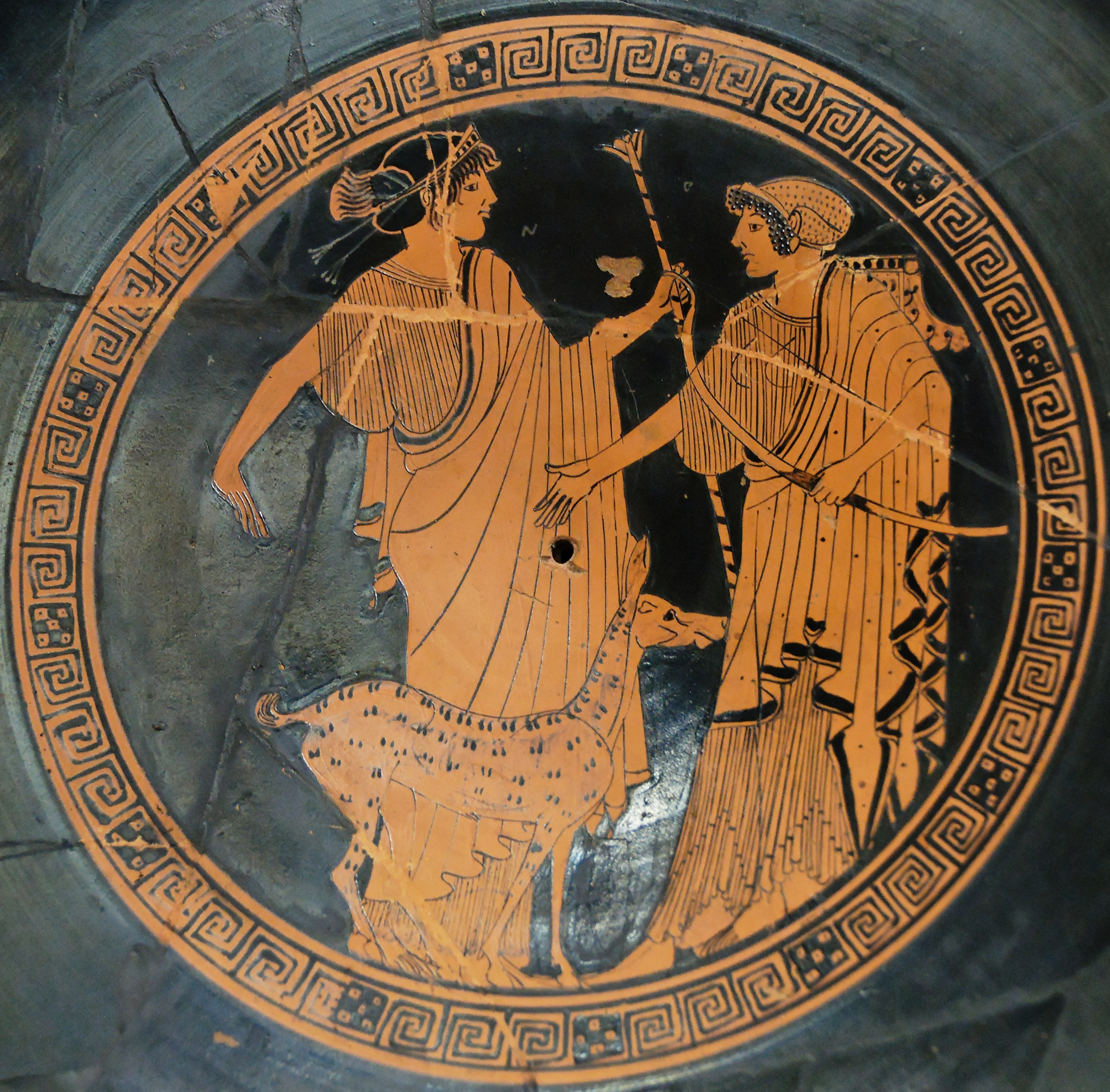
Apollo (left) and Artemis, by Brygos (potter signed). Tondo of an Attic red-figure cup c. 480–470 BC, Louvre.

Artemis as the sister of Apollo is thea apollousa, that is, she as a female divinity represented the same idea that Apollo did as a male divinity. However, this relationship was never sexual but spiritual, which is why they both are seen being unmarried in the Hellenistic period.

Artemis, like her brother, is armed with a bow and arrows. She is the cause of sudden deaths of women. She also is the protector of the young, especially girls. Though she has nothing to do with oracles, music or poetry, she sometimes led the female chorus on Olympus while Apollo sang. The laurel (daphne in Greek) was sacred to both. Artemis Daphnaia had her temple among the Lacedemonians, at a place called Hypsoi. Apollo Daphnephoros had a temple in Eretria, a "place where the citizens are to take the oaths". In later times when Apollo was regarded as identical with the sun or Helios, Artemis was naturally regarded as Selene or the moon.

==== Hecate ====
Hecate, the goddess of witchcraft and magic, is the chthonic counterpart of Apollo. One of Apollo's epithets, Hecatos, is the masculine form of Hecate, and both names mean "working from afar". If Hecate is the "gate-keeper", Apollo Agyieus is the "door-keeper". Hecate is the goddess of crossroads and Apollo is the god and protector of streets.

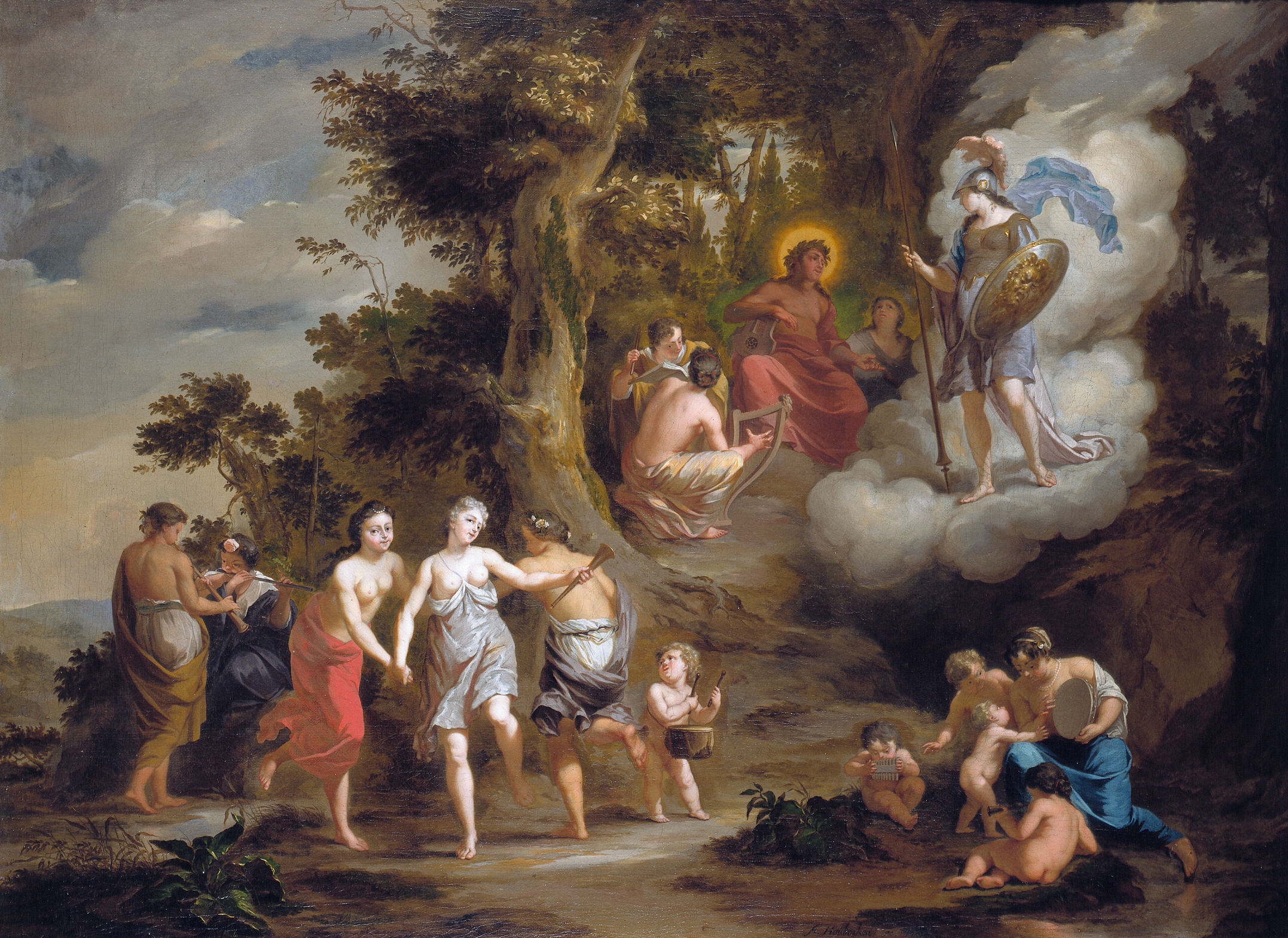
Pallas Athena visiting Apollo on Parnassus, by Arnold Houbraken

The oldest evidence found for Hecate's worship is at Apollo's temple in Miletos. There, Hecate was taken to be Apollo's sister counterpart in the absence of Artemis.

==== Athena ====
As a deity of knowledge and great power, Apollo was seen as the male counterpart of Athena. Because they were Zeus's favorite children, they were given more powers and duties. Apollo and Athena often took up the role of protectors of cities, and were patrons of some of the important cities. Athena was the principal goddess of Athens; Apollo was the principal god of Sparta. In the Trojan War, as Zeus's executive, Apollo is seen holding the aegis like Athena usually does.

=== Roman Apollo ===
The Roman worship of Apollo was adopted from the Greeks, and had no direct Roman equivalent, although later Roman poets often referred to him as Phoebus. There was a tradition that the Delphic oracle was consulted as early as the period of the kings of Rome during the reign of Tarquinius Superbus.

On the occasion of a pestilence in the 430s BC, Apollo's first temple at Rome was established in the Flaminian fields, replacing an older cult site there known as the "Apollinare". In 212 BC, during the Second Punic War, the Ludi Apollinares ("Apollonian Games") were instituted in his honor, on the instructions of a prophecy attributed to one Marcius. In the time of Augustus, who considered himself under the special protection of Apollo and was even said to be his son, his worship developed and he became one of the chief gods of Rome.

After the Battle of Actium (31 BC), which was fought near a sanctuary of Apollo, Augustus enlarged Apollo's temple, dedicated a portion of the spoils to him, and instituted quinquennial games in his honour. He also erected a new temple to the god on the Palatine hill. Sacrifices and prayers on the Palatine to Apollo and Diana formed the culmination of the Secular Games, held in 17 BC to celebrate the dawn of a new era.

== Festivals ==
The chief Apollonian festival was the Pythian Games held every four years at Delphi and was one of the four great Panhellenic Games. Also of major importance was the Delia held every four years on Delos. Athenian annual festivals included the Boedromia, Metageitnia, Pyanepsia, and Thargelia. Spartan annual festivals were the Carneia and the Hyacinthia. Thebes every nine years held the Daphnephoria.

== Attributes and symbols ==
Apollo's most common attributes were the bow and arrow. Other attributes of his included the kithara (an advanced version of the common lyre), the plectrum and the sword. Another common emblem was the sacrificial tripod, representing his prophetic powers. The Pythian Games were held in Apollo's honor every four years at Delphi, one of the four Panhellenic festivals. The bay laurel plant was used in expiatory sacrifices and in making the crown of victory at these games.

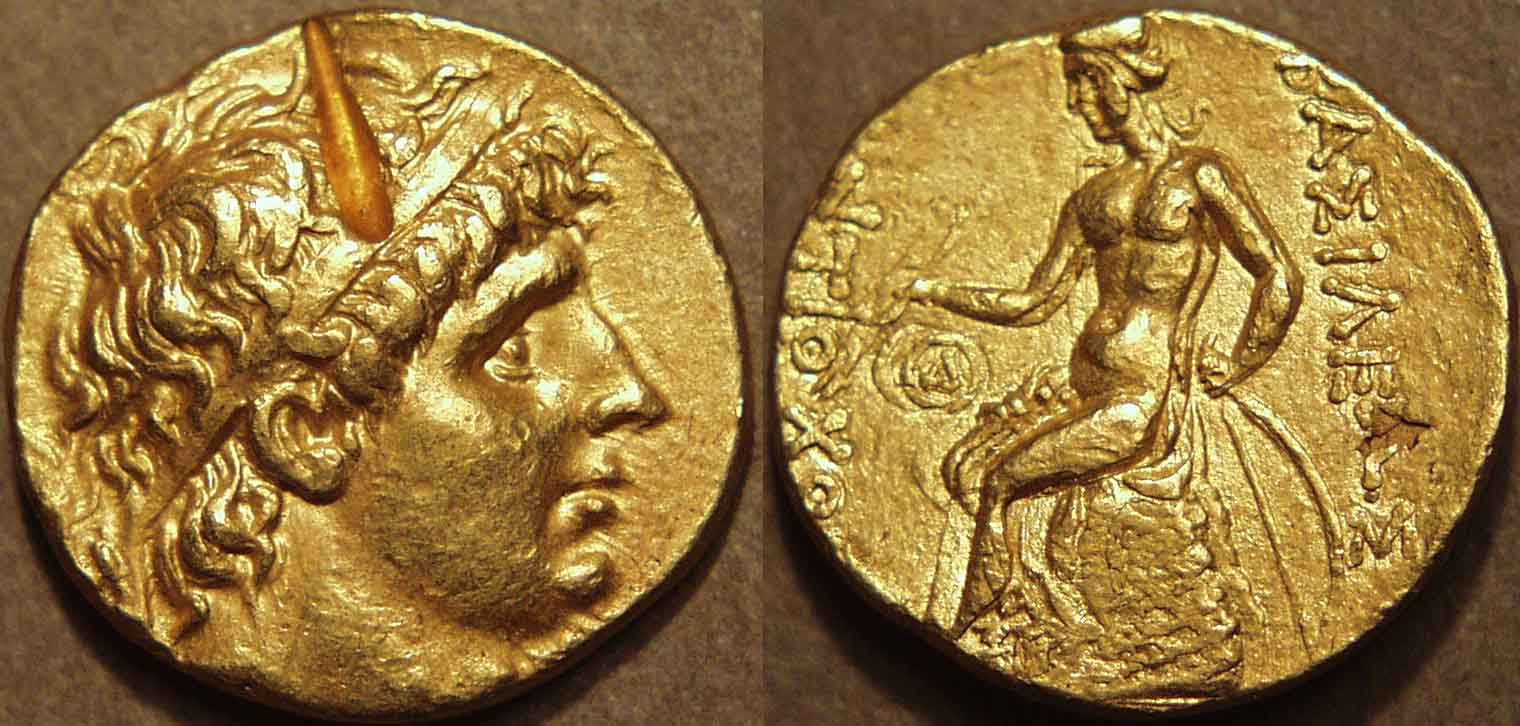
Gold stater of the Seleucid king Antiochus I Soter (reigned 281–261 BC), showing on the reverse a nude Apollo holding his key attributes: two arrows and a bow

The palm tree was also sacred to Apollo because he had been born under one in Delos. Animals sacred to Apollo included wolves, dolphins, roe deer, swans, cicadas (symbolizing music and song), ravens, hawks, crows (Apollo had hawks and crows as his messengers), snakes (referencing Apollo's function as the god of prophecy), mice and griffins, mythical eagle–lion hybrids of Eastern origin.

Homer and Porphyry wrote that Apollo had a hawk as his messenger. In many myths Apollo is transformed into a hawk. In addition, Claudius Aelianus wrote that in Ancient Egypt people believed that hawks were sacred to the god and that according to the ministers of Apollo in Egypt there were certain men called "hawk-keepers" (ἱερακοβοσκοί) who fed and tended the hawks belonging to the god. Eusebius wrote that the second appearance of the moon is held sacred in the city of Apollo in Egypt and that the city's symbol is a man with a hawklike face (Horus). Claudius Aelianus wrote that Egyptians called Apollo Horus in their own language.

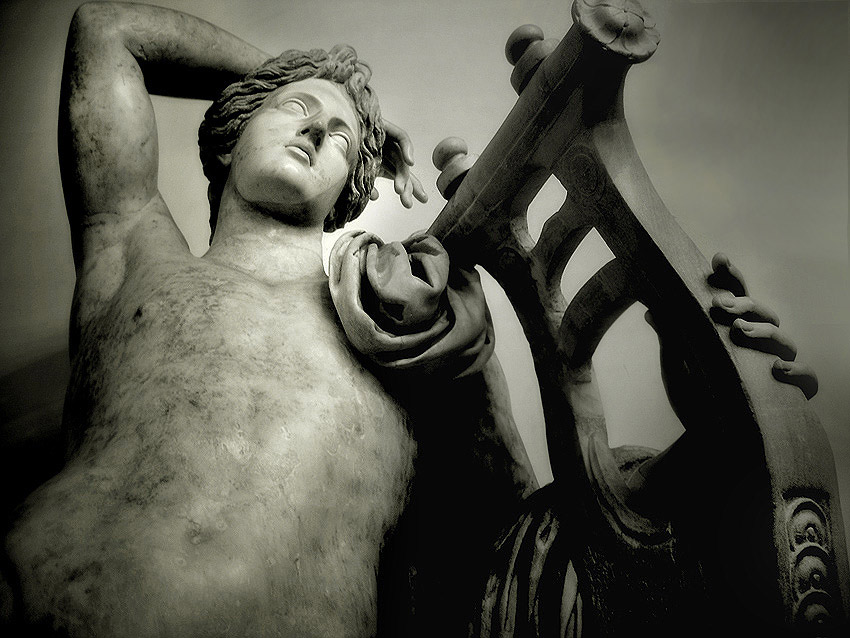
Apollo Citharoedus ("Apollo with a kithara"), Musei Capitolini, Rome

As god of colonization, Apollo gave oracular guidance on colonies, especially during the height of colonization, c. 750 to 550 BC, in the Archaic Period. According to Greek tradition, he helped Cretan or Arcadian colonists found the city of Troy. However, this story may reflect a cultural influence which had the reverse direction: Hittite cuneiform texts mention an Asia Minor god called Appaliunas or Apalunas in connection with the city of Wilusa attested in Hittite inscriptions, which is now generally regarded as being identical with the Greek Ilion by most scholars. In this interpretation, Apollo's title of Lykegenes can simply be read as "born in Lycia", which effectively severs the god's supposed link with wolves (possibly a folk etymology).

In literary contexts, Apollo represents harmony, order, and reason—characteristics contrasted with those of Dionysus, god of wine, who represents ecstasy and disorder. The contrast between the roles of these gods is reflected in the adjectives Apollonian and Dionysian. However, the Greeks thought of the two qualities as complementary: the two gods are brothers, and when Apollo at winter left for Hyperborea, he would leave the Delphic oracle to Dionysus. This contrast appears to be shown on the two sides of the Borghese Vase.

Apollo is often associated with the Golden Mean, the Greek ideal of moderation and a virtue that opposes gluttony.

In antiquity, Apollo was associated with the planet Mercury. The ancient Greeks believed that the Mercury as observed during the morning was different from the one during the evening, because each twilight Mercury would appear farther from the Sun as it set than it had the night before. The morning planet was called Apollo, and the one at evening Hermes/Mercury before they realised they were the same, thereupon the name 'Mercury/Hermes' was kept, and 'Apollo' was dropped.

== Apollo in the arts ==
Apollo is a common theme in Greek and Roman art and also in the art of the Renaissance. The earliest Greek word for a statue is "delight" (ἄγαλμα, agalma), and the sculptors tried to create forms which would inspire such guiding vision. Maurice Bowra notices that the Greek artist puts into a god the highest degree of power and beauty that can be imagined. The sculptors derived this from observations on human beings, but they also embodied in concrete form, issues beyond the reach of ordinary thought.

The naked bodies of the statues are associated with the cult of the body which was essentially a religious activity. The muscular frames and limbs combined with slim waists indicate the Greek desire for health, and the physical capacity which was necessary in the hard Greek environment. The statues of Apollo and the other gods present them in their full youth and strength. "In the balance and relation of their limbs, such figures express their whole character, mental and physical, and reveal their central being, the radiant reality of youth in its heyday".

=== Archaic sculpture ===
Numerous statues of male youths from Archaic Greece exist, and were once thought to be representations of Apollo, though later discoveries indicated that many represented mortals. In 1895, V. I. Leonardos proposed the term kouros ("male youth") to refer to those from Keratea; this usage was later expanded by Henri Lechat in 1904 to cover all statues of this format.

The earliest examples of life-sized statues of Apollo may be two figures from the Ionic sanctuary on the island of Delos. Such statues were found across the Greek-speaking world, the preponderance of these were found at the sanctuaries of Apollo with more than one hundred from the sanctuary of Apollo Ptoios, Boeotia alone. Significantly more rare are the life-sized bronze statues. One of the few originals which survived into the present day—so rare that its discovery in 1959 was described as "a miracle" by Ernst Homann-Wedeking—is the masterpiece bronze, Piraeus Apollo. It was found in Piraeus, a port city close to Athens, and is believed to have come from north-eastern Peloponnesus. It is the only surviving large-scale Peloponnesian statue.

=== Classical sculpture ===
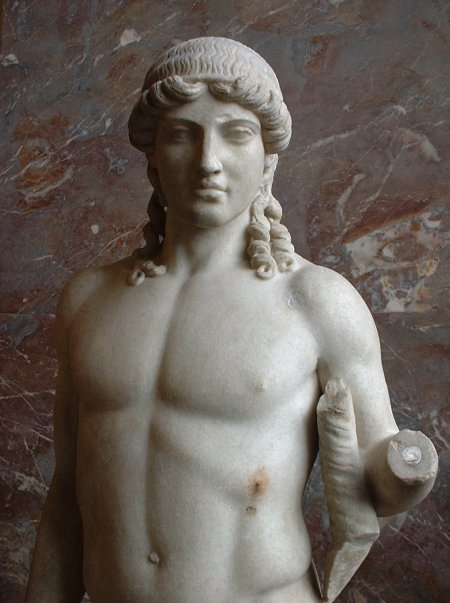
Apollo of Mantua, marble Roman copy after a 5th-century-BCE Greek original attributed to Polykleitos, Musée du Louvre

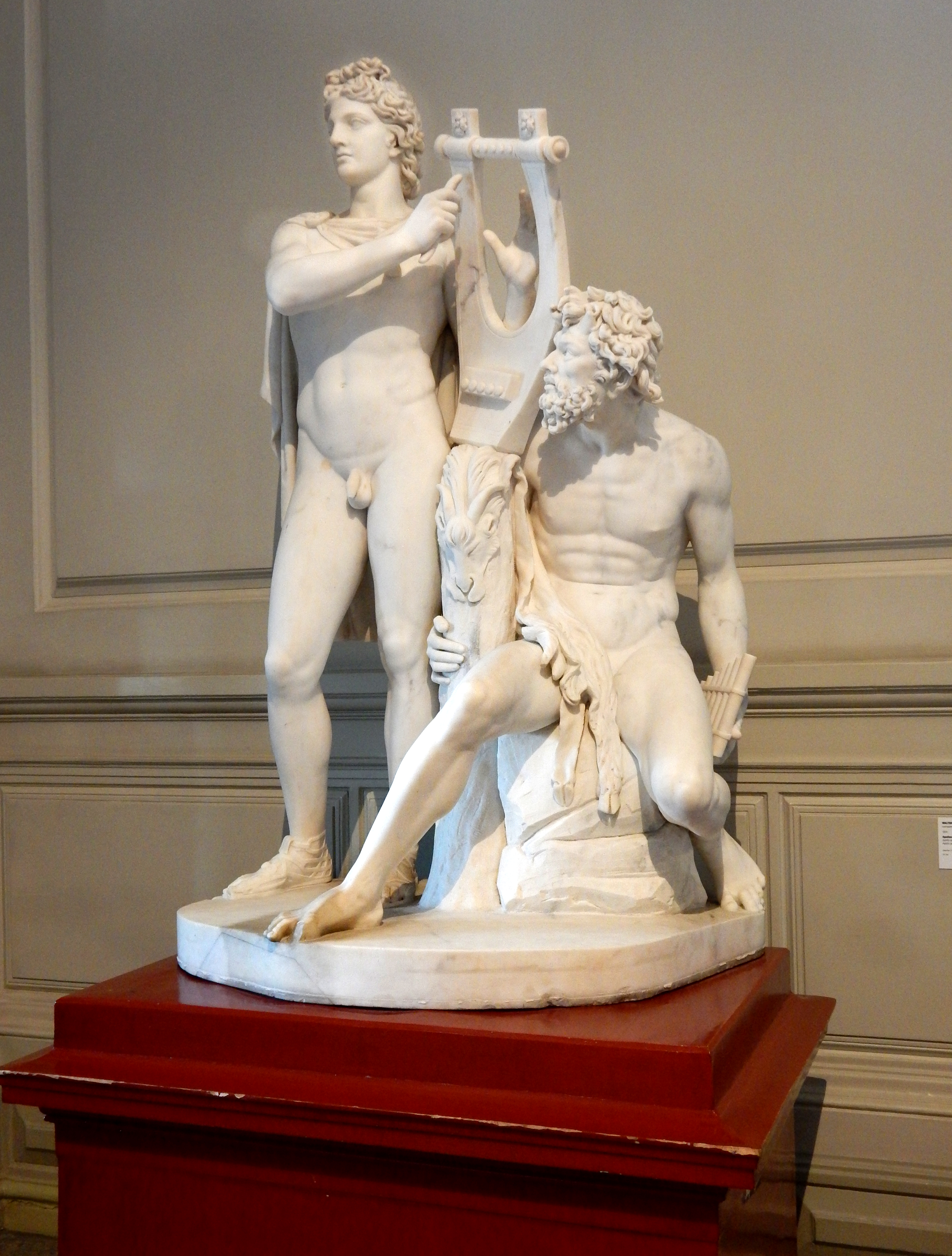
Marble sculpture of Apollo and Marsyas by Walter Runeberg, at the arrivals hall of Ateneum in Helsinki, Finland

The famous Apollo of Mantua and its variants are early forms of the Apollo Citharoedus statue type, in which the god holds the cithara, a sophisticated seven-stringed variant of the lyre, in his left arm. While none of the Greek originals have survived, several Roman copies from approximately the late 1st or early 2nd century exist, of which an example is the Apollo Barberini.

=== Hellenistic Greece-Rome ===
Apollo as a handsome beardless young man is often depicted with a cithara (as Apollo Citharoedus) or bow in his hand, or reclining on a tree (the Apollo Lykeios and Apollo Sauroctonos types). The Apollo Belvedere is a marble sculpture that was rediscovered in the late 15th century; for centuries it epitomized the ideals of Classical Antiquity for Europeans, from the Renaissance through the 19th century. The marble is a Hellenistic or Roman copy of a bronze original by the Greek sculptor Leochares, made between 330 and 320 BC.

Another haloed Apollo in mosaic, from Hadrumentum, is in the museum at Sousse. The conventions of this representation, head tilted, lips slightly parted, large-eyed, curling hair cut in locks grazing the neck, were developed in the 3rd century BC to depict Alexander the Great. Some time after this mosaic was executed, the earliest depictions of Christ would also be beardless and haloed.

== Modern reception ==
Apollo often appears in modern and popular culture due to his status as the god of music, dance and poetry.

=== Postclassical art and literature ===
==== Dance and music ====
Apollo has featured in dance and music in modern culture. Percy Bysshe Shelley composed a "Hymn of Apollo" (1820), and the god's instruction of the Muses formed the subject of Igor Stravinsky's Apollon musagète (1927–1928). In 1978, the Canadian band Rush released an album with songs "Apollo: Bringer of Wisdom"/"Dionysus: Bringer of Love".

==== Books ====
Apollo has been portrayed in modern literature, such as when Charles Handy in Gods of Management (1978) uses Greek gods as a metaphor to portray various types of organizational culture. Apollo represents a "role" culture where order, reason, and bureaucracy prevail.

=== Psychology and philosophy ===
In the philosophical discussion of the arts, a distinction is sometimes made between the Apollonian and Dionysian impulses, where the former is concerned with imposing intellectual order and the latter with chaotic creativity. Friedrich Nietzsche argued that a fusion of the two was most desirable. Psychologist Carl Jung's Apollo archetype represents what he saw as the disposition in people to over-intellectualise and maintain emotional distance.

=== Spaceflight ===
In spaceflight, the 1960s and 1970s NASA program for orbiting and landing astronauts on the Moon was named after Apollo, by NASA manager Abe Silverstein:

Apollo riding his chariot across the Sun was appropriate to the grand scale of the proposed program.

— Abe Silverstein, Release 69-36

== Genealogy ==
Apollo's family tree

Gaia
Uranus
Uranus's genitals	Coeus	Phoebe	Cronus	Rhea
Leto	Zeus	Hera	Poseidon	Hades	Demeter	Hestia
APOLLO	Artemis	a
b
Ares	Hephaestus
Metis
Athena
Maia
Hermes
Semele
Dionysus
Dione
a	b
Aphrodite

== See also ==
- Darrhon – Paeonian god of healing
- Dryad – Tree nymph in Greek mythology
- Epirus – Historical region in the Balkans
- Family tree of the Greek gods – Mythological family tree
- List of solar deities
- Phoebus (disambiguation)
- Sibylline Oracles – Collection of oracular utterances
- Solar deity – Sky deity who represents the Sun
- Tegyra – Site of an oracle of Apollo
- Temple of Apollo (disambiguation)

== Sources ==
=== Primary sources ===
- Aelian, On Animals, Volume II: Books 6–11. Translated by A. F. Scholfield. Loeb Classical Library 447. Cambridge, MA: Harvard University Press, 1958.
- Aeschylus, The Eumenides in Aeschylus, with an English translation by Herbert Weir Smyth, Ph.D. in two volumes, Vol 2, Cambridge, Massachusetts, Harvard University Press, 1926, Online version at the Perseus Digital Library.
- Antoninus Liberalis, The Metamorphoses of Antoninus Liberalis translated by Francis Celoria (Routledge 1992). Online version at the Topos Text Project.
- Apollodorus, Apollodorus, The Library, with an English Translation by Sir James George Frazer, F.B.A., F.R.S. in 2 Volumes. Cambridge, MA, Harvard University Press; London, William Heinemann Ltd. 1921. Online version at the Perseus Digital Library.
- Apollonius of Rhodes, Apollonius Rhodius: the Argonautica, translated by Robert Cooper Seaton, W. Heinemann, 1912. Internet Archive.
- Callimachus, Callimachus and Lycophron with an English Translation by A. W. Mair; Aratus, with an English Translation by G. R. Mair, London: W. Heinemann, New York: G. P. Putnam 1921. Online version at Harvard University Press. Internet Archive.
- Campbell, David A., Greek Lyric, Volume III: Stesichorus, Ibycus, Simonides, and Others, Loeb Classical Library No. 476, Cambridge, Massachusetts, Harvard University Press, 1991. ISBN 978-0674995253. Online version at Harvard University Press.
- Cicero, Marcus Tullius, De Natura Deorum in Cicero in Twenty-eight Volumes, XIX De Natura Deorum; Academica, with an English translation by H. Rackham, Cambridge, Massachusetts: Harvard University Press; London: William Heinemann, Ltd, 1967. Internet Archive.
- Diodorus Siculus, Library of History, Volume III: Books 4.59-8, translated by C. H. Oldfather, Loeb Classical Library No. 340. Cambridge, Massachusetts, Harvard University Press, 1939. Online version at Harvard University Press. Online version by Bill Thayer.
- Etymologicum Magnum, edited by Thomas Gaisford, Oxford, E. Typographeo Academico, 1848. Online version at the Munich Digitization Center.
- Herodotus, Herodotus, with an English translation by A. D. Godley. Cambridge. Harvard University Press. 1920. Online version available at The Perseus Digital Library.
- Hesiod, Catalogue of Women, in Hesiod: The Shield, Catalogue of Women, Other Fragments, edited and translated by Glenn W. Most, Loeb Classical Library No. 503, Cambridge, Massachusetts, Harvard University Press, 2007, 2018. ISBN 978-0-674-99721-9. Online version at Harvard University Press.
- Hesiod, Theogony, in The Homeric Hymns and Homerica with an English Translation by Hugh G. Evelyn-White, Cambridge, MA., Harvard University Press; London, William Heinemann Ltd. 1914. Online version at the Perseus Digital Library.
- Homeric Hymn 3 to Apollo in The Homeric Hymns and Homerica with an English Translation by Hugh G. Evelyn-White, Cambridge, MA., Harvard University Press; London, William Heinemann Ltd. 1914. Online version at the Perseus Digital Library.
- Homeric Hymn 4 to Hermes, in The Homeric Hymns and Homerica with an English Translation by Hugh G. Evelyn-White, Cambridge, Massachusetts, Harvard University Press; London, William Heinemann Ltd. 1914. Online version at the Perseus Digital Library.
- Homer (1924). The Iliad with an English Translation by A.T. Murray, PhD in two volumes. Cambridge, MA.: Harvard University Press.
- Homer; The Odyssey with an English Translation by A.T. Murray, Ph.D. in two volumes. Cambridge, MA., Harvard University Press; London, William Heinemann, Ltd. 1919. Online version at the Perseus Digital Library.
- Hyginus, De astronomia, in The Myths of Hyginus, edited and translated by Mary A. Grant, Lawrence: University of Kansas Press, 1960. Online version at ToposText.
- Hyginus, Fabulae, in The Myths of Hyginus, edited and translated by Mary A. Grant, Lawrence: University of Kansas Press, 1960. Online version at ToposText.
- Livy, The History of Rome, Books I and II With An English Translation. Cambridge. Cambridge, Mass., Harvard University Press; London, William Heinemann, Ltd. 1919.
- Nonnus, Dionysiaca; translated by Rouse, W H D, I Books I-XV. Loeb Classical Library No. 344, Cambridge, Massachusetts, Harvard University Press; London, William Heinemann Ltd. 1940. Internet Archive
- Nonnus, Dionysiaca; translated by Rouse, W H D, II Books XVI-XXXV. Loeb Classical Library No. 345, Cambridge, Massachusetts, Harvard University Press; London, William Heinemann Ltd. 1940. Internet Archive
- Page, Denys Lionel, Sir, Poetae Melici Graeci, Oxford University Press, 1962.
- Statius, Thebaid. Translated by Mozley, J H. Loeb Classical Library Volumes. Cambridge, Massachusetts, Harvard University Press; London, William Heinemann Ltd. 1928.
- Strabo (1924). H.L. Jones (ed.). The Geography of Strabo. Cambridge, Mass.: Harvard University Press.
- Sophocles, Oedipus Rex
- Palaephatus, On Unbelievable Tales 46. Hyacinthus (330 BCE)
- Ovid, Metamorphoses, Brookes More, Boston, Cornhill Publishing Co. 1922. Online version at the Perseus Digital Library. 10. 162–219 (1–8 CE)
- Pausanias, Pausanias Description of Greece with an English Translation by W.H.S. Jones, Litt.D., and H.A. Ormerod, M.A., in 4 Volumes. Cambridge, MA, Harvard University Press; London, William Heinemann Ltd. 1918. Online version at the Perseus Digital Library.
- Philostratus the Elder, Imagines, in Philostratus the Elder, Imagines. Philostratus the Younger, Imagines. Callistratus, Descriptions. Translated by Arthur Fairbanks. Loeb Classical Library No. 256. Cambridge, Massachusetts: Harvard University Press, 1931. Online version at Harvard University Press. Internet Archive 1926 edition. i.24 Hyacinthus (170–245 CE)
- Philostratus the Younger, Imagines, in Philostratus the Elder, Imagines. Philostratus the Younger, Imagines. Callistratus, Descriptions. Translated by Arthur Fairbanks. Loeb Classical Library No. 256. Cambridge, Massachusetts: Harvard University Press, 1931. Online version at Harvard University Press. Internet Archive 1926 edition. 14. Hyacinthus (170–245 CE)
- Pindar, Odes, Diane Arnson Svarlien. 1990. Online version at the Perseus Digital Library.
- Pliny, Natural History, Volume I: Books 1-2, translated by H. Rackham, Loeb Classical Library No. 330, Cambridge, Massachusetts, Harvard University Press, 1938. Online version at Harvard University Press.
- Plutarch. Lives, Volume I: Theseus and Romulus. Lycurgus and Numa. Solon and Publicola. Translated by Bernadotte Perrin. Loeb Classical Library No. 46. Cambridge, Massachusetts: Harvard University Press, 1914. Online version at Harvard University Press. Numa at the Perseus Digital Library.
- Pseudo-Plutarch, De fluviis, in Plutarch's morals, Volume V, edited and translated by William Watson Goodwin, Boston: Little, Brown & Co., 1874. Online version at the Perseus Digital Library.
- Lucian, Dialogues of the Dead. Dialogues of the Sea-Gods. Dialogues of the Gods. Dialogues of the Courtesans, translated by M. D. MacLeod, Loeb Classical Library No. 431, Cambridge, Massachusetts, Harvard University Press, 1961. Online version at Harvard University Press. Internet Archive.
- First Vatican Mythographer, 197. Thamyris et Musae
- Servius, Servii grammatici qui feruntur in Vergilii carmina commentarii, Volume I, edited by Georgius Thilo and Hermannus Hagen, Bibliotheca Teubneriana, Leipzig, Teubner, 1881. Internet Archive. Online version at the Perseus Digital Library.
- Stephanus of Byzantium, Stephani Byzantii Ethnicorum quae supersunt, edited by August Meineke, Berlin, Impensis G. Reimeri, 1849. Internet Archive. Google Books. Online version at ToposText.
- Tzetzes, John, Chiliades, editor Gottlieb Kiessling, F.C.G. Vogel, 1826. Google Books. (English translation: Book I by Ana Untila; Books II–IV, by Gary Berkowitz; Books V–VI by Konstantino Ramiotis; Books VII–VIII by Vasiliki Dogani; Books IX–X by Jonathan Alexander; Books XII–XIII by Nikolaos Giallousis. Internet Archive).
- Valerius Flaccus, Argonautica, translated by J. H. Mozley, Loeb Classical Library No. 286. Cambridge, Massachusetts, Harvard University Press; London, William Heinemann Ltd. 1928. Online version at Harvard University Press. Online translated text available at theoi.com.
- Vergil, Aeneid. Theodore C. Williams. trans. Boston. Houghton Mifflin Co. 1910. Online version at the Perseus Digital Library.

=== Secondary sources ===
- Athanassakis, Apostolos N., and Benjamin M. Wolkow, The Orphic Hymns, Johns Hopkins University Press; owlerirst Printing edition (29 May 2013). ISBN 978-1-4214-0882-8. Google Books.
- Bieber, Margarete (1964). Alexander the Great in Greek and Roman Art. Chicago: Argonaut, Inc.
- Hugh Bowden, 2005. Classical Athens and the Delphic Oracle: Divination and Democracy. Cambridge University Press.
- Walter Burkert, 1985. Greek Religion (Harvard University Press) III.2.5 passim
- This article incorporates text from a publication now in the public domain: Freese, John Henry (1911). "Apollo". In Chisholm, Hugh (ed.). Encyclopædia Britannica. Vol. 2 (11th ed.). Cambridge University Press. pp. 184–186.
- Fontenrose, Joseph Eddy, Python: A Study of Delphic Myth and Its Origins, University of California Press, 1959.
- Gantz, Timothy, Early Greek Myth: A Guide to Literary and Artistic Sources, Johns Hopkins University Press, 1996, Two volumes: ISBN 978-0-8018-5360-9 (Vol. 1), ISBN 978-0-8018-5362-3 (Vol. 2).
- Graf, Fritz (2009). Apollo. Taylor & Francis US. ISBN 978-0-415-31711-5.
- Miranda J. Green, 1997. Dictionary of Celtic Myth and Legend, Thames and Hudson.
- Grimal, Pierre, The Dictionary of Classical Mythology, Wiley-Blackwell, 1996. ISBN 978-0-631-20102-1.
- Hard, Robin, The Routledge Handbook of Greek Mythology: Based on H.J. Rose's "Handbook of Greek Mythology", Psychology Press, 2004, ISBN 9780415186360. Google Books.
- Karl Kerenyi, 1953. Apollon: Studien über Antiken Religion und Humanität revised edition.
- Kerényi, Karl 1951, The Gods of the Greeks, Thames and Hudson, London.
- Lexicon Iconographicum Mythologiae Classicae (LIMC). II.1: Aphrodisias – Athena, Zurich and Munich, Artemis Verlag, 1984. ISBN 3760887511. Internet Archive.
- Mertens, Dieter; Schutzenberger, Margareta. Città e monumenti dei Greci d'Occidente: dalla colonizzazione alla crisi di fine V secolo a.C.. Roma L'Erma di Bretschneider, 2006. ISBN 88-8265-367-6.
- Martin Nilsson, 1955. Die Geschichte der Griechische Religion, vol. I. C.H. Beck.
- Parada, Carlos, Genealogical Guide to Greek Mythology, Jonsered, Paul Åströms Förlag, 1993. ISBN 978-91-7081-062-6.
- Pauly–Wissowa, Realencyclopädie der klassischen Altertumswissenschaft: II, "Apollon". The best repertory of cult sites (Burkert).
- Peck, Harry Thurston, Harpers Dictionary of Classical Antiquities, New York. Harper and Brothers. 1898. Online version at the Perseus Digital Library.
- Pfeiff, K.A., 1943. Apollon: Wandlung seines Bildes in der griechischen Kunst. Traces the changing iconography of Apollo.
- D.S.Robertson (1945) A handbook of Greek and Roman Architecture Cambridge University Press
- Smith, William, Dictionary of Greek and Roman Biography and Mythology, London (1873). Online version at the Perseus Digital Library.
- This article incorporates text from a publication now in the public domain: Smith, William, ed. (1870). "Artemis". Dictionary of Greek and Roman Antiquities. London: John Murray.
- Smith, William, A Dictionary of Greek and Roman Antiquities. William Smith, LLD. William Wayte. G. E. Marindin. Albemarle Street, London. John Murray. 1890. Online version at the Perseus Digital Library.
- Spivey Nigel (1997) Greek art Phaedon Press Ltd.
- Tripp, Edward, Crowell's Handbook of Classical Mythology, Thomas Y. Crowell Co; First edition (June 1970). ISBN 0-690-22608-X. Internet Archive.
- West, M. L. (2003), Greek Epic Fragments: From the Seventh to the Fifth Centuries BC, Loeb Classical Library No. 497, Cambridge, Massachusetts, Harvard University Press, 2003. ISBN 978-0-674-99605-2. Online version at Harvard University Press. Internet Archive.
