= Mese (mythology) =

Muse of Greek mythology, venerated at Delphi

In Greek mythology, Mese (/ˈmiːsiː/; Ancient Greek: Μέση) was one of the three Muses of the lyre together with her sisters Nete and Hypate. They were worshipped at Delphi, where the Temple of Apollo and the Oracle were located. Mese was the Muse of the middle cord of the seven noted lyre and represented one of the three strings of the said popular Greek musical instrument.

These three muses were comparable to the original three, Aoide, Melete, and Mneme. Alternatively, they were Cephisso, Apollonis, and Borysthenis, which portrayed them as the daughters of Apollo.

In his Quaestiones Convivales, Plutarch acknowledged the role of Urania as the muse of the heavens, but also gave Mese and her sisters an astronomical role. According to the text, the universe was harmonically divided into three parts: the fixed stars, the planets, and then everything under the moon. Mese took care of the second one.
