= Hypate =

Muse in Greek mythology

In Greek mythology, Hypate /ˈhɪpətiː/ (Ὑπάτη) was one of the three Muses of the lyre who were worshipped at Delphi, where the Temple of Apollo and the Oracle were located. Her name was also used to describe the first (lowest) note of the first tetrachord in ancient Greek music, which was also the tallest string on the lyre. Her sisters who were worshipped along with her were Nete and Mese, who also have notes named after them in ancient Greek music theory. These three muses were comparable to the original three, Aoide, Melete, and Mneme. Alternatively, they were Cephisso, Apollonis, and Borysthenis, which portrayed them as the daughters of Apollo.

In his Quaestiones Convivales, Plutarch acknowledged the role of Urania as the muse of the heavens, but also gave Hypate and her sisters an astronomical role. According to the text, the universe was harmonically divided into three parts: the fixed stars, the planets, and then everything under the moon. Hypate took care of the former.

== Place name ==
The name of the ancient city Hypate (now Ypati, a village in Phthiotis west of Lamia) is unrelated to this Muse. It has a different etymology meaning "the height of Oeta (Oiti)".
