= Arche (moon) =

Moon of Jupiter

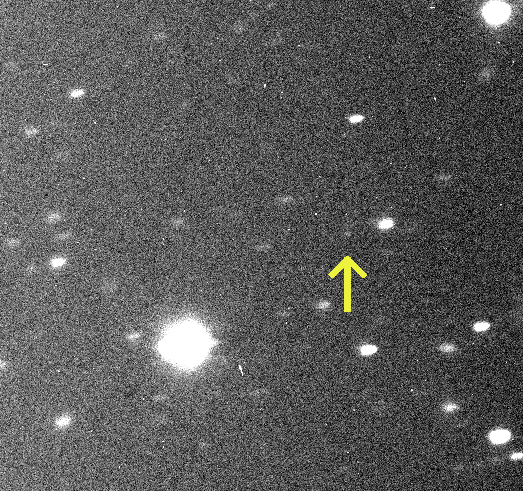
- Discovery image of Arche by the University of Hawaiʻi telescope in October 2002

Discovery
- Discovered by: Scott S. Sheppard
- Discovery site: Mauna Kea Obs.
- Discovery date: 31 October 2002

Designations
- Designation: Jupiter XLIII
- Pronunciation: /ˈɑːrkiː/
- Named after: Αρχή Archē
- Alternative names: S/2002 J 1
- Adjectives: Archean /ɑːrˈkiːən/

Orbital characteristics
- Observation arc: 16 years 2018-05-12 (last obs)
- Semi-major axis: 22931000 km
- Eccentricity: 0.259
- Orbital period (sidereal): −723.9 days
- Mean anomaly: 126.7°
- Inclination: 165.0°
- Longitude of ascending node: 350.7°
- Argument of perihelion: 161.1°
- Satellite of: Jupiter
- Group: Carme group

Physical characteristics
- Mean diameter: 3 km
- Apparent magnitude: 22.8
- Absolute magnitude (H): 16.2 (40 obs)

Arche /ˈɑːrkiː/, also known as Jupiter XLIII, is a natural satellite of Jupiter. It was discovered by a team of astronomers from the University of Hawaiʻi led by Scott S. Sheppard on 31 October 2002, and received the temporary designation S/2002 J 1.

Arche is about 3 kilometres in diameter, and orbits Jupiter at an average distance of 23,717,000 km in 746.185 days, at an inclination of 165° to the ecliptic (162° to Jupiter's equator), in a retrograde direction and with an eccentricity of 0.149.

It was named in 2005 after Arche, whom some Greek writers described as one of the four original Muses, an addition to the earlier three (Aoede, Melete, and Mneme).

Arche belongs to the Carme group, made up of irregular retrograde moons orbiting Jupiter at a distance ranging between 23 and 24 million km and at an inclination of about 165°.
