= Nete (mythology) =

Greek muse of the lyre worshipped at Delph

In Greek mythology, Nete /ˈniːtiː/ (Ancient Greek: Νήτη) was one of the three Muses of the lyre that were worshipped at Delphi, where the Temple of Apollo and the Oracle were located. Her name was also the lowest of the seven notes of the lyre. Her sisters that were worshipped along with her were Hypate and Mese. These three muses were comparable to the original three, Aoide, Melete, and Mneme. Alternatively, they were Cephisso, Apollonis, and Borysthenis, which portrayed them as the daughters of Apollo.

In his Quaestiones Convivales, Plutarch acknowledged the role of Urania as the muse of the heavens, but also gave Nete and her sisters an astronomical role. According to the text, the universe was harmonically divided into three parts: the fixed stars, the planets, and then everything under the moon. Nete took care of the latter.
