= Pierian Spring =

Aquatic feature in Greek mythology

In Greek mythology, the Pierian Spring of Macedonia was sacred to the Pierides and the Muses. As the metaphorical source of knowledge of art and science, it was popularized by a couplet in Alexander Pope's 1711 poem An Essay on Criticism: "A little learning is a dang'rous thing; / Drink deep, or taste not the Pierian spring."

The Pierian Spring is sometimes confused with the Castalian Spring, as it was by Lord Chesterfield who misquotes Alexander Pope in Letters to His Son.

== Classical sources ==
The sacred spring was said to be near ancient Leivithra in Pieria, a region of ancient Macedonia, also the location of Mount Olympus, and believed to be the home and the seat of worship of Orpheus. The Muses "were said to have frolicked about the Pierian springs soon after their birth". The spring is believed to be a fountain of knowledge that inspires whoever drinks from it.

The name of the spring comes from the Pierides, the gaggle of girls (daughters of King Pierus) who sought a contest with the Muses. When they lost, they were turned into magpies. Ovid tells this tale after explaining the origin of the Heliconian spring in his 8 AD narrative poem Metamorphoses V. The metamorphosis into magpies comes at the end of the book:

The greatest of our number ended thus her learned songs; and with concordant voice the chosen Nymphs adjudged the Deities, on Helicon who dwell, should be proclaimed the victors. But the vanquished nine began to scatter their abuse; to whom rejoined the goddess; 'Since it seems a trifling thing that you should suffer a deserved defeat, and you must add unmerited abuse to heighten your offence, and since by this appears the end of our endurance, we shall certainly proceed to punish you according to the limit of our wrath.' But these Emathian sisters laughed to scorn our threatening words; and as they tried to speak, and made great clamour, and with shameless hands made threatening gestures, suddenly stiff quills sprouted from out their finger-nails, and plumes spread over their stretched arms; and they could see the mouth of each companion growing out into a rigid beak. – And thus new birds were added to the forest. – While they made complaint, these Magpies that defile our groves, moving their stretched-out arms, began to float, suspended in the air. And since that time their ancient eloquence, their screaming notes, their tiresome zeal of speech have all remained.

An early reference to the Pierian Spring is found in the Satyricon of Petronius, from the 1st century AD, at the end of section 5

His animum succinge bonis: sic flumine largo
plenus Pierio defundes pectore verba.

Translation:

Come! Gird up thy soul! Inspiration will then force a vent
And rush in a flood from a heart that is loved by the muse!

— Translated (by W.C. Firebaugh)

Sappho, too, refers to the roses of the Pierian Spring, in her poem "To One Who Loved Not Poetry," in the mid-600 B.C.

κατθάνοισα δὲ κείσῃ οὐδέ ποτα
μναμοσύνα σέθεν
ἔσσετ' οὐδὲ †ποκ'†ὔστερον· οὐ
γὰρ πεδέχῃς βρόδων
τῶν ἐκ Πιερίας· ἀλλ' ἀφάνης
κἠν Ἀίδα δόμῳ
φοιτάσεις πεδ' ἀμαύρων νεκύων
ἐκπεποταμένα

Translation:

But thou shalt ever lie dead,
nor shall there be any remembrance of thee then or thereafter,
for thou hast not of the roses of Pieria;
but thou shalt wander obscure even in the house of Hades,
flitting among the shadowy dead.

== Alexander Pope ==
Lines 215 to 232 of Pope's poem read:

"A little learning is a dang'rous thing;
Drink deep, or taste not the Pierian spring:
There shallow draughts intoxicate the brain,
And drinking largely sobers us again.
Fir'd at first sight with what the Muse imparts,
In fearless youth we tempt the heights of Arts,
While from the bounded level of our mind
Short views we take, nor see the lengths behind;
But more advanc'd, behold with strange surprise
New distant scenes of endless science rise!
So pleas'd at first the towering Alps we try,
Mount o'er the vales, and seem to tread the sky,
Th' eternal snows appear already past,
And the first clouds and mountains seem the last;
But, those attain'd, we tremble to survey
The growing labours of the lengthen'd way,
Th' increasing prospects tire our wand'ring eyes,
Hills peep o'er hills, and Alps on Alps arise!"

== Later references ==
The opening stanza appears in Ray Bradbury's 1953 novel Fahrenheit 451, as Fire Captain Beatty chastizes Guy Montag, the protagonist, about reading books, which are forbidden in the society of the novel.

In his poem "Hugh Selwyn Mauberley", Ezra Pound refers to Pierian "roses" in a critique of the cheap aesthetic of his time, which in his opinion has replaced a true appreciation of art and knowledge:

Conduct, on the other hand, the soul
"Which the highest cultures have nourished"
To Fleet St. where
Dr. Johnson flourished;

Beside this thoroughfare
The sale of half-hose has
Long since superseded the cultivation
Of Pierian roses.

Sir William Jones (1746–1794) also made reference to "the fam'd Pierian rill" (a brook or rivulet) in his 1763 poem about the origin of chess, "Caissa".

Henry Miller mentions the Pierian Spring in Moloch: or, This Gentile World, written in 1927–28 and published posthumously in 1992.

In Dorothy Parker's poem, "The Little Old Lady in Lavender Silk", the narrator reminisces about the scandal that was her "neglect of the waters Pierian" in favor of "the habit of love".

In the 1986 David Cronenberg film The Fly, the protagonist Seth Brundle succumbs to madness and disease as the result of a science experiment. He rants at the short-sightedness of his lover, proclaiming "drink deep, or taste not the plasma spring!"

In the 2018 video game Call of Duty: Black Ops 4, Nikolai says "A little learning is a dangerous thing, drink deep or taste not the Pieran Spring, so goes the poem. I understand its meaning". He is referring to the journey ahead, leading to the finale of the Aether Zombies storyline.
