= Nete =

Nete may refer to:

- Nete (river), in northern Belgium
  - Grote Nete
  - Kleine Nete
- Nete language, spoken in Papua New Guinea
- Nete virus, a lineage of segmented RNA viruses
- Nete (mythology), one of the three muses of the lyre that were worshipped at Delphi. Her sisters were Mese and Hypate
- Norethisterone enanthate (NETE), a type of birth control
