= An Essay on Criticism =

English poem by Alexander Pope

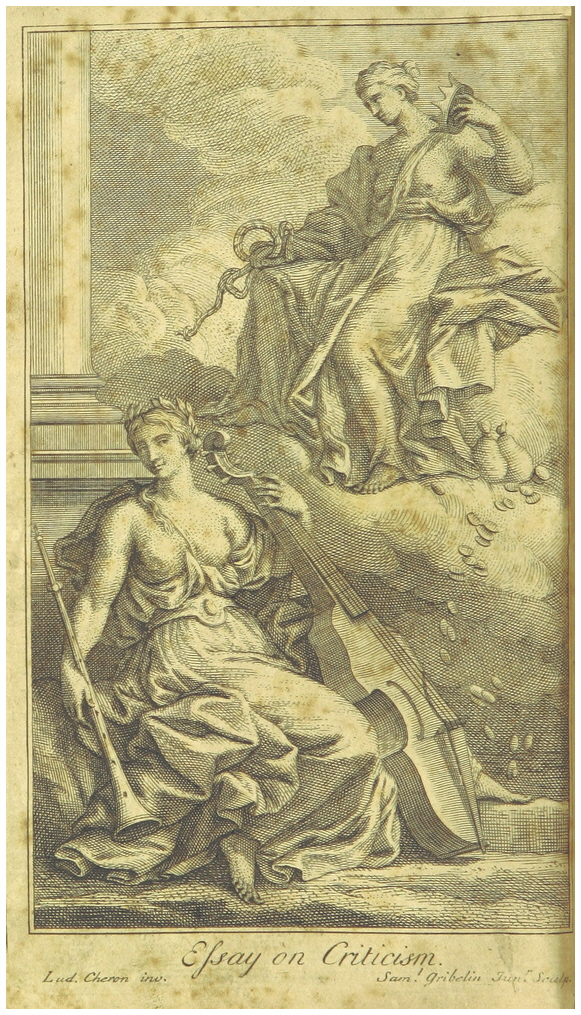
Frontispiece

An Essay on Criticism is one of the first major poems written by the English writer Alexander Pope (1688–1744), published in 1711. It is the source of the famous quotations "To err is human; to forgive, divine", "A little learning is a dang'rous thing" (frequently paraphrased as "A little knowledge is a dangerous thing"), and "Fools rush in where angels fear to tread".

== Composition ==
The first fragmentary drafts of the work were written in Abberley in 1707. It was first published in May 1711. Many of the poem's ideas had existed in prose form since at least 1706. Composed in heroic couplets (pairs of adjacent rhyming lines of iambic pentameter) and written in the Horatian mode of satire, it is a verse essay primarily concerned with how writers and critics behave in the new literary commerce of Pope's contemporary age. The poem covers a range of good criticism and advice, and represents many of the chief literary ideals of Pope's age.

== Structure and themes ==
The verse "essay" was not an uncommon form in eighteenth-century poetry, deriving ultimately from classical forebears including Horace's Ars Poetica and Lucretius' De rerum natura.

Pope contends in the poem's opening couplets that bad criticism does greater harm than bad writing:

'Tis hard to say, if greater Want of Skill
Appear in Writing or in Judging ill;
But, of the two, less dang'rous is th' Offence,
To tire our Patience, than mis-lead our Sense:
Some few in that, but Numbers err in this,
Ten Censure wrong for one who Writes amiss;
A Fool might once himself alone expose,
Now One in Verse makes many more in Prose.

— lines 1–8

Pope delineates common faults of poets, e.g., settling for easy and clichéd rhymes:

And ten low Words oft creep in one dull Line,
While they ring round the same unvary'd Chimes,
With sure Returns of still expected Rhymes.
Where-e'er you find the cooling Western Breeze,
In the next Line, it whispers thro' the Trees;
If Crystal Streams with pleasing Murmurs creep,
The Reader's threaten'd (not in vain) with Sleep.

— lines 347–353

Throughout the poem, Pope refers to ancient writers such as Virgil, Homer, Aristotle, Horace and Longinus. This is a testament to his belief that the "Imitation of the ancients" is the ultimate standard for taste. Pope also says, "True Ease in Writing comes from Art, not Chance,/ As those move easiest who have learn'd to dance" (362–363), meaning poets are made, not born.

As is usual in Pope's poems, the Essay concludes with a reference to Pope himself. William Walsh, the last of the critics mentioned, was a mentor and friend of Pope who had died in 1708.

Part II of An Essay on Criticism includes a famous couplet:

A little Learning is a dangerous thing;
Drink deep, or taste not the Pierian Spring:

— lines 215–216

This is in reference to the spring in the Pierian Mountains in Macedonia, sacred to the Muses. The first line of this couplet is often misquoted as "a little knowledge is a dangerous thing".

The Essay also gives this famous line (towards the end of Part II):

To Err is Human; to Forgive, Divine.

— line 525

The phrase "fools rush in where angels fear to tread" from Part III (line 625) has become part of the popular lexicon, and has been used for and in various works.

== Critical reception ==
An Essay on Criticism mocks John Dennis, who famously and fiercely attacked it. Consequently, Dennis also appears in Pope's later satire, The Dunciad.

Thomas Rymer and Jonathan Swift were among other critics: Rymer, who had the strongest critique said, "till of late years England was as free from critics as it is from wolves...they who are least acquainted with the game are aptest to bark at everything that comes in their way."; Swift's statement concentrated on critics who were damned "as barbarous as a judge who should take up a resolution to hang all men that came before him upon trial."
