= Emathus =

Son of Makedon in Greek mythology

See also Emathion

In Greek mythology, Emathus, Emathius or Amathus (Ancient Greek:Ἥμαθος, Ἠμάθιος, Ἄμαθος), was son of Makednos, from whom Emathia (the Homeric name of Lower Macedonia) was believed to have derived its name. The daughters of his brother Pierus, the Pierides, are sometimes called Emathides after him. The Emathian or Emathius in Latin is a frequently used epithet in Latin poets for Alexander the Great.

Emathus was apparently first called son of Makednos in Marsyas of Pella (c. 330 BC), who made Emathos and Pieros the eponymous founders of these two regions in Ancient Macedonia. According to Solinus (9.10), Emathius was unrelated to and earlier than Makednos. He also says that while the country was still called Emathia, Orestes and Hermione arrived and had a son Orestis there, who founded an empire (also called Orestis) stretching to the Adriatic; this was some time before Makednos.

According to Stephanus of Byzantium, Brusos was a son of Emathius, from whom Brusis, a portion of Macedonia, was believed to have derived its name. Galadrus, another son of Emathius, is likewise credited with giving his name to the city of Galadrai.
