= Melete =

Muse of thought and meditation in ancient Greek mythology

In Greek mythology, Melete /ˈmɛlɪtiː/ (Ancient Greek: Μελέτη) was one of the three original Boeotian muses before the Nine Olympian Muses were founded. Her sisters were Aoede and Mneme. She was the muse of thought and meditation. Melete literally means "ponder" and "contemplation" in Greek.

According to Pausanias in the later 2nd century AD, there were three original Muses: Aoidē ("song" or "voice"), Meletē ("practice"), and Mnēmē ("memory"). Together, these three form the complete picture of the preconditions of poetic art in cult practice. In Delphi three Muses were worshipped as well, but with other names: Nētē, Mesē, and Hypatē, which are the names of the three chords of the ancient musical instrument, the lyre. Alternatively they were called Cēphisso, Apollonis, and Borysthenis, whose names characterise them as daughters of Apollo. In later tradition, four Muses were recognized: Thelxinoē, Aoedē, Archē, and Meletē, said to be daughters of Zeus and Plusia (or of Uranus).
