= Mneme Lake =

Antarctic lake

- Location within South Shetland Islands
- Location: Livingston Island, Antarctica
- Coordinates: 62°35′40.7″S 60°54′30″W
- Lake type: Glacial lake
- Max. length: 220 metres (720 ft)
- Max. width: 85 metres (279 ft)
- Surface area: 1.3 hectares (3.2 acres)

Map of Antarctic Specially Protected Area ASPA 126 Byers Peninsula

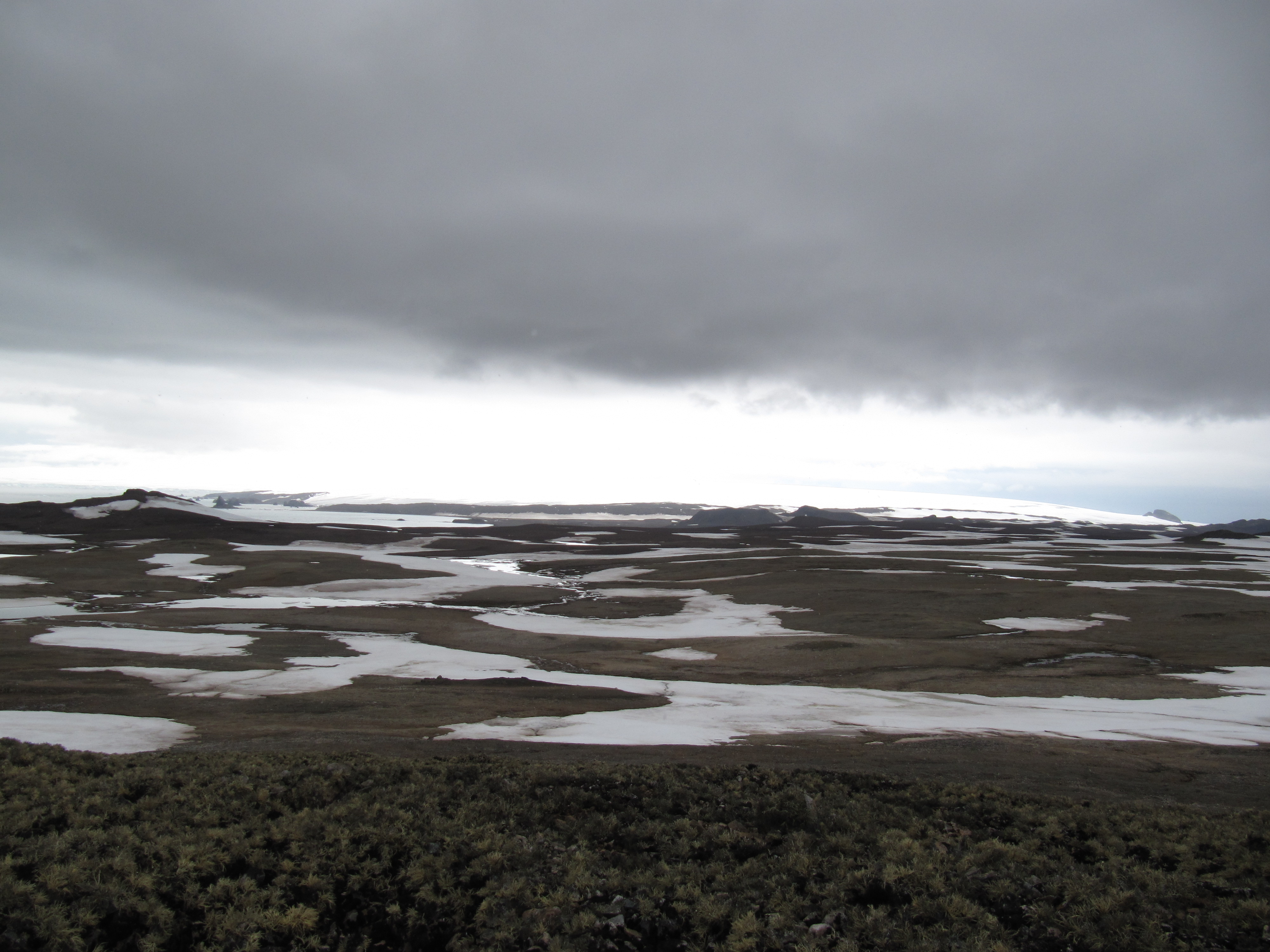
Eastern Byers Peninsula in Livingston Island with Robbery Beaches and Tsamblak Hill in the middle, and left to right Rowe Point, Ivanov Beach, Urvich Wall and Clark Nunatak in the background

Map of Livingston, Greenwich, Robert, Snow and Smith Islands

Mneme Lake (Bulgarian: езеро Мнема, romanized: ezero Mnema, IPA: [ˈɛzɛro ˈmnɛmɐ]) is the oval-shaped 220 m long in southwest–northeast direction and 85 m wide lake on the northwest coast of Livingston Island in the South Shetland Islands, Antarctica. It has a surface area of 1.3 ha and is separated from the waters of Barclay Bay by a 12 to 40 m wide strip of land. The lake and its vicinity lie in a restricted zone of scientific importance to Antarctic microbiology, part of the Antarctic Specially Protected Area Byers Peninsula.

The feature is named after Mneme, the nymph of memory in Greek mythology.

== Location ==
Mneme Lake is situated on Ivanov Beach just west of Rowe Point and centred at 62°35′40.7″S 60°54′30″W, which is 2.5 km northeast of Bilyar Point. Bulgarian mapping of the area in 2009 and 2017.

== Maps ==
- L. Ivanov. Antarctica: Livingston Island and Greenwich, Robert, Snow and Smith Islands. Scale 1:120000 topographic map. Troyan: Manfred Wörner Foundation, 2009. ISBN 978-954-92032-6-4
- L. Ivanov. Antarctica: Livingston Island and Smith Island. Scale 1:100000 topographic map. Manfred Wörner Foundation, 2017. ISBN 978-619-90008-3-0
- Antarctic Digital Database (ADD). Scale 1:250000 topographic map of Antarctica. Scientific Committee on Antarctic Research (SCAR). Since 1993, regularly upgraded and updated

== See also ==
- Antarctic lakes
- Livingston Island
