= Achelois =

Name attributed to several Greek mythological characters

Achelois (Ancient Greek: Ἀχελωίς, romanized: Achelōís, lit. 'she who drives away pain') was a name attributed to several figures in Greek mythology.

- Achelois, surname of the Sirens, the daughters of Achelous.
- Achelois, a general name for water-nymphs, as in Columella, where the companions of the Pegasids are called Acheloides.
- Achelois, a daughter of Pierus and one of the Pierides.
