= Valley of the Muses =

Ancient Greek sanctuary

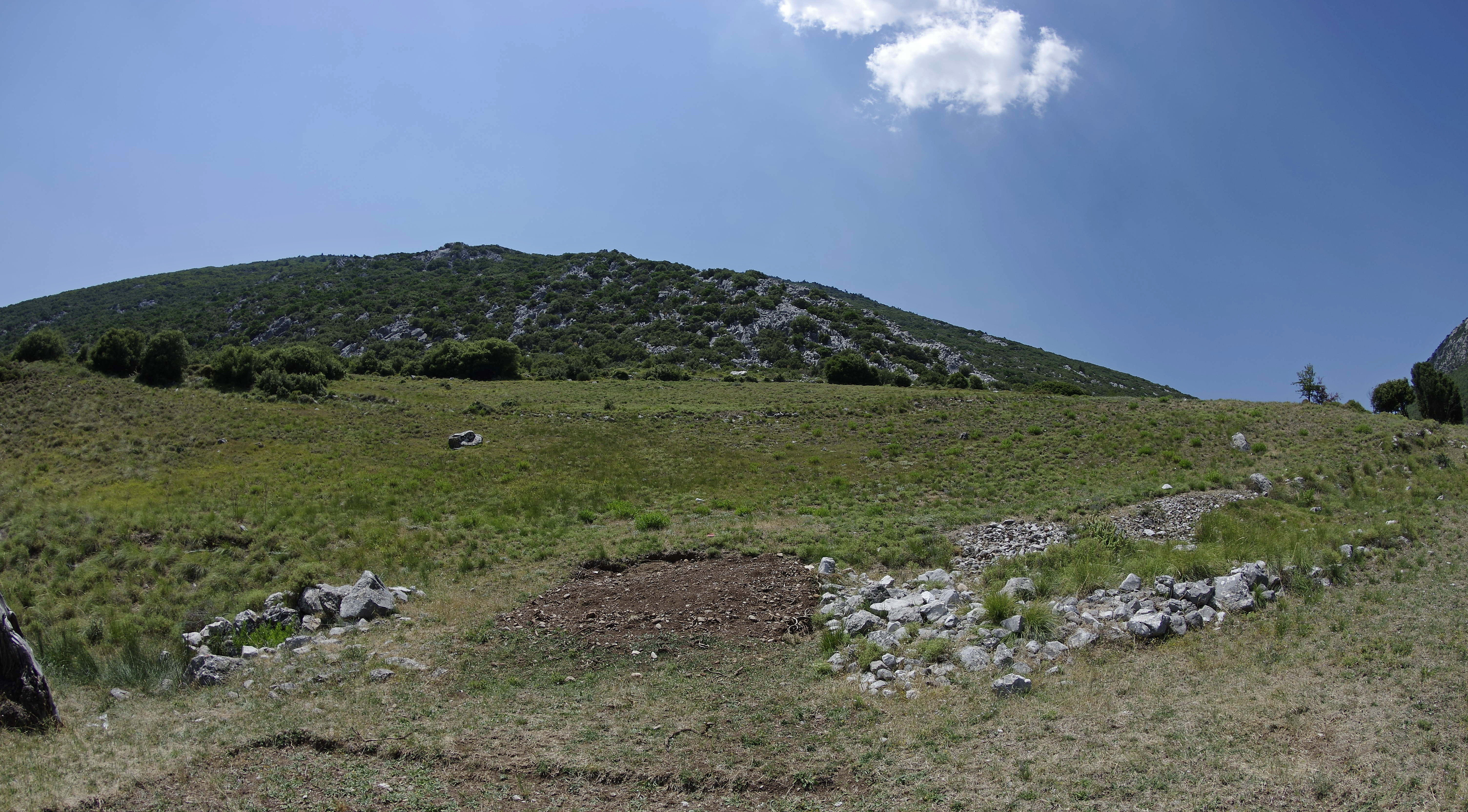
Valley of Muses (looking southwest; remains of skene in foreground in front of cavea)

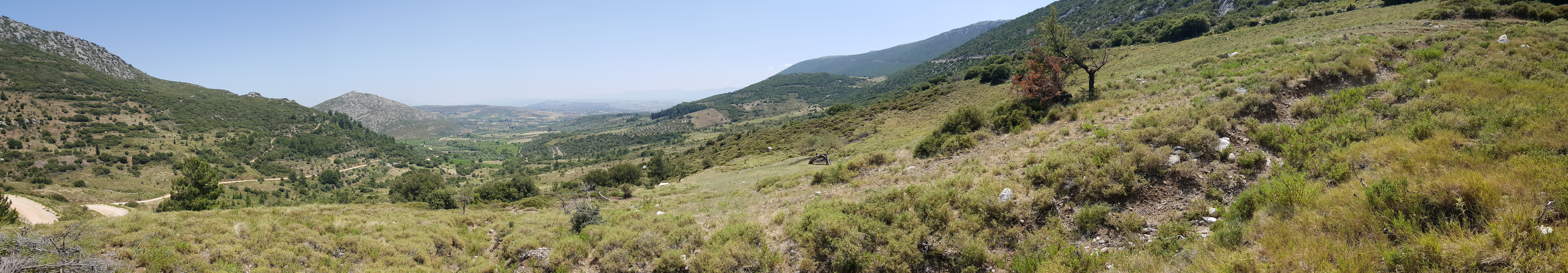
Valley of Muses (from top, cavea in foreground looking northeast)

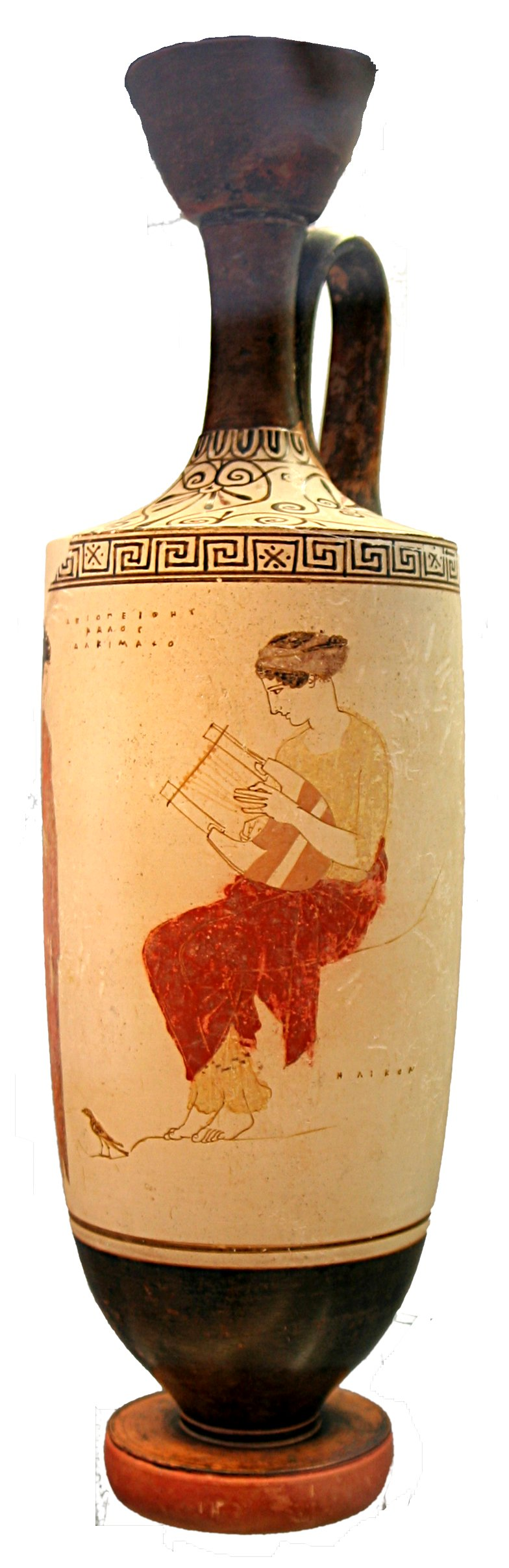
Lyre-playing Muse seated on a rock labeled ΗΛΙΚΟΝ, Helicon (Attic white-ground lekythos, 440–430 BC )

The Valley of the Muses was the site of an ancient Greek sanctuary to the Muses and the Mouseia festivals held in their honor. It is an open-air historical site open permanently to the public. It is located at Thespies on the eastern slopes of Mount Helicon in Boeotia, Greece. (Located at 38°19'13.0"N 23°03'15.0"E)

== History ==
The recorded history of the valley began in the 6th century BC. Its greatest period started in the 3rd century BC with the establishment of the Mouseia festivals (Grk Μουσεῖα), organised every fourth year (originally every year) by the Thespians. Poets and musicians from all over Greece participated in various games. In the 2nd and 1st centuries BC, games in honor of the Roman emperor were added. From that time the emperors sponsored the festivals, which were then called "Great Kaisareia" (Grk Μεγάλα Καισάρεια) because the emperor was honored over the Muses. Winners of the games dedicated their tripods to a sanctuary. Many statues, paintings, and reliefs depicting the Muses, famous poets, and musicians stood in the open-air space of the Valley. With the rise of monotheism, the festivals and the valley were abandoned.

== Archaeology ==
In 1882, Panagiotis Stamatakis made the first test trench in the little church of Ayia Triada and noted the rectangular foundation of a small temple of the Muses. He also indicated the remains of the theatre on the mountain slope. The French Archaeological School under Jamot excavated systematically in 1888, 1889 and 1890, and discovered all the antiquities (G. Roux, Le Val des Muses et les Musees chez les auteurs anciens, in Bulletin de Correspondance Hellenique, 1954, 1, pp. 22–48).

== The sanctuary ==
The Sanctuary consisted of:

- The theater, dated to the end of the 3rd century BC or the beginning of the 2nd century BC; built for the musical and theatrical games held in the valley during the Mouseia festival. Spectators sat on seats cut in the mountain slope. Only the first row, the prohedria, was marble.
- The temple or altar of the Muses, dated in the 3rd century BC; a small rectangular building. After its abandonment the church of Ayia Triada was built upon the ancient foundations, which were revealed after the demolition of the church.
- A long Ionic stoa (length 96,70 m.) on the west of the temple, dated in the 3rd century BC; this housed the votive offerings to the Muses. Originally it had an internal wall and rooms; these were replaced later by a colonnade in the Corinthian order.
- Statues of the nine Muses; works of the poet and sculptor Onestos. These originally stood in a single group; their bases were discovered during the excavations. On the five most well-preserved bases were found inscribed names of Muses and epigrams.
- The square tower of Askra, dated to the 4th century BC; the tower crowned the hill Pyrgaki and dominated the valley from the north. It had three storerooms on the ground floor. An earlier circuit wall, now ruined, enclosed the tower. It was probably built by the Thespians a little before 371 BC, the time of the battle of Leuktra, to control the movements of the Thebans.
