= Pimpleia =

Ancient Greek city

- Πίμπλεια (Ancient Greek)
- Orpheus's life
- Interactive map of Pimpleia
- 40°08′36″N 22°29′35″E

Pimpleia (Ancient Greek: Πίμπλεια) was a city in Pieria in Ancient Greece, located near Dion and ancient Leivithra at Mount Olympus. Pimpleia is described as a "κώμη" ("quarter, suburb") of Dion by Strabo. The location of Pimpleia is possibly to be identified with the modern village of Agia Paraskevi near Litochoron.

It was renowned as the birthplace and early abode of Orpheus. Many springs and memorials dedicated to Orpheus and Orphic cults. Cults of the Muses were also celebrated, under the epithet Pimpleids (Πιμπληίδες).
