= Ardalus =

Ancient Greek mythological figure

Ardalus (Ancient Greek: Ἄρδαλος) was, in Greek mythology, a son of the god Hephaestus who was said to have invented the flute, and to have built a sanctuary of the Muses at Troezen, who derived from him the surname Ardalides or Ardaliotides.

This story is recorded in the works of Pausanias, and in some obscure fragments of Hesychius of Alexandria.

== Pausanias ==
- Pausanias, Description of Greece with an English Translation by W.H.S. Jones, Litt.D., and H.A. Ormerod, M.A., in 4 Volumes. Cambridge, MA, Harvard University Press; London, William Heinemann Ltd. 1918. ISBN 0-674-99328-4. Online version at the Perseus Digital Library
- Pausanias, Graeciae Descriptio. 3 vols. Leipzig, Teubner. 1903. Greek text available at the Perseus Digital Library.
