= Pierides (mythology) =

Group of sisters from Greek mythology

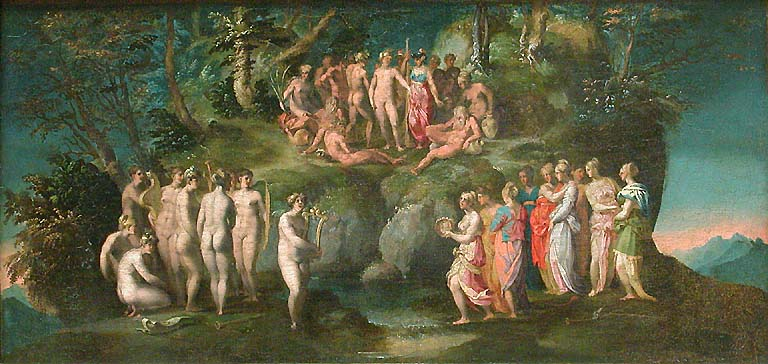
The Challenge of the Pierides by Rosso (c. 1520)

In Greek mythology, the Pierides (Ancient Greek: Πιερίδες) or Emathides (Ἠμαθίδες) were the nine sisters who defied the Muses in a contest of song and, having been defeated, were turned into birds. The Muses themselves are sometimes called by this name.

== Names and family ==
The Pierides were the daughters of Pierus, king of Emathia in Macedon, by Antiope of Pieria or Euippe of Paionia. The sisters were also called Emathides, named after their paternal uncle Emathus. In other sources, they are recounted to be seven in number and named them as Achelois, Neilo, Tritone, Asopo, Heptapora, Tipoplo, and Rhodia.

== Mythology ==
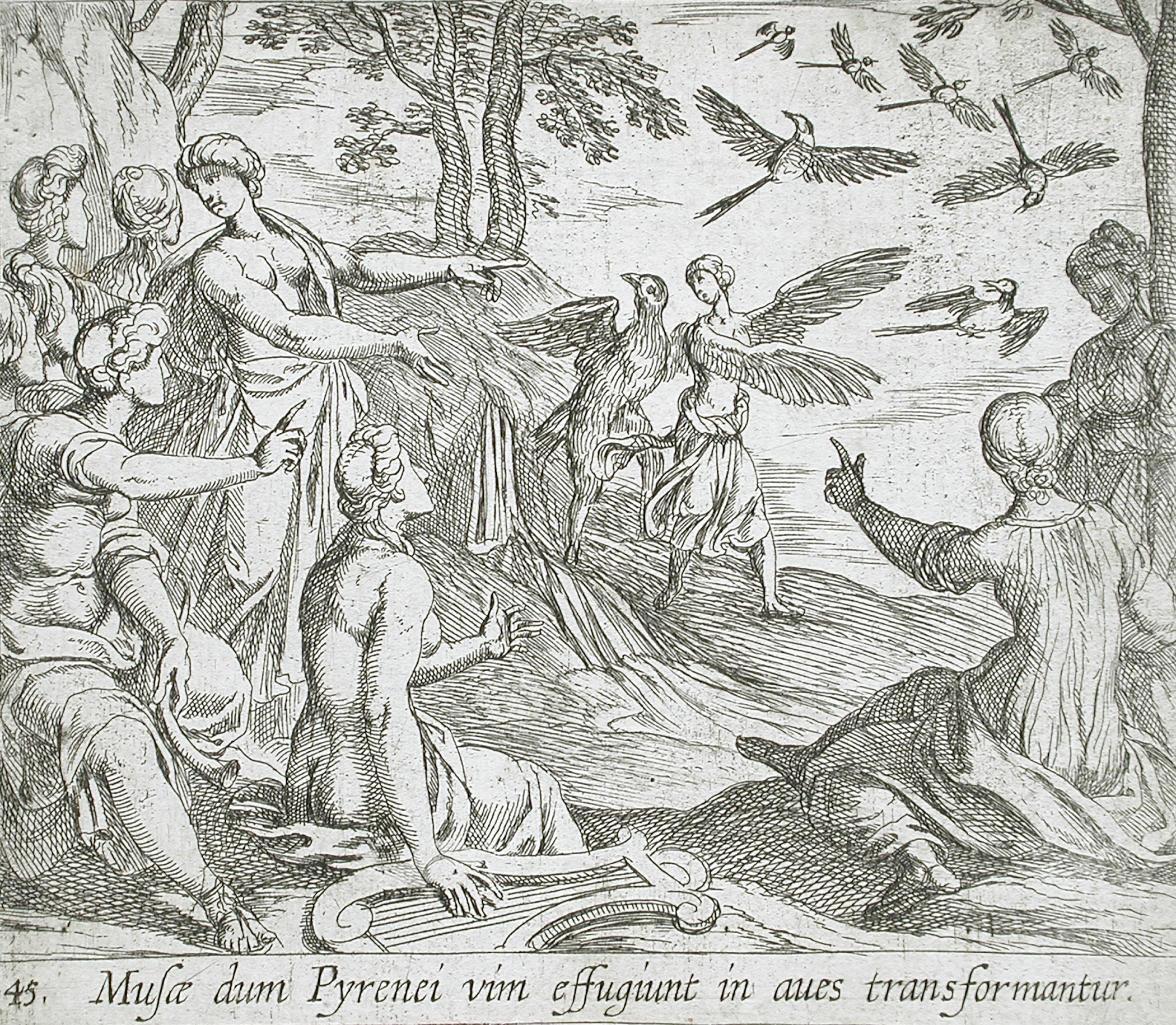
(Holland, Amsterdam), Antonio Tempesta (Italy, Florence, 1555–1630) Metamorphosis of the Pierides by Wilhelm Janson (1606) at Los Angeles County Museum of Art

=== Ovid's account ===
In Ovid's Metamorphoses, Urania, one of the Muses, recounts their contest with the Pierides to Athena in the following excerpts:

So spoke the Muse. And now was heard the sound of pennons in the air, and voices, too, gave salutations from the lofty trees. Minerva, thinking they were human tongues, looked up in question whence the perfect words; but on the boughs, nine ugly magpies perched, those mockers of all sounds, which now complained their hapless fate. And as she wondering stood, Urania, goddess of the Muse, rejoined; — 'Look, those but lately worsted in dispute augment the number of unnumbered birds. — Pierus was their father, very rich in lands of Pella; and their mother (called Evippe of Paeonia) when she brought them forth, nine times evoked, in labours nine, Lucina's aid. — Unduly puffed with pride, because it chanced their number equalled ours these stupid sisters, hither to engage in wordy contest, fared through many towns; — through all Haemonia and Achaia came to us, and said; — 'Oh, cease your empty songs, attuned to dulcet numbers, that deceive the vulgar, untaught throng. If aught is yours of confidence, O Thespian Deities contend with us: our number equals yours. We will not be defeated by your arts; nor shall your songs prevail. — Then, conquered, give Hyantean Aganippe; yield to us the Medusean Fount; — and should we fail, we grant Emathia's plains, to where uprise Paeonia's peaks of snow. — Let chosen Nymphs award the prize.'

The nymphs became the judges of the musical contest. One of the Pierides sang about the flight of the Olympian gods from the monster Typhoeus:

'Twas shameful to contend; it seemed more shameful to submit. At once, the chosen Nymphs swore justice by their streams, and sat for judgment on their thrones of rock. At once, although the lot had not been cast, the leading sister hastened to begin.—She chanted of celestial wars; she gave the Giants false renown; she gave the Gods small credit for great deeds.—She droned out, "Forth, those deepest realms of earth, Typhoeus came, and filled the Gods with fear. They turned their backs in flight to Egypt; and the wearied rout, where Great Nile spreads his seven-channeled mouth, were there received. – Thither the earth-begot Typhoeus hastened: but the Gods of Heaven deceptive shapes assumed.—Lo, Jupiter (Zeus as Libyan Ammon's crooked horns attest) was hidden in the leader of a flock; Apollo in a crow; Bacchus in a goat; Diana (Artemis) in a cat; Venus (Aphrodite) in a fish; Saturnian Juno (Hera) in a snow-white cow; Cyllenian Hermes in an Ibis' wings.

Urania and Athena continued their conversation about the great match:

"Such stuff she droned out from her noisy mouth: and then they summoned us; but, haply, time permits thee not, nor leisure thee permits, that thou shouldst hearken to our melodies." "Nay doubt it not", quoth Pallas (Athena), "but relate your melodies in order." And she sat beneath the pleasant shadows of the grove. And thus again Urania; "On our side we trusted all to one." Which having said, Calliope, mother of Orpheus of Leivithra, arose. Her glorious hair was bound with ivy. She attuned the chords, and chanted as she struck the sounding strings:

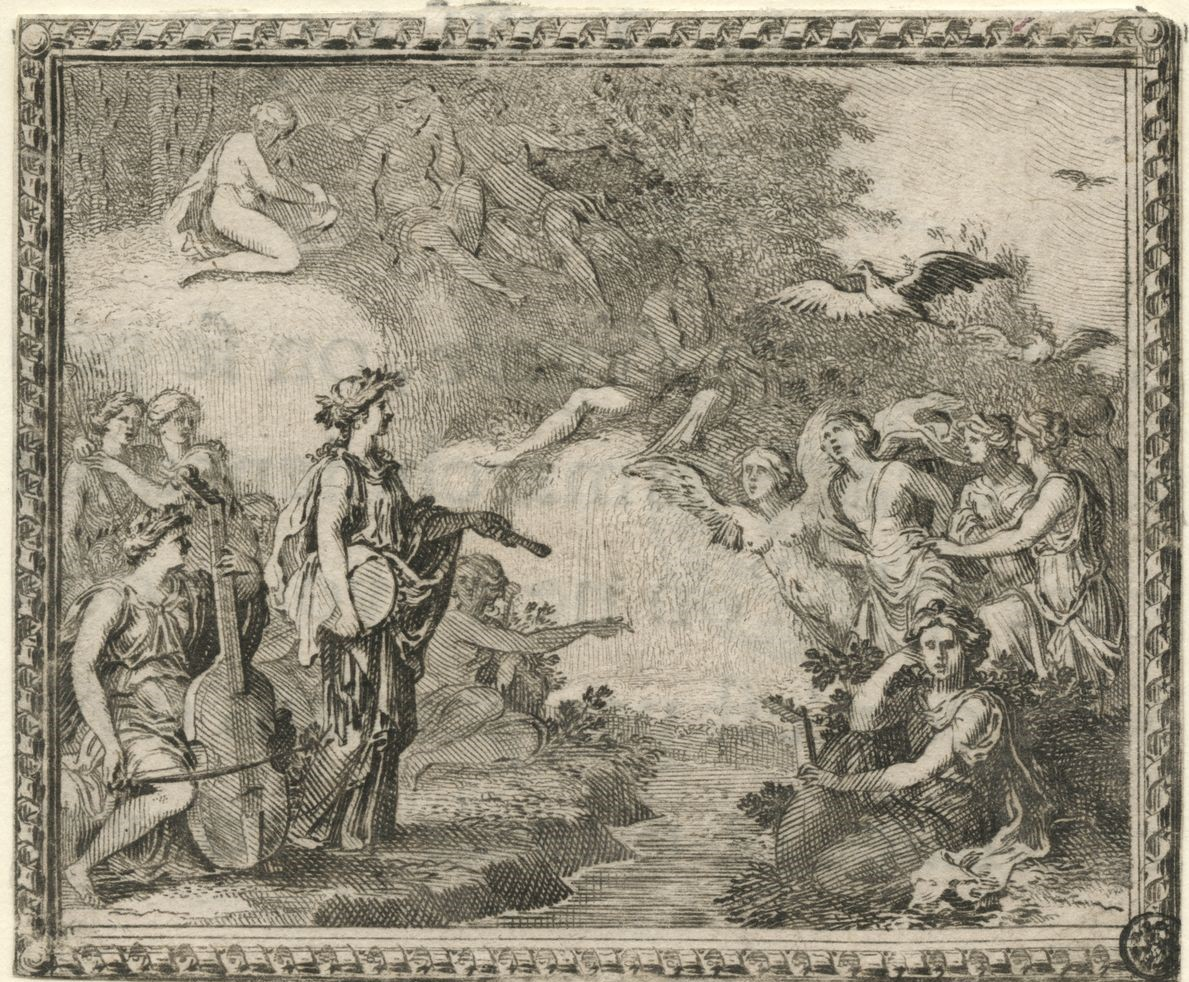
Sébastien Leclerc, Pierides turned into magpies, 1676, eau-forte, Lyon, Public Library

Calliope sang many stories from myths during the contest with the Pierides. The Muse recounted the abduction of Persephone by god of underworld Hades and the sorrow of the young girl's mother, the goddess Demeter, for the loss of her beloved daughter. Calliope also told the account of the unrequited love of the river god Alpheus to the nymph Arethusa, and also the adventure of hero Triptolemus in Scythia, where he encountered the envious King Lyncus. The following lines described the punishment of the victorious Muses to their vanquished opponents, the Pierides, being transformed into birds:

The greatest of our number ended thus her learned songs; and with concordant voice the chosen Nymphs adjudged the Deities, on Helicon who dwell, should be proclaimed the victors. But the vanquished nine began to scatter their abuse; to whom rejoined the goddess; "Since it seems a trifling thing that you should suffer a deserved defeat, and you must add unmerited abuse to heighten your offence, and since by this appears the end of our endurance, we shall certainly proceed to punish you according to the limit of our wrath." But these Emathian sisters laughed to scorn our threatening words; and as they tried to speak, and made great clamour, and with shameless hands made threatening gestures, suddenly stiff quills sprouted from out their finger-nails, and plumes spread over their stretched arms; and they could see the mouth of each companion growing out into a rigid beak.—And thus new birds were added to the forest.—While they made complaint, these jays that defile our groves, moving their stretched-out arms, began to float, suspended in the air. And since that time their ancient eloquence, their screaming notes, their tiresome zeal of speech have all remained.

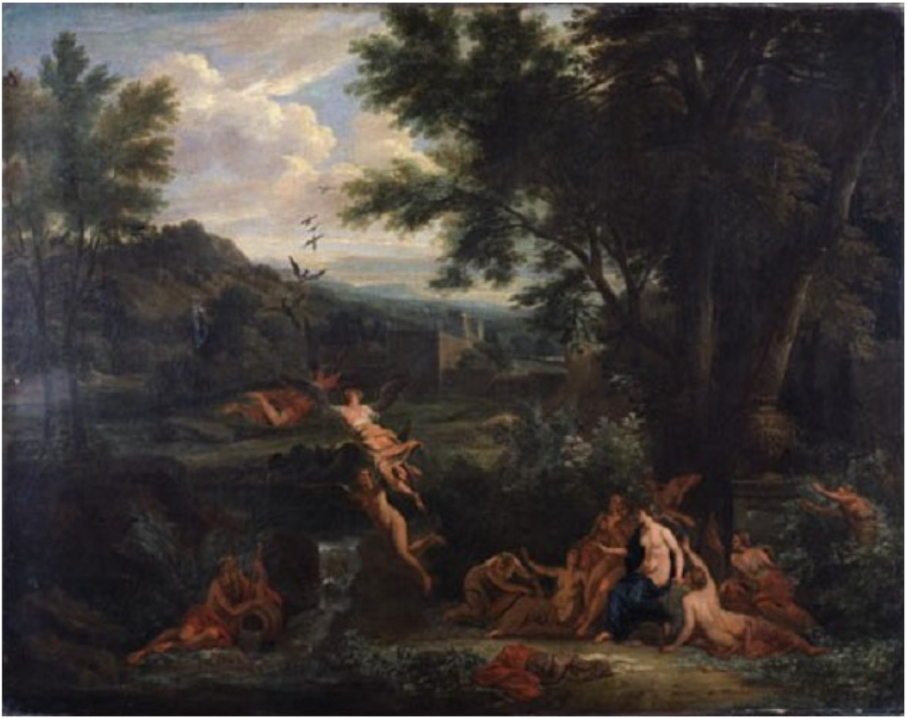
Pierides Changed into Magpies by Richard van Orle (1683–1732) at Museum of Fine Arts, Ghent, Belgium

=== Antoninus' account ===
Another retelling of the contest of Pierides and Muses appeared in Antoninus Liberalis' Metamorphoses:

Zeus made love to Mnemosyne in Pieria and became father of the Muses. Around about that time Pierus, was king of Emathia, sprung from its very soil. He had nine daughters. They were the ones who formed a choir in opposition to the Muses. And there was a musical contest in Helicon.

Whenever the daughters of Pierus began to sing, all creation went dark and no one would give an ear to their choral performance. But when the Muses sang, heaven, the stars, the sea and rivers stood still, while Mount Helicon, beguiled by the pleasure of it all, swelled skywards tilI, by the will of Poseidon, Pegasus checked it by striking the summit with his hoof.

Since these mortals had taken upon themselves to strive with goddesses, the Muses changed them into nine birds. To this day people refer to them as the grebe, the wryneck, the ortolan, the jay, the greenfinch, the goldfinch, the duck, the woodpecker and the dracontis pigeon.
