= Apollonis =

One of the muses in Greek mythology

Apollonis (/ˌæpəˈloʊnəs/; Ancient Greek: Ἀπoλλωνίς means "of Apollo") was one of the three younger Mousai Apollonides (Muses) in Greek mythology and daughters of Apollo, who were worshipped in Delphi where the Temple of Apollo and the Oracle were located. The three sisters, Cephisso, Apollonis, and Borysthenis, are also known as Nētē, Mesē, and Hypatē where their names are synonymous with those of the lowest, middle, and highest chords of a lyre, further characterizing the Muses as the daughters of Apollo.
