= Nete virus =

Virus classification
- (unranked): Virus
- Realm: Riboviria
- Species: Nete virus

Nete virus is a lineage of segmented RNA viruses infecting animals which was discovered in 2020. The name cones from the Quenyan word 'netë' which means 'another one' or 'one more'.
