= Aoede =

Muse in Greek mythology

According to the 2nd-century AD travel writer Pausanias, Aoede /eɪˈiːdiː/ (Ancient Greek: Ἀοιδή, lit. 'Song') was thought to be one of the three Muses at Mount Helicon, alongside Mneme and Melete. He writes that the Macedonian Pierus replaced them with the nine Muses. According to Robin Hard, the names Pausanias gives for these three Muses indicate that it is improbable he "is referring to a genuinely ancient tradition". In De Natura Deorum by the Roman writer Cicero, Aoede is described as one of the four oldest Muses, alongside Thelxinoe, Arche, and Melete.

She lends her name to the moon Jupiter XLI, also called Aoede, which orbits the planet Jupiter.
