= Muses =

Inspirational goddesses of literature, science, and the arts

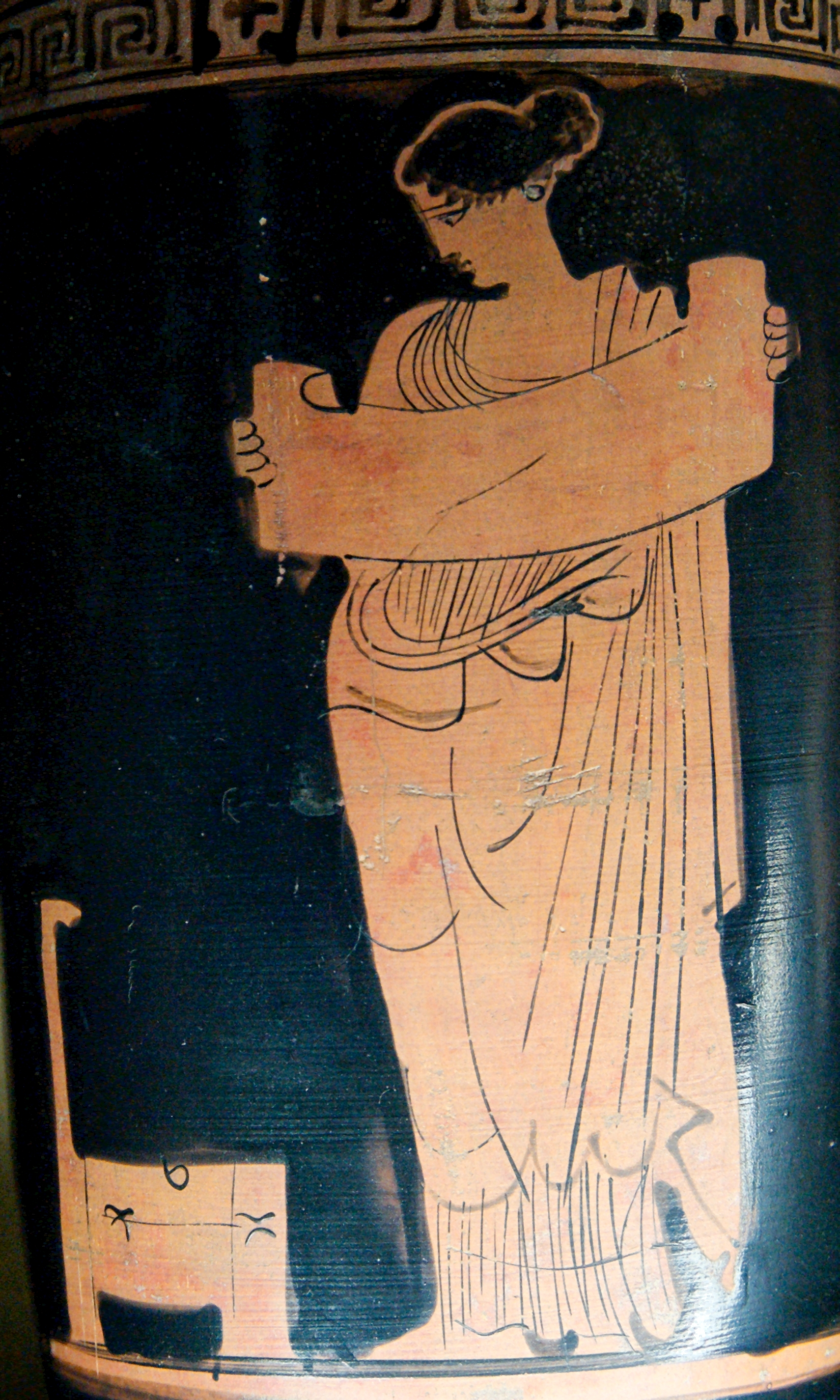
Muse, perhaps Clio, reading a scroll (Attic red-figure lekythos, Boeotia, c. 430 BC)

In ancient Greek religion and mythology, the Muses (Ancient Greek: Μοῦσαι, romanized: Moúsai, [ˈmuː.sai̯]; singular: Μοῦσα, Moúsa, [ˈmûː.sa]; Greek: Μούσες, romanized: Múses, [ˈmûː.ses]) were the inspirational goddesses of literature, science, and the arts. They were considered the source of the knowledge embodied in the poetry, lyric songs, and myths that were related orally for centuries in ancient Greek culture.

The number and names of the Muses differed by region, but from the Classical period the number of Muses was standardized to nine, and their names were generally given as Calliope, Clio, Polyhymnia, Euterpe, Terpsichore, Erato, Melpomene, Thalia, and Urania.

In modern figurative usage, a muse is a person who serves as someone's source of artistic inspiration.

== Etymology ==
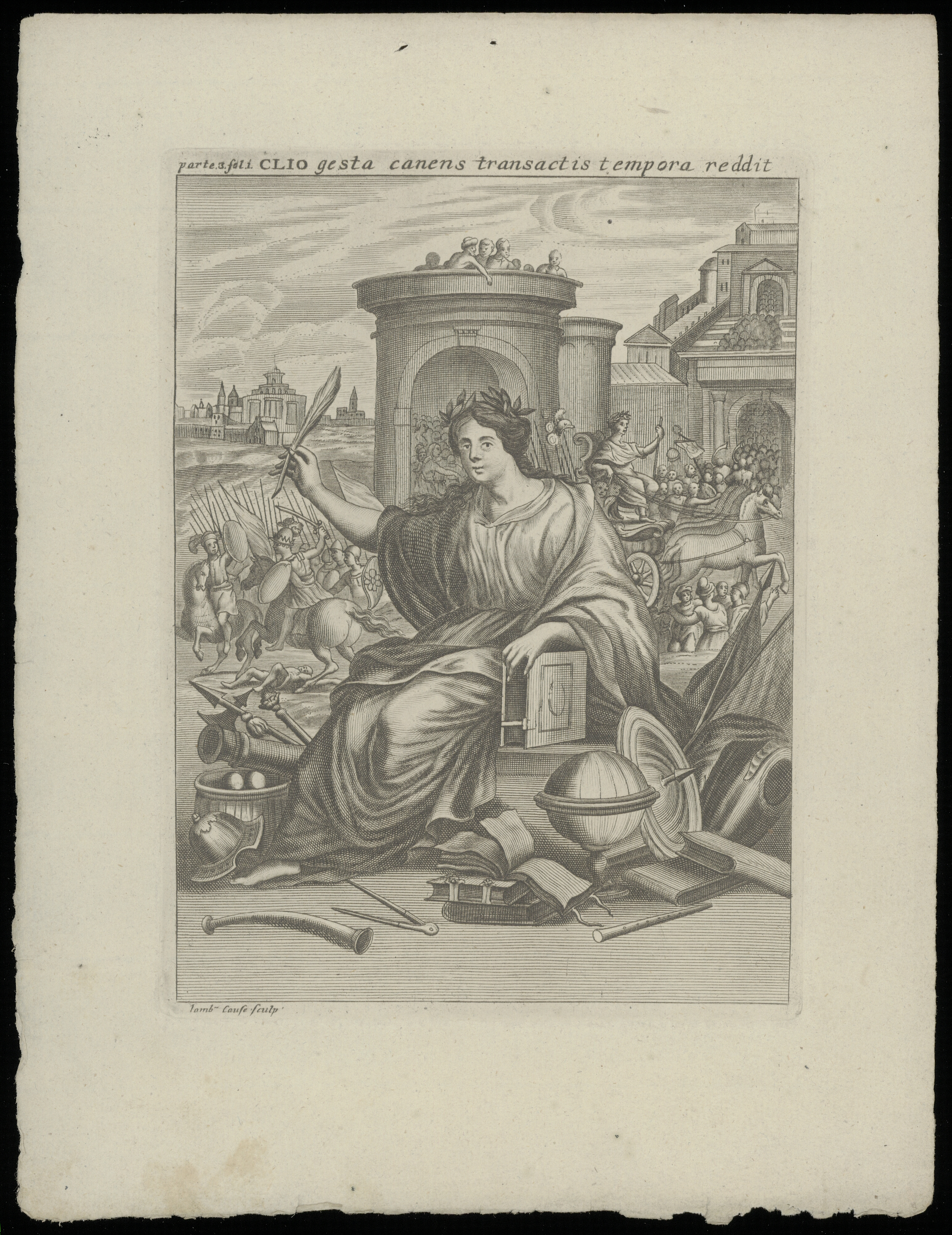
Print of Clio, made in the 16th–17th century. Preserved in the Ghent University Library.

The word Muses (Ancient Greek: Μοῦσαι, romanized: Moûsai) perhaps came from the o-grade of the Proto-Indo-European root *men- (the basic meaning of which is 'put in mind' in verb formations with transitive function and 'have in mind' in those with intransitive function), or from root *men- ('to tower, mountain') since all the most important cult-centres of the Muses were on mountains or hills. R. S. P. Beekes rejects the latter etymology and suggests that a Pre-Greek origin is also possible.

== Number and names ==
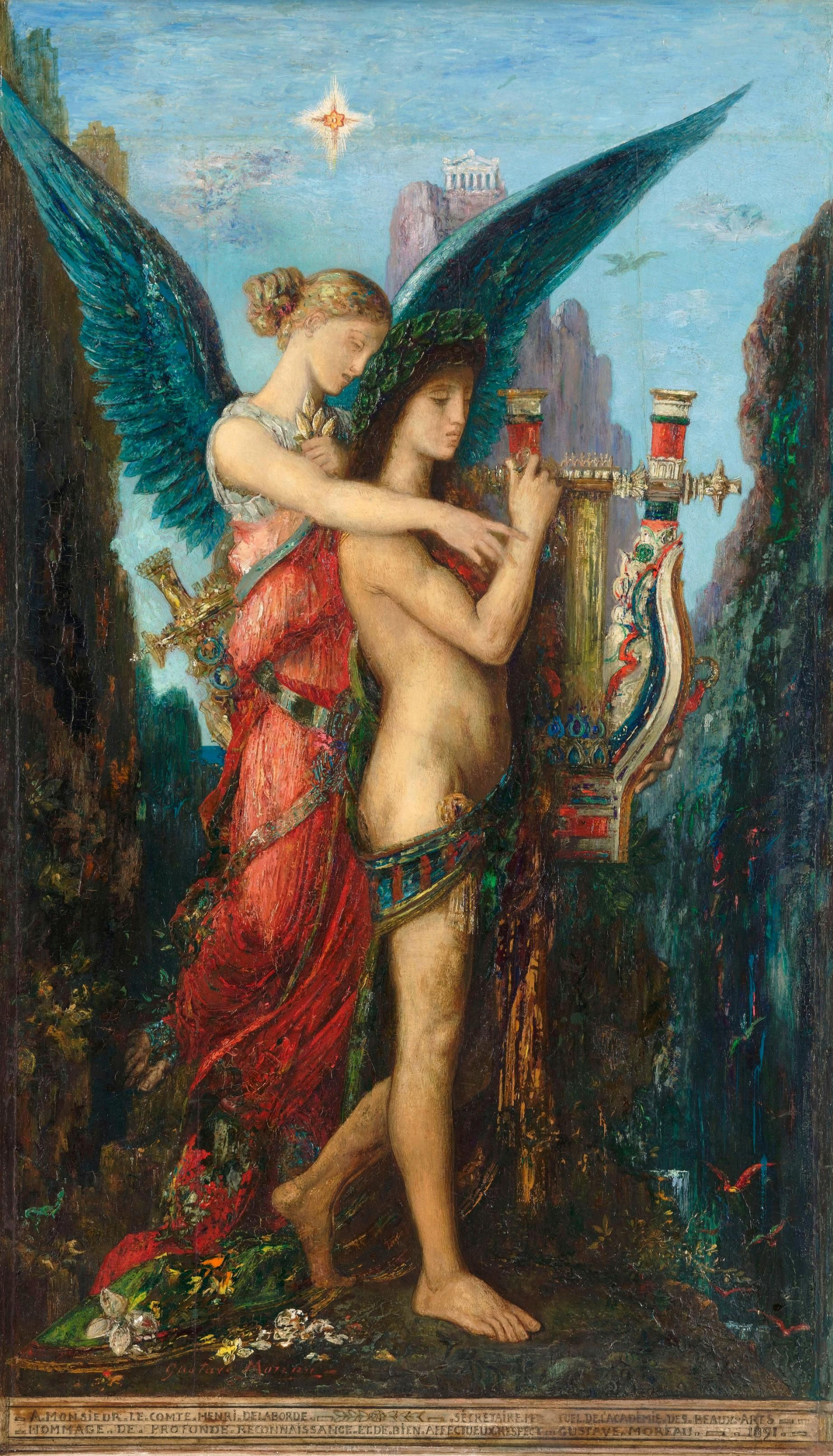
Gustave Moreau: Hesiod and the Muse (1891), Musée d'Orsay, Paris

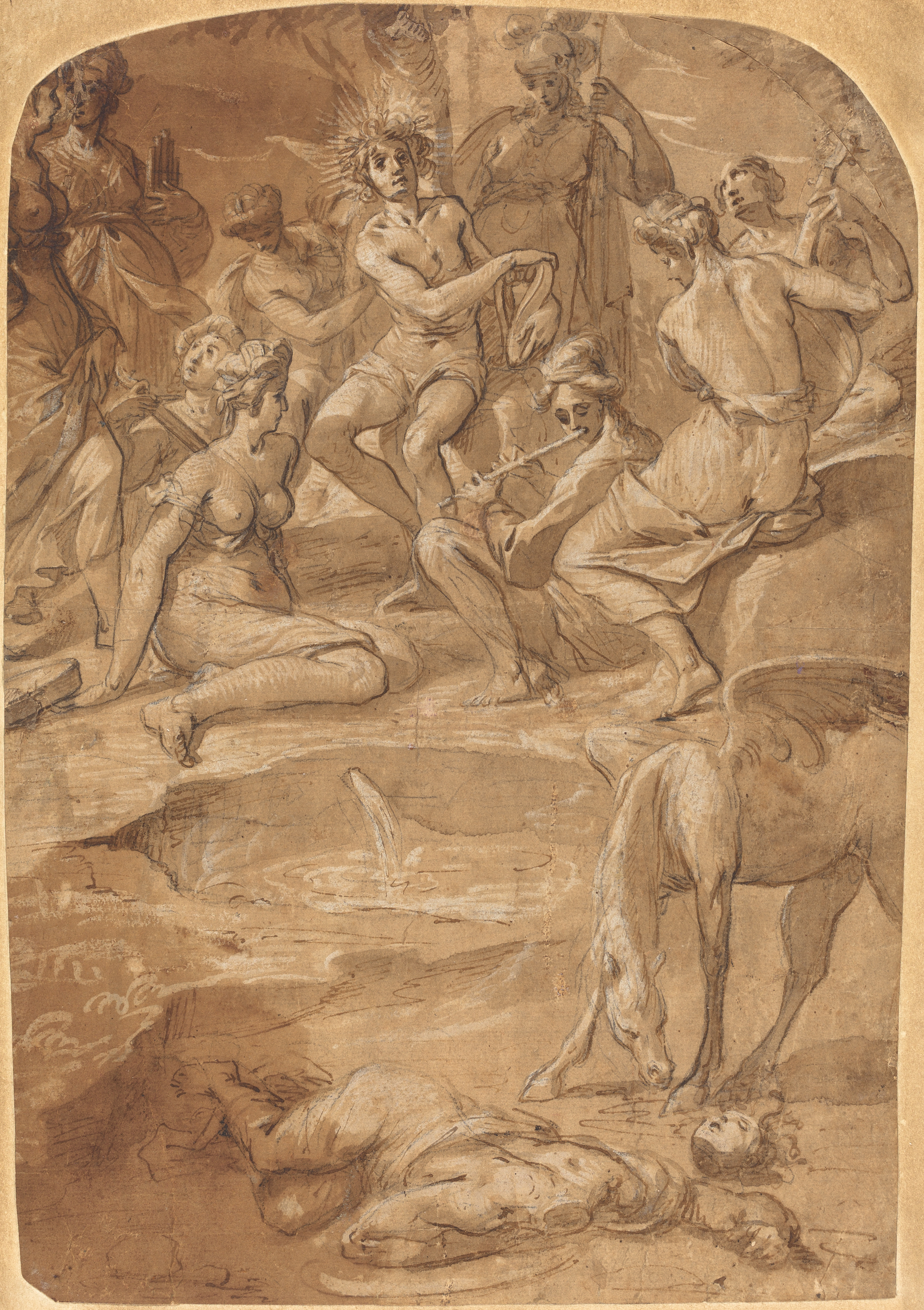
Apollo and the Muses on Mount Parnassus, c. 1650, by Johann Christoph Storer. Held at National Gallery of Art

The earliest known records of the Muses come from Boeotia (Boeotian muses). Some ancient authorities regarded the Muses as of Thracian origin. In Thrace, a tradition of three original Muses persisted.

In the first century BC, Diodorus Siculus, in his Library of History (Bibliotheca Historica), cited Homer and Hesiod to the contrary, observing:

Writers similarly disagree also concerning the number of the Muses; for some say that there are three, and others that there are nine, but the number nine has prevailed since it rests upon the authority of the most distinguished men, such as Homer and Hesiod and others like them.

Diodorus additionally states that Osiris first recruited the nine Muses, along with the satyrs, while passing through Aethiopia, before embarking on a tour of all Asia and Europe, teaching the arts of cultivation wherever he went.

According to Hesiod's account in his Theogony (c. 700 BC), generally followed by the writers of antiquity, the Nine Muses were the nine daughters of Zeus and Mnemosyne (i.e., "Memory" personified), figuring as personifications of knowledge and the arts, especially poetry, literature, dance and music.

The Roman scholar Varro (116–27 BC) relates that there are only three Muses: one born from the movement of water, another who makes sound by striking the air, and a third who is embodied only in the human voice. They were called Melete ("Practice"), Mneme ("Memory") and Aoide ("Song"). The Quaestiones Convivales of Plutarch (46–120 AD) also report a tradition of three ancient Muses (9.14.2–4).

However, the classical understanding of the Muses tripled their triad and established a set of nine goddesses, who embody the arts and inspire creation with their graces through remembered and improvised song and mime, writing, traditional music, and dance. It was not until Hellenistic times that the following systematic set of functions became associated with them, and even then some variation persisted both in their names and in their attributes:

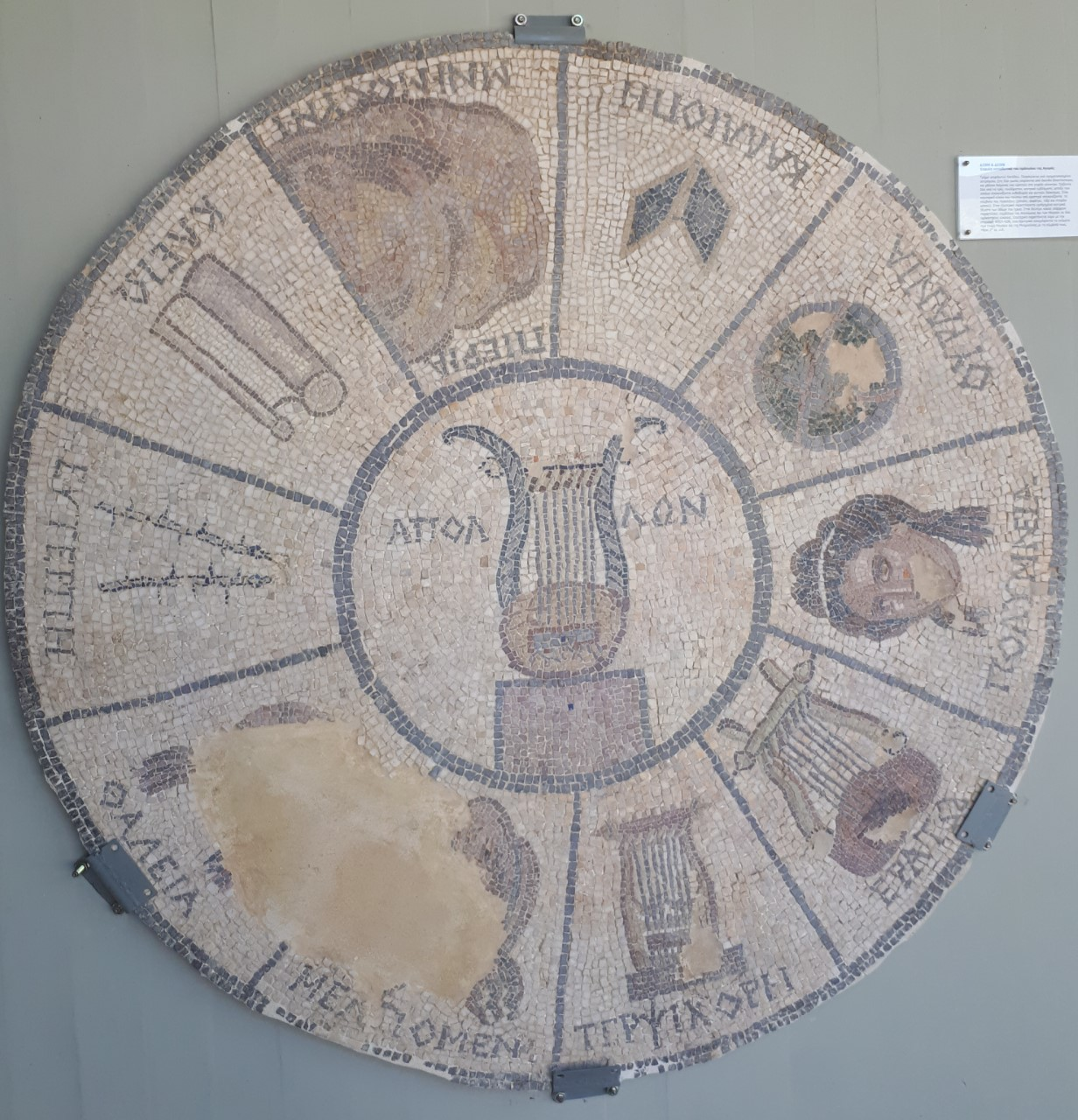
Mosaic with symbols of each Muse and Mnemosyne, 1st century BC, Archaeological Museum of Ancient Elis.

- Calliope (epic poetry)
- Clio (history)
- Polyhymnia (hymn and mime)
- Euterpe (song and elegiac poetry)
- Terpsichore (chorus and dance)
- Erato (lyric choral poetry)
- Melpomene (tragedy)
- Thalia (light verse and comedy)
- Urania (astronomy and astrology)

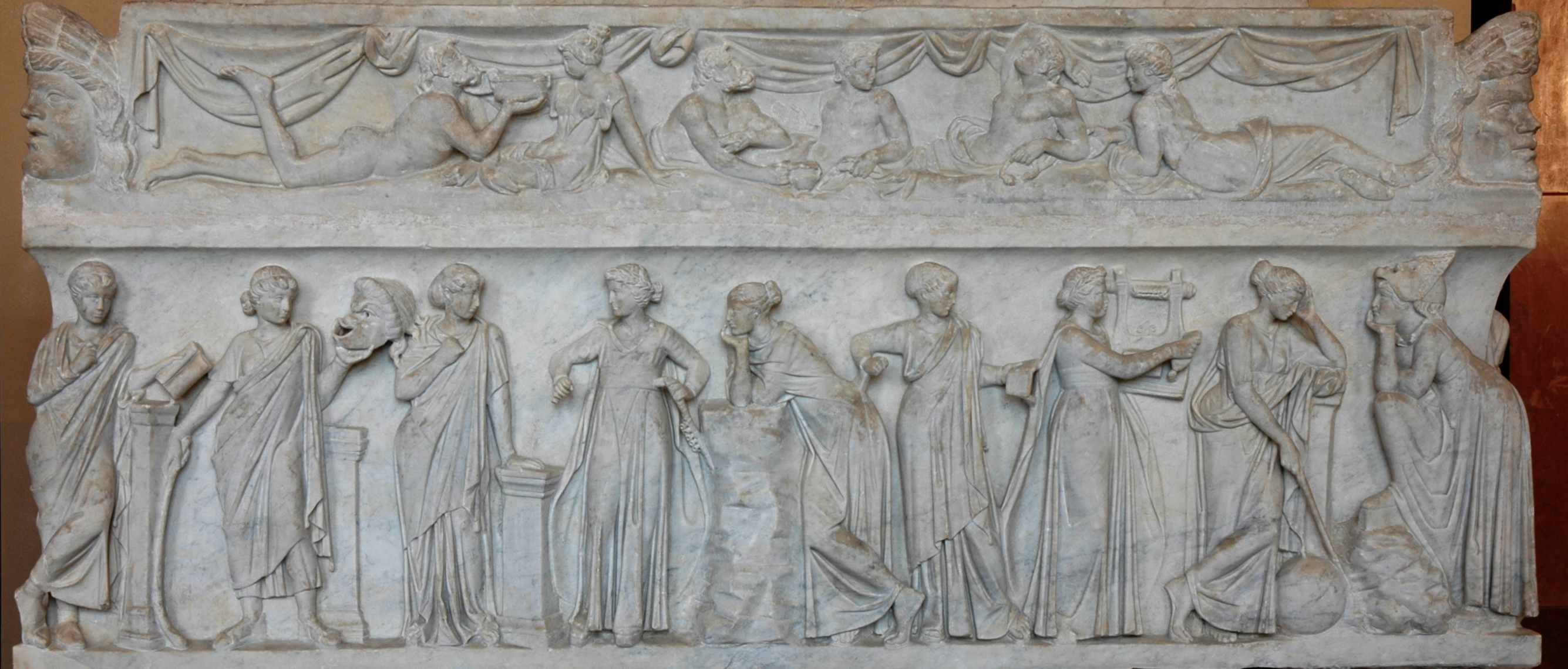
The nine Muses on a Roman sarcophagus (second century AD), Louvre, Paris

According to Pausanias, who wrote in the later second century AD, there were originally three Muses, worshipped on Mount Helicon in Boeotia: Aoide ('song' or 'tune'), Melete ('practice' or 'occasion'), and Mneme ('memory'). Together, these three form the complete picture of the preconditions of poetic art in cult practice.

In Delphi too three Muses were worshipped, but with other names: Nete, Mese, and Hypate, which are assigned as the names of the three chords of the ancient musical instrument, the lyre.

Alternatively, later they were called Cephisso, Apollonis, and Borysthenis – names which characterize them as daughters of Apollo.

A later tradition recognized a set of four Muses: Thelxinoë, Aoide, Archē, and Melete, said to be daughters of Zeus and Plusia or of Ouranos. One of the people frequently associated with the Muses was Pierus. By some he was called the father (by a Pimpleian nymph, called Antiope by Cicero) of a total of seven Muses, called Neilṓ (Νειλώ), Tritṓnē (Τριτώνη), Asōpṓ (Ἀσωπώ), Heptápora (Ἑπτάπορα), Achelōís, Tipoplṓ (Τιποπλώ) and Rhodía (Ῥοδία).

Ancient writers often called Boeotia Aonia, and because the Muses often visited Mount Helicon in Boeotia, they were called Aonides and Aoniae Sorores.

== Mythology ==
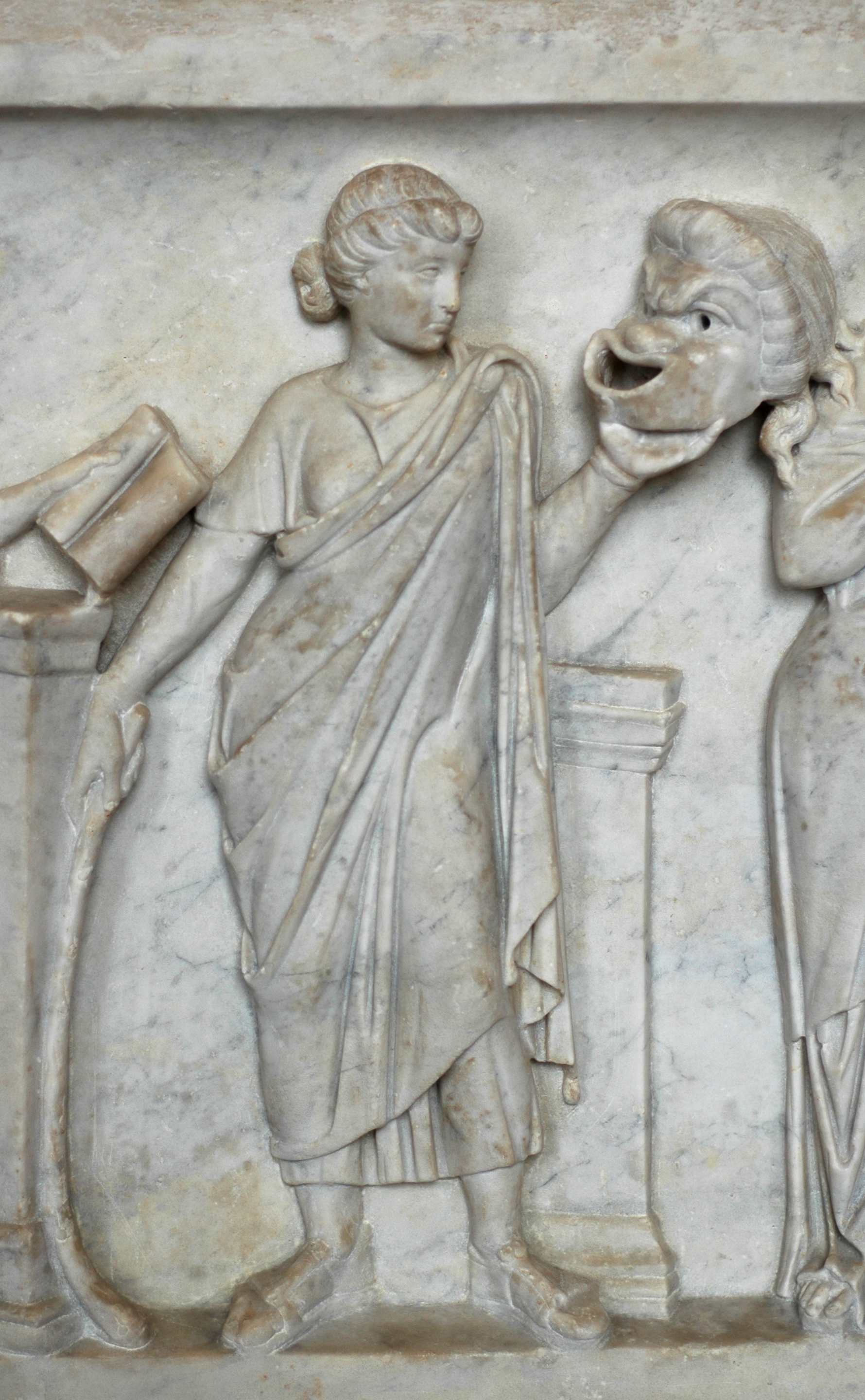
Thalia, Muse of comedy, holding a comic mask (detail from the "Muses Sarcophagus")

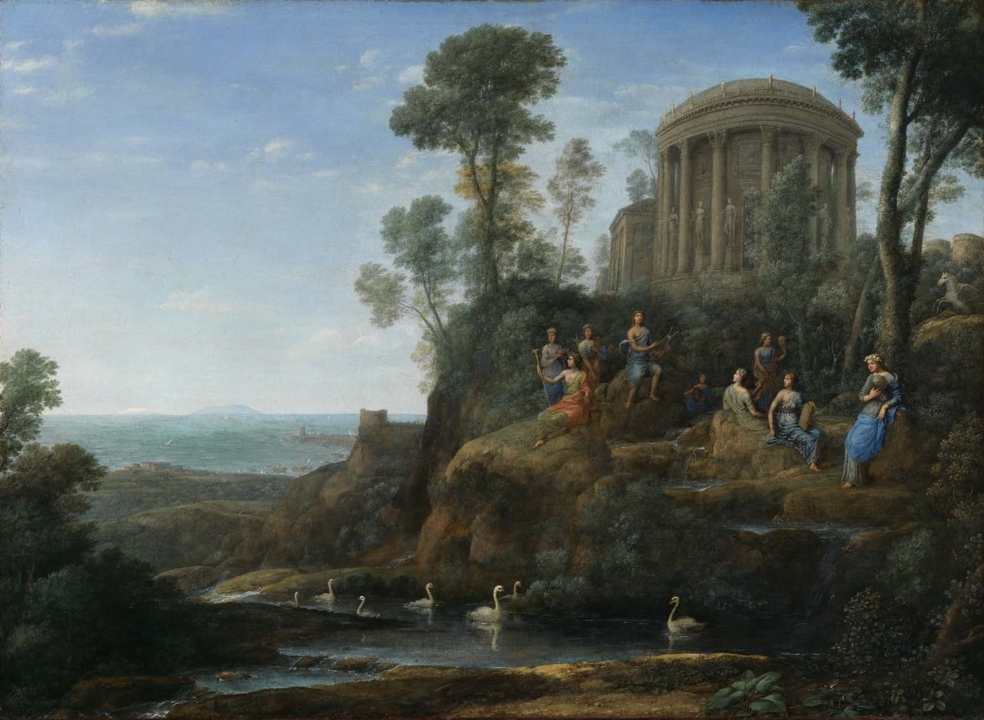
Apollo and the Muses on Mount Helicon (1680) by Claude Lorrain

According to Hesiod's Theogony (seventh century BC), they were daughters of Zeus, king of the gods, and Mnemosyne, Titan goddess of memory. Hesiod narrates that the Muses brought to people forgetfulness, that is, the forgetfulness of pain and the cessation of obligations.

For Alcman and Mimnermus, they were even more primordial, springing from the early deities Uranus and Gaia. Gaia is Mother Earth, an early mother goddess who was worshipped at Delphi from prehistoric times, long before the site was rededicated to Apollo, possibly indicating a transfer to association with him after that time.

Sometimes the Muses are referred to as water nymphs, associated with the springs of Helicon and with Pieris. It was said that the winged horse Pegasus touched his hooves to the ground on Helicon, causing four sacred springs to burst forth, from which the Muses, also known as pegasides, were born. Athena later tamed the horse and presented him to the Muses (compare the Roman inspiring nymphs of springs, the Camenae, the Völva of Norse mythology and also the apsaras in the mythology of classical India).

Classical writers set Apollo as their leader, Apollon Mousēgetēs ('Apollo Muse-leader'). In one myth, the Muses judged a contest between Apollo and Marsyas. They also gathered the pieces of the dead body of Orpheus, son of Calliope, and buried them in Leibethra.

Pausanias records a tradition of two generations of Muses; the first are the daughters of Ouranos and Gaia, the second of Zeus and Mnemosyne. Another, rarer genealogy is that they are daughters of Harmonia (the daughter of Aphrodite and Ares), which contradicts the myth in which they were dancing at the wedding of Harmonia and Cadmus.

According to one version of Adonis' death, the Muses became angry with Aphrodite because she caused many of them to fall in love and bear children. In revenge, they sang a beautiful hunting song that excited Adonis and lured him into the hunt, where he was killed by a boar. In a different version, Ares either transformed himself into the boar or attacked and killed Adonis as he charged at it.

=== Children ===
Calliope had two sons, Ialemus and Orpheus, with Apollo. In another version of the story, the father of Orpheus was the Thracian king Oeagrus, but Apollo adopted him and taught him the skill of lyre while Calliope trained him in singing.

Linus was said to have been the son of Apollo and one of the Muses, either Calliope or Terpsichore or Urania. Rhesus was the son of Strymon and Calliope or Euterpe.

The Sirens were the children of Achelous and Melpomene or Terpsichore. Kleopheme was the daughter of Erato and Malos. Hyacinth was the son of Clio, according to an unpopular account.

Hymenaeus was assigned as Apollo's son by one of the Muses, either Calliope, or Clio, or Terpsichore, or Urania. Corybantes were the children of Thalia and Apollo.

=== Contests ===
Several myths describe contests between the Muses and their challengers.

Thamyris was a poet and musician known for his skill in singing and playing the cithara. He challenged the Muses to a musical contest, boasting that he could overcome them in song and that his voice was better than theirs. According to some accounts, he agreed that if he won he would sleep with all the Muses, but if he lost they could deprive him of whatever they wished. The Muses defeated him and, in their anger, took away his gift of song, made him forget his music, and deprived him of his sight.

The sirens also challenged the Muses. In the sanctuary of Hera in Coroneia was a statue created by Pythodorus of Thebes, depicting Hera holding the sirens. According to the myth, Hera persuaded the sirens to challenge the Muses to a singing contest. After the Muses won, they are said to have plucked the sirens' feathers and used them to make crowns for themselves. According to Stephanus of Byzantium, the sirens, overwhelmed by their loss, cast off their feathers from their shoulders, turned white and then threw themselves into the sea. As a result, the nearby city was named Aptera ("featherless") and the nearby islands were called the Leukai ("the white ones"). John Tzetzes recounts that after defeating the sirens, the Muses crowned themselves with the sirens' wings, except for Terpsichore who was their mother, adding that the city of Aptera named after this event. Furthermore, in one of his letters, Julian the Emperor mentions the Muses' victory over the sirens.

In other stories, nine daughters challenged the Muses. According to a myth from Ovid's Metamorphoses—alluding to the connection of Pieria with the Muses—Pierus, king of Macedon, had nine daughters he named after the nine Muses, believing that their skills were a great match to the Muses. He thus challenged the Muses to a match, resulting in his daughters, the Pierides, being turned into chattering magpies for their presumption. Antoninus Liberalis called them the Emathides and wrote that they were transformed into nine different birds: the grebe, the wryneck, the ortolan, the jay, the greenfinch, the goldfinch, the duck, the woodpecker, and the dracontis pigeon.

== Cult ==
The Muses had several temples and shrines in ancient Greece, their two main cult centres being Mount Helikon in Boiotia, which holds the Valley of the Muses, and Pieria in Macedonia. Strabo wrote:

"Helikon, not far distant from Parnassos, rivals it both in height and in circuit; for both are rocky and covered with snow, and their circuit comprises no large extent of territory. Here are the temple of the Mousai and Hippukrene and the cave of the Nymphai called the Leibethrides; and from this fact one might infer that those who consecrated Helikon to the Mousai were Thrakians, the same who dedicated Pieris and Leibethron and Pimpleia [in Pieria] to the same goddesses. The Thrakians used to be called Pieres, but, now that they have disappeared, the Macedonians hold these places."

The cult of the Muses was also commonly connected to that of Apollo.

== Emblems ==
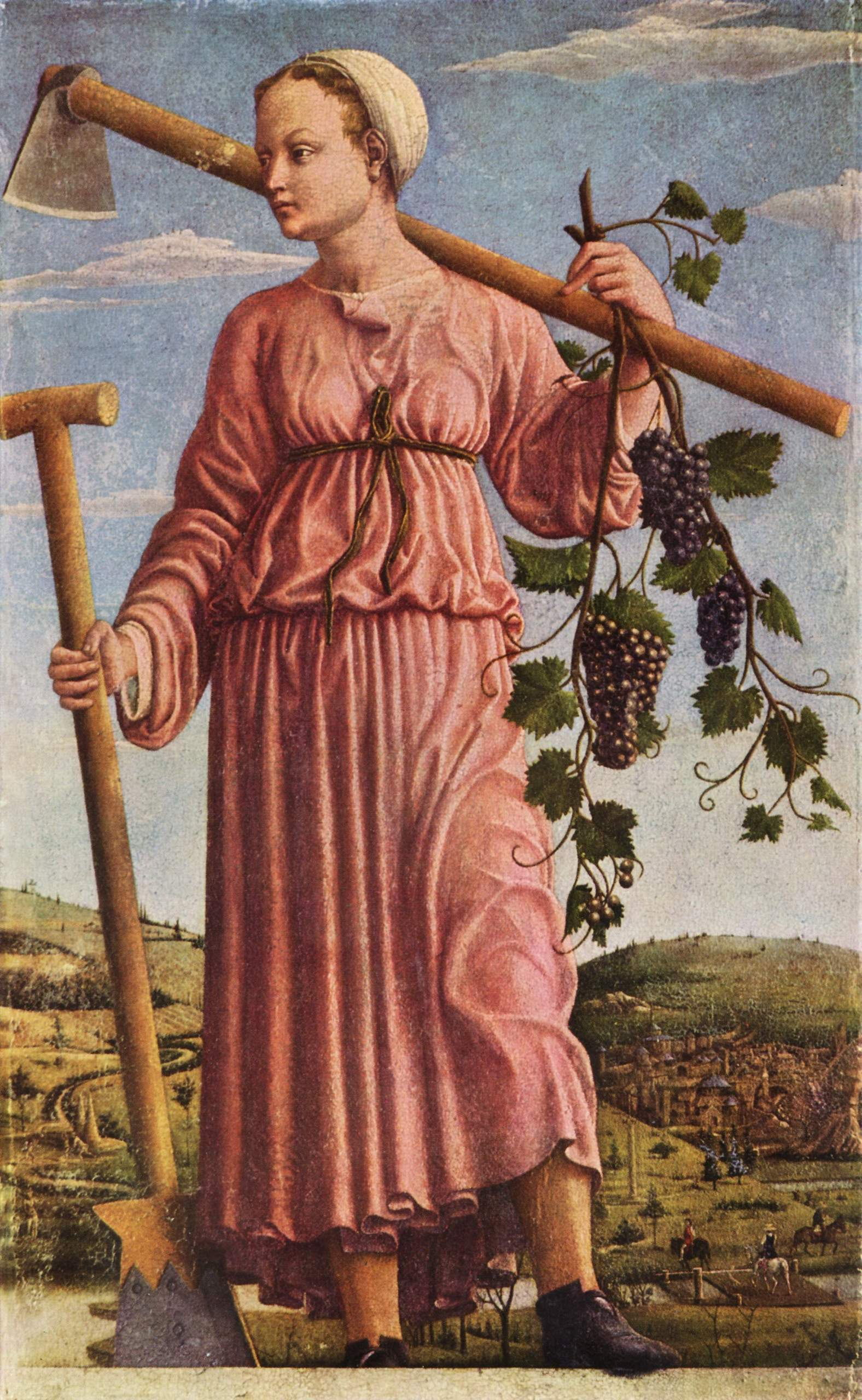
Polyhymnia, the Muse of sacred poetry, sacred hymn and eloquence as well as agriculture and pantomime.

The following table lists the Classical names and attributes of the standard list of the nine Muses, as well as their various associated symbols:

| Muse | Attribute | Symbols |
|---|---|---|
| Calliope | Epic poetry | Writing tablet, Stylus, Lyre (image) |
| Clio | History | Scrolls, Books, Cornett, Laurel wreath |
| Polyhymnia | Mime | Veil, Grapes (referring to her as an agricultural goddess) (image) |
| Euterpe | Song and elegiac poetry | Aulos (an ancient Greek musical instrument like a double oboe), panpipes, laurel wreath |
| Terpsichore | Light verse and dance | Lyre, Plectrum |
| Erato | Lyric choral poetry | Cithara (image) |
| Melpomene | Tragedy | Tragic mask, sword (or any kind of blade), club, kothornos (boots) |
| Thalia | Comedy | Comic mask, Ivy wreath, Shepherd's crook |
| Urania | Astronomy (Christian poetry in later times) | Globe and compass |

Some Greek writers give the names of the nine Muses as Kallichore, Helike, Eunike, Thelxinoë, Terpsichore, Euterpe, Eukelade, Dia, and Enope.

In Renaissance and Neoclassical art, the dissemination of emblem books such as Cesare Ripa's Iconologia (1593 and many further editions) helped standardize the depiction of the Muses in sculpture and painting, so they could be distinguished by certain props. These props, or emblems, became readily identifiable by the viewer, enabling one immediately to recognize the muse and the art with which she had become associated. Here again, Calliope (epic poetry) carries a writing tablet; Clio (history) carries a scroll and books; Euterpe (song and elegiac poetry) carries a double-pipe, the aulos; Erato (lyric poetry) is often seen with a lyre and a crown of roses; Melpomene (tragedy) is often seen with a tragic mask; Polyhymnia (sacred songs) is often seen with a pensive expression; Terpsichore (chorus dancing and choral song) is often seen dancing and carrying a lyre; Thalia (comedy) is often seen with a comic mask; and Urania (astronomy) carries a pair of compasses and the celestial globe.

== Functions ==
=== In society ===
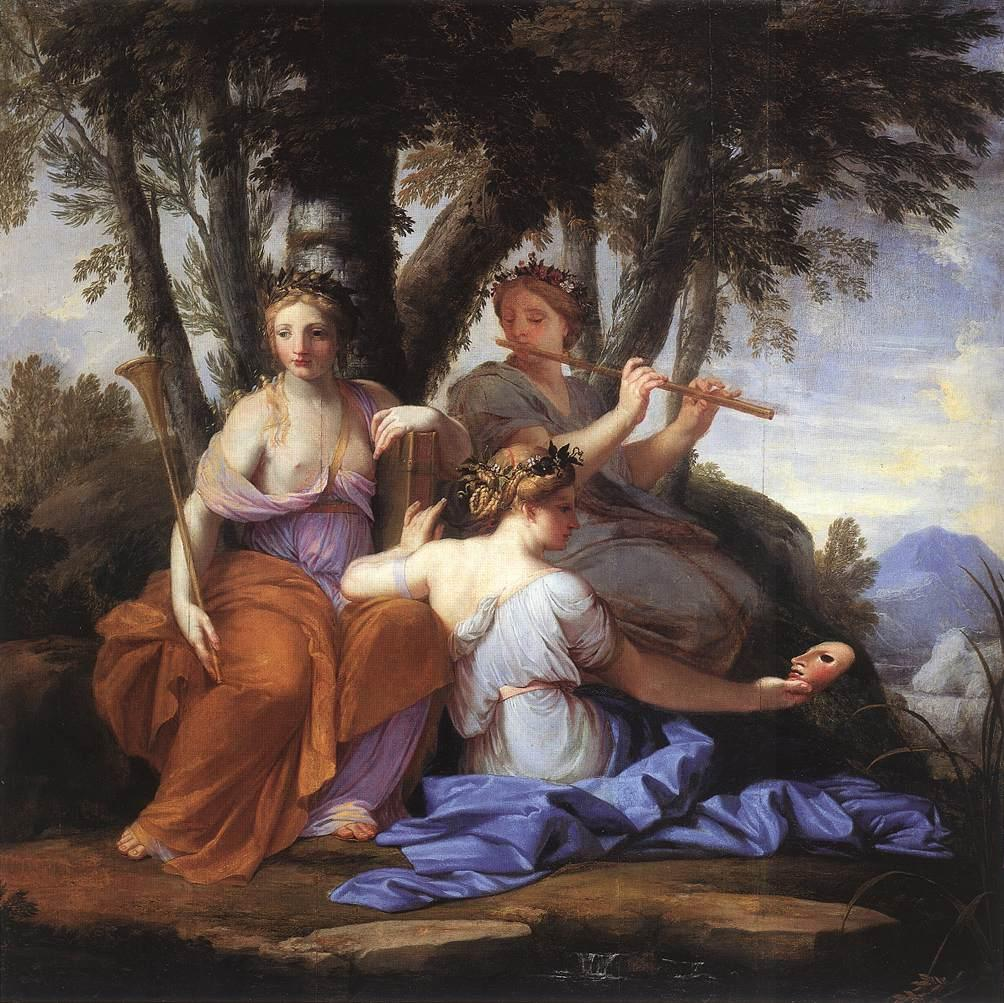
Clio, Euterpe, and Thalia, by Eustache Le Sueur, c. 1652–1655

The Greek word mousa is a common noun as well as a type of goddess: it literally means 'art' or 'poetry'. According to Pindar, to "carry a mousa" is 'to excel in the arts'. The word could derive from the Indo-European root *men-, which is also the source of Greek Mnemosyne and mania, English mind, mental and monitor, Sanskrit mantra and Avestan Mazda.

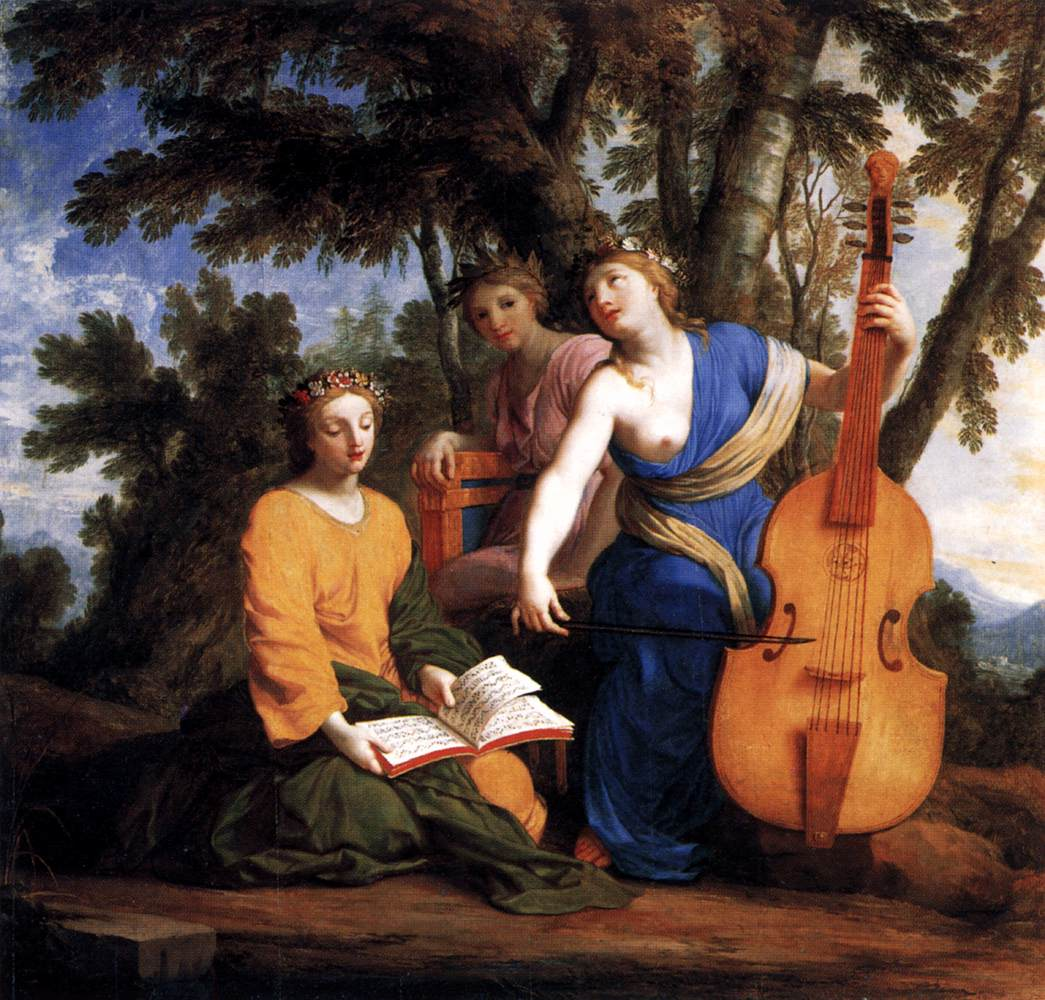
Melpomene, Erato, and Polyhymnia, by Eustache Le Sueur, c. 1652–1655

The Muses, therefore, were both the embodiments and sponsors of performed metrical speech: mousike (whence the English term music) was just "one of the arts of the Muses". Others included science, geography, mathematics, philosophy, and especially art, drama, and inspiration. In the archaic period, before the widespread availability of books (scrolls), this included nearly all of learning. The first Greek book on astronomy, by Thales, took the form of dactylic hexameters, as did many works of pre-Socratic philosophy. Both Plato and the Pythagoreans explicitly included philosophy as a sub-species of mousike. The Histories of Herodotus, whose primary medium of delivery was public recitation, were divided by Alexandrian editors into nine books, named after the nine Muses.

For poet and "law-giver" Solon, the Muses were "the key to the good life"; since they brought both prosperity and friendship. Solon sought to perpetuate his political reforms by establishing recitations of his poetry—complete with invocations to his practical-minded Muses—by Athenian boys at festivals each year. He believed that the Muses would help inspire people to do their best.

=== In literature ===
Melpomene and Polyhymnia, Palacio de Bellas Artes, Mexico

Ancient authors and some later authors and artists invoke Muses when writing poetry, hymns or epic history. Ancient authors' invocations often occur near the beginning of their work. It asks for help or inspiration from the Muses, or simply invites the Muse to sing directly through the author.

Originally, the invocation of the Muse was an indication that the speaker was working inside the poetic tradition, according to the established formulas. For example:

These things declare to me from the beginning,

ye Muses who dwell in the house of Olympus,

and tell me which of them first came to be.

—Hesiod (c. 700 BCE), Theogony (Hugh G. Evelyn-White translation, 2015)

Sing to me of the man, Muse, the man of twists and turns

driven time and again off course, once he had plundered

the hallowed heights of Troy.

—Homer (c. 700 - 600 BCE), in Book I of The Odyssey (Robert Fagles translation, 1996)

O Muse! the causes and the crimes relate;

What goddess was provok'd, and whence her hate;

For what offence the Queen of Heav'n began

To persecute so brave, so just a man; [...]

—Virgil (c. 29 - 19 BCE), in Book I of the Aeneid (John Dryden translation, 1697)

Besides Homer and Virgil, other famous works that included an invocation of the Muse are the first of the carmina by Catullus, Ovid's Metamorphoses and Amores, Dante's Inferno (Canto II), Chaucer's Troilus and Criseyde (Book II), Shakespeare's Henry V (Act 1, Prologue), his 38th sonnet, and Milton's Paradise Lost (openings of Books 1 and 7).

=== In cults and modern museums ===
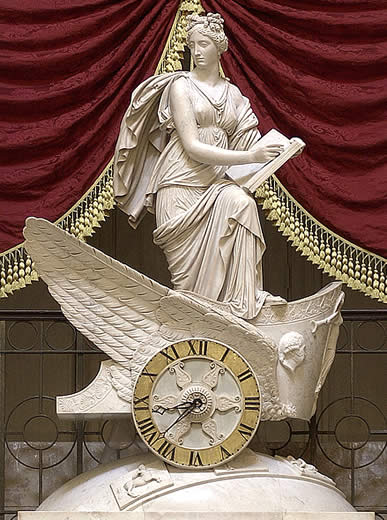
The Car of History, a chariot clock by Carlo Franzoni, 1819, depicting Clio (housed in the National Statuary Hall Collection of the United States Capitol)

When Pythagoras arrived at Croton, his first advice to the Crotoniates was to build a shrine to the Muses at the center of the city, to promote civic harmony and learning. Local cults of the Muses often became associated with springs or with fountains. The Muses were sometimes called Aganippides, a name derived from the sacred spring Aganippe at the foot of Mount Helicon, whose waters were believed to grant inspiration. Other fountains, Hippocrene and Pirene, were also important locations associated with the Muses. Some sources occasionally referred to the Muses as "Corycides" (or "Corycian nymphs") after a cave on Mount Parnassos, called the Corycian Cave. Pausanias referred to the Muses by the surnames "Ardalides" or "Ardaliotides", because of a sanctuary to them at Troezen said to have been built by the mythical Ardalus.

The Muses were venerated especially in Boeotia, in the Valley of the Muses near Helicon, and in Delphi and the Parnassus, where Apollo became known as Mousēgetēs ('Muse-leader') after the sites were rededicated to his cult.

Often Muse-worship was associated with the hero-cults of poets: the tombs of Archilochus on Thasos and of Hesiod and Thamyris in Boeotia all played host to festivals in which poetic recitations accompanied sacrifices to the Muses. The Library of Alexandria and its circle of scholars formed around a mousaion (i.e., 'museum' or shrine of the Muses) close to the tomb of Alexander the Great. Many Enlightenment figures sought to re-establish a "Cult of the Muses" in the 18th century. A famous Masonic lodge in pre-Revolutionary Paris was called Les Neuf Soeurs ('The Nine Sisters', that is, the Nine Muses); Voltaire, Benjamin Franklin, Danton, and other influential Enlightenment figures attended it. As a side-effect of this movement the word museum (originally, 'cult place of the Muses') came to refer to a place for the public display of knowledge.

Museia (Μούσεια) was a festival dedicated to Muses which was held every fifth year on the lower slopes of Mount Helicon in Boeotia. There was also another festival which was called Museia, which was celebrated in schools.

=== Places named after the Muses ===
In New Orleans, Louisiana, there are streets named for all nine. It is commonly held that the local pronunciation of the names has been colorfully anglicized in an unusual manner by the "Yat" dialect. The pronunciations are actually in line with the French, Spanish, and Creole roots of the city.

== Modern use in the arts ==
The Muses are explicitly used in modern English to refer to an artistic inspiration, as when one cites one's own artistic muse, and also implicit in words and phrases such as amuse, museum (Latinised from mouseion—a place where the Muses were worshipped), music, and musing upon. In current literature, the influential role that the Muse plays has been extended to the political sphere.

== Gallery ==
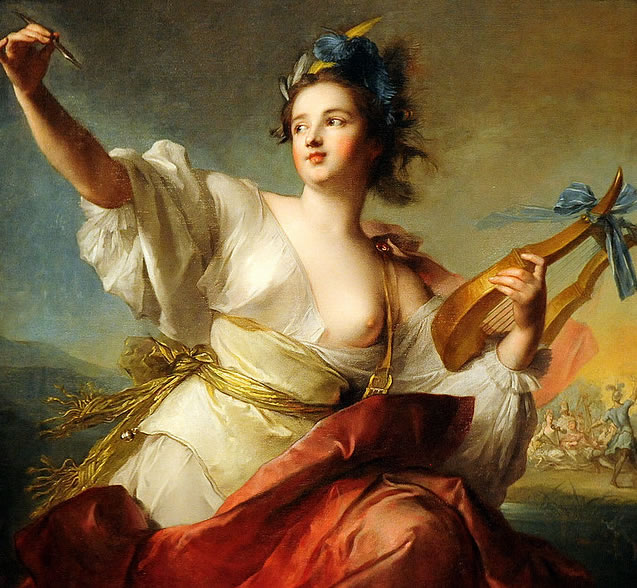
Terpsichore

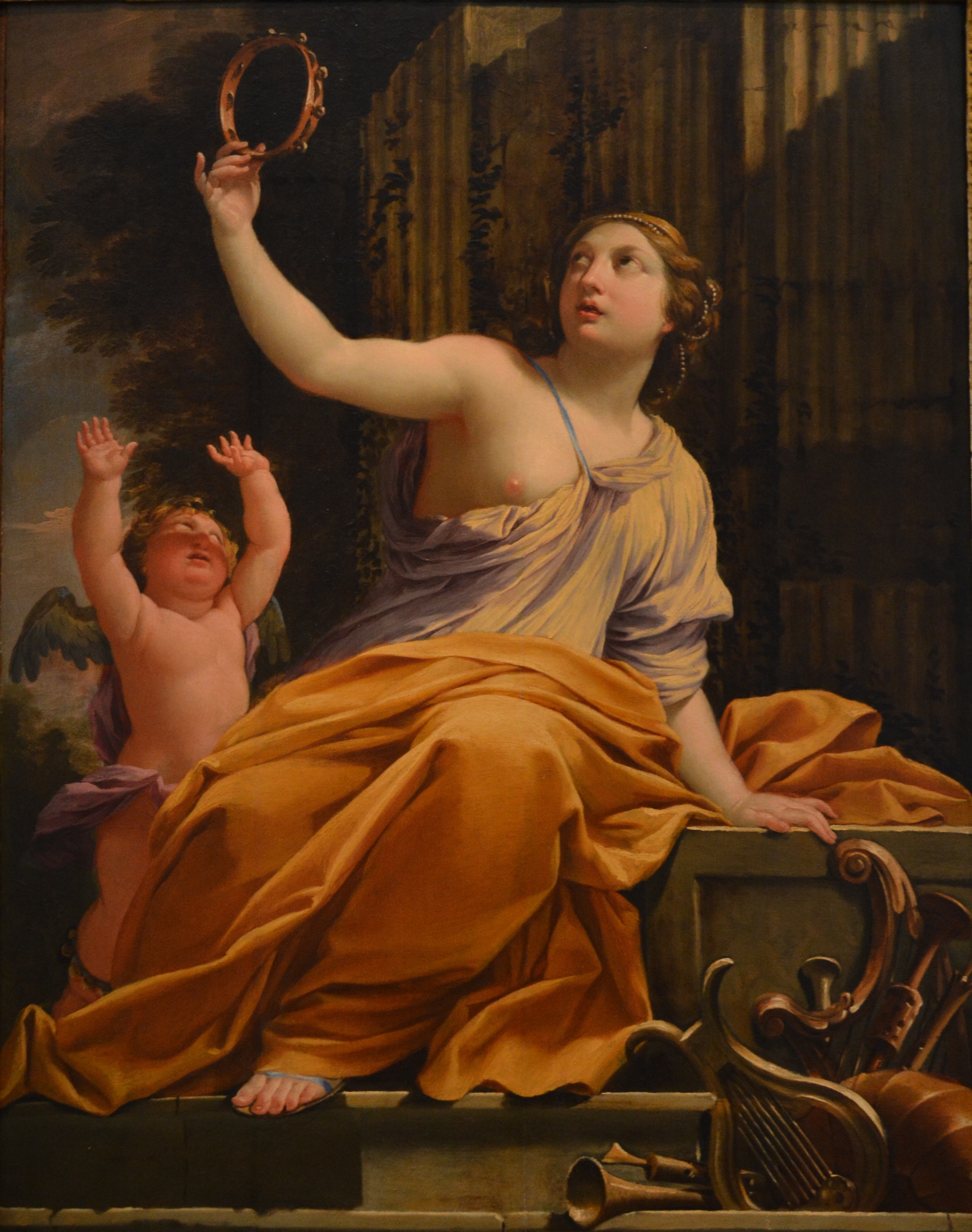
Erato

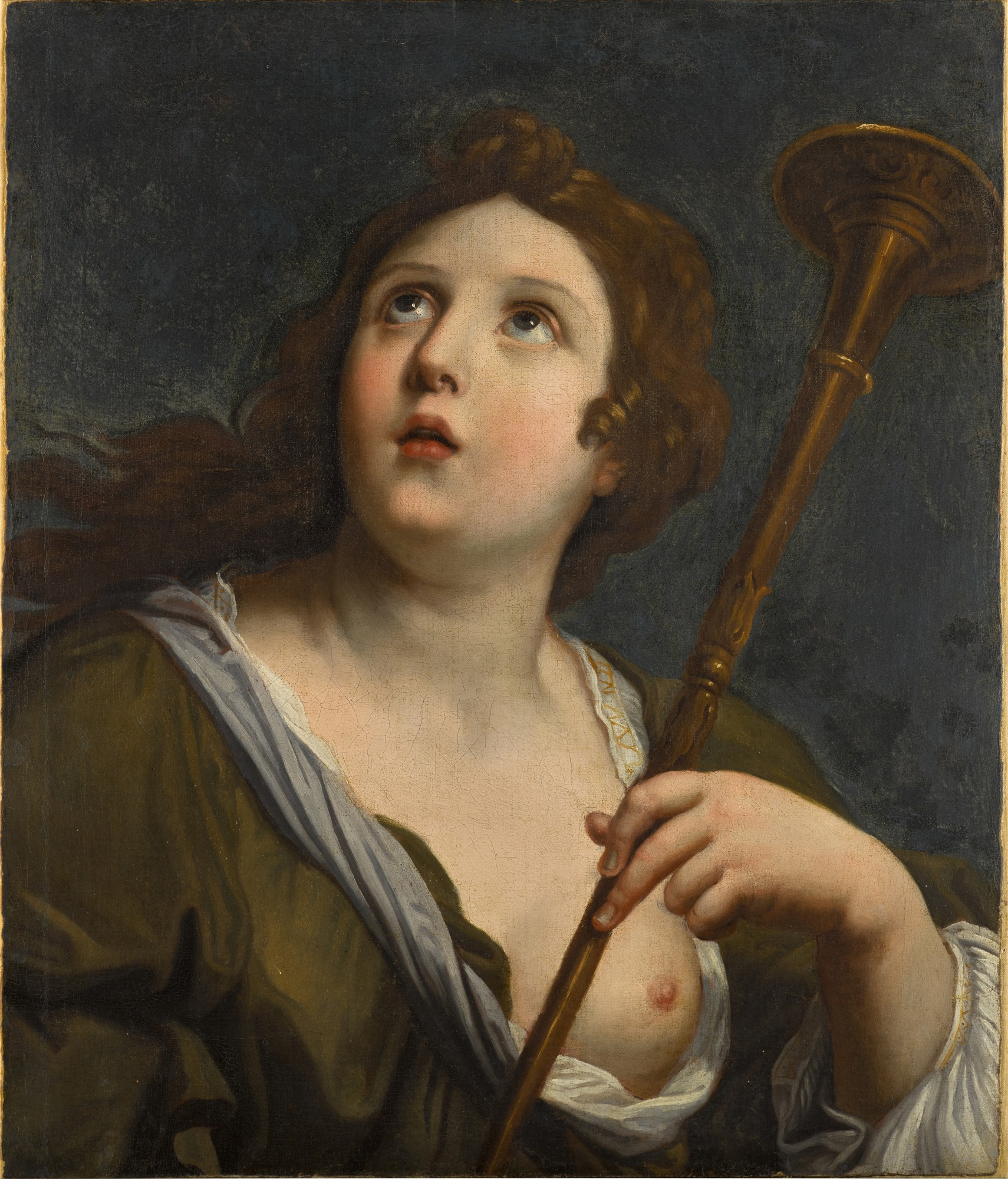
Clio

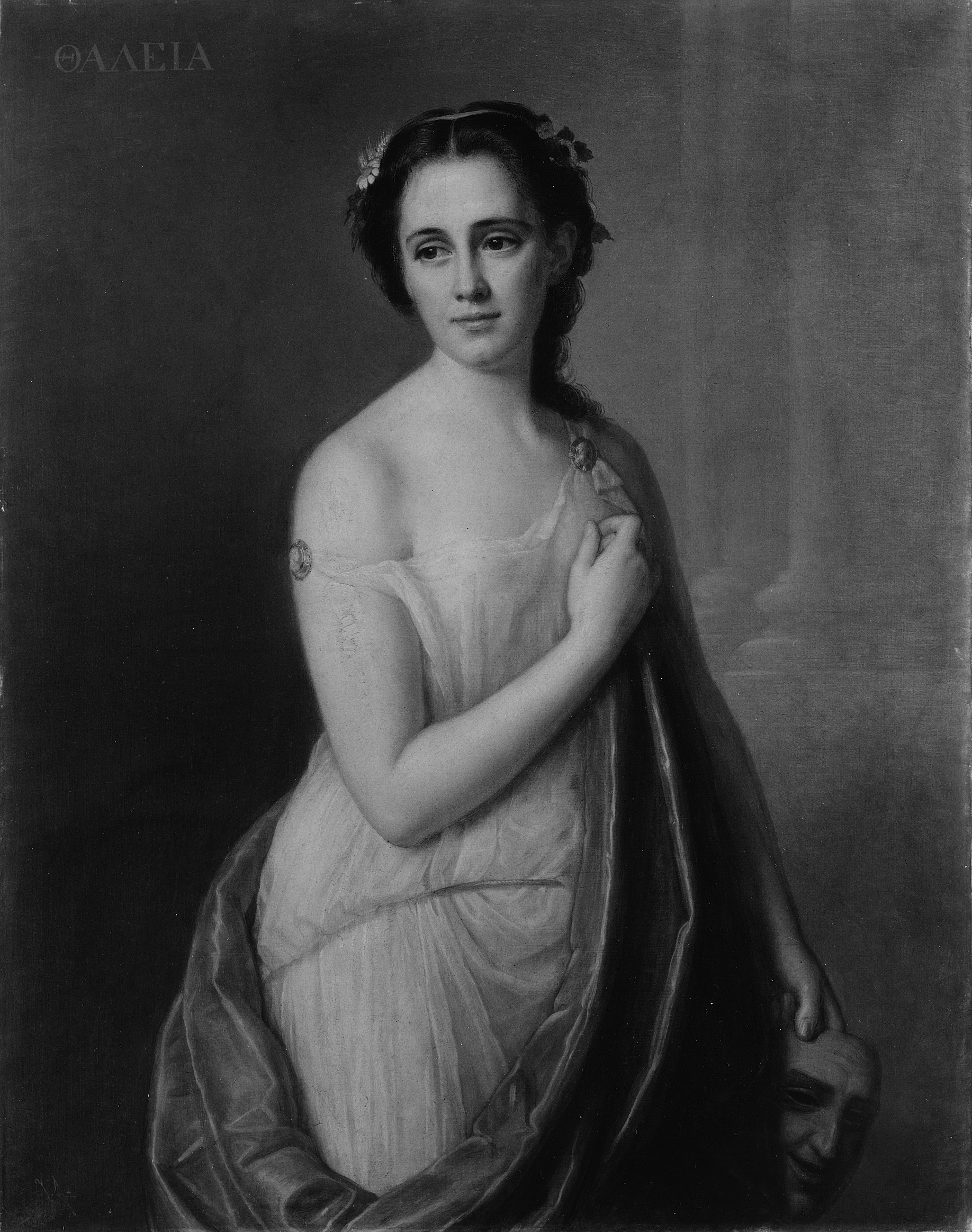
Thalia

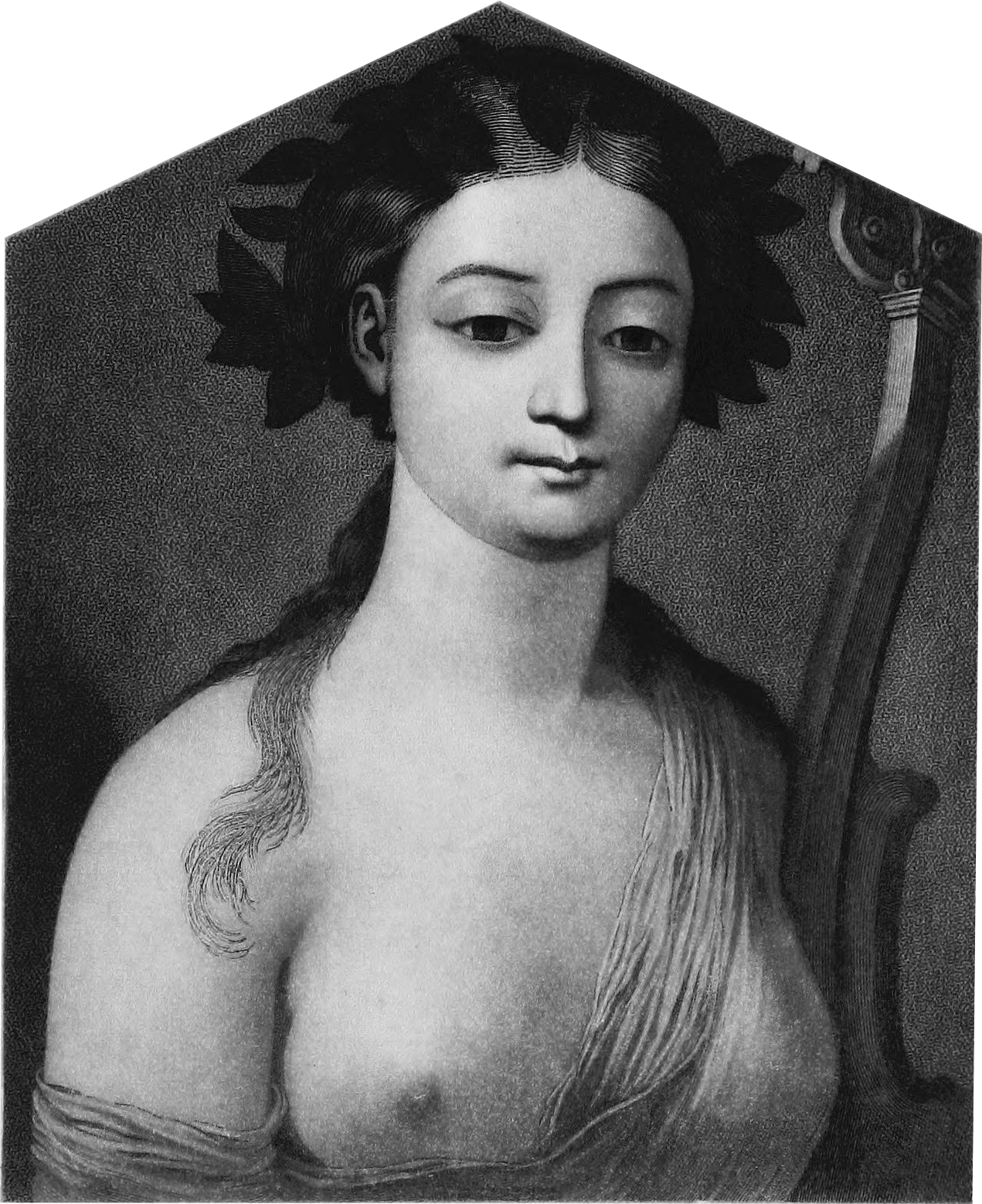
Polyhymnia

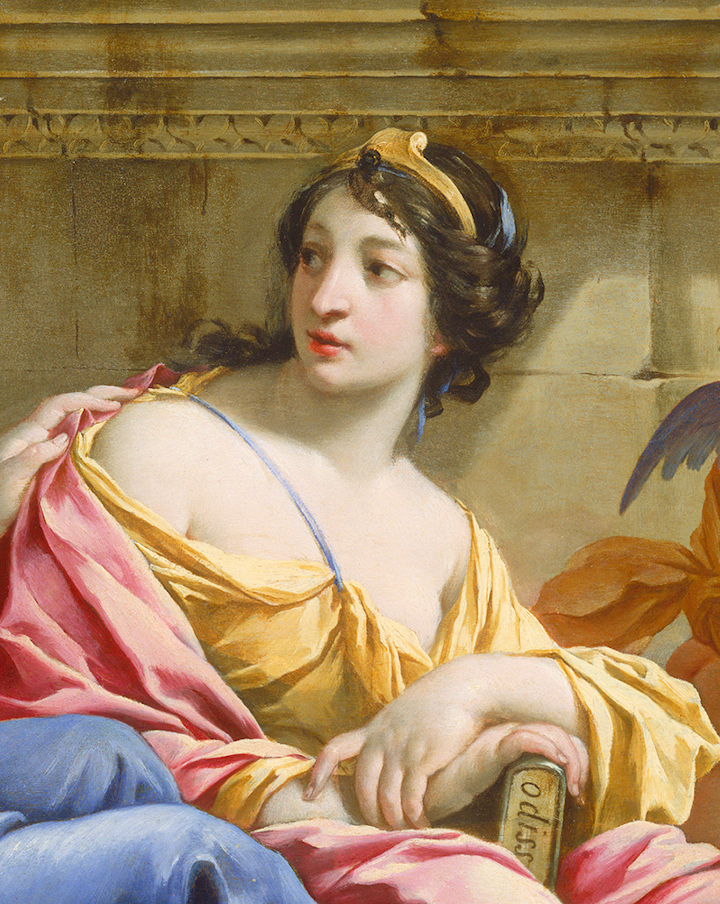
Calliope

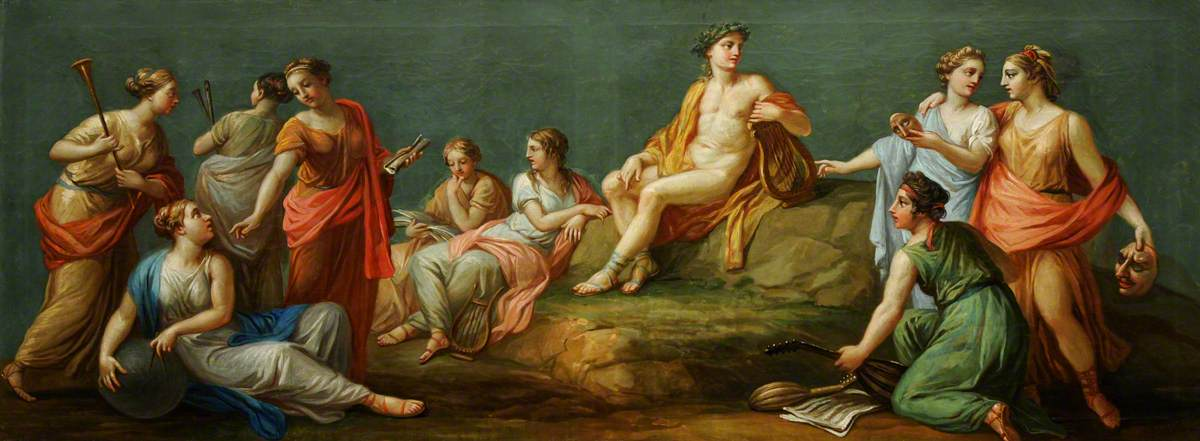
Apollo and the Muses

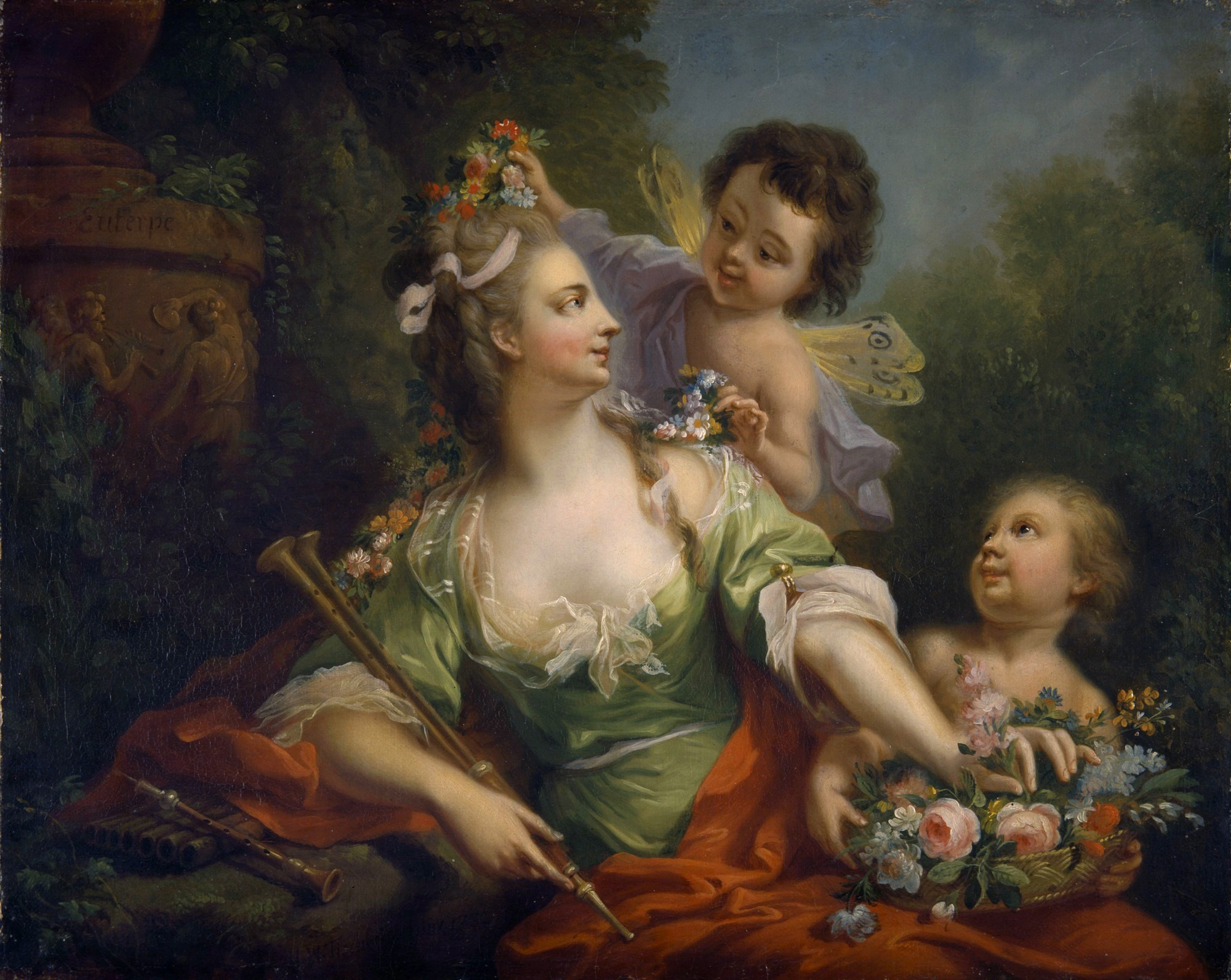
Euterpe

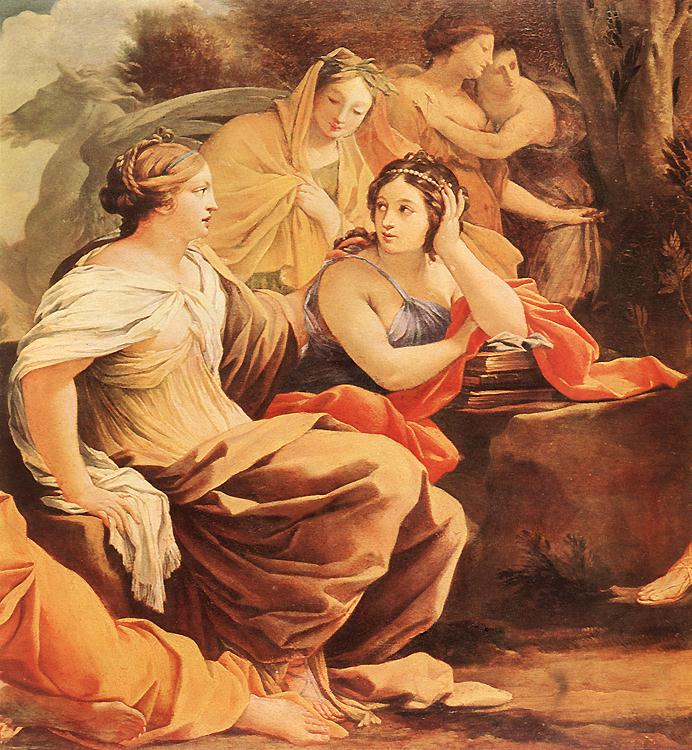
Parnassus

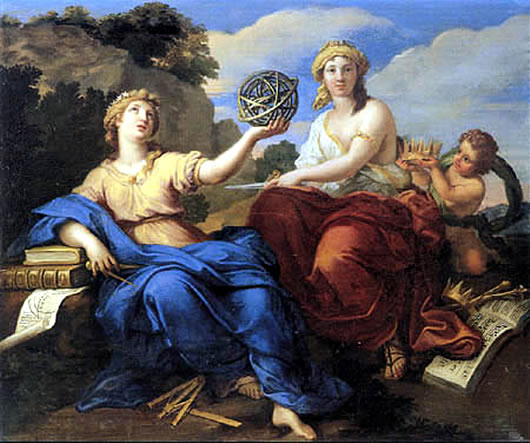
Urania and Melpomene

== Genealogy ==
The Muses's family tree, according to Hesiod's Theogony

Uranus | Gaia | Pontus
Oceanus | Tethys | Hyperion | Theia | Crius | Eurybia
The Rivers | The Oceanids | Helios | Selene | Eos | Astraeus | Pallas | Perses
Cronus | Rhea | Coeus | Phoebe
Hestia | Hera | Hades | Zeus | Leto | Asteria
Demeter | Poseidon
Iapetus | Clymene (or Asia) | Mnemosyne | (Zeus) | Themis
Atlas | Menoetius | Prometheus | Epimetheus | The Horae
CLIO | THALIA | TERPSICHORE | POLYHYMNIA | CALLIOPE
EUTERPE | MELPOMENE | ERATO | URANIA

== See also ==
- Apsara
- Artistic inspiration
- Divine inspiration
- Leibethra
- Pimpleia
- Saraswati
- Muses in popular culture
