= Arche (mythology) =

Ancient Greek muse

Archē (Ancient Greek: Ἀρχή) in ancient Greek religion was the muse of origins and beginnings. She was one of the 4 (alternatively) identified Boeotian muses recognized in Delphi, also known as the Mouse Titanides.

As time passed, nine muses dedicated to the arts, sciences, and literature were uniformly recognized around Greece, now known as the Olympian Muses. The nine muses were daughters of Zeus and Mnemosyne, and are more familiar in classical descriptions of the muses than the earlier four.

This was largely adapted into the ancient Roman religion as well. According to Cicero's De Natura Deorum ("On the Nature of the Gods"), "As to the Muses, there were at first four—Thelxiope, Aœde, Arche, and Melete—daughters of the second Jupiter." Cicero identifies the main nine muses as "daughters of the third Jupiter and Mnemosyne."

== See also ==
- List of Greek deities
