= Mneme =

Muse in Greek mythology

According to the 2nd-century AD travel writer Pausanias, Mneme /ˈniːmiː/ (Ancient Greek: Μνήμη, lit. 'Memory') was thought to be one of the three Muses at Mount Helicon, alongside Aoede and Melete. He writes that the Macedonian Pierus replaced them with the nine Muses. According to Robin Hard, the names Pausanias gives for these three Muses indicate that it is improbable he "is referring to a genuinely ancient tradition".

== Namesake ==
- Mneme Lake in Antarctica is named after the muse.
- Jupiter's moon Mneme is named after the muse.
