= Cephisso =

Muse in Greek mythology

In Greek mythology, Cephisso, Cephiso, or Kephiso (/səˈfaɪsoʊ/;Ancient Greek: Κηφισώ) was one of the three Muses that were daughters of Apollo. Her sisters were Apollonis and Borysthenis.
