= Borysthenis =

Set of mythological Greek figures

In Greek mythology, Borysthenis (Ancient Greek: Βορυσθενίς, romanized: Borysthenís) may refer to two distinct individuals:

- Borysthenes, one of the three Muses that were daughters of Apollo. Her sisters were Apollonis and Cephisso.
- the Scythian Earth-and-Water goddess Api, who was called Borysthenis because she was the daughter of the god of the Borysthenēs river (now the Dnipro river).

== Sources ==
- Braund, David (2007). "Greater Olbia: Ethnic, Religious, Economic, and Political Interactions in the Region of Olbia, c.600–100 BC". In Braund, David; Kryzhintskiy, S. D. [in Russian] (eds.). Classical Olbia and the Scythian World: From the Sixth Century BC to the Second Century AD. Oxford, United Kingdom: Oxford University Press. pp. 33–77. ISBN 978-0-197-26404-1.
- Bukharin, Mikhail Dmitrievich [in Russian] (2013). "Колаксай и его братья (античная традиция о происхождении царской власти у скифов" [Kolaxais and his Brothers (Classical Tradition on the Origin of the Royal Power of the Scythians)]. Аристей: вестник классической филологии и античной истории [Aristaeus: Journal of Classical Philology and Ancient History] (in Russian). 3: 20–80.
