= Pierus (eponym of Pieria) =

King of Emathia in Greek mythology

In Greek mythology, Pierus (Ancient Greek: Πίερος, romanized: Píeros, lit. 'from Pieria') was the king of Emathia in Macedonia. He was the eponym of Pieria and Mt. Pierus. Pierus was credited to be the first to write in the praise of the Muses.

== Family ==
According to Marsyas of Pella (c. 330 BC), Pierus was the son of Makednos by a local woman and brother of Amathus (Emathus), eponym of Emathia but Solinus (9.10) contradicts this idea because according to him Pierus was unrelated and older than Makednos.

In the Suda, he was described as a son of Linus, the son of Thracian Aethusa and in turn Pierus was the father of Oeagrus making him the grandfather of the musician Orpheus. His wife was known to be Methone, a nymph while others called her Pierus' sister. In the account of Antoninus Liberalis, Pierus sprung from the soil (an autochthon).

Most of the myths recounted Pierus to have fathered the Pierides by Antiope, nymph of Pieria or Euippe of Paionia. An unnamed daughter of Pierus was said to be the mother of Orpheus, not the Muse Calliope as what the Greeks believed according to Pausanias.

Comparative table of Pierus' family
Relation	Name	Sources							
Relation	Name	Homer	Marsyas	Cicero	Ovid	Pausanias	Antoninus	Suda	Tzetzes
Parentage	Linus	✓						✓	
Parentage	Macednos		✓						
Parentage	autochthon						✓		
Wife	Methone	✓							
Wife	Antiopa			✓					
Wife	Euippe				✓				
Sibling	Amathus		✓						
Sibling	Methone								✓
Children	Oeagrus	✓						✓	
Children	Pierides			✓	✓		✓		
Children	mother of Orpheus					✓			
Children	Linus								✓

== Mythology ==
Pierus was famous for his daughters, the Emathides (Ἠμαθίδες), nine maidens whom he named after the nine Muses. These girls, believing that their skills were a great match to the Muses, afterwards entered into a contest with the Muses. Being conquered, they were transformed into birds called Colymbas, Iyngx, Cenchris, Cissa, Chloris, Acalanthis, Nessa, Pipo and Dracontis.

In the account of Pausanias, Pierus has emigrated from Thrace into Boeotia and established the worship of the Muses at Thespiae.

== See also ==
- Pieres – a Thracian tribe
