= Ialemus =

Ialémos (Ancient Greek: Ἰάλεμος, meaning "funeral song"), is a song of lamentation in ancient Greece, a minor deity personifying this song in Greek mythology, and an epithet of Linus. He was the son of Apollo and Calliope, and the inventor of the song Ialemus (ἰάλεμος), which was a kind of dirge, or at any rate a song of a very serious and mournful character, and is only mentioned as sung on most melancholy occasions. (Aeschyl. Suppl. 106; Eurip, Herc. Fur. 109, SuppL 283.) In later times, this kind of poetry lost its popularity, and was ridiculed by the comic poets. Lalemus then became synonymous with cold and frosty poetry, and was used in this sense proverbially. (Schol. ad Eurip. Orest. 1375, ad Apollon. Rhod. iv. 1304; Zenob. iv. 39.)

In his third Threnos, Pindar associates him with Hymen, Linos and Orpheus, and makes him the son of Apollo and Calliope. The ialémos then appears as a poetic genre in itself, and is quoted several times by the tragic ones in scenes of lamentations. Pamphos associates him with Linos, son of Urania.

During the Classical period, the genre gradually lost its popularity. The name ialémos then becomes proverbial for what inspires pity (Ἰαλέμου) ψυχρότερος / (Ialémou) psykhóteros meaning cold, or in the expression "more naked than Ialémos" (Γυμνότερος Ἰαλέμου Ἰαλέμου / Gymnóteros).
