= Thamyris =

Mythical poet/musician

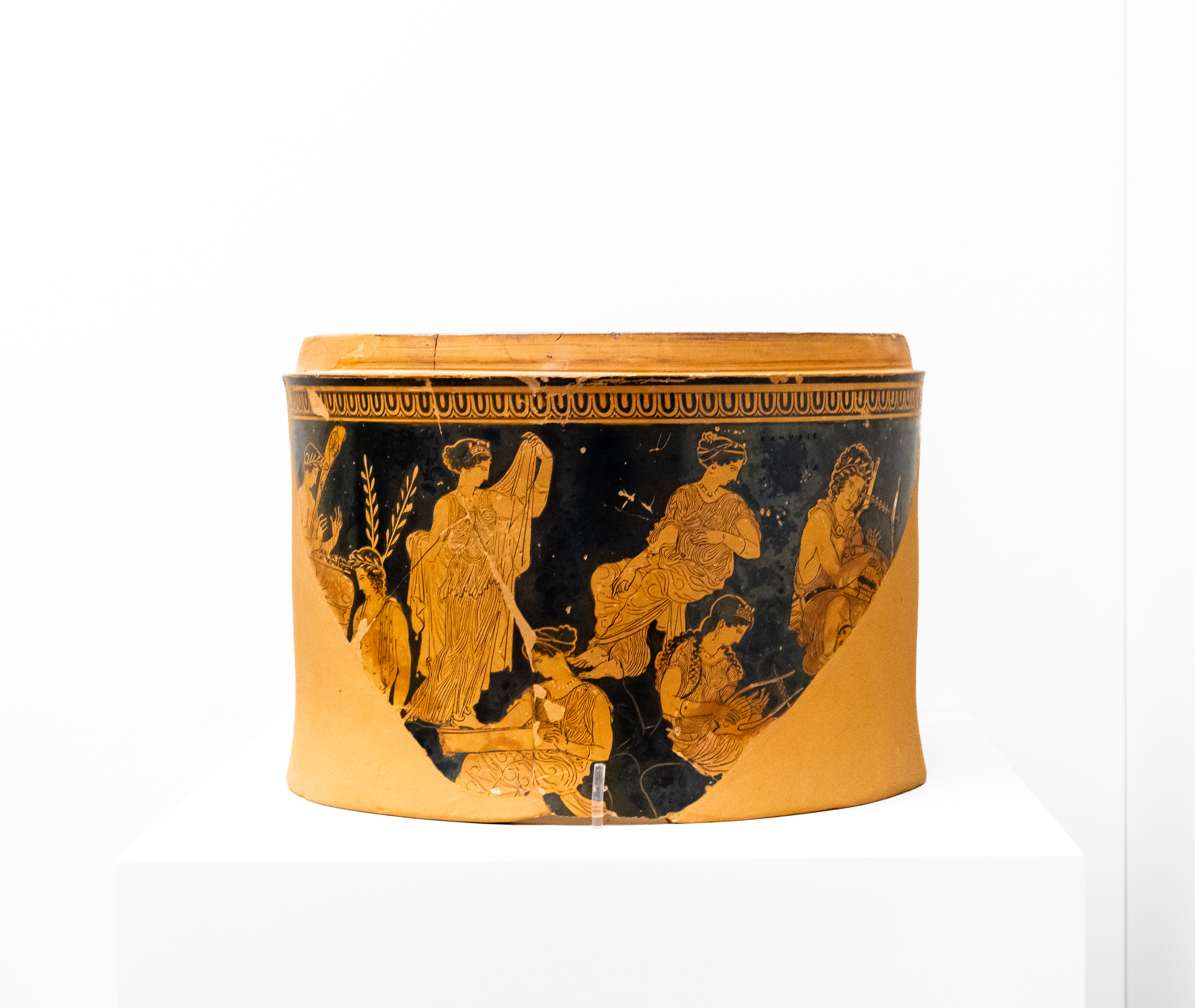
Thamyris (far right) playing the lyre in the presence of the Muses, Apollo and Musaeus on an Attic red-figure pyxis c. 410 BC, now kept in the National Archaeological Museum of Greece.

In Greek mythology, Thamyris (Ancient Greek: Θάμυρις, Thámuris) was a Thracian singer. He is notable in Greek mythology for reportedly having been in love with Hyacinth before the latter's relationship with Apollo and having been the first mortal male to have loved another male. He was later punished by the Muses when he challenged them to a musical competition.

== Family ==
Thamyris was the son of Philammon and the nymph Argiope from Mount Parnassus. One account makes him the father of Menippe, who became the mother of Orpheus by Oeagrus.

== Mythology ==
=== Early years ===
When Philammon refused to take Argiope into his house as his wife, the girl left Peloponnese and went to the country of the Odrysians in Thrace where she gave birth to a son, Thamyris. When the boy reached puberty, he became so accomplished in singing to the cithara that the Scythians made him their king even though he was an interloper.

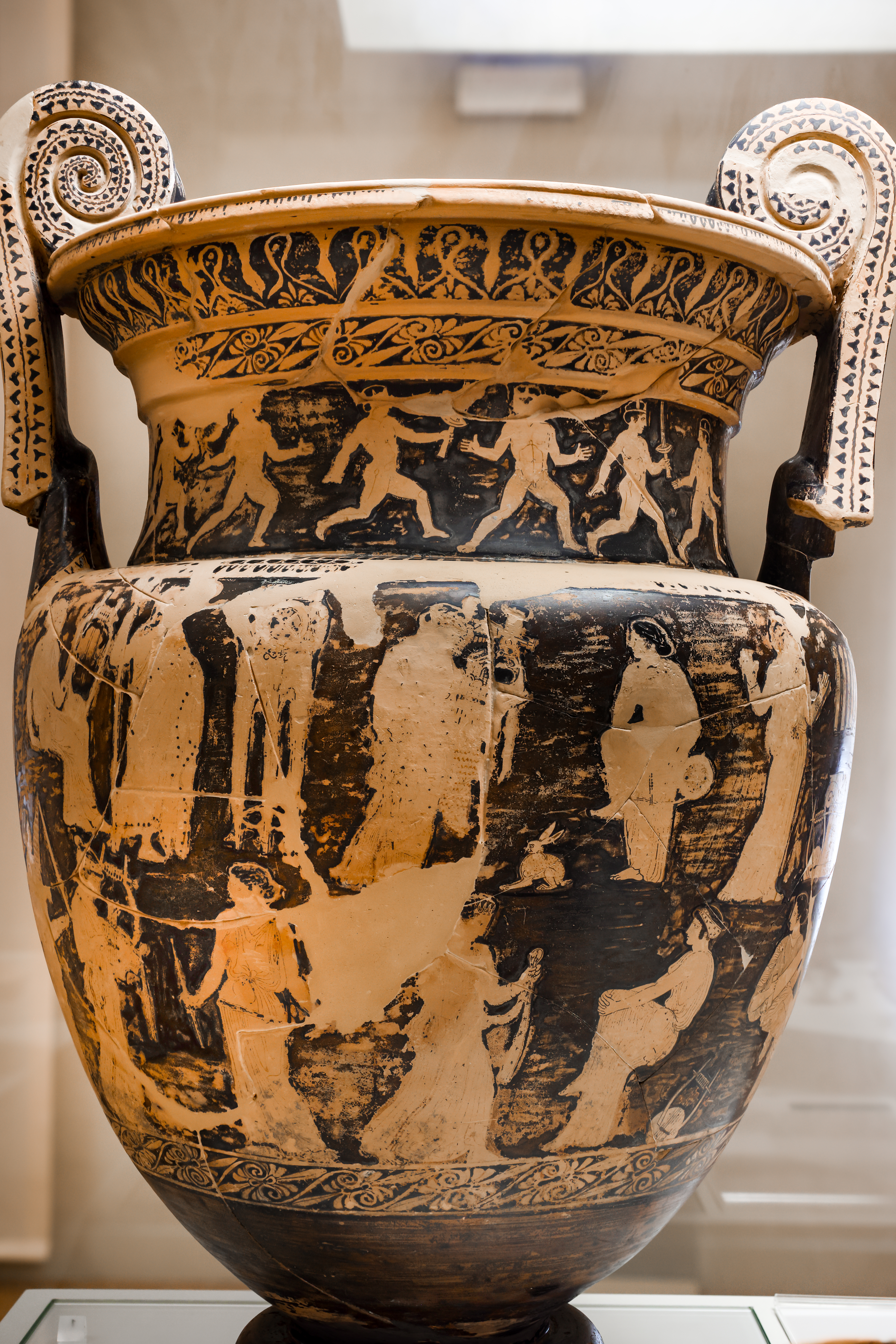
Thamyris playing the kithara in the center of an Attic red-figure volute krater from 420s BC, National Archaeological Museum of Ferrara in Italy.

According to Diodorus the mythical singer Linus took three pupils: Heracles, Thamyris, and Orpheus, which neatly settles Thamyris' legendary chronology. When Pliny the Elder briefly sketches the origins of music, he credits Thamyris with inventing the Dorian mode and with being the first to play the cithara as a solo instrument with no vocal accompaniment.

Thamyris is said to have been enamored of Hyacinth, and thus to have been the first man to have loved another male.

=== Contest with Muses ===
While returning from Oechalia, Thamyris paused at the ford of the river Alpheus and boasted that he could surpass the Muses – the daughters of Zeus – in singing. But they were angry and stilled his singing forever, robbing him of the divine powers of song and playing the lyre anymore. The story is mentioned briefly in the Iliad. According to Apollodorus in the Library, the Muses instead punished him by gouging out his eyes.

This allusion is taken up in Euripides' Rhesus, and in the scholia on the Iliad. These later sources add the details that Thamyris had demanded as his prize for winning the contest either the privilege of having sex with all the Muses or of marrying one of them; and that after his death he was further punished in Hades according to the lost epic Minyad. In the great painting of the Underworld by Polygnotus at Delphi, Thamyris was depicted sitting near Pelias. He was blind and had an expression of complete dejection, his hair and beard were long and a broken lyre with damaged horns and strings lies discarded at his feet. Ancient scholia emphasized that the episode was meant to illustrate that poetic inspiration was a gift of the gods, and could be taken away by them.

Pausanias himself speculates that Thamyris lost his eyesight due to disease in a similar way to Homer and draws a comparsion between the two by stating that Homer choose to keep making poetry while Thamyris abandoned his art.

== Other ==
Thamyris is also the name of a Theban who was killed by Actor.

== Legacy ==
Thamyris Glacier on Anvers Island in Antarctica is named after Thamyris.
