= Eleutherae =

City in the northern part of Attica

- Ἐλευθεραί (Ancient Greek)
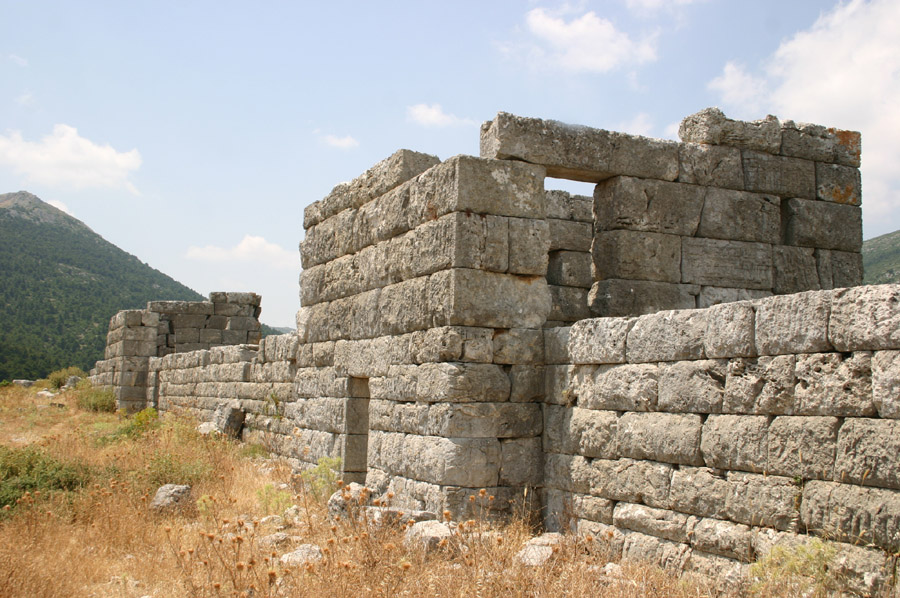
- Wall of the ancient fortress of Eleutherae, seen from inside of the castle

- Location within Greece
- 38°10′46″N 23°22′33″E
- Type: Settlement
- Periods: Classical Greek to Hellenistic
- Satellite of: Athens
- Associated with: Myron
- Location: Oinoi, Attica, Greece
- Region: Attica

Site notes
- Length: 113 m (371 ft)
- Width: 290 m (950 ft)
- Area: 3.3 ha (8.2 acres)
- Condition: Ruined
- Owner: Public
- Management: 3rd Ephorate of Prehistoric and Classical Antiquities
- Public access: Yes
- Website: Hellenic Ministry of Culture and Tourism

Eleutherae (/ɪˈljuθəri/; Ancient Greek: Ἐλευθεραί) is a city in the northern part of Attica, bordering the territory of Boeotia. One of the best preserved fortresses of Ancient Greece stands now on the spot of an Ancient Eleutherae castle, dated between 370 and 360 BC, with walls of very fine masonry that average 2.6m thick. A circuit of wall 860 m contained towers, 6 of them still standing along the northern edge of the site, preserved to the height of 4 to 6 m. The foundations of more towers are present. Although not as well preserved, the line of the remainder of the fortification circuit is clear, as is the location of the one large, double gate (western) and one small (south-eastern) gate. There are two small sally-ports located on the north side. The fortified area is irregular and c. 113 by 290m in extent.

== History ==
Eleuther, in mythology, son of Apollo and Aethusa, was regarded as the founder of Eleutherae. The feast of the Dionysia is believed to have been established throughout Greece when Eleutherae chose to become part of Attica and presented a statue of the god Dionysus to Athens. It was rejected by the Athenians, and, soon after, Athens was hit with a plague. Out of fear for Dionysus, the Athenians celebrated the Dionysia by running a procession of people carrying phalloi, and saved the city from further destruction. In the 2nd century CE, the periegetic writer Pausanias wrote:

When you have turned from Eleusis to Boeotia, you come to the Plataean land, which borders on Attica. Formerly Eleutherae formed the boundary (of Boeotia) on the side towards Attica, but when it came over to the Athenians henceforth the boundary of Boeotia was Mount Cithaeron. The reason why the people of Eleutherae came over was not because they were reduced by war, but because they desired to share Athenian citizenship and hated the Thebans. In this plain is a temple of Dionysus, from which the old wooden image was carried off to Athens. The image at Eleutherae at the present day is a copy of the old one. (Description of Greece 1.38.8)

Indeed, Eleutherae, like neighboring Plataea, was an independent polis on the border between Attica and Boeotia. Frustrated by the perennial belligerence and bullying of the Thebans, the Eleuthereans turned to Athens and volunteered to give up their independence in exchange for incorporation into the Athenian polis. Given the geopolitical significance of the town, the Athenians eventually acquiesced and the cult of Diónysos Eleuthereús ("Dionysus the Liberator") was symbolically transferred to Athens. The feast of the Dionýsia, originally an Eleutherean festival in celebration of the new wine, was the event that led to the creation of what was then a completely new literary and artistic genre: the theatre; consequently, at the Theatre of Dionysus, the priest of Dionysus Eleuthereus was the principal honoree and his ornate marble throne was center-placed in the front row of the spectator seats.

Famous historical figures originate from here, such as Myron, a famous sculptor known primarily for his Discobolus (discus thrower). His son, Lycius, was also a renowned sculptor.

Since the modern times the fortress is also referred to as "Gyftokastro" ("Gypsy Castle").
