= Amphimarus =

In Greek mythology, Amphimarus (Ancient Greek: Ἀμφίμαρος) was the son of Poseidon and the father of the musician Linus, whose mother was the Muse Urania. According to this account, Linus was killed by Apollo for rivaling him in singing. Notably, in this version of the myth, Linus was not identified as the son of a god.
