= Aethusa =

Ancient Greek mythological figure

In Greek mythology, Aethusa (Ancient Greek: Αἵθουσα) was a daughter of Poseidon and the Pleiad Alcyone, daughter of Atlas. She was loved by Apollo and bore to him Eleuther and Linus. Through either of the latter two, Aethusa became the grandmother of Pierus, father of Oeagrus, father of the musician Orpheus. Because of this genealogical fact, she was usually identified as a Thracian.

The word aethusa was used as an epithet for a portico that was open to the sun above.

According to Pliny's Naturalis Historia, Aethusa is also the eponym of the Italian island which is now called Linosa.
