= Bakis =

Multiple ancient Greek seers

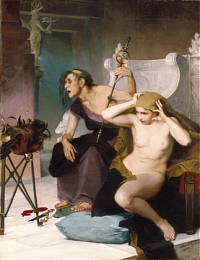
The Bacidae 1883 by Sarah Paxton Ball Dodson (two soothsayers, called Bacidae, in a prophetic ecstasy reading chicken entrails).

Bakis (also Bacis; Ancient Greek: Βάκις) is a general name for the inspired prophets and dispensers of oracles who flourished in Greece from the 8th to the 6th century B.C. Philetas of Ephesus, Aelian and John Tzetzes distinguish between three: a Boeotian, an Arcadian and an Athenian.

== The Boeotian ==
The first Bakis, a native of Eleon in Boeotia, who was the most famous, was said to have been inspired by the nymphs of the Corycian Cave. His oracles, of which specimens are extant in Herodotus and Pausanias, were written in hexameter verse, and were considered to have been strikingly fulfilled. Apocryphal oracular pronouncements in dactylic hexameters circulated under his name during times of stress, such as the Persian and Peloponnesian Wars.

== The Arcadian ==
The Arcadian Bakis was believed to have originated from Caphyae and to have also been known as Aletes or Cydas. He was said to have cured the women of Sparta of a fit of madness. Many of the oracles which were current under his name have been attributed to Onomacritus.

== The Athenian ==
Extant sources provide no information on this Bakis. However, according to Suda, Bakis was also an epithet of Peisistratus. From this one may conclude that oracular poetry was popular at the times of Peisistratus, and that he himself wrote poetry of this kind.

== Evolution of the term "Bakis" ==
According to Erwin Rohde, "Bakis" was a title originally applied to any one of a class of ecstatic seers, but later came to be thought of as the proper name of an individual. There was also a verb βακίζω "to prophesy", secondarily derived from the name Bakis (similar to the case of σιβυλλίζω : Σίβυλλα "Sibyl").
