= Oeagrus =

Mythical character, father of Orpheus

In Greek mythology, Oeagrus (Ancient Greek: Οἴαγρος, romanized: Oíagros, lit. 'of the wild sorb-apple') was a king of Thrace, and father of Orpheus.

== Biography ==
=== Kingdom ===
There are various versions as to where Oeagrus' domain was actually situated. In one version, he ruled over the Edonian kingdom in the region of Mygdonia. He is also connected with Pieria, further west, or to the vicinity of the River Hebrus to the east, the latter was said to be called 'Oeagria', in his honor.

=== Family ===
In the version that places Oeagrus in Pieria, his father is given as King Pierus and his mother as the nymph Methone. He was described as "a Thracian wine-god, who was himself descended from Atlas." According to Suda, Oiagros was in the fifth generation after Atlas, by Alkyone, one of his daughters. This can be explained by the following genealogy: (1) Atlas by Pleione — (2) Alcyone by Poseidon — (3) Aethusa by Apollo — (4) Linus or Eleuther — (5) Pierus by Methone — Oeager. This was supported by the order of genealogy according to the historian Charax which as follows: Aethuse the Thracian was the mother of Linus, the father of Pierus, the father of Oeagrus.

In the account that places him in Edonia he is said to be the son of Charops, an adherent of the god Dionysus; Charops was invited by Dionysus to rule over the Edones after the violent death of their king Lycurgus. Oeagrus has also sometimes been called the son of the god Ares, who was associated with Thrace.

Oeagrus and the Muse Calliope or Clio or Polymnia were the parents of Orpheus and Linus. He married Calliope close to Pimpleia, Olympus. The sisters of Orpheus are called Oeagrides, in the sense of the Muses. The father of Orpheus was sometimes given as Apollo. Oeagrus was also mentioned as the father of Marsyas.

Comparative table of Oeagrus' family and possible kingdom
Variable	Name	Sources																			
Variable	Name	Homer	Apollon.		Mos.	Dio.	Con.	Ovid	Arrian	Apol.	Hyginus			Athen.	Orp.	Non.	Gk.	Suda	Tzet.	1st	2nd
Variable	Name	Contest	Arg.	Sch.	Mos.	Dio.	Con.	Ibis	Arrian	Apol.	Fab.		Ast.	Athen.	Arg.	Non.	Ant.	Suda	Lyco.	V.M.	V.M
Oeagrus' Kingdom	(Pimpleia,) Pieria		✓													✓		✓			
Oeagrus' Kingdom	Bistonia																✓				
Oeagrus' Kingdom	Thrace							✓													
Orpheus' Kingdom	Pieria								✓		✓		✓								
Orpheus' Kingdom	Edonia												✓								
Orpheus' Kingdom	Macedonia						✓														
Orpheus' Kingdom	Odrysia						✓											✓			
Orpheus' Kingdom	Thrace					✓		✓						✓							
Orpheus' Kingdom	Bistonia (Cicones)		✓		✓										✓			✓			
Orpheus' Kingdom	Leibithra																	✓			
Parentage	Charops					✓															
Parentage	Ares															✓					
Parentage	Pierus																	✓			
Parentage	Pierus and Methone	✓																			
Consort	Calliope	✓	✓	✓ or			✓	✓		✓	✓		✓		✓	✓	✓		✓	✓	✓
Consort	Polymnia			✓																	
Children	Orpheus	✓	✓	✓		✓	✓	✓	✓	✓	✓		✓	✓	✓	✓	✓	✓	✓	✓	✓
Children	Linus									✓											
Children	Marsyas											✓									
Children	Oeagrides				✓																

== Mythology ==
In Nonnus' Dionysiaca, the author states that Oeagrus quit his city of Pimpleia on the Bistonian plain and followed the enterprise of Dionysos against the Indian people. He left his newly born son Orpheus in the charge of his consort Calliopeia.

"The bold son of Ares, Oiagros, quitted his city of Pimpleia on the Bistonian plain, and joined the rout. He left Orpheus on Calliopeia's knees, a little one interested in his mother's milk, still a new thing. "

Oeagrus was also described as a singer and harpist, and a skilled warrior during this adventures.

"When Bromios had spoken, up sprang a harper, Oiagros, a man of the cold Bistonian land,' with the quill hanging to his harp."

"Second, my lord Oiagros wove a winding lay, as the father of Orpheus who has the Muse his boon companion. Only a couple of verses he sang, a ditty of Phoibos, clear spoken in few words after some Amyclaian style: Apollo brought to life again his longhaired Hyacinthos: Staphylos will be made to live for aye by Dionysos."

"The Lord crowned Oiagros's head with ivy, and the father of Orpheus stamped his foot on the ground, as he accepted with joy the untamed bull, the prize of the singing, while his companions danced round him in a row."

"Oiagros also beat back the swarthy fighting, insatiable, reaping the ranks of men in swathes, as he cut the harvest of flashing helms with Bistonian blade."

"He (i.e. Oiagros) bent his bow, fitted a shaft to the string, and drew it right back to the tip of the iron and let fly at the mark, trusting all hopes of victory to his bride Calliopeia, mother of a noble son. Nine longbarbed arrows he shot, nine men he slew — one number for the arrows let fly and the warriors killed. One flying shaft pierced a forehead, one cut the round of a hairy breast, another fell on a flank, another upon a belly and dug deep into the hollow middle. Again one went through a side, another caught a running man on the sole of his storming foot and nailed the foot close fastened to the earth. Again he drew back a windswift shaft: and from that quiver another flew, and a shower of arrows went one after another hurtling through the air. As when a man hammers metal on a smith's anvil, and rings the fiery clinks with unwearied sledge beating the mass below, the sparks leap out in showers, spurting when the iron is struck, and heat the air; under blow after blow first one goes up then another, one leaps after another and catches it leaping in its fiery course: so he shooting at the Indian host before him scattered the warriors with arrows without respite, slaying on all sides with the incessant shafts. The centre of the line gave way before this cloud of arrows and a space was left clear, like the crescent moon when it shines dim at either horn and fills the two ends with new-lighted sheen, marking off the middle of the orb with receding beams, and the two horns apart gleaming softly, but the middle orb of the moon marked off is yet seen to be bare.

== Honours ==
Oeagrus Beach in Antarctica is named after the mythical king.

== Sources ==
- Kathleen Freeman. The Pre-Socratic Philosophers. Oxford: Basil Blackwell, 1946.
