= Pamphos =

Pamphos Ancient Greek Πάμφως (Pamphos) is an Athenian poet, allegedly a contemporary of Linus of Thrace, inventor of the ialémos. Two purported short fragments of his poems survive.

== History ==
An Athenian poet with sad and melancholy verses, asserted by Pausanias to be the Athenians' oldest hymn-poet, and first to sing an iaemos on the tomb of Linus. Previous to Homer, he had written a poem about Eros, about the Charites, without mentioning their number or their names, and Zeus after Philostratus and several hymns, including one to Demeter; he was one of the first to sing the kidnapping of Persephone, in which he speaks of her playing among narcissus flowers (many years before the legendary Narcissus), and describes the journeys of Demeter that followed.
