= Musaeus of Athens =

Legendary ancient poet and musician

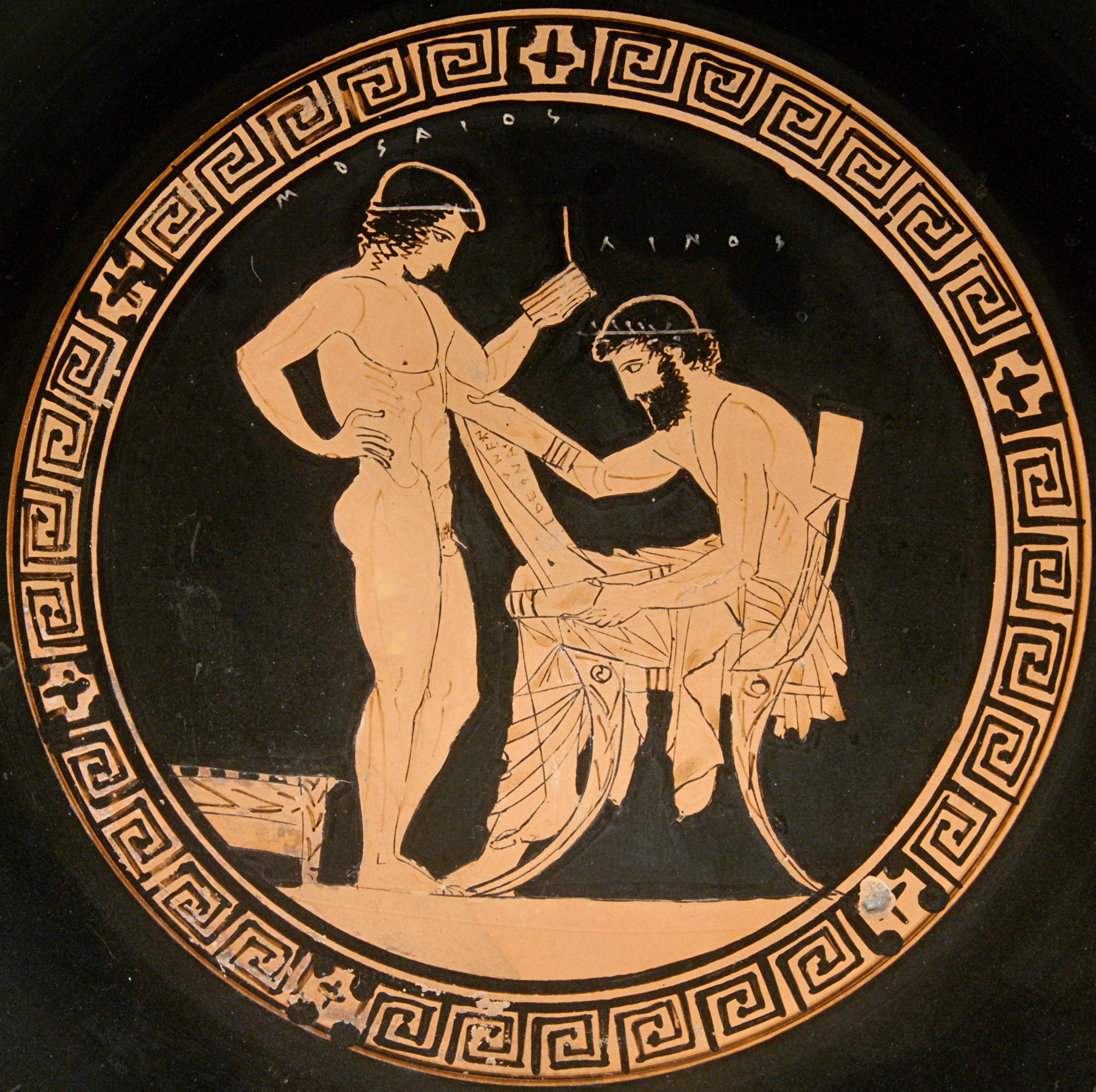
Linus teaches the letters to Musaeus on the tondo of a kylix. Eretria Painter, circa 440/35 BC. Paris, Louvre.

Musaeus of Athens (Greek: Μουσαῖος, Mousaios) was a legendary Greek polymath, philosopher, historian, prophet, seer, priest, poet, and musician, said to have been the founder of priestly poetry in Attica. He composed dedicatory and purificatory hymns and prose treatises, and oracular responses.

== Life ==
A semimythological personage, to be classed with Olen, Orpheus, and Pamphus. He was regarded as the author of various poetical compositions, especially as connected with the mystic rites of Demeter at Eleusis, over which the legend represented him as presiding in the time of Heracles.

He was reputed to belong to the family of the Eumolpidae, being the son of Eumolpus and Selene. In other variations of the myth he was less definitely called a Thracian. According to Diodorus Siculus, Musaeus was the son of Orpheus, and according to Tatian he was the disciple of Orpheus. Others made him the son of Antiphemus, or Antiophemus, and Helena. Alexander Polyhistor, Clement of Alexandria and Eusebius say he was the teacher of Orpheus.

In a work attributed to Aristotle a wife Deioce is given him; while in the elegiac poem of Hermesianax, quoted by Athenaeus (xiii. p. 597), Antiope is mentioned as his wife or mistress. The Suda describes him as having a son, Eumolpus. The scholiast on Aristophanes mentions an inscription said to have been placed on the tomb of Musaeus at Phalerus. According to Diogenes Laërtius he died and was buried at Phalerum, with the epitaph: "Musaeus, to his sire Eumolpus dear, in Phalerean soil lies buried here." According to Pausanias, he was buried on the Mouseion Hill, south-west of the Acropolis, where there was a statue dedicated to a Syrian.

== Attributed works ==
Herodotus reports that, during the reign of Peisistratus at Athens, the scholar Onomacritus collected and arranged the oracles of Musaeus but inserted forgeries of his own devising, later detected by Lasus of Hermione. The mystic and oracular verses and customs of Attica, especially of Eleusis, are connected with his name. A Titanomachia and Theogonia are also attributed to him by Gottfried Kinkel.

We find the following poetical compositions, accounted as his among the ancients:

- Oracles (Χρησμοί) – Onomacritus, in the time of the Peisistratidae, made it his business to collect and arrange the oracles that passed under the name of Musaeus, and was banished by Hipparchus for interpolating in the collection oracles of his own making
- Precepts (Ὑποθῆκαιa) addressed to his son Eumolpus, and extending to the length of 4000 lines
- A hymn to Demeter – this composition is set down by Pausanias as the only genuine production of Musaeus extant in his day
- Cures for Diseases (Ἐξακέσεις νόσων)
- Eumolpía. This work was probably a theogony, and was likely the same as the Theogonía (Θεογονία) of Musaeus mentioned by Diogenes Laertius.
- Titanomachia (Τιτανογραφία) – on the Titanomachy, a battle between the Olympian gods and the Titans
- Sphaera (Σφαῖρα) – perhaps an astronomical poem
- Paralysis (Παραλύσεις), Initiations (Τελεταὶ), or Purifications (Καθαρμοί) – a type of poem referring to religious initiation rituals

Aristotle also quotes some verses of Musaeus in Book VIII of his Politics: "Song is to mortals of all things the sweetest." but without specifying from what work or collection.

William Smith noted a theory that the Musaeus who is named as the author of the Theogony and Sphaera was a different person from the legendary bard of the same name, but he suggests that there is not any evidence to support that view. The poem on the loves of Hero and Leander is by a very much later author, known as Musaeus Grammaticus.

== Legacy ==
- The playwright Euripides in his play Rhesus describes him thus: "Musaeus, too, thy holy citizen, of all men most advanced in lore."
- Plato says in his Ion that poets are inspired by Orpheus and Musaeus but the greater are inspired by Homer.
- In the Protagoras, Plato says that Musaeus was a hierophant and a prophet.
- In the Apology, Socrates says: "What would not a man give if he might converse with Orpheus and Musaeus and Hesiod and Homer? Nay, if this be true, let me die again and again."
- Artapanus of Alexandria, Alexander Polyhistor, Numenius of Apamea, and Eusebius identify Musaeus with Moses, the Jewish lawbringer.
