= Lycius (sculptor) =

Ancient Greek sculptor

Lycius (Greek: Λύκιος) was an ancient Greek sculptor active in the middle decades of the 5th century BCE. Ancient sources identify him as son of Myron of Eleutherae. He sculpted bronze horses and humans for a cavalry monument dedicated on the Acropolis of Athens. He also did architecture on the Athenian Acropolis (Inscriptiones Graecae I³, 2, no. 511, 446 BCE?).
