= Lasus of Hermione =

6th-century BC Greek lyric poet

Lasus of Hermione (Greek: Λάσος ὁ Ἑρμιονεύς) was a Greek lyric poet of the 6th century BC from the city of Hermione in the Argolid. He is known to have been active at Athens under the reign of the Peisistratids. Pseudo-Plutarch's De Musica credits him with innovations in the dithyramb hymn.

With the aid of various changes in music and rhythm, he developed the dithyramb form into an artistically constructed choral song, with an accompaniment of several flutes. It became more artificial and mimetic in character, and its range of subjects was no longer confined to the adventures of Dionysus. Lasus further increased its popularity by introducing prize contests for the best poem of the kind.

He avoided the letter sigma (on account of its hissing sound) in several of his poems, of one of which (a hymn to Demeter of Hermione) a few lines have been preserved in Athenaeus (xiv. 624 E).

According to Herodotus, Lasus also exposed Onomacritus's forgeries of the oracles of Musaeus. Lasus is recorded to have written a now lost treatise on music, of which very little is known.

== Sources ==
- Battezzato, Luigi (2021). "Sappho's Metres and Music". In Finglass, P. J.; Kelly, Adrian (eds.). The Cambridge Companion to Sappho. Cambridge: Cambridge University Press. ISBN 978-1-316-63877-4.
