= Eleuther =

Multiple Greek mythological figures

In Greek mythology, the name Eleuther (Ancient Greek: Ἐλευθήρ) may refer to:

- Eleuther, one of the Curetes, was said to have been the eponym of the towns Eleutherae and Eleuthernae in Crete.
- Eleuther, an Arcadian prince as one of the 50 sons of the impious King Lycaon either by the naiad Cyllene, Nonacris or by unknown woman. He and his brother Lebadus were the only not guilty of the abomination prepared for Zeus, and fled to Boeotia.
- Eleuther, a variant of the name Eleutherios, early Greek god who was the son of Zeus and probably an alternate name of Dionysus.
- Eleuther, son of Apollo and Aethusa. He is renowned for having an excellent singing voice, which earned him a victory at the Pythian games, and for having been the first to erect a statue of Dionysus, as well as for having given his name to Eleutherae. His sons were Iasius (Iasion) and Pierus. He also had several daughters, who spoke impiously of the image of Dionysus wearing a black aegis, and were driven mad by the god; as a remedy, Eleuther, in accordance with an oracle, established a cult of "Dionysus of the Black Aegis".

== See also ==
- Eleutheria, Greek term for liberty
