= Urania =

Muse of astronomy in Greek mythology

- Goddess of Astronomy
- Member of the Muses
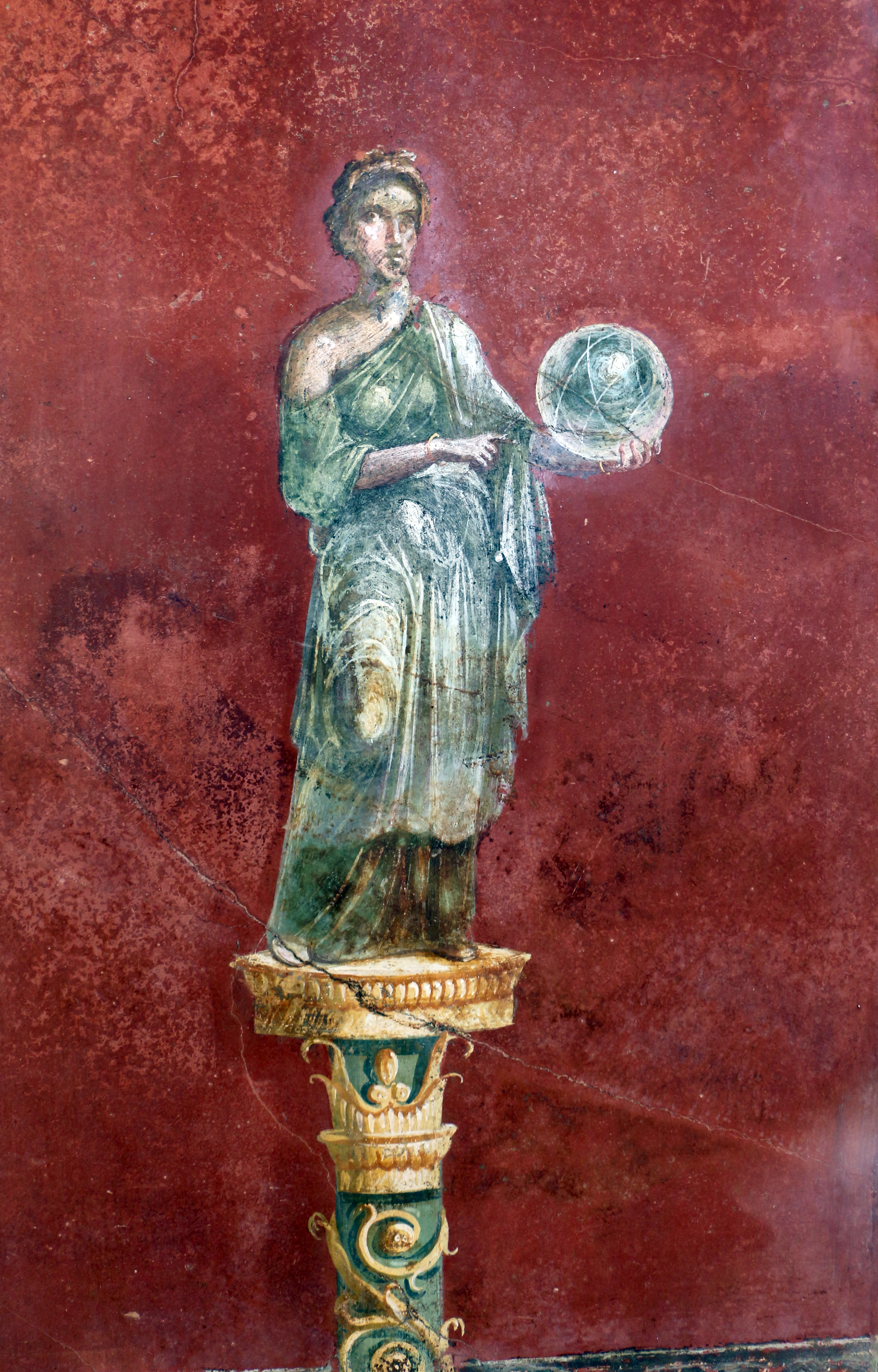
- Urania on an antique fresco from Pompeii
- Abode: Mount Olympus
- Symbols: Globe

Genealogy
- Parents: Zeus and Mnemosyne
- Siblings: Euterpe, Polyhymnia, Calliope, Clio, Erato, Thalia, Terpsichore, Melpomene and several paternal half-siblings
- Children: Linus, Hymen

Urania (/jʊəˈreɪniə/ yoor-AY-nee-ə; Ancient Greek: Οὐρανία, romanized: Ouranía; meaning "heavenly" or "of heaven") was, in Greek mythology, the muse of astronomy and astrology. In ancient art, her attributes include the globe and the pointer.

The muse Urania is sometimes confused with Aphrodite Urania ("heavenly Aphrodite") because of their similar name.

== Family ==
Urania was the daughter of Zeus by Mnemosyne and also a great-granddaughter of Uranus. Some accounts list her as the mother of the musician Linus by Apollo or Hermes or Amphimarus, son of Poseidon. Hymenaeus is also said to have been a son of Urania.

== Function and representation ==
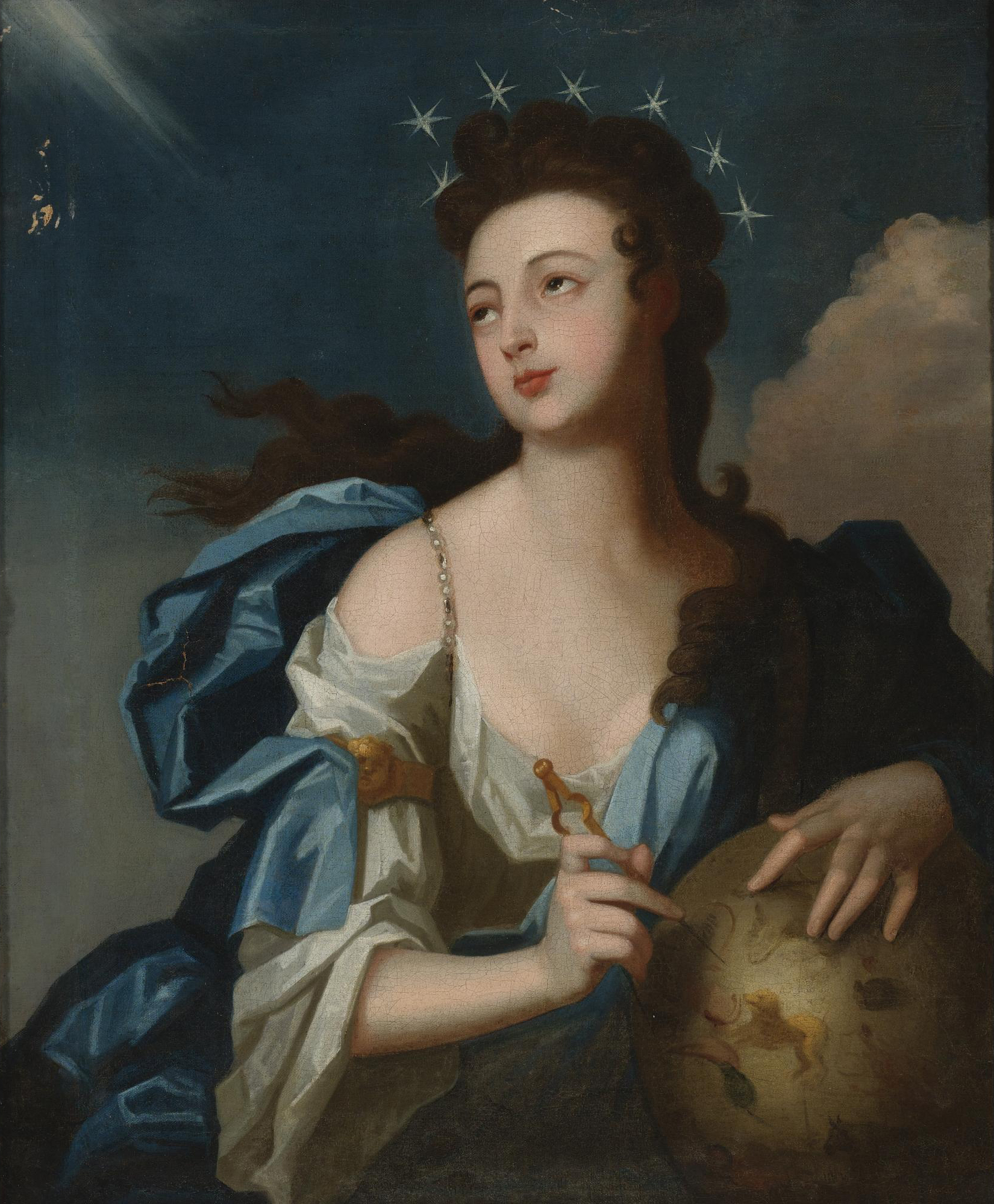
Urania depicted with a celestial globe with stars above her head. Allegorical Portrait of Urania, Muse of Astronomy by Louis Tocqué.

Urania is often associated with Universal Love. Sometimes identified as the eldest of the divine sisters, Urania inherited Zeus' majesty and power and the beauty and grace of her mother Mnemosyne.

Urania dresses in a cloak embroidered with stars and keeps her eyes and attention focused on the Heavens. She is usually represented with a celestial globe to which she points with a little staff, and depicted in modern art with stars above her head. She is able to foretell the future by the arrangement of the stars.

== Urania as Muse ==
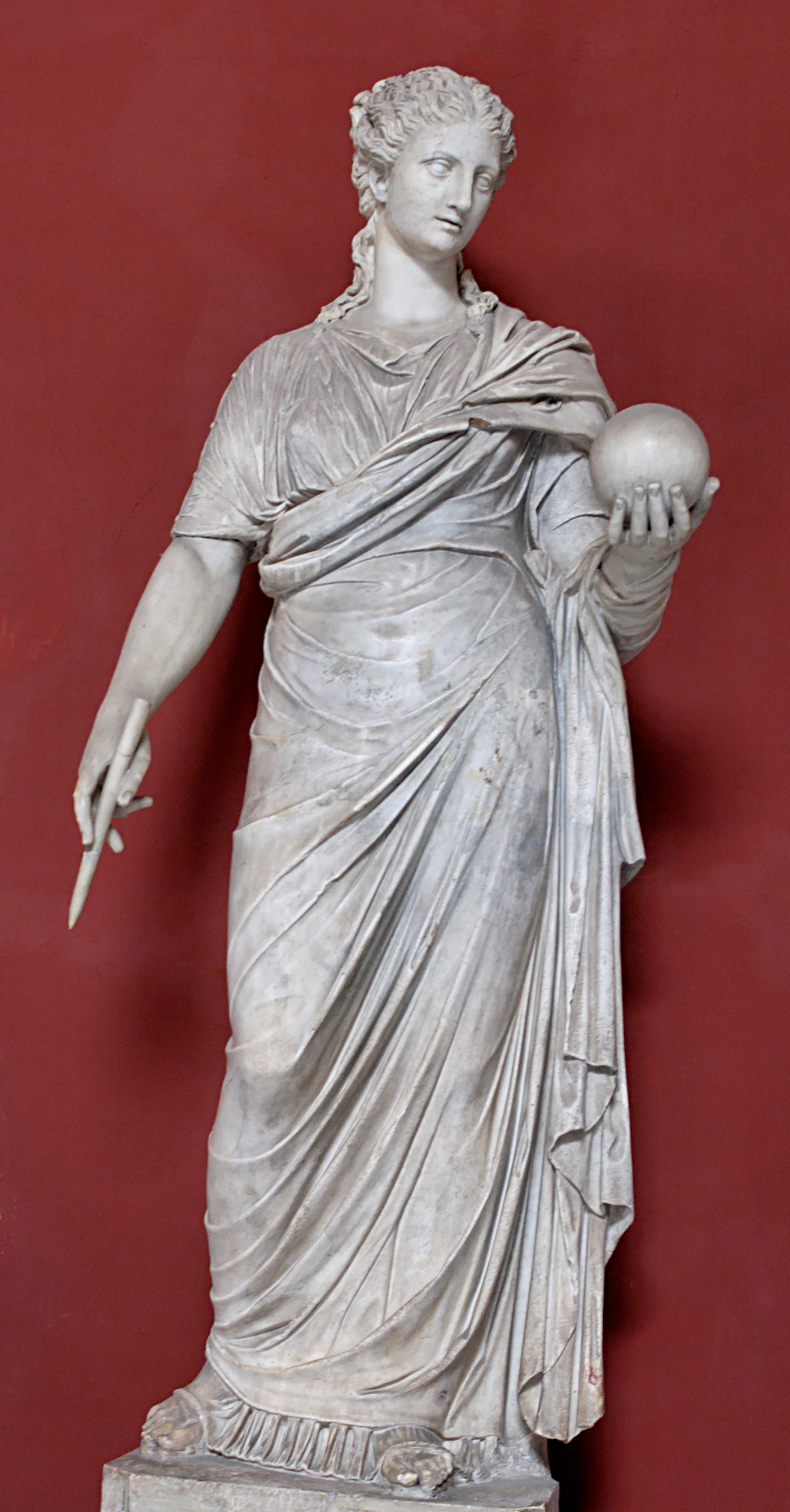
Urania, a restored Roman copy after a Greek original of the 4th century BC, Hadrian's Villa.

Diodorus states that she is named Urania (heavenly) "...because men who have been instructed of her she raises aloft to heaven (ouranos), for it is a fact that imagination and the power of thought lift men’s souls to heavenly heights."

Urania, o'er her star-bespangled lyre,
With touch of majesty diffused her soul;
A thousand tones, that in the breast inspire,
Exalted feelings, o er the wires'gan roll—
How at the call of Jove the mist unfurled,
And o'er the swelling vault—the glowing sky,
The new-born stars hung out their lamps on high,
And rolled their mighty orbs to music's sweetest sound.

—From An Ode to Music by James G. Percival

During the Renaissance, Urania began to be considered the Muse for Christian poets. In the invocation to Book 7 of John Milton's epic poem Paradise Lost, the poet invokes Urania to aid his narration of the creation of the cosmos, though he cautions that it is "[t]he meaning, not the name I call" (7.5).

== In popular culture ==
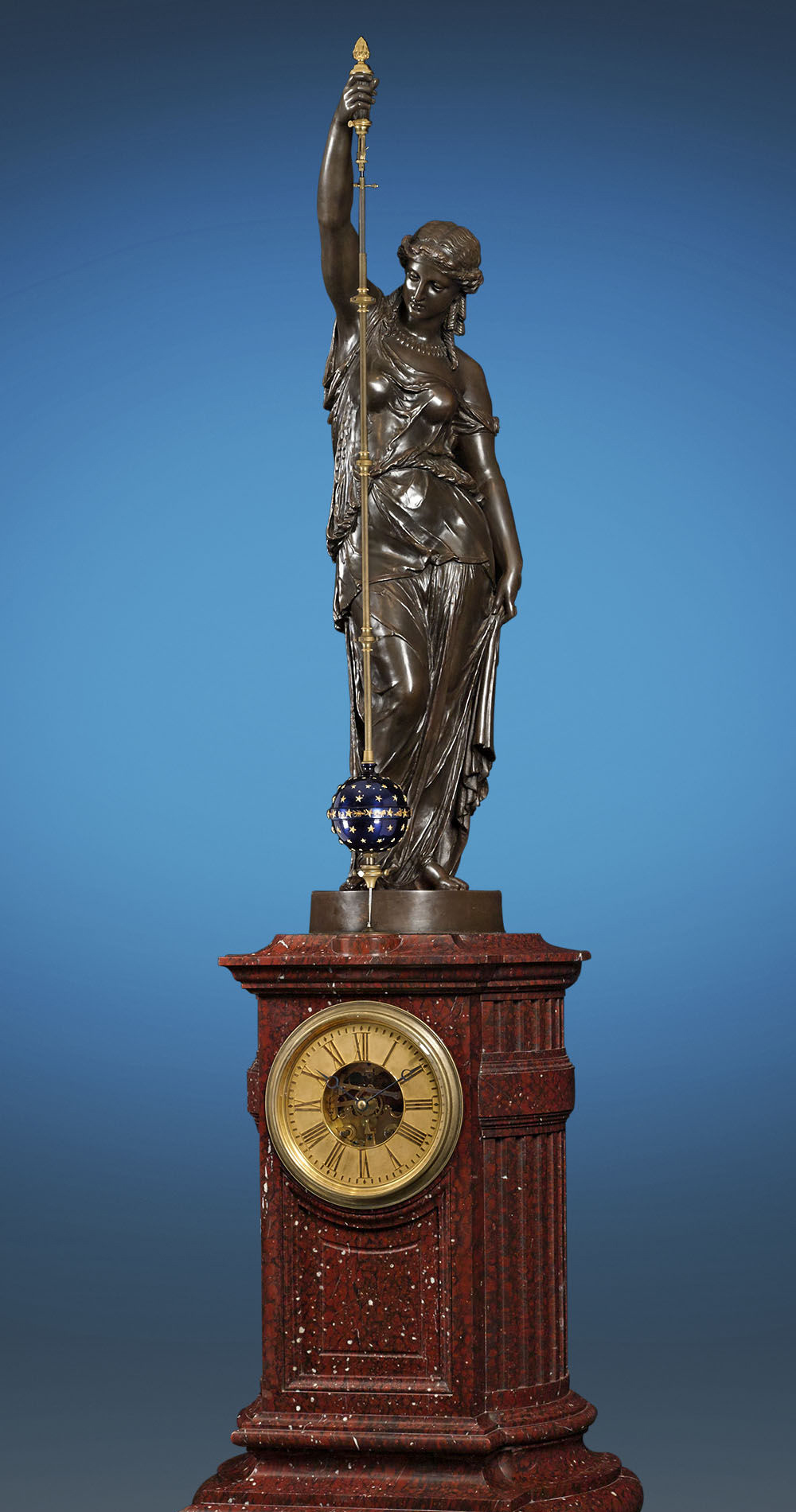
A monumental conical pendulum clock by Eugène Farcot depicting the Greek goddess, 1862.

=== Urania in astronomy and navigation ===
- The planet Uranus, though mostly named after the Greek god personifying the sky, is also indirectly named after Urania.
- Urania is the namesake for astronomical observatories in Berlin, Budapest, Bucharest, Vienna, Zürich, Antwerp, and Uraniborg on the island of Ven. The main belt asteroid (30) Urania was also named after her.
- The official seal of the U.S. Naval Observatory portrays Urania. Hr. Ms. Urania is a sail training vessel for the Royal Netherlands Naval College. There has been a Hr. Ms. Urania in the Royal Netherlands Navy since 1832.
- Urania is featured on the seal of the Royal Astronomical Society of Canada, as well of its motto: Quo ducit Urania ("Where Urania leads").

== See also ==
- Muses in popular culture

== Sources ==
- Diodorus Siculus, Library of History, Volume III: Books 4.59-8, translated by C. H. Oldfather, Loeb Classical Library No. 340, Cambridge, Massachusetts, Harvard University Press, 1939. ISBN 978-0-674-99375-4. Online version at Harvard University Press. Online version by Bill Thayer.
- Hesiod, Theogony, in The Homeric Hymns and Homerica with an English Translation by Hugh G. Evelyn-White, Cambridge, Massachusetts, Harvard University Press; London, William Heinemann Ltd., 1914. Online version at the Perseus Digital Library. Internet Archive.
- Hyginus, Gaius Julius, Fabulae, in The Myths of Hyginus, edited and translated by Mary A. Grant, Lawrence: University of Kansas Press, 1960. Online version at ToposText.
- Ovid, Ovid's Fasti: With an English translation by Sir James George Frazer, London, William Heinemann Ltd.; Cambridge, Massachusetts, Harvard University Press, 1959. Internet Archive.
- Smith, William, Dictionary of Greek and Roman Biography and Mythology, London (1873). Online version at the Perseus Digital Library.
