= Orpheus =

Greek mythological figure

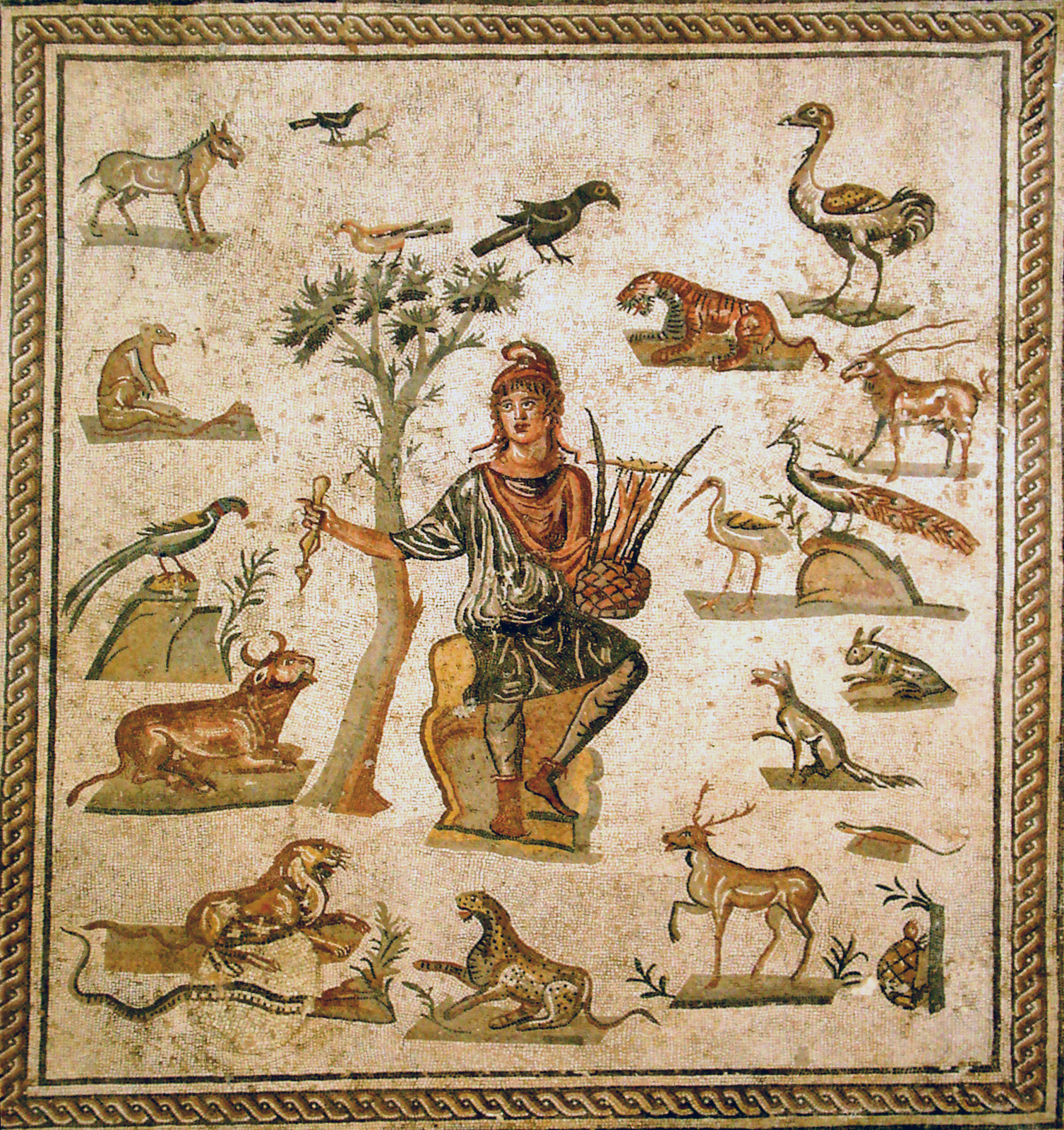
- Orpheus, wearing a Phrygian cap, is surrounded by animals, who are charmed by his lyre-playing. Roman Orpheus mosaic from Palermo, 2nd century AD
- Abode: Pimpleia, Pieria
- Symbol: Lyre

Genealogy
- Born: Pimpleia, Pieria
- Died: Pangaion Hills, Odomantice
- Parents: Oeagrus and Calliope
- Spouse: Eurydice
- Children: Musaeus

In Greek mythology, Orpheus (/ˈɔːrfiːəs, ˈɔːrfjuːs/; Ancient Greek: Ὀρφεύς, classical pronunciation: [or.pʰeú̯s]) was a Thracian bard, legendary musician and prophet. He was also a renowned poet and, according to legend, travelled with Jason and the Argonauts in search of the Golden Fleece, and descended into the underworld to recover his lost wife, Eurydice.

The major stories about him are centered on his ability to charm all living things and even stones with his music (the usual scene in Orpheus mosaics), his attempt to retrieve his wife Eurydice from the underworld, and his death at the hands of the maenads of Dionysus, who got tired of his mourning for his late wife Eurydice. As an archetype of the inspired singer, Orpheus is one of the most significant figures in the reception of classical mythology in Western culture, portrayed or alluded to in countless forms of art and popular culture including poetry, film, opera, music, and painting.

For the Greeks, Orpheus was a founder and prophet of the so-called "Orphic" mysteries. He was credited with the composition of a number of works, among which are a number of now-lost theogonies, including the theogony commented upon in the Derveni papyrus, as well as extant works such the Orphic Hymns, the Orphic Argonautica, and the Lithica. Shrines containing purported relics of Orpheus were regarded as oracles.

== Etymology ==
Several etymologies for the name Orpheus have been proposed. A probable suggestion is that it is derived from a hypothetical PIE root *h₃órbʰos 'orphan, servant, slave' and ultimately the verb root *h₃erbʰ- 'to change allegiance, status, ownership'. Cognates could include Ancient Greek: ὄρφνη (órphnē; 'darkness') and ὀρφανός (orphanós; 'fatherless, orphan') from which comes English 'orphan' by way of Latin.

Fulgentius, a mythographer of the late 5th to early 6th century AD, gave the unlikely etymology meaning "best voice", "Oraia-phonos".

== Background ==
Although Cicero reported that Aristotle did not believe Orpheus existed, most other ancient writers believed he once was a real person, though living in remote antiquity. Most of them believed that he lived several generations before Homer. The earliest literary reference to Orpheus is a two-word fragment of the 6th-century BC lyric poet Ibycus: onomaklyton Orphēn ('Orpheus famous-of-name'). He is not mentioned by Homer or Hesiod. Most ancient sources accept his historical existence; Aristotle is an exception. Pindar calls Orpheus 'the father of songs' and identifies him as a son of the Thracian mythological king Oeagrus and the Muse Calliope.

Greeks of the Classical age venerated Orpheus as the greatest of all poets and musicians; it was said that while Hermes had invented the lyre, Orpheus perfected it. Poets such as Simonides of Ceos said that Orpheus' music and singing could charm the birds, fish and wild beasts, coax the trees and rocks into dance, and divert the course of rivers.

Orpheus was one of the handful of Greek heroes to visit the underworld and return; his music and song had power even over Hades. The earliest known reference to this descent to the underworld is the painting by Polygnotus (5th century BCE) described by Pausanias (2nd century CE), where no mention is made of Eurydice. Euripides and Plato both refer to the story of his descent to recover his wife, but do not mention her name; a contemporary relief (about 400 BC) shows Orpheus and his wife with Hermes. The elegiac poet Hermesianax called her Agriope; and the first mention of her name in literature is in the Lament for Bion (1st century BC).

Some sources credit Orpheus with further gifts to humankind: medicine, which is more usually under the auspices of Asclepius (Aesculapius) or Apollo; writing, which is usually credited to Cadmus; and agriculture, where Orpheus assumes the Eleusinian role of Triptolemus as giver of Demeter's knowledge to humankind. Orpheus was an augur and seer; he practiced magical arts and astrology, founded cults to Apollo and Dionysus, and prescribed the mystery rites preserved in Orphic texts. Pindar and Apollonius of Rhodes place Orpheus as the harpist and companion of Jason and the Argonauts. Orpheus had a brother named Linus, who went to Thebes and became a Theban. He is claimed by Aristophanes and Horace to have taught cannibals to subsist on fruit, and to have made lions and tigers obedient to him. Horace believed, however, that Orpheus had only introduced order and civilization to savages.

Strabo (64 BC – c. AD 24) presents Orpheus as a mortal, who lived and died in a village close to Olympus. "Some, of course, received him willingly, but others, since they suspected a plot and violence, combined against him and killed him." He made money as a musician and "wizard" – Strabo uses αγυρτεύοντα (agurteúonta), also used by Sophocles in Oedipus Tyrannus to characterize Tiresias as a trickster with an excessive desire for possessions. Αγύρτης (agúrtēs) most often meant 'charlatan' and always had a negative connotation. Pausanias writes of an unnamed Egyptian who considered Orpheus a μάγευσε (mágeuse), i.e., magician.

"Orpheus ... is repeatedly referred to by Euripides, in whom we find the first allusion to the connection of Orpheus with Dionysus and the infernal regions: he speaks of him as related to the Muses (Rhesus 944, 946); mentions the power of his song over rocks, trees, and wild beasts (Medea 543, Iphigenia in Aulis 1211, Bacchae 561, and a jocular allusion in Cyclops 646); refers to his charming the infernal powers (Alcestis 357); connects him with Bacchanalian orgies (Hippolytus 953); ascribes to him the origin of sacred mysteries (Rhesus 943), and places the scene of his activity among the forests of Olympus (Bacchae 561.)" "Euripides [also] brought Orpheus into his play Hypsipyle, which dealt with the Lemnian episode of the Argonautic voyage; Orpheus there acts as coxswain, and later as guardian in Thrace of Jason's children by Hypsipyle."

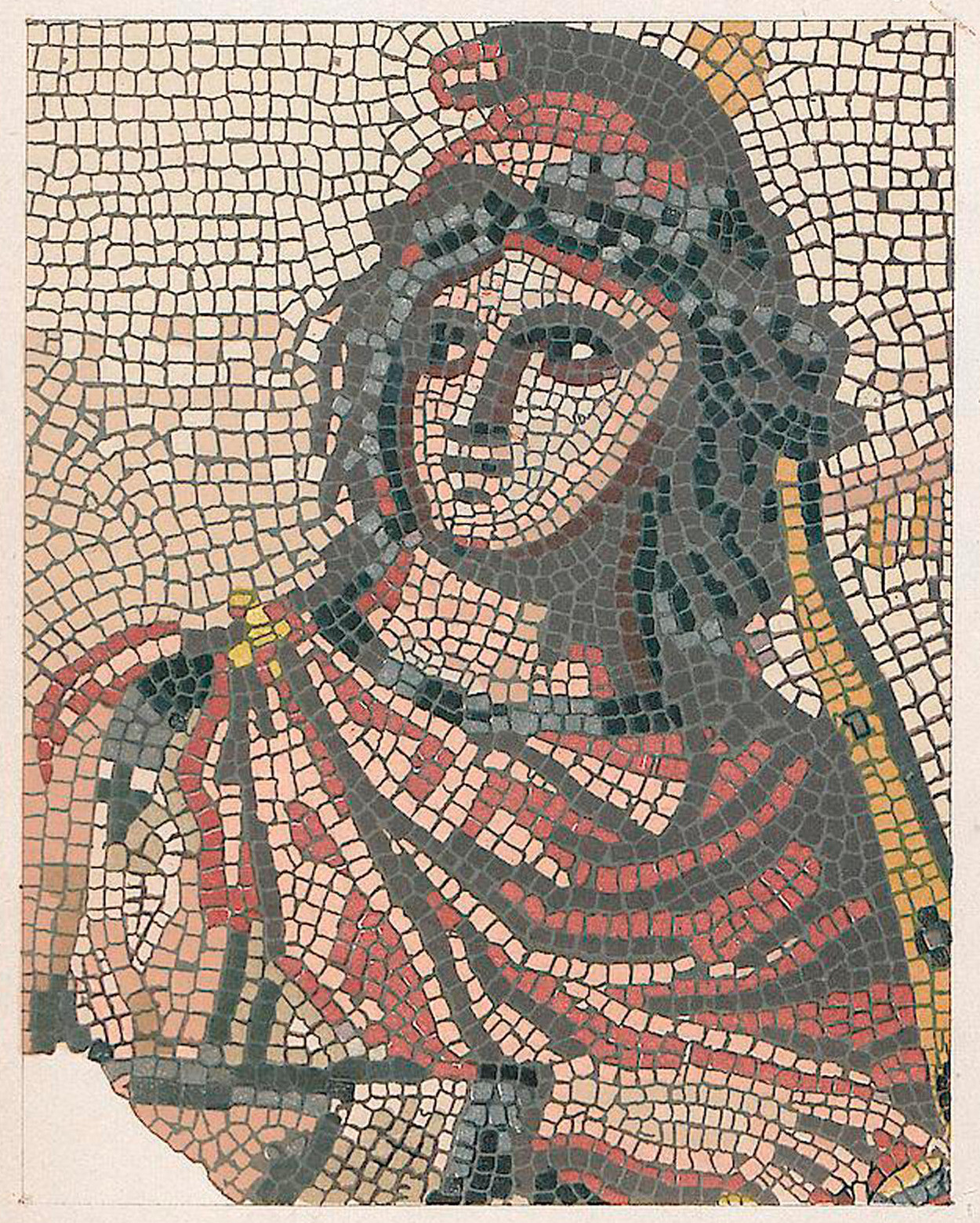
Orpheus mosaic at Dominican Museum, Rottweil, Germany, 2nd c. AD

"He is mentioned once only, but in an important passage, by Aristophanes (Frogs 1032), who enumerates, as the oldest poets, Orpheus, Musaeus, Hesiod, and Homer, and makes Orpheus the teacher of religious initiations and of abstinence from murder ..."

"Plato (Apology, Protagoras), ... frequently refers to Orpheus, his followers, and his works. He calls him the son of Oeagrus (Symposium), mentions him as a musician and inventor (Ion and Laws bk 3.), refers to the miraculous power of his lyre (Protagoras), and gives a singular version of the story of his descent into Hades: the gods, he says, imposed upon the poet, by showing him only a phantasm of his lost wife, because he had not the courage to die, like Alcestis, but contrived to enter Hades alive, and, as a further punishment for his cowardice, he met his death at the hands of women (Symposium 179d)."

"Earlier than the literary references is a sculptured representation of Orpheus with the ship Argo, found at Delphi, said to be of the sixth century BC."

== Mythology ==
Orpheus' genealogy

=== Early life ===
Important sites in the life and travels of Orpheus

According to Apollodorus and a fragment of Pindar, Orpheus' father was Oeagrus, a Thracian king. His mother was (1) the muse Calliope, (2) her sister Polymnia, (3) a daughter of Pierus, son of Makednos or (4) lastly of Menippe, daughter of Thamyris. Pindar, however, seems to call Orpheus the son of Apollo in his Pythian Odes, and a scholium on this passage adds that the mythographer Asclepiades of Tragilus considered Orpheus to be the son of Apollo and Calliope. According to Tzetzes, he was from Bisaltia. His birthplace and place of residence was Pimpleia close to the Olympus. Strabo mentions that he lived in Pimpleia. According to the epic poem Argonautica, Pimpleia was the location of Oeagrus' and Calliope's wedding. While living with his mother and her eight beautiful sisters in Parnassus, he met Apollo, who was courting the laughing muse Thalia. Apollo, as the god of music, gave Orpheus a golden lyre and taught him to play it. Orpheus' mother taught him to make verses for singing. He is also said to have studied in Egypt.

Orpheus is said to have established the worship of Hecate in Aegina. In Laconia Orpheus is said to have brought the worship of Demeter Chthonia and that of the Κόρες Σωτείρας (Kóres Sōteíras; 'Saviour Maidens'). Also in Taygetos a wooden image of Orpheus was said to have been kept by Pelasgians in the sanctuary of the Eleusinian Demeter.

According to Diodorus Siculus, Musaeus of Athens was the son of Orpheus.

=== Adventure as an Argonaut ===
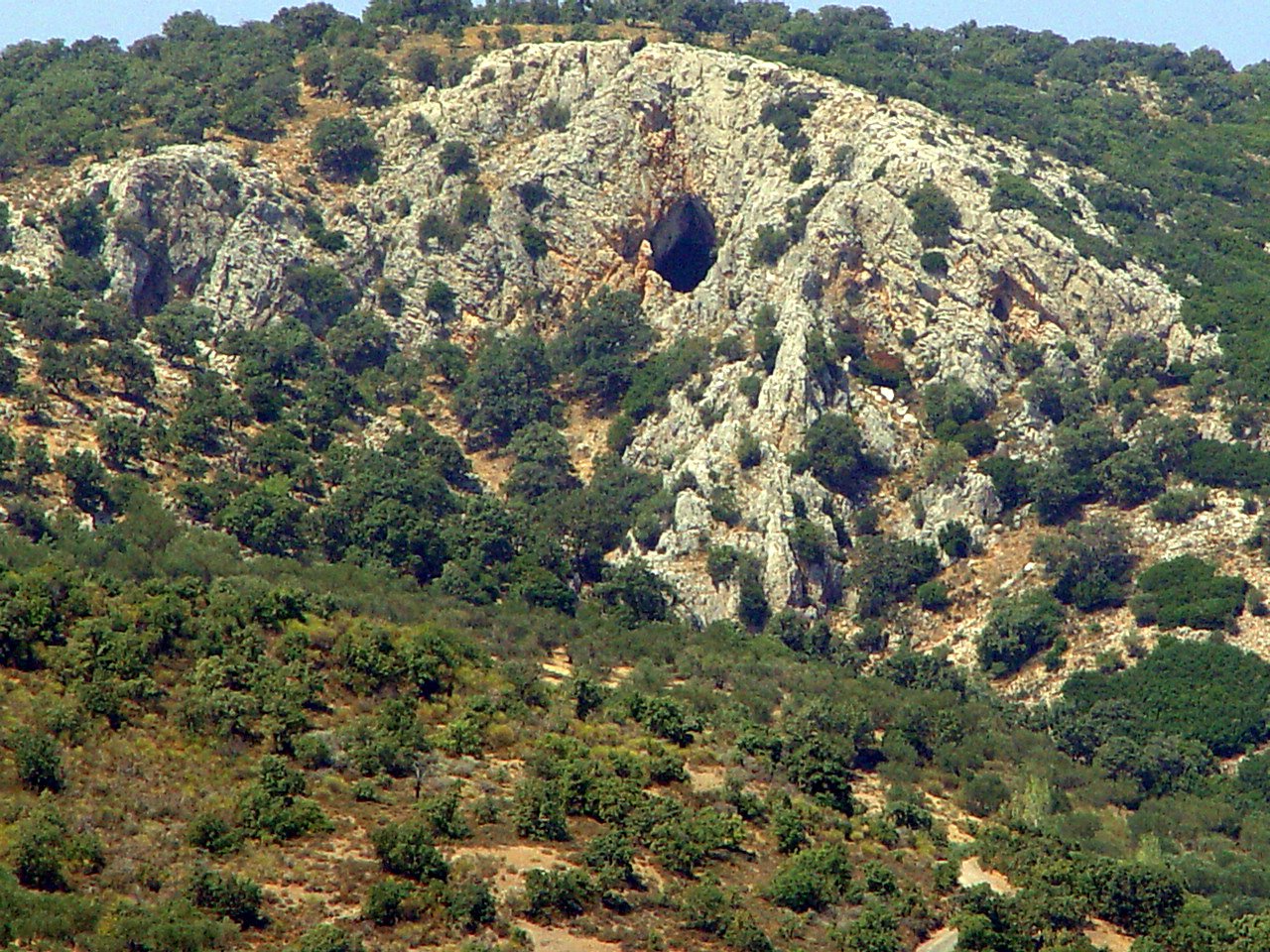
Cave of Orpheus' oracle in Antissa, Lesbos

The Argonautica (Ἀργοναυτικά) is a Greek epic poem written by Apollonius Rhodius in the 3rd century BC. Orpheus took part in this adventure and used his skills to aid his companions. Chiron told Jason that without the aid of Orpheus, the Argonauts would never be able to pass the Sirens—the same Sirens encountered by Odysseus in Homer's epic poem the Odyssey. The Sirens lived on three small, rocky islands called Sirenum scopuli and sang beautiful songs that enticed sailors to come to them, which resulted in the crashing of their ships into the islands. When Orpheus heard their voices, he drew his lyre and played music that was louder and more beautiful, drowning out the Sirens' bewitching songs. According to 3rd century BC Hellenistic elegiac poet Phanocles, Orpheus loved the young Argonaut Calais, "the son of Boreas, with all his heart, and went often in shaded groves still singing of his desire, nor was his heart at rest. But always, sleepless cares wasted his spirits as he looked at fresh Calais."

=== Death of Eurydice ===
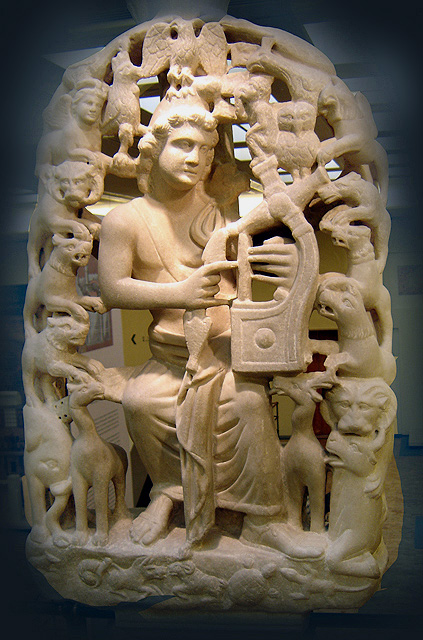
Orpheus with the lyre and surrounded by beasts (Byzantine & Christian Museum, Athens)

The most famous story in which Orpheus figures is that of his wife Eurydice (sometimes referred to as Euridice and also known as Argiope). While walking among her people, the Cicones, in tall grass at her wedding, Eurydice was set upon by a satyr. In her efforts to escape the satyr, Eurydice fell into a nest of vipers and suffered a fatal bite on her heel. Her body was discovered by Orpheus who, overcome with grief, played such sad and mournful songs that all the nymphs and gods wept. On their advice, Orpheus traveled to the underworld. His music softened the hearts of Hades and Persephone, who agreed to allow Eurydice to return with him to earth on one condition: he should walk in front of her and not look back until they both had reached the upper world. Orpheus set off with Eurydice following; however, as soon as he had reached the upper world, he immediately turned to look at her, forgetting in his eagerness that both of them needed to be in the upper world for the condition to be met. As Eurydice had not yet crossed into the upper world, she vanished for the second time, this time forever.

The story in this form belongs to the time of Virgil, who first introduces the name of Aristaeus (by the time of Virgil's Georgics, the myth has Aristaeus chasing Eurydice when she was bitten by a serpent) and the tragic outcome. Other ancient writers, however, speak of Orpheus' visit to the underworld in a more negative light; according to Phaedrus in Plato's Symposium, the infernal gods only "presented an apparition" of Eurydice to him. In fact, Plato's representation of Orpheus is that of a coward, as instead of choosing to die in order to be with the one he loved, he instead mocked the gods by trying to go to Hades to bring her back alive. Since his love was not "true"—he did not want to die for love—he was actually punished by the gods, first by giving him only the apparition of his former wife in the underworld, and then by being killed by women. In Ovid's account, however, Eurydice's death by a snake bite is incurred while she was dancing with naiads on her wedding day.

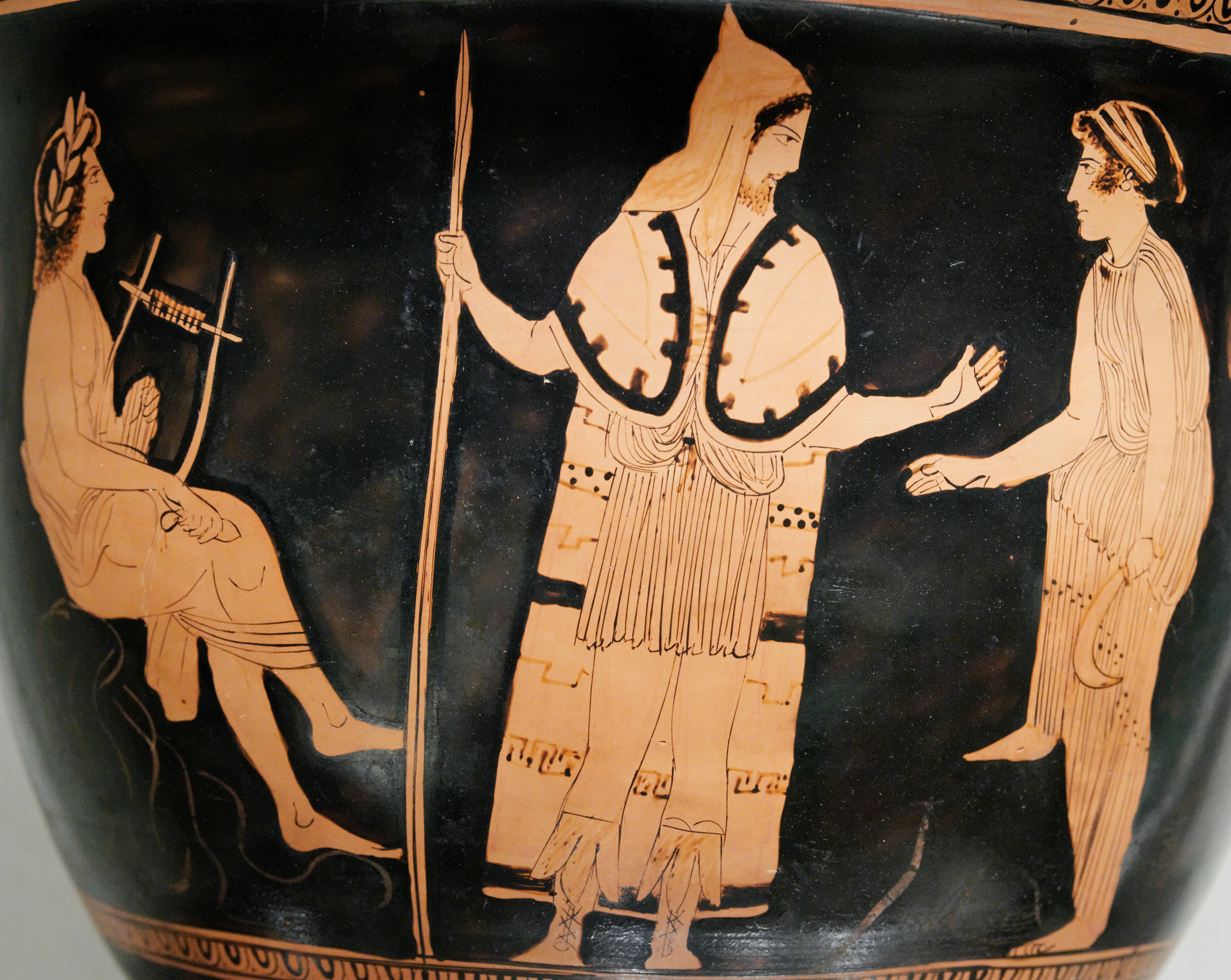
Orpheus (left, with lyre) among the Thracians, from an Attic red-figure bell-krater (c. 440 BC)

Virgil wrote in his poem that Dryads wept from Epirus and Hebrus up to the land of the Getae (north east Danube valley) and even describes him wandering into Hyperborea and Tanais (ancient Greek city in the Don river delta) due to his grief.

The story of Eurydice may actually be a late addition to the Orpheus myths. In particular, the name Eurudike ("she whose justice extends widely") recalls cult-titles attached to Persephone. According to the theories of poet Robert Graves, the myth may have been derived from another Orpheus legend, in which he travels to Tartarus and charms the goddess Hecate.

The myth theme of not looking back, an essential precaution in Jason's raising of chthonic Brimo Hekate under Medea's guidance, is reflected in the Biblical story of Lot's wife when escaping from Sodom. More directly, the story of Orpheus is similar to the ancient Greek tales of Persephone captured by Hades and similar stories of Adonis captive in the underworld. However, the developed form of the Orpheus myth was entwined with the Orphic mystery cults and, later in Rome, with the development of Mithraism and the cult of Sol Invictus.

=== Death ===
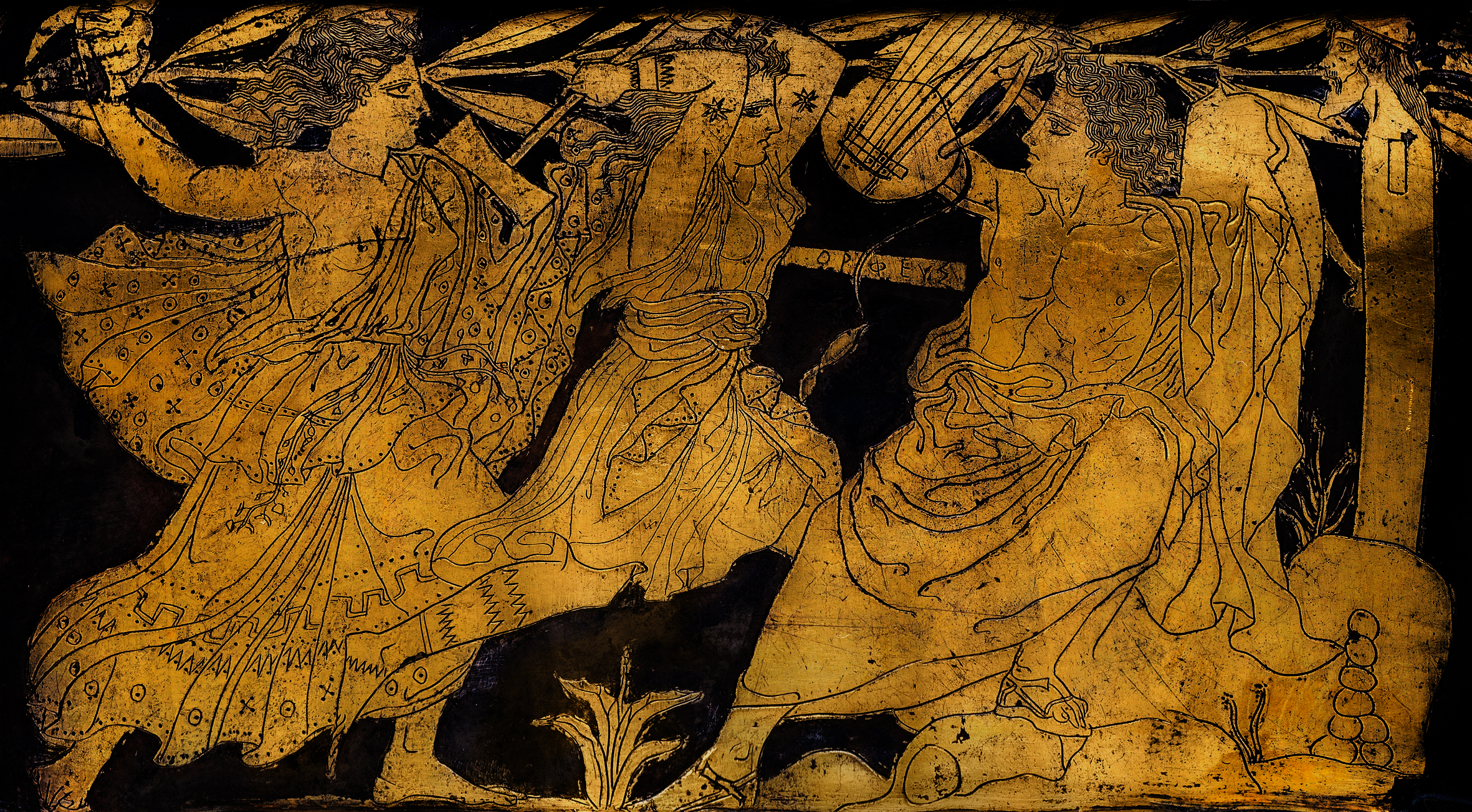
The Death of Orpheus, detail from a silver kantharos, 420–410 BC, part of the Vassil Bojkov collection, Sofia, Bulgaria

According to a Late Antique summary of Aeschylus's lost play Bassarids, Orpheus, towards the end of his life, disdained the worship of all gods except Apollo. One early morning he went to the oracle of Dionysus at Mount Pangaion to salute his god at dawn, but was ripped to shreds by Thracian Maenads for not honoring his previous patron (Dionysus) and was buried in Pieria.

But having gone down into Hades because of his wife and seeing what sort of things were there, he did not continue to worship Dionysus, because of whom he was famous, but he thought Helios to be the greatest of the gods, Helios whom he also addressed as Apollo. Rousing himself each night toward dawn and climbing the mountain called Pangaion, he would await the Sun's rising, so that he might see it first. Therefore, Dionysus, being angry with him, sent the Bassarides, as Aeschylus the tragedian says; they tore him apart and scattered the limbs.

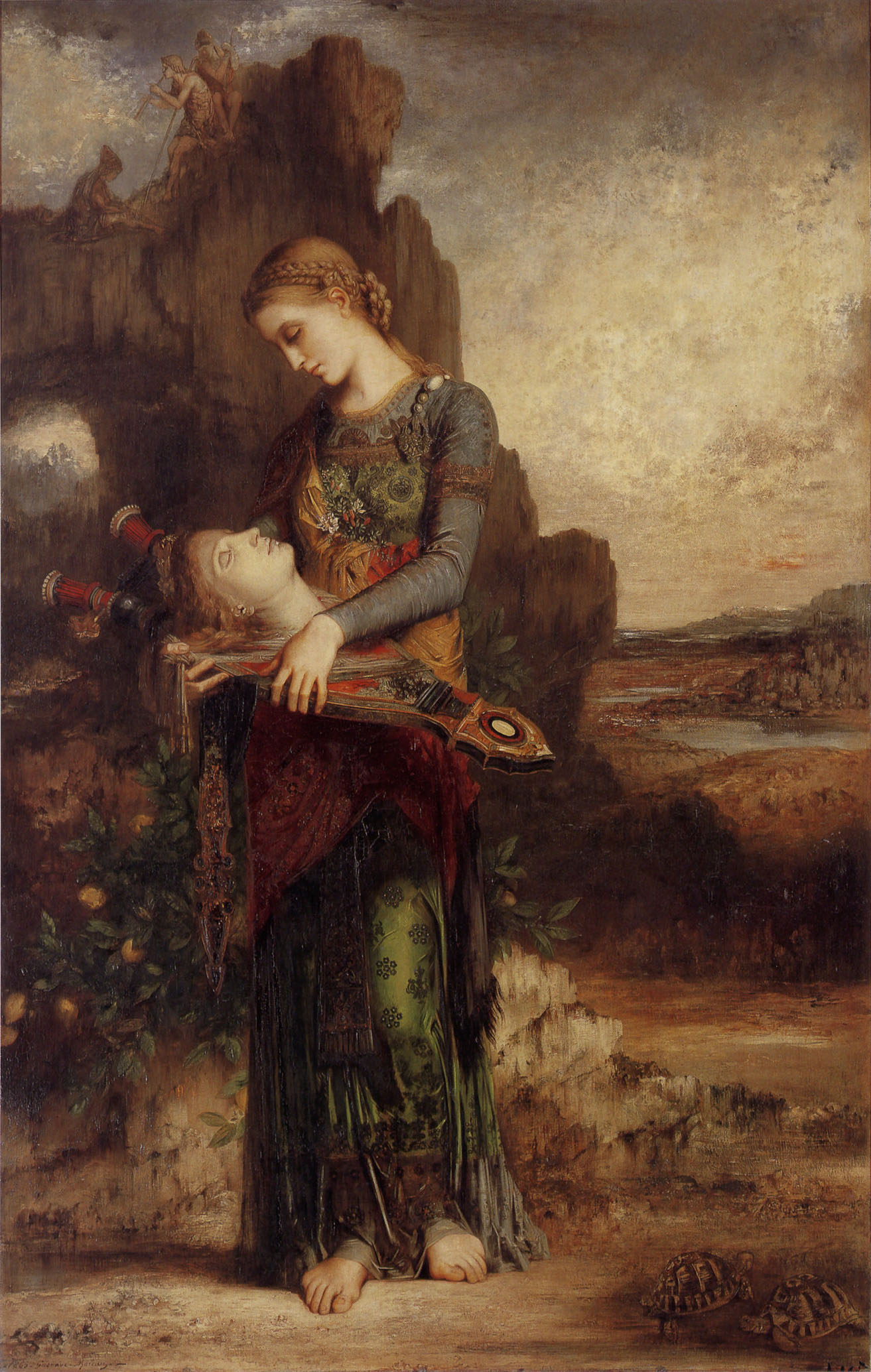
Thracian Girl Carrying the Head of Orpheus on His Lyre (1865) by Gustave Moreau

Here his death is analogous with that of Pentheus, who was also torn to pieces by Maenads; and it has been speculated that the Orphic mystery cult regarded Orpheus as a parallel figure to or even an incarnation of Dionysus. Both made similar journeys into Hades, and Dionysus-Zagreus suffered an identical death. Pausanias writes that Orpheus was buried in Dion and that he met his death there. He writes that the river Helicon sank underground when the women that killed Orpheus tried to wash off their blood-stained hands in its waters. Other legends claim that Orpheus became a follower of Dionysus and spread his cult across the land. In this version of the legend, it is said that Orpheus was torn to shreds by the women of Thrace for his inattention.

Ovid recounts that Orpheus

had abstained from the love of women, either because things ended badly for him, or because he had sworn to do so. Yet, many felt a desire to be joined with the poet, and many grieved at rejection. Indeed, he was the first of the Thracian people to transfer his affection to young boys and enjoy their brief springtime, and early flowering this side of manhood.

— Ovid, trans. A. S. Kline, Ovid: The Metamorphoses, Book X

Feeling spurned by Orpheus for taking only male lovers (eromenoi), the Ciconian women, followers of Dionysus, first threw sticks and stones at him as he played, but his music was so beautiful even the rocks and branches refused to hit him. Enraged, the women tore him to pieces during the frenzy of their Bacchic orgies. In Albrecht Dürer's drawing of Orpheus' death, based on an original, now lost, by Andrea Mantegna, a ribbon high in the tree above him is lettered Orfeus der erst puseran ("Orpheus, the first pederast").

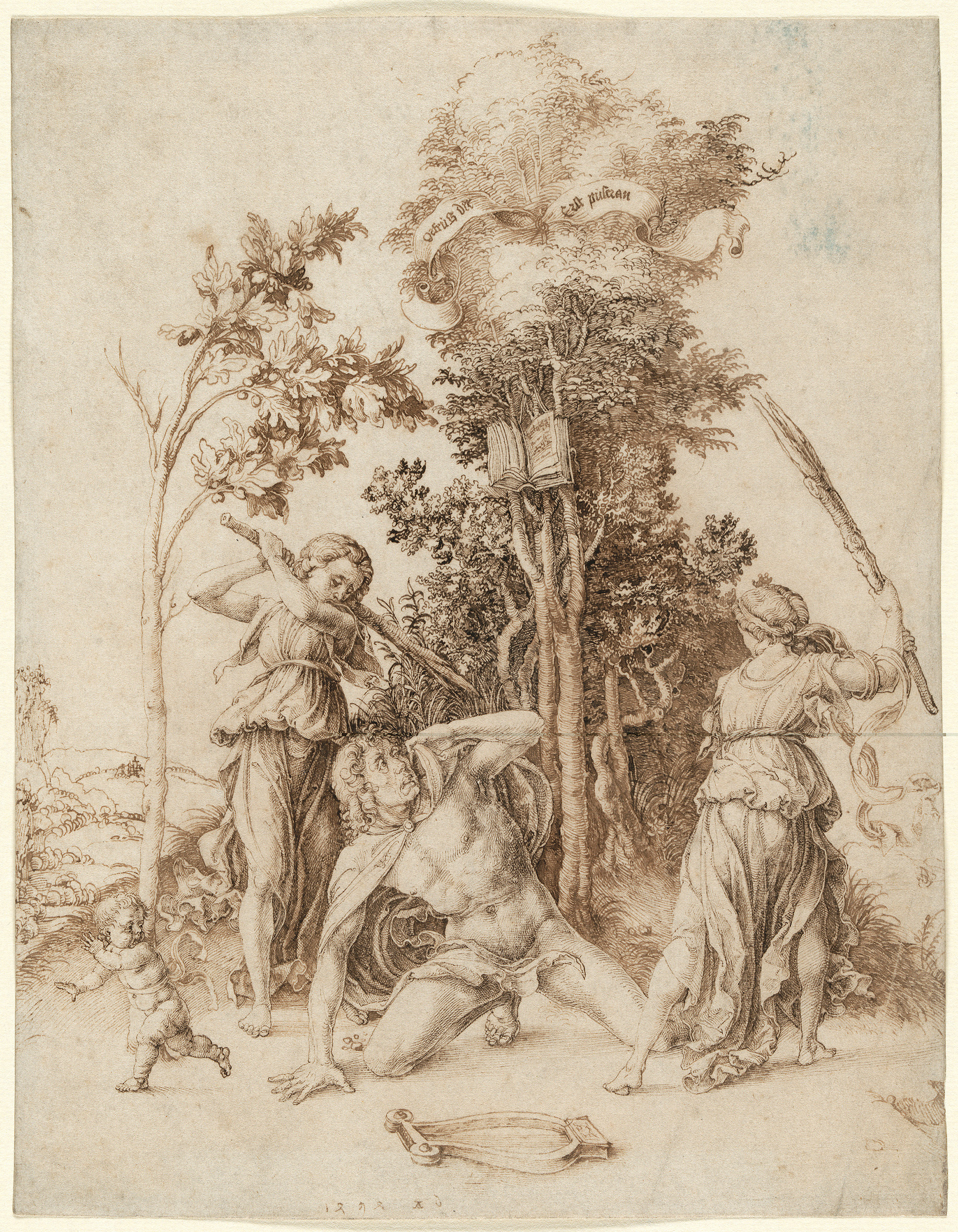
Death of Orpheus (1494) by Albrecht Dürer

His head, still singing mournful songs, floated along with his lyre down the River Hebrus into the sea, after which the winds and waves carried them to the island of Lesbos, at the city of Methymna; there, the inhabitants buried his head and a shrine was built in his honour near Antissa; there his oracle prophesied, until it was silenced by Apollo. In addition to the people of Lesbos, Greeks from Ionia and Aetolia consulted the oracle, and his reputation spread as far as Babylon.

Orpheus' lyre was carried to heaven by the Muses, and was placed among the stars. The Muses also gathered up the fragments of his body and buried them at Leibethra below Mount Olympus, where the nightingales sang over his grave. After the river Sys flooded Leibethra, the Macedonians took his bones to Dion. Orpheus' soul returned to the underworld, to the fields of the Blessed, where he was reunited at last with his beloved Eurydice.

Another legend places his tomb at Dion, near Pydna in Macedon. In another version of the myth, Orpheus travels to Aornum in Thesprotia, Epirus to an old oracle for the dead. In the end Orpheus commits suicide from his grief unable to find Eurydice.

"Others said that he was the victim of a thunderbolt."

== Orphic poems and rites ==
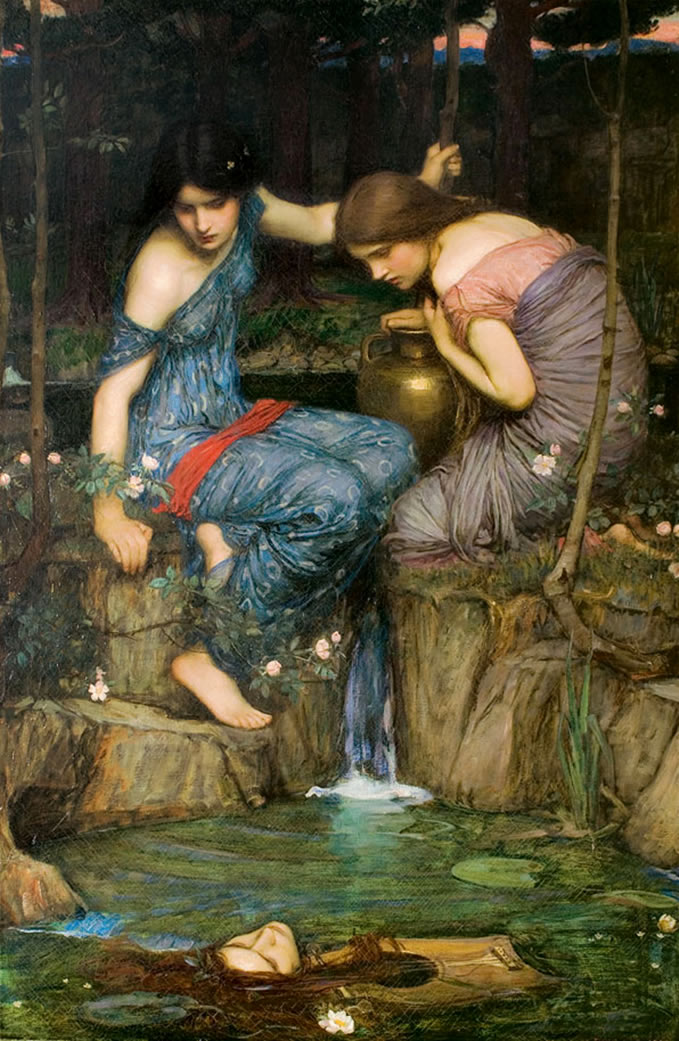
Nymphs Finding the Head of Orpheus (1900) by John William Waterhouse

On the writings of Orpheus, Freeman, in the 1946 edition of The Pre- Socratic Philosophers writes:

In the fifth and fourth centuries BC, there existed a collection of hexametric poems known as Orphic, which were the accepted authority of those who followed the Orphic way of life, and were by them attributed to Orpheus himself. Plato several times quotes lines from this collection; he refers in the Republic to a "mass of books of Musaeus and Orpheus", and in the Laws to the hymns of Thamyris and Orpheus, while in the Ion he groups Orpheus with Musaeus and Homer as the source of inspiration of epic poets and elocutionists. Euripides in the Hippolytus makes Theseus speak of the "turgid outpourings of many treatises", which have led his son to follow Orpheus and adopt the Bacchic religion. Alexis, the fourth century comic poet, depicting Linus offering a choice of books to Heracles, mentions "Orpheus, Hesiod, tragedies, Choerilus, Homer, Epicharmus". Aristotle did not believe that the poems were by Orpheus; he speaks of the "so-called Orphic epic", and Philoponus (seventh century AD) commenting on this expression, says that in the De Philosophia (now lost) Aristotle directly stated his opinion that the poems were not by Orpheus. Philoponus adds his own view that the doctrines were put into epic verse by Onomacritus. Aristotle when quoting the Orphic cosmological doctrines attributes them to "the theologoi", "the ancient poets", "those who first theorized about the gods".

[...]

Aelian (second century AD) gave the chief reason against believing in them: at the time when Orpheus is said to have lived, the Thracians knew nothing about writing. It came therefore to be believed that Orpheus taught, but left no writings, and that the epic poetry attributed to him was written in the sixth century BC by Onomacritus. Onomacritus was banished from Athens by Hipparchus for inserting something of his own into an oracle of Musaeus when entrusted with the editing of his poems. It may have been Aristotle who first suggested, in the lost De Philosophia, that Onomacritus also wrote the so-called Orphic epic poems. By the time when the Orphic writings began to be freely quoted by Christian and Neo-Platonist writers, the theory of the authorship of Onomacritus was accepted by many.

[...]

The Neo-Platonists quote the Orphic poems in their defence against Christianity, because Plato used poems which he believed to be Orphic. It is believed that in the collection of writings which they used there were several versions, each of which gave a slightly different account of the origin of the universe, of gods and men, and perhaps of the correct way of life, with the rewards and punishments attached thereto.

In addition to serving as a storehouse of mythological data along the lines of Hesiod's Theogony, Orphic poetry was recited in mystery-rites and purification rituals. Plato in particular tells of a class of vagrant beggar-priests who would go about offering purifications to the rich, a clatter of books by Orpheus and Musaeus in tow. Those who were especially devoted to these rituals and poems often practiced vegetarianism and abstention from sex, and refrained from eating eggs and beans—which came to be known as the Orphikos bios, or "Orphic way of life". W. K. C. Guthrie wrote that Orpheus was the founder of mystery religions and the first to reveal to men the meanings of the initiation rites. There is also a reference, not mentioning Orpheus by name, in the pseudo-Platonic Axiochus, where it is said that the fate of the soul in Hades is described on certain bronze tablets which two seers had brought to Delos from the land of the Hyperboreans.

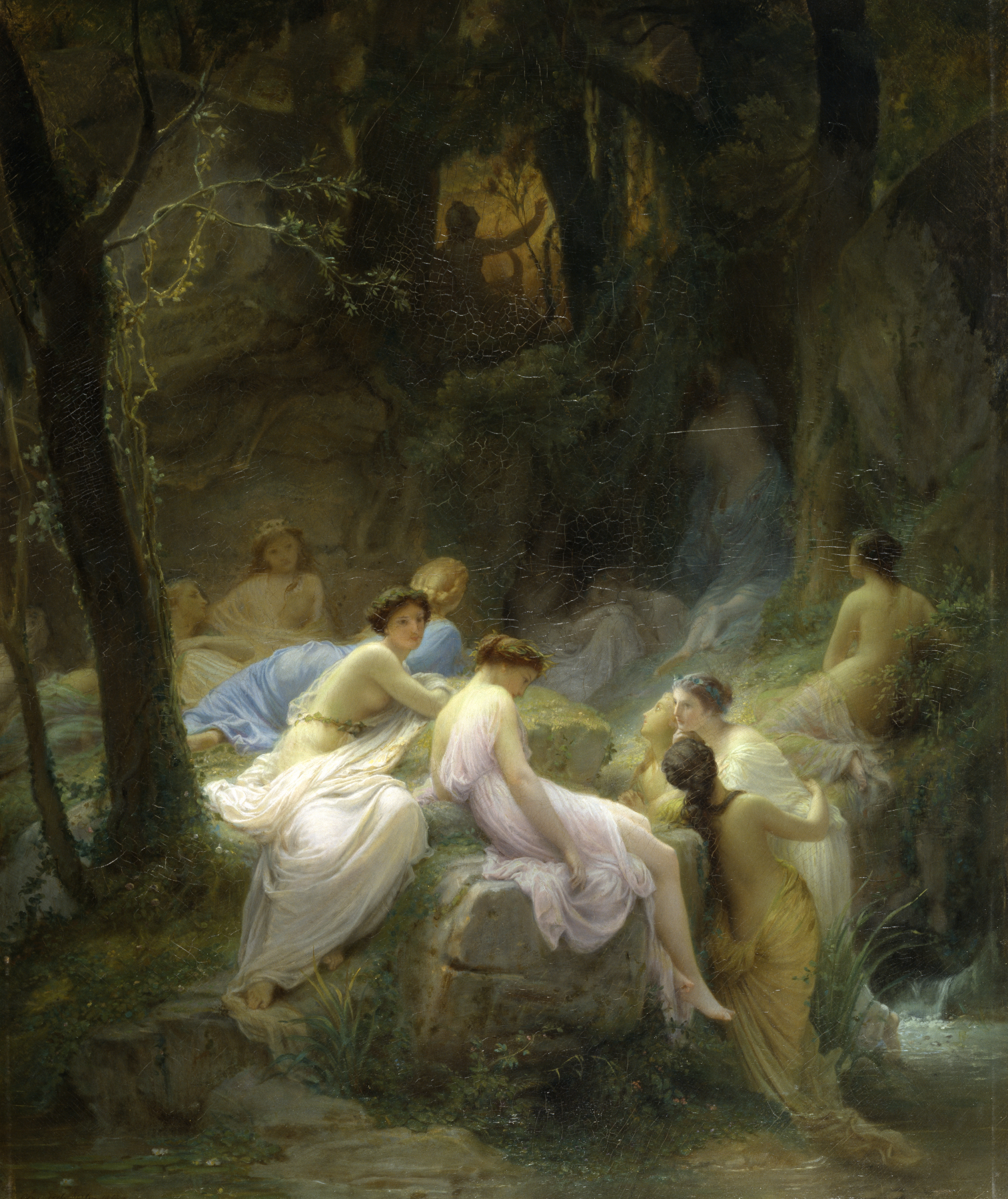
Nymphs Listening to the Songs of Orpheus (1853) by Charles Jalabert

A number of Greek religious poems in hexameters were also attributed to Orpheus, as they were to similar miracle-working figures, like Bakis, Musaeus, Abaris, Aristeas, Epimenides, and the Sibyl. Of this vast literature, only two works survived whole: the Orphic Hymns, a set of 87 poems, possibly composed at some point in the second or third century, and the epic Orphic Argonautica, composed somewhere between the fourth and sixth centuries. Earlier Orphic literature, which may date back as far as the sixth century BC, survives only in papyrus fragments or in quotations. Some of the earliest fragments may have been composed by Onomacritus.

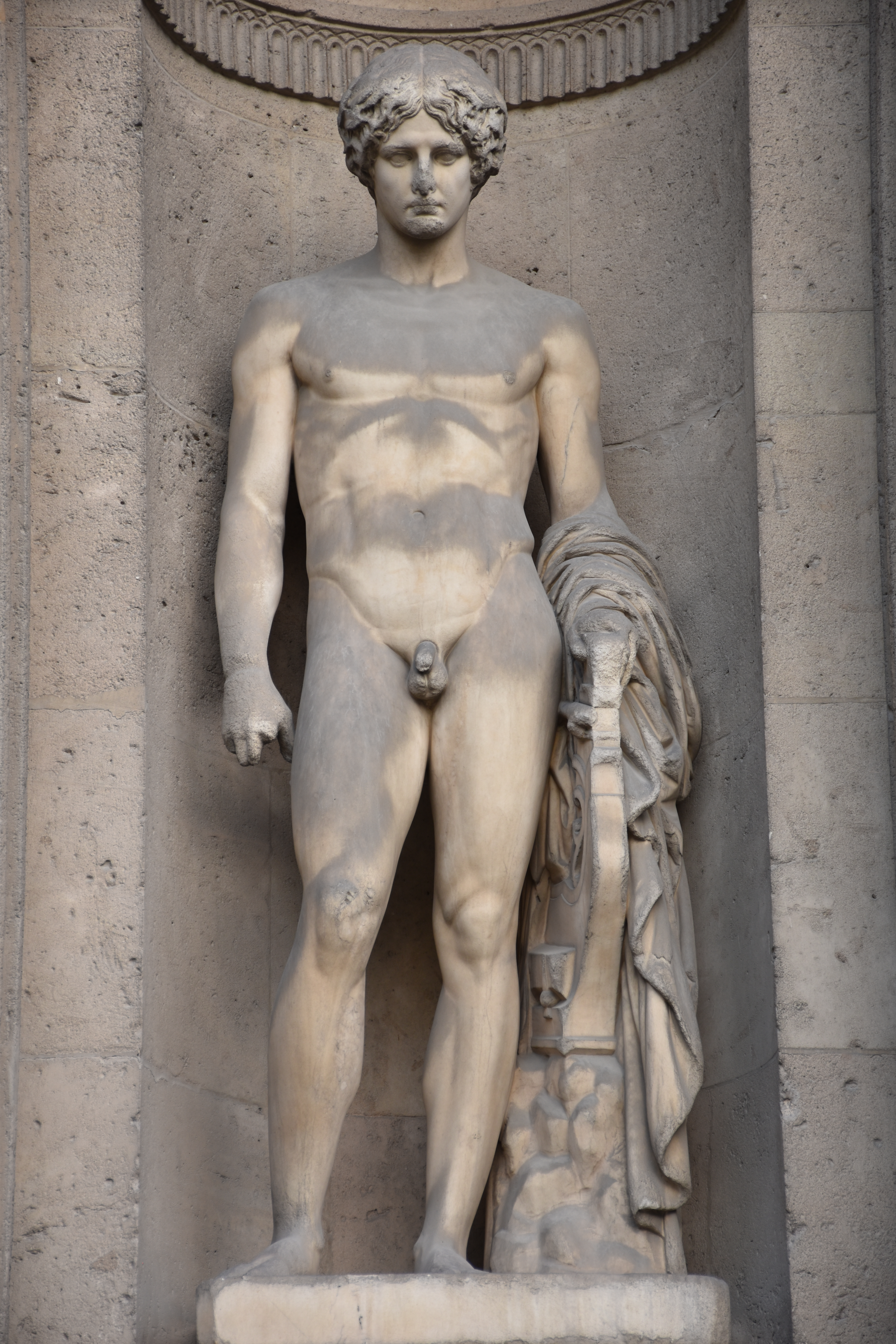
Orpheus (1854), by Gabriel Thomas

The Derveni papyrus, found in Derveni, Macedonia (Greece) in 1962, contains a philosophical treatise that is an allegorical commentary on an Orphic poem in hexameters, a theogony concerning the birth of the gods, produced in the circle of the philosopher Anaxagoras, written in the second half of the fifth century BC. The papyrus dates to around 340 BC, during the reign of Philip II of Macedon, making it Europe's oldest surviving manuscript.

== Post-Classical interpretations ==
=== Classical music ===
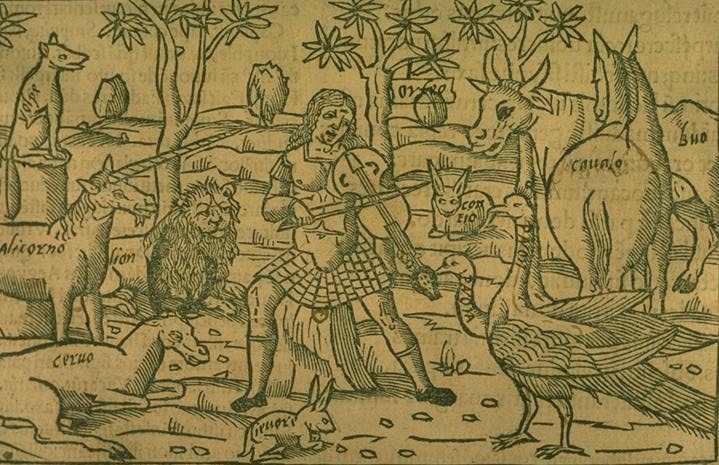
Orpheus charming the beasts. Engraving by Regius for Ovid's Metamorphoses Book X, 143

The Orpheus motif has permeated Western culture and has been used as a theme in all art forms. Early examples include the Breton lai Sir Orfeo from the early 13th century and musical interpretations like Jacopo Peri's Euridice (1600, though titled with his wife's name, the libretto is based entirely upon books X and XI of Ovid's Metamorphoses and therefore Orpheus' viewpoint is predominant).

Subsequent operatic and musical interpretations include:

- Claudio Monteverdi's L'Orfeo (1607)
- Luigi Rossi's Orfeo (1647)
- Marc-Antoine Charpentier's La descente d'Orphée aux enfers H.488 (1686). Charpentier also composed a cantata, Orphée descendant aux enfers H.471, (1683)
- Christoph Willibald Gluck's Orfeo ed Euridice (1762)
- Joseph Haydn's last opera L'anima del filosofo, ossia Orfeo ed Euridice (1791)
- Franz Liszt's symphonic poem Orpheus (1854)
- Jacques Offenbach's operetta Orphée aux Enfers (1858)
- Igor Stravinsky's ballet Orpheus (1948)
- Two operas by Harrison Birtwistle: The Mask of Orpheus (1973–1984) and The Corridor (2009)
- Vladimir Genin's mono-opera (monodrama) Orpheus. Eurydike. Hermes (2017) after the text by Rainer Maria Rilke, premiered in 2023 in Pierre Boulez Saal Berlin
- Anaïs Mitchell's musical Hadestown (concept 2006 / Off-Broadway 2016 / Broadway 2019)

=== Literature ===
Rainer Maria Rilke's Sonnets to Orpheus (1922) are based on the Orpheus myth. Poul Anderson's Hugo Award-winning novelette "Goat Song", published in 1972, is a retelling of the story of Orpheus in a science fiction setting. Some feminist interpretations of the myth give Eurydice greater weight. Margaret Atwood's Orpheus and Eurydice Cycle (1976–1986) deals with the myth, and gives Eurydice a more prominent voice. Sarah Ruhl's Eurydice likewise presents the story of Orpheus' descent to the underworld from Eurydice's perspective. Ruhl removes Orpheus from the center of the story by pairing their romantic love with the paternal love of Eurydice's dead father. David Almond's 2014 novel A Song for Ella Grey was inspired by the myth of Orpheus and Eurydice, and won the Guardian Children's Fiction Prize in 2015. Orpheus appears as a character in the Sandman comics series, issue The Song Of Orpheus, written by Neil Gaiman and drawn by Bryan Talbot. Apart from replacing the father of Orpheus as Morpheus himself, it's a fairly straight retelling of the myth. The character of Orpheus appears in two other issues of the series.

=== Film and stage ===
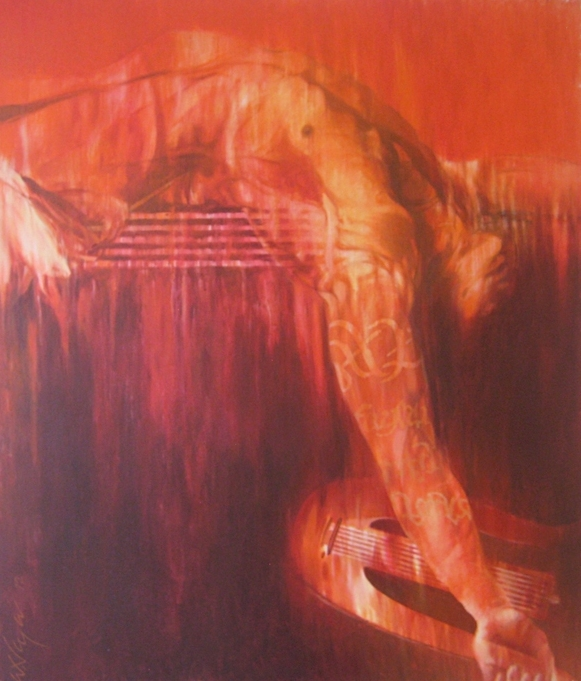
Death of Orpheus by Mexican artist Antonio García Vega

Vinicius de Moraes’s play Orfeu da Conceição (1956), later adapted by Marcel Camus in the 1959 film Black Orpheus, tells the story in the modern context of a favela in Rio de Janeiro during Carnaval. Jean Cocteau's Orphic Trilogy – The Blood of a Poet (1930), Orpheus (1950) and Testament of Orpheus (1959) – was filmed over thirty years, and is based in many ways on the story. Philip Glass adapted the second film into the chamber opera Orphée (1991), part of an homage triptych to Cocteau. Anaïs Mitchell's 2010 folk opera musical Hadestown retells the tragedy of Orpheus and Eurydice with a score inspired by American blues and jazz, portraying Hades as the brutal work-boss of an underground mining city. Mitchell, together with director Rachel Chavkin, later adapted her album into a multiple Tony award-winning stage musical.

== See also ==
- Katabasis
- List of Orphean operas
- Pierian Spring

== Bibliography ==
- Pseudo-Apollodorus, Bibliotheke I, iii, 2; ix, 16 & 25;
- Apollonius Rhodius, Argonautica I, 23–34; IV, 891–909.
- Bernabé, Alberto (1996), Poetae epici Graeci: Testimonia et fragmenta, Pars I, Bibliotheca Teubneriana, Stuttgart and Leipzig, Teubner, 1996. ISBN 978-3-815-41706-5. Online version at De Gruyter.
- Bernabé, Alberto (2005), Poetae epici Graeci: Testimonia et fragmenta, Pars II: Orphicorum et Orphicis similium testimonia et fragmenta, Fasc 2, Bibliotheca Teubneriana, Munich and Leipzig, K. G. Saur Verlag, 2005. ISBN 978-3-598-71708-6. Online version at De Gruyter.
- Freeman, Kathleen (1946), The Pre-Socratic Philosophers: Companion to Diels, Fragmente Der Vorsokratiker, Oxford: Basil Blackwell, 1946. Internet Archive.
- Freeman, Kathleen (1948), Ancilla to the Pre-Socratic Philosophers: A Complete Translation of the Fragments in Diels, Fragmente Der Vorsokratiker, Oxford: Basil Blackwell, 1948. Internet Archive.
- Gantz, Timothy, Early Greek Myth: A Guide to Literary and Artistic Sources, Johns Hopkins University Press, 1996, Two volumes: ISBN 978-0-8018-5360-9 (Vol. 1), ISBN 978-0-8018-5362-3 (Vol. 2).
- Garezou, Maria-Xeni, "Orpheus", in Lexicon Iconographicum Mythologiae Classicae (LIMC). VII.1: Oidipous – Theseus, Zurich and Munich, Artemis Verlag, 1994. ISBN 3760887511. Internet Archive.
- Guthrie, William Keith Chambers, Orpheus and Greek Religion: a Study of the Orphic Movement, 1935.
- Kerenyi, Karl (1959). The Heroes of the Greeks. New York/London: Thames and Hudson.
- Moore, Clifford H., Religious Thought of the Greeks, 1916. Kessinger Publishing (April 2003). ISBN 978-0-7661-5130-7
- Ossoli, Margaret Fuller, Orpheus, a sonnet about his trip to the underworld.
- Ovid, Metamorphoses X, 1–105; XI, 1–66;
- Pindar, Olympian Odes. Pythian Odes, edited and translated by William H. Race, Loeb Classical Library No. 56, Cambridge, Massachusetts, Harvard University Press, 1997. ISBN 978-0-674-99564-2. Online version at Harvard University Press.
- Pindar, Nemean Odes. Isthmian Odes. Fragments, Edited and translated by William H. Race. Loeb Classical Library No. 485. Cambridge, Massachusetts: Harvard University Press, 1997. ISBN 978-0-674-99534-5. Online version at Harvard University Press.
- Christoph Riedweg, "Orfeo", in: S. Settis (a cura di), I Greci: Storia Cultura Arte Società, volume II, 1, Turin 1996, 1251–1280.
- Christoph Riedweg, "Orpheus oder die Magie der musiké. Antike Variationen eines einflussreichen Mythos", in: Th. Fuhrer / P. Michel / P. Stotz (Hgg.), Geschichten und ihre Geschichte, Basel 2004, 37–66.
- Segal, Charles (1989). Orpheus : The Myth of the Poet. Baltimore: Johns Hopkins University Press. ISBN 0-8018-3708-1.
- Smith, William; Dictionary of Greek and Roman Biography and Mythology, London (1873). "Orpheus"
- West, Martin L., The Orphic Poems, 1983. There is a sub-thesis in this work that early Greek religion was heavily influenced by Central Asian shamanistic practices. One major point of contact was the ancient Crimean city of Olbia.
- Wise, R. Todd, A Neocomparative Examination of the Orpheus Myth As Found in the Native American and European Traditions, 1998. UMI. The thesis explores Orpheus as a single mythic structure present in traditions that extend from antiquity to contemporary times and across cultural contexts.
- Wroe, Ann, Orpheus: The Song of Life, The Overlook Press, New York, 2012.
