= Onomacritus =

5th-century BC Athenian compiler of oracles

Onomacritus (Ancient Greek: Ὀνομάκριτος; c. 530 – c. 480 BC), also spelled Onomacritos and Onomakritos, was a Greek chresmologue, or compiler of oracles, who lived at the court of the tyrant Pisistratus in Athens and prepared an edition of the Homeric poems. He was a collector and forger of oracles and poems.

== Herodotus ==
Herodotus reports that Onomacritus was hired by Pisistratus to compile the oracles of Musaeus, but that Onomacritus inserted forgeries of his own that were detected by Lasus of Hermione. As a result, Onomacritus was banished from Athens by Pisistratus' son Hipparchus. After the flight of the Pisistratids to Persia, Onomacritus was reconciled with them. According to Herodotus, Onomacritus induced Xerxes I, the King of Persia, by his oracular responses, to decide upon his war with Greece.

== Pausanias and Orphic attributions ==
Pausanias attributes to Onomacritus certain poems forged under the name of Musaeus. In explaining the presence of the Titan Anytos at Lycosura, he wrote: "From Homer the name of the Titans was taken by Onomakritos, who in the orgies he composed for Dionysos made the Titans the authors of the god's sufferings." That is, Pausanias attributed to Onomacritus the telling of the myth of Dionysus's dismemberment by the Titans.

According to Tatian, the literature attributed to Orpheus was "arranged" by Onomacritus. Onomacritus's association with the works of Orpheus can also be found in the writings of Sextus Empiricus and Clement of Alexandria, and in the Suda, two works, the Orphic Chresmoi and Teletai, are said to have been written by him.

Among 17th-century scholars of Orphism who were sceptical of the notion of Orpheus himself having composed the works attributed to him, the idea of Onomacritus having instead been responsible for these writings, fully or in part, was a convenient alternative. The Dutch scholar Daniel Heinsius argued that the poet referred to as "Orpheus" was in fact Onomacritus himself, while the Danish scholar Ole Borch argued that while the Orphic Argonautica was "Pisistratean", other works such as the Orphic Hymns and the Orphic Lithica were the genuine writings of Orpheus himself. The French philologist Jean-Baptiste Souchay, writing in the first half of the 18th century, believed that while the Orphic Hymns were composed by Orpheus, Onomacritus converted them into the Ionian dialect.
