= Linus of Thrace =

Legendary musician in Greek mythology

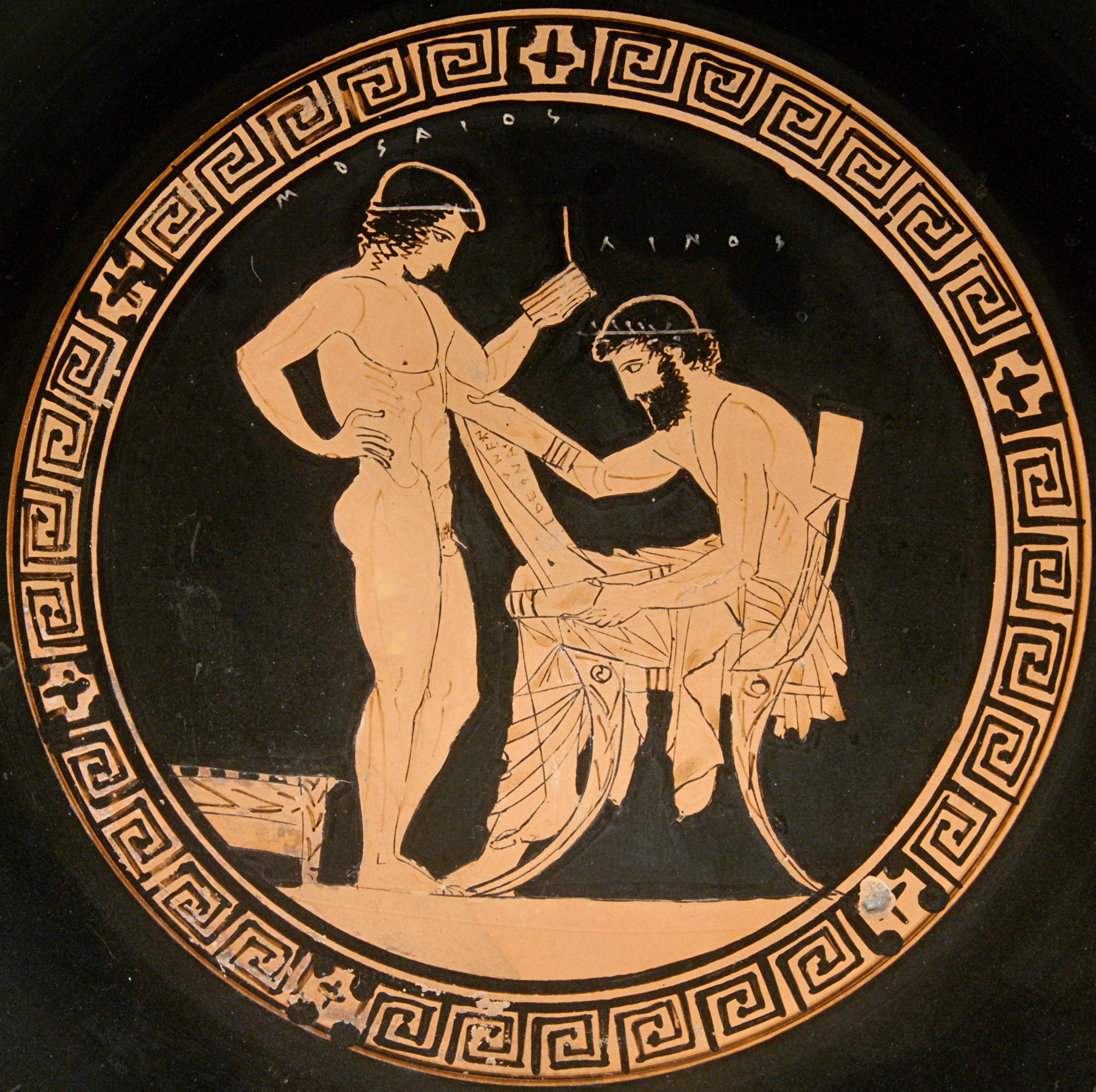
Linus teaches the letters to Musaeus on the tondo of a kylix. Eretria Painter, circa 440/35 BC. Paris, Louvre.

In Greek mythology, Linus (Ancient Greek: Λῖνος Linos "flax") was a reputed musician and master of eloquent speech. He was regarded as the first leader of lyric song.

== Family ==
Linus's parentage was variously given in ancient sources as: (1) Muse Calliope and Oeagrus or Apollo, (2) Muse Urania and Apollo, (3) Urania and Amphimarus, son of Poseidon, (4) the river-god Ismenius, (5) Urania and Hermes, (6) Muse Terpsichore and Apollo, (7) Muse Clio and Magnes, (8) Pierus, (9) Apollo and Aethusa, daughter of Poseidon, and lastly (10) Apollo and Chalciope. With various genealogy given, Linus was usually represented as the brother of another musician Orpheus. Some accounts instead make the latter his great-grandson through Pierus, father of Oeagrus.

Comparative table of Linus's family
Relation	Names	Sources										
Relation	Names	Homer	Hesiod	Apollodorus	Hyginus	Pausanias		Diogenes	Suda	Tzetzes		Contest
Parents	Aethusa and Apollo	✓										✓
Parents	Urania		✓									
Parents	Calliope and Oiagrus or Apollo			✓								
Parents	Urania and Apollo				✓							
Parents	Urania and Amphimarus					✓			✓			
Parents	Ismenius						✓					
Parents	Urania and Hermes							✓	✓			
Parents	Terpsichore and Apollo								✓			
Parents	Aethuse								✓			
Parents	Clio and Magnes									✓		
Parents	Pierus										✓	
Sibling	Orpheus			✓								
Offspring	Pierus								✓			

== Biography ==
Linus may have been the personification of a dirge or lamentation (threnody), as there was a classical Greek song genre known as linos, a form of dirge, which was sometimes seen as a lament for him. This would account for his being the son of Apollo and a Muse, and by which fact, Linus was also considered the inventor of melody and rhythm or of dirges (thrênoi) and songs in general. Thus, he was called "pantoiês sophiês dedaêkôs" by Hesiod. Either he or his brother Orpheus was regarded as the inventor of the harp; otherwise Linus was credited to be the first to use the harp accompanied with singing. From his father Apollo, he received the three-stringed lute. Later writers wrote verses in his name, some lines of which have survived.

During the Hellenistic period, Alexandrine grammarians even regarded Linus as a historical personage and according to a legend, he was known as the writer of apocryphal works in which he described exploits of the god Dionysus and other mythical legends. With these, he was among other mythical authors, like Musaeus and Orpheus, of Pelasgic writings. Diogenes Laertius ascribes to him several poetical productions, such as a cosmogony on the course of the sun and moon, on the generation of animals and fruits, and the like. His poem begins with the line: "Time was when all things grew up at once;.."

== Mythology ==
Linus was said to have lived during the reign of Cadmus in Thebes and became important in the art of music along with Amphion and Zethus (1420 BC). In the Suda, Linus was said to have been the first to bring the alphabet from Phoenicia to the Greeks but Diodorus Siculus gives a different account.

...when Cadmus brought from Phoenicia the letters, as they are called, Linus was again the first to transfer them into the Greek language, to give a name to each character, and to fix its shape. Now the letters, as a group, are called "Phoenician" because they were brought to the Greeks from the Phoenicians, but as single letters the Pelasgians were the first to make use of the transferred characters and so they were called.

The same author recounted that Marsyas was flayed by Apollo who broke the strings of the lyre as well as the harmony he had discovered. The harmony of the strings, however, was rediscovered, when the Muses added later the middle string, Linus struck the string with the forefinger, and Orpheus and Thamyras the lowest string and the one next to it. According to Hyginus, Linus won the contest of singing during the games for the Argives conducted by Acastus, son of Pelias.

=== Versions of Death ===
==== by Apollo ====
According to Boeotian tradition, Apollo slew Linus with his arrows for being his rival in a musical contest (Linus's parentage here was described as the son of Urania and Amphimarus) and near Mount Helicon his image stood in a hollow rock, formed in the shape of a grotto. Every year before sacrifices were offered to the Muses, a funeral sacrifice was offered to him, and dirges (linoi) were sung in his honour. His tomb was claimed both by the city of Argos and by Thebes. Chalcis in Euboea likewise boasted of possessing the tomb of Linus, the inscription of which is preserved by Diogenes Laertius.

Here Linus, whom Urania bore, The fair-crowned Muse,
sleeps on a foreign shore.

==== by Heracles ====
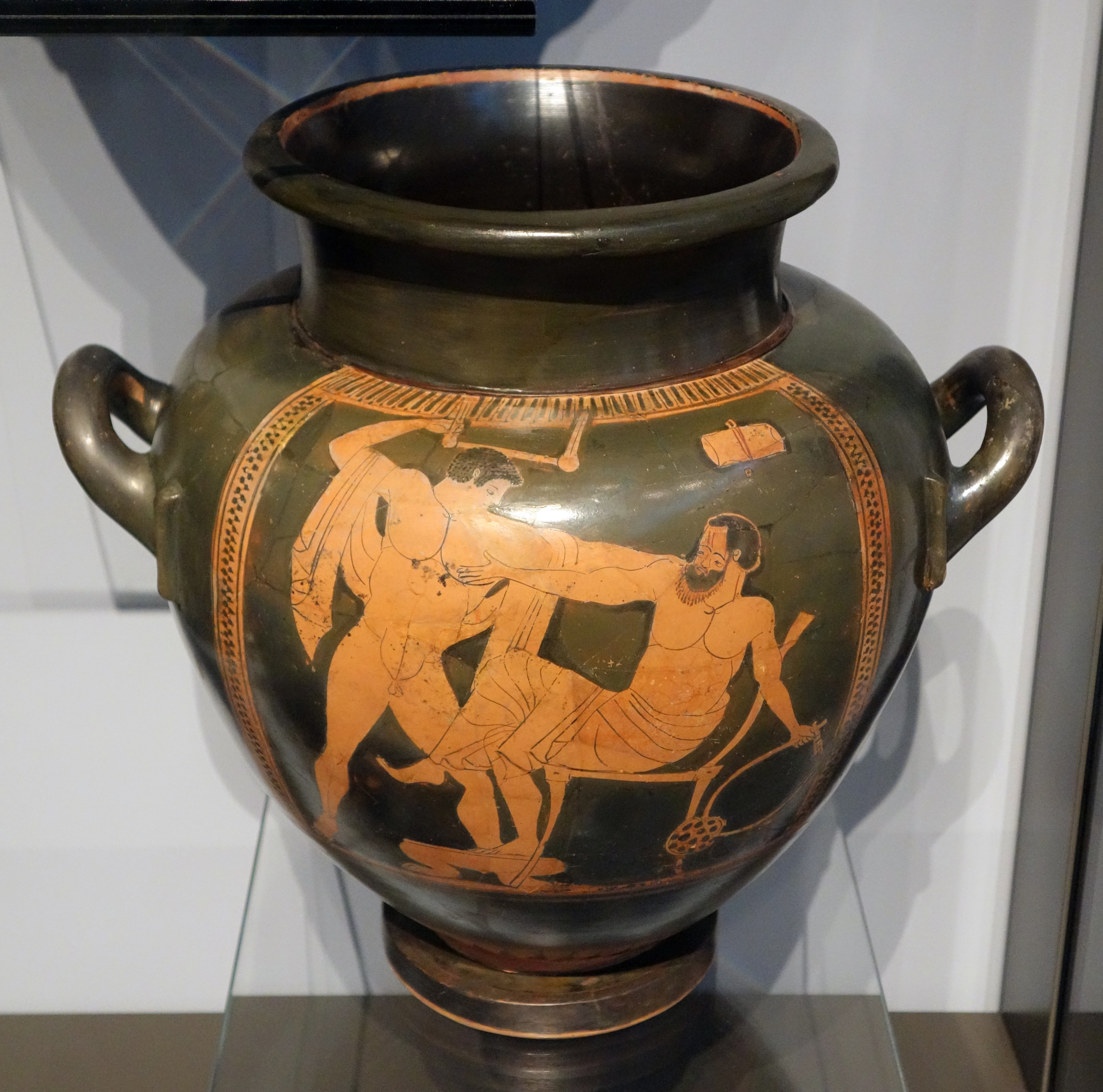
Heracles attacks Linos on a red-figure stamnos by the Tyszkiewicz Painter, c. 480 BC (Museum of Fine Arts, Boston)

Linus also, who was admired because of his poetry and singing, had many pupils, and four of greatest renown, Heracles, Thamyris, Orpheus, and Musaeus. After he went to Thebes and became a Theban, he taught music as well as letters to the young Heracles. The boy, learning to play the lyre, was unable to appreciate what was taught him because of his sluggishness of soul. While Heracles was touching the instrument unmusically, Linus reprimanded him for making errors and punished him with rods. The pupil flew into a rage and violently struck his teacher with his own lyre. When he was tried for murder, Heracles quoted a law of Rhadamanthys, who laid it down that whoever defends himself against a wrongful aggressor shall go free, and so he was acquitted. He was then sent by his mortal father, Amphitryon to tend his cowherds.

A tale about the education of Heracles under Linus's tutelage was recorded by Athenaeus, in which he told of a play entitled Linus by the poet Alexis,

... Alexis, poet tells in the play entitled Linus. He imagines Heracles as being educated in the house of Linus and as having been bidden to select from a large number of books lying beside him and read. So he picked up a book on cookery and held it in both hands very carefully. Linus speaks: "Go up and take whatever book from there you wish; then looking very carefully at the titles, quietly and at your leisure, you shall read".

According to Pausanias, Linus's death was very prominent that mourning to him spread widely even to all foreign land that even Egyptians made a Linus song, in the language called Maneros. He also added that of the Greek poets, Homer shows that he knew of the sufferings of Linus were the theme of a Greek song when he says, that Hephaestus, among the other scenes he worked upon the shield of Achilles, represented a boy harpist singing the Linus song: "In the midst of them a boy on a clear-toned lyre Played with great charm, and to his playing sang of beautiful Linus."

It is probably owing to the difficulty of reconciling the different myths about Linus, that the Thebans thought it necessary to distinguish between an earlier and later Linus; the earlier Linus who was killed by Apollo and the later who was said to have instructed Heracles in music, but to have been killed by the hero.

Hercules, being the Roman equivalent of the Greek figure Heracles, is also said to have killed Linus.

== Interpretation ==
The principal places in Greece which are the scenes of the legends about Linus are Argos and Thebes, and the legends themselves bear a strong resemblance to those about Hyacinthus, Narcissus, Glaucus, Adonis, Maneros, and others, all of whom are conceived as handsome and lovely youths, and either as princes or as shepherds. They are the favourites of the gods; and in the midst of the enjoyment of their happy youth, they are carried off by a sudden or violent death; but their remembrance is kept alive by men, who celebrate their memory in dirges and appropriate rites, and seek the vanished youths generally about the middle of summer, but in vain. The feeling which seems to have given rise to the stories about these personages, who form a distinct class by themselves in Greek mythology, is deeply felt grief at the catastrophes observable in nature, which dies away under the influence of the burning sun (Apollo) soon after it has developed all its fairest beauties.

Those popular dirges, therefore, originally the expression of grief at the premature death of nature through the heat of the sun, were transformed into lamentations of the deaths of youths, and were sung on certain religious occasions. They were afterwards considered to have been the productions of the very same youths whose memory was celebrated in them. The whole class of songs of this kind was called thrênoi oiktoi, and the most celebrated and popular among them was the linos, which appears to have been popular even in the days of Homer. Pamphos, the Athenian, and Sappho, sang of Linus under the name of Oetolinus (oitos Linou, i. e. the death of Linus); and the tragic poets, in mournful choral odes, often use the form ailinos, which is a compound of at, the interjection, and Line. As regards the etymology of Linus, Welcker regards it as formed from the mournful interjection, li, while others, on the analogy of Hyacinthus and Narcissus, consider Linus to have originally been the name of a flower (a species of narcissus).

== Linus's family tree ==
÷Linus's parentage

== Namesake ==
- Linus Beach in Antarctica is named after Linus of Thrace.
