= Epactaeus =

Epithet of Poseidon

In Greek mythology, Epactaeus, Epactius, Epaktaios or Epaktios – that is, the god worshipped on the coast – was used as a surname of Poseidon in Samos, and of Apollo.
