= Gynaikon Limen =

Gynaikon Limen (Ancient Greek: Γυναικῶν λιμὴν; "Women's Harbor"), was an anchorage located between Anaplus and Leostheneion in Thrace at the shore of the Bosporus, close to a place called Phidalia (Φιδάλια) or Phidaleia (Φιδάλεια). It was also called Limen Phidalias or bay of Phidalia (κόλπος Φειδαλίας). Pliny the Elder records that beyond the Bosporus lay the Gulf of Lasthenes (which he calls Casthenes, but Lasthenes or Leosthenes is the correct form) and two harbors, one called the "Old Men's Harbour" and the other the "Women's Harbour".

According to one tradition, Phidaleia, the wife of Byzas (the legendary founder of Byzantium), together with a group of women, repelled an attack led by Stroibos, Byzas's brother, who had assaulted the city while its male citizens were away. After defeating the attackers, Phidaleia chased them as far as the harbor, which was thereafter named in commemoration of this event. An inhabitant of this harbor district was known as Gynaikolimenites (Γυναικολιμενίτης).

Dionysius of Byzantium gives another explanation for the name "Harbor of Women". He writes that it was called this either because it was safe from both the waves of the sea and the winds on land, or because when the men were absent, women caught a great mass of fish that entered the port. He also adds that adjoining the harbor was a place called Kyparodes (Κυπαρώδης), named after a cypress tree.

During his return from Persia after recovering the True Cross, Emperor Heraclius crossed the Bosporus Strait with the help of boats organized by the prefect and landed at the bay of Phidalia, from where he proceeded to Constantinople.

Gyllius (mid-16th century) called it "...sinum Phidaliae, et portum mulierum..." (bay of Phidalia and harbor of women). The Greeks of that time also called it Sarantacopa, "the bridge of forty arches", a name derived from a bridge resting on forty beams that functioned as piers.

The place is the modern Baltalimanı.
