= Chelae (disambiguation) =

Chelae is the plural of Chela (organ).

Chelae or Chelai may also refer to:

- Chelae (Bithynia), an ancient town of Bithynia
- Chelae (Bosphorus), an ancient town of Bithynia
- Chelae (Thrace), an ancient town of Thrace
