= Semystra =

Ancient Greek city in Thrace

Coordinates: 41°03′55″N 28°56′43″E

Semystra (Ancient Greek: Σημύστρα, romanized: Sēmústra) or Semestra was a nymph in Greek mythology who was associated with foundational legends of the city of Byzantium (present-day Istanbul). There was a sanctuary of the same name dedicated to her near the city, at the head of the Golden Horn, at the confluence of the rivers Kydaros and Barbyses.

== Mythology ==
Semystra nurtured Keroessa, daughter of Io and Zeus. Keroessa's mother gave birth at Semystra's altar and left the baby there in order to protect her from Hera. Semystra found the infant and raised her.

According to a legend, Semystra was the mother of Byzas, the eponymous founder of Byzantium. According to a different legend related by Dionysius of Byzantium, the Greek colonists initially planned to found their new city at the site of Semystra, but during sacrifices a crow snatched one of the bones from altar and carried it to the Bosporion promontory, showing the way to the site where Byzantium was ultimately built.
