= Messeis =

In Greek mythology, Messeis was one of the Inachides nymphs and sister of Amymone, Io and Hyperia. She was the naiad nymph of a spring and was related to the town Argos in Peloponnese.
