= Bous =

Bous can refer to:

- Bous (Bithynia), a town of ancient Bithynia, now in Turkey
- Bous, Luxembourg, a municipality in Luxembourg
- Bous, Germany, a municipality in Saarland, Germany
- Váli (son of Odin), a figure in Norse mythology also known as "Bous"
