= Vyzas =

Vyzas may refer to:

- Vyzas F.C., Greek football team
- Byzas or Vyzas (Ancient Greek: Βύζας, Býzas, modern pronunciation Výzas), was the eponymous founder of Byzantium
