= Phidalia Petra =

Town of ancient Thrace

Coordinates: 41°05′58″N 29°03′03″E

Phidalia Petra was a town of ancient Thrace, inhabited during Roman and Byzantine times.

Its site is located at Baltalimanı in European Turkey.
