= Mycene (mythology) =

Greek mythical character

In Greek mythology, Mycene (Ancient Greek: Μυκήνη, romanized: Mykene), was a daughter of Inachus, king of Argos and wife of Arestor. Mycene was said to be the eponym of Mycenae.

== Mythology ==
Homer's Odyssey, calling her "Mycene of the fair crown" mentions her in passing, along with Tyro and Alcmene, as "women of old ... fair-tressed Achaean women". Pausanias, citing the Megalai Ehoiai, says that Mycene was the daughter of Inachus and the wife of Arestor, without naming the mother. However, a scholiast on Homer's Odyssey says that Mycene was the daughter of Inachus and the Oceanid nymph Melia, and that, according to the Epic Cycle, Mycene and Arestor were the parents of Argus Panoptes. As the daughter of Inachus, she would have been therefore the sister of Phoroneus, who, according to Argive tradition, was the first man, or first inhabitant of Argos, who lived during the time of the Great Flood, associated with Deucalion.

According to Pausanias—among several accounts of how the city Mycenae got its name—one was that Mycene gave "her name to the city".

== General and cited references ==
- Fowler, R. L. (2013), Early Greek Mythography: Volume 2: Commentary, Oxford University Press, 2013. ISBN 978-0198147411.
- Gantz, Timothy, Early Greek Myth: A Guide to Literary and Artistic Sources, Johns Hopkins University Press, 1996, Two volumes: ISBN 978-0-8018-5360-9 (Vol. 1), ISBN 978-0-8018-5362-3 (Vol. 2).
- Hard, Robin, The Routledge Handbook of Greek Mythology: Based on H.J. Rose's "Handbook of Greek Mythology", Psychology Press, 2004, ISBN 978-0-415-18636-0.
- Homer, The Odyssey with an English Translation by A.T. Murray, PH.D. in two volumes. Cambridge, MA., Harvard University Press; London, William Heinemann, Ltd. 1919. Online version at the Perseus Digital Library.
- Most, G.W., Hesiod: The Shield, Catalogue of Women, Other Fragments, Loeb Classical Library, No. 503, Cambridge, Massachusetts, Harvard University Press, 2007, 2018. ISBN 978-0-674-99721-9. Online version at Harvard University Press.
- Pausanias, Pausanias Description of Greece with an English Translation by W.H.S. Jones, Litt.D., and H.A. Ormerod, M.A., in 4 Volumes. Cambridge, MA, Harvard University Press; London, William Heinemann Ltd. 1918. Online version at the Perseus Digital Library.
- Tripp, Edward, Crowell's Handbook of Classical Mythology, Thomas Y. Crowell Co; First edition (June 1970). ISBN 069022608X.
- West, M. L., Greek Epic Fragments: From the Seventh to the Fifth Centuries BC. Edited and translated by Martin L. West. Loeb Classical Library No. 497. Cambridge, Massachusetts: Harvard University Press, 2003. Online version at Harvard University Press.
- Smith, William; Dictionary of Greek and Roman Biography and Mythology, London (1867). Online version at the Perseus Digital Library
