= Chelae (Bosphorus) =

Coastal town of ancient Bithynia

Coordinates: 41°11′13″N 29°07′11″E

Chelae or Chelai or Chele (Ancient Greek: Χῆλαι or Χήλη) was a coastal town of ancient Bithynia located on the Bosphorus.

Dionysius of Byzantium wrote that the place was called Chelae, meaning "claws" in Greek (Χῆλαι, plural; Χήλη, singular), because of its shape.

Niketas Choniates wrote that Andronikos I Komnenos seized Alexios Komnenos, blinded him and banished him to Chele, which he described as "a coastal fortress situated at the mouth of the Pontos" where a tower had been built for his confinement. Years later, as rebellion spread through Constantinople and Andronikos himself was driven from power, he fled the capital by ship with a few attendants, hoping to escape toward the land of the Tauro-Scythians. He came once again to Chele, but although the inhabitants saw that he no longer wore the imperial insignia, they feared him too greatly to arrest him and instead prepared a ship for his departure. Violent storms, however, repeatedly drove the vessel back to shore and prevented his escape. At last Andronikos was captured at Chele, bound, and carried back to Constantinople.

Its site is located near Keçili Liman in Asiatic Turkey.
