= Ceroessa =

In Greek mythology, Ceroessa (Ancient Greek: Κερόεσσα, romanized: Keróessa, lit. 'the horned') was a heroine of the foundational myth of Byzantium. She was the daughter of Io and Zeus; elder sister of Epaphus; and mother of Byzas, founder of Byzantium, with her uncle, Poseidon. Creusa was Keroessa's misnomer in the Etymologicum Magnum.

== Mythology ==
According to the historian Hesychius of Miletus, as Io, changed into a heifer and being chased by a gadfly on behalf of the jealous Hera, was passing through Thrace, she gave birth to a girl, Keroessa, on the banks of the Golden Horn, by the altar of the nymph Semystra. According to legend, Keroessa's birthplace is called Semystra (today EyüpSultan district), where the rivers Kydaros (today Alibey Stream) and Barbyses (today Kağıthane Stream) flow into the sea at the end of Chrysokeras (Golden Horn or Haliç). Semystra takes its name from the Semystra Altar, where today Eyyub El Ensari's tomb is located, and its water is believed to have healing powers but according to Swiss scholar Ernest Mamboury's notebook he thinks “Altar of Semystra" was Alibeyköy, Silahtaraga neighborhood in EyüpSultan district. Keroessa was reared by Semystra and grew up surpassing other local maidens in beauty. She had intercourse with Poseidon and in due course gave birth to a son, whom she named Byzas. He became the founder of Byzantium (today Sarayburnu, where Topkapı Palace was built) and named the Golden Horn (Greek Χρυσόκερας) after his mother. Ceroessa also had another son named Strombos. Strombos fought with his brother and the Byzantines.

According to Nonnus, Keroessa's birthplace was the same as that of her brother Epaphus, i. e. Egypt.
