= Agreus (mythology) =

Character in Greek mythology

In Greek mythology Agreus (Ancient Greek: Ἀγρεύς means 'hunter' or 'wild') or Argeus (Ἀργεύς) was the name of several characters:

- Agreus, one of the Pans, son of Hermes and Sose.
- Agreus, son of Apollo and Euboea, daughter of Macareus. He was the lord of Diphys in Euboea, or king of the entire island.
- Agreus, a warrior from Epidaurus, and one of the army of the Seven against Thebes.
- Agreus, a warrior from Calydon, also one of the army of the Seven against Thebes. He cut the right arm of Phegeus, the Theban.
- Agreus, a warrior from Pylos, yet another of the army of the Seven against Thebes. He was killed by Menoeceus, son of Creon.
- Agreus, another name for Aristaeus, son of Apollo and Cyrene. Also called Nomios.
