= Phegeus =

Set of mythological characters

In Greek mythology, Phegeus (Ancient Greek: Φηγεύς, romanized: Phêgeus, lit. 'oak' or 'pertaining to the beech/ oak tree') was the name of the following characters:

- Phegeus, another name for Aegialeus, son of Inachus and the nymph Melia, who received part of the territories of Argos ruled by his father. On the death of his brother, Phoroneus, Phegeus built a temple at the tomb where the former was worshipped as a deity and oxen were sacrificed to him.
- Phegeus, king of Psophis.
- Phegeus, was one of the Thebans who ambushed Tydeus during the war of the Seven against Thebes. Like others participating in this ambush he was killed by Tydeus.
- Phegeus, a defender of Thebes in the war of the Seven against Thebes. He was killed by Agreus_{.}
- Phegeus, an Athenian messenger whom Theseus sent to Creon with a threat of war against Thebes, if Creon would not let the bodies of those who had died attacking Thebes in the war of the Seven against Thebes be burned.
- Phegeus, son of Dares, priest of Hephaestus at Troy. He was the brother of Idaeus and was killed by Diomedes during the Trojan War.
- Phegeus, one of Aeneas' companions in Italy. He was killed by Turnus, the man who opposed Aeneas in Italy.
- Phegeus, soldier in the army of Aeneas. He was killed by Turnus, the man who opposed Aeneas in Italy.
