= Melia (consort of Inachus) =

Greek mythological figure

In Greek mythology, Melia or Melie (Ancient Greek: Μελία or Μελίη, romanized: Meliê, lit. 'ash-tree') was an Oceanid, one of the 3,000 water nymph daughters of the Titans Oceanus and his sister-spouse Tethys. She was the mother of culture hero Phoroneus, and Aegialeus (or Phegeus), by her brother Inachus, the river-god of Argos. However, in some accounts, Inachus fathered Phoroneus by an Oceanid nymph named Argia. According to Argive tradition, Phoroneus was the first man, or first inhabitant of Argos, who lived during the time of the Great Flood, associated with Deucalion.

Melia was also said to have been the mother, by Inachus, of Mycene, the wife of Arestor, and eponym of Mycenae. Melia was also perhaps considered to be the mother, by Inachus, of Io, the ancestress, by Zeus, of the Greek dynasties of Argos, Thebes, and Crete.

The consort of Apollo, who was an important cult figure at Thebes, was also said to be a daughter of Oceanus named Melia.
