= Treaty of Balta Liman =

1838 treaty between the Ottoman Empire and England

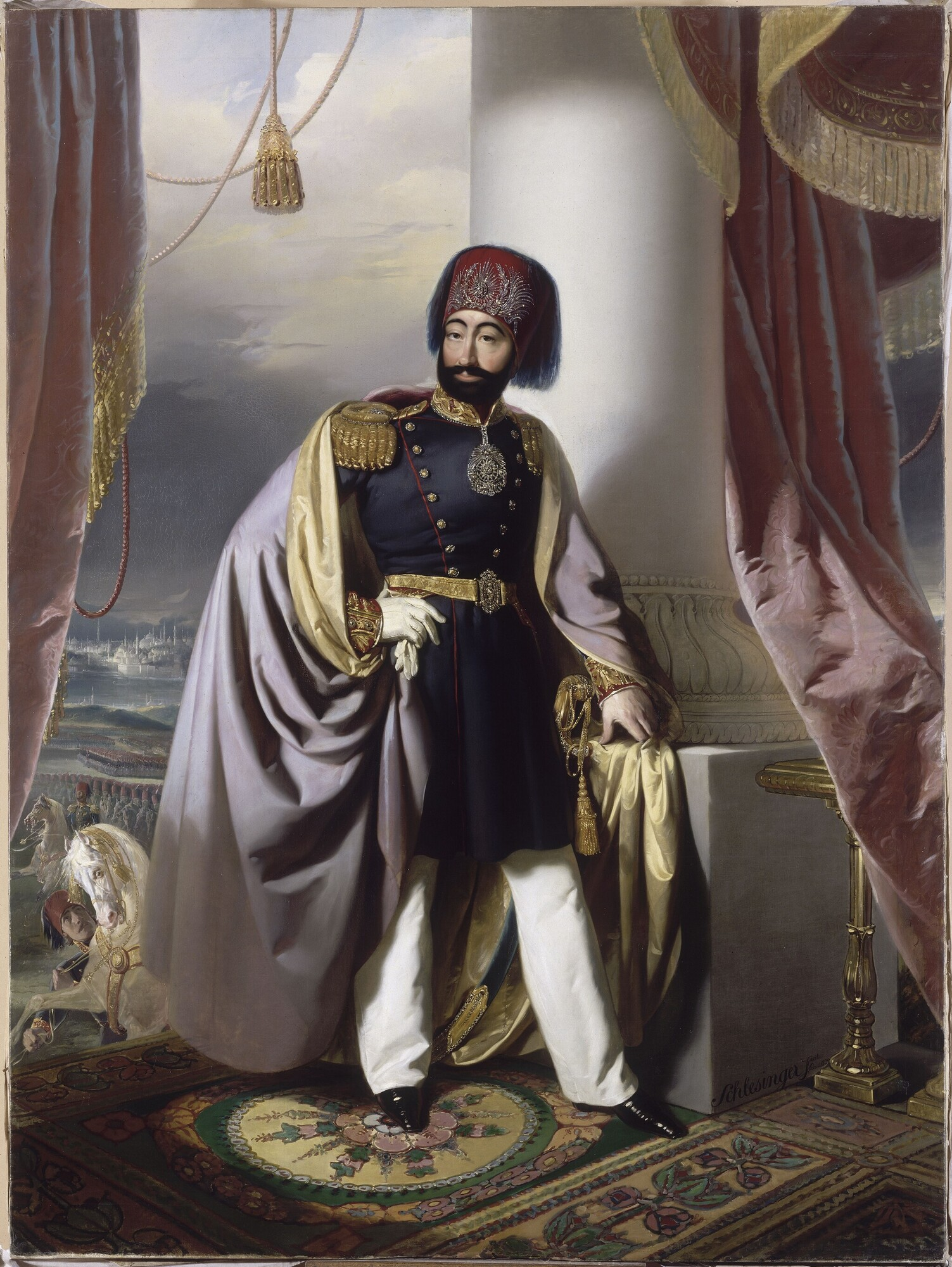
Mahmud II after his clothing reform in 1826

The 1838 Treaty of Balta Liman, or the Anglo-Ottoman Treaty, was a formal trade agreement signed between the Sublime Porte of the Ottoman Empire and Great Britain. The trade policies imposed upon the Ottoman Empire, after the Treaty of Balta Liman, were some of the most liberal, open market settlements that had ever been enacted. The terms of the treaty stated that the Ottoman Empire would abolish all monopolies and allow British merchants and their collaborators to have full access to all Ottoman markets and be taxed equally to local merchants. These agreements did not constitute an equal free trade arrangement, as Britain still employed protectionist policies on their agricultural markets.

Leading up to the Treaty of Balta Liman, in autumn 1831, the Governor of Egypt, Mehmed Ali, retaliated against the Ottoman Empire. Mehmed Ali had not been given the territory that the Ottoman Sultan Mahmud II had promised him after he provided military expertise in defeating Greek rebels in 1824. In response, Mehmed Ali's son, Ibrahim Pasha, led the Egyptian army to storm Lebanon and Syria, quickly defeating Ottoman forces. Mahmud II appealed to Britain and France for help, but neither would intervene. The Empire reluctantly turned to Russia for help, which in turn stopped Mehmed Ali's advancements. After a round of negotiations, Egypt was able to retain most of the conquered land, though neither party was truly satisfied with the outcome. Tensions between Egypt and the Ottoman Empire, along with fears of Russian intervention, gave London an opportunity and the incentive to negotiate with Constantinople. Britain took advantage of the unrest and offered its hand in helping the Ottoman Empire defeat Mehmed Ali Pasha, in exchange for complete access to Ottoman trade markets.

== Background ==
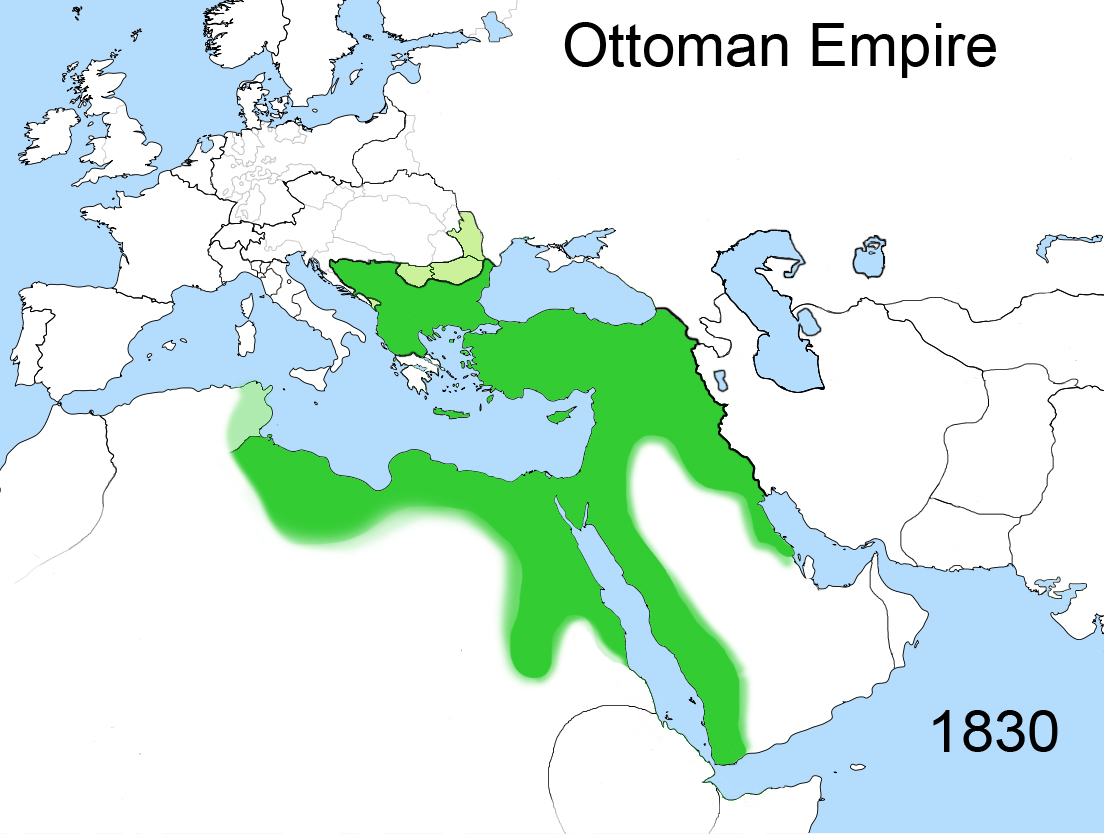
Territorial changes of the Ottoman Empire 1830

=== Rise of Muhammad Ali Pasha ===
Between the years 1803 and 1807 civil war broke out in Egypt among the Ottoman Turks, Egyptian Mamluks, and Albanian mercenaries. Mehmed Ali Pasha emerged victorious from the battle. Egypt was still under Ottoman control, so when Sultan Mahmud II recognized him as the official Egyptian Governor, his rule was legitimized. During his reign, Mehmed Ali Pasha gained much recognition for industrial and economic reforms in Egypt. Irrigation systems were repaired which led to a booming cotton industry. His administration also tackled important infrastructure issues, including the construction of the Mahmoudiya Canal, which allowed water access to the port of Alexandria from the Nile River. Mehmed Ali's economic policies relied heavily on the use of monopolies to control market prices of goods. During his reign, Mehmed Ali gained considerable favor in the European world, specifically with France, due to his westernized reforms. He promoted education reform, specifically in the fields of arts and sciences. Also, with much European benefit, Mehmed Ali strengthened trade from India to the western nations; though, still capitalized on middle-man transactions.

Mehmed Ali was nominally loyal to the Ottoman Empire and led an invasion against the Saudis in 1811 at the request of the Sultan. While abroad he became suspicious that the Ottomans were planning to overthrow his rule in Egypt, so he returned to Cairo. Mehmed Ali was prone to act autonomously and made important decisions without first gaining approval from the authorities of the Ottoman Empire. During the time under Mahmud II, reformist efforts were being made to centralize the government and punish peripheral states which acted outside the Porte's will. However, Egypt amassed so much regional power that the Sultan could not take any simple measures to cut back Mehmed Ali's power.

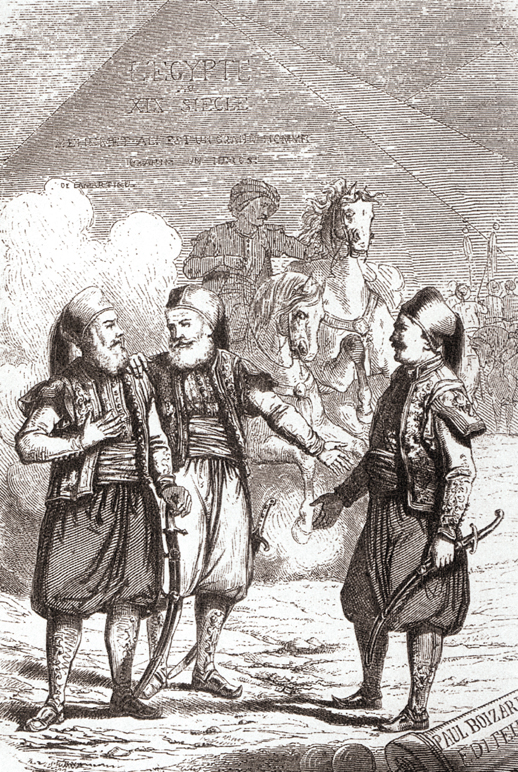
Muhammad Ali Pasha with his son, Ibrahim, and Colonel Joseph Sève (later Suleiman Pasha)

Mehmed Ali was well aware of Mahmud's efforts to cut back regional power and had always been suspicious of the rule of the Sultan. In precautionary steps, the Egyptian Governor had been building up his army and naval fleets with the help of French instructors. With his well-trained army, Mehmed Ali was able to suppress a revolt of Albanian troops in Cairo. Mahmud II acknowledged the skills of Mehmed Ali's army and offered him the pashaliks of Syria and Morea (which was the name for the Peloponnese peninsula of Greece), in return for aid in suppressing Greek revolts. Mehmed Ali and his son Ibrahim agreed and led a fierce campaign in the Mediterranean Sea, which began in 1824.

After a few years of fighting, Mehmed Ali was never granted the land promised to Egypt after helping aid Ottoman efforts to end the Greek rebellion. At this point, Ali Pasha knew his army was superior to the Ottoman's army and he was angry with Mahmud for denying him the promised territory. He had a growing ship industry and needed more natural resources in order to meet demand, and he felt the Ottomans would soon attempt to exert their power over him. These factors led Mehemet Ali to storm the Ottoman territories. In 1831 he sent troops through Lebanon and up to Syria along the shores of the Mediterranean; and conquered Ottoman lands all the way to Konia, which is in the heart of Anatolia. Sultan Mahmud II quickly realized that he would need an ally in order to defend himself against the forces of Mehemet Ali. First, he turned to Britain and France for support, though he was promptly turned down. The Ottoman Empire had no other choice than to seek the help of a known enemy, Russia.

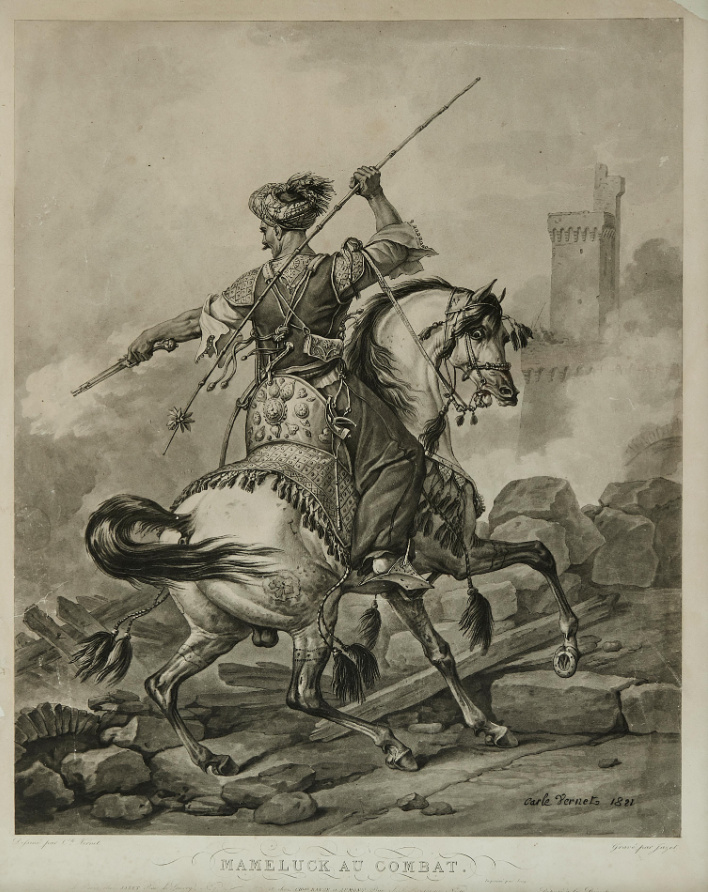
Mamluk cavalryman

=== The Hunkar Iskelesi Treaty of August 1833 ===
Russian Czar Nicolas I, agreed to help Mahmud and immediately sent troops to stop Egypt's advance into Anatolia. It was not an easy move to make on Mahmud's part; public unrest ensued after forming an alliance with Russia. Many were disturbed by the alliance considering that just a few years before, the Ottoman Empire lost land in the Balkans to Russian encroachments.

The looming Russian force encouraged negotiations between the Sublime Porte and Egypt in the spring of 1833. Ultimately, Mehemet Ali came out of the peace negotiations – agreed upon at the Convention of Kütahya – with all of Egypt, Syria, Jeddah, Crete, Adana and Sudan. He was also promised that his sons could keep his lineage alive as rulers of Egypt, indefinitely. On the other hand, as payment for Russian support, the Ottoman Empire had to agree to close the Dardanelles, the passage between the Sea of Marmara and the Mediterranean, to warships if Russia was ever attacked.

The British and the French were not happy with the Hunkar Iskelesi Treaty. The French had all along quietly been backing the reign of Mehemet Ali in Egypt and would have been happy to see the Ottoman Empire crumble. France had taken an interest in North Africa and seized Algeria from weak Ottoman rule, just prior to the treaty. France also had strong diplomatic ties with Mehmed Ali Pasha. The British now feared Russia's growing influence over the Ottoman Empire. The UK could not permit Russia to take over the Ottoman Empire, because that expansion would pose as a major threat to Western Europe. After the Hunkar Iskelesi treaty, England considered the survival of the Ottoman Empire a worthwhile cause.

French and British diplomats were even more alarmed at Russia's involvement in the Ottoman Empire when the Munchengratz Agreement was signed in 1833. The Munchengratz Agreement was authorized by Prussia, Austria and Russia; and it stated that each power would stand alongside one another in any future decisions, especially any decisions concerning the state of the Ottoman Empire. This agreement did not state any new treaties, though it made a public display of the powers' unity on issues concerning the Ottoman Empire, which appeared to be in its final decline.

=== Timeline of events ===
- 1830- The Ottomans lose the war to the Greeks; Greece gains independence from the Ottoman Empire.
- 1830- The French seize Algeria from the Ottoman Empire and begin to colonize Northern Africa.
- 1833- The Hunkar Iskelesi Treaty defensively align Russia and the Ottoman Empire. The Munchengratz Agreement publicly reasserts Russian, Austrian and Prussian unity. The Convention of Kütahya ends war between Ottoman and Egyptian forces, and grants Egypt land won during battle.
- 1833- The revolt of Muhammad Pasha of Rawanduz begins to take great share of threat towards the Porte, Indeed in 1813 he will launch his revolt against the Ottomans, he will first increase his influence then will launched into his conquest further north taking Jazira, Diyarbakır, Mardin and Nuseinbin, This will trigger a craze among the Ottomans.
- 1834- Mehmet Ali Pasha, now in control of Syria, experiences troubles. The Syrians had once welcomed the Egyptian Governor, championing him as the "pioneer of European civilization in the east"; nevertheless, the Syrian economy is hurt under the monopoly policies of his regime. Syrians revolt against Ali Pasha, but are quickly defeated and terrorized shortly after.
- 1834- Trade Capitulations between the Ottoman Empire and the Britain expire after 14 years. After taking into account the increases of international prices, customs duties would have to be raised to make up for inflation. The UK is unwilling to renew the agreement with raised customs duties. The Secretary at the British Embassy in Constantinople, David Urquhart, begins to draft a new trade agreement.
- 1835- British diplomats attempt to work with Ali Pasha, in the hopes of building more trade infrastructure throughout new Egyptian territories. At the request of Lord Palmerston, England wants to build rail lines connecting the Syrian coast to the Euphrates and on to the Persian Gulf. Mehmet Ali denies this request, as well as a less extravagant one for another rail line.
- 1838- The Treaty of Balta Liman is signed by the Britain and the Ottoman Empire. The relations between the Sultan and Egypt are extremely volatile. The Treaty would thwart Russian power over the Ottoman Empire and benefit British producers significantly. Though the Ottomans would gain slightly from increased trade, the main incentive is to bring down Mehmed Ali by abolishing monopolies, Egypt's primary source of income.

=== Intended outcomes of the treaty ===
In 1820 the U.K. and the Ottoman Empire had established a Trade Tariff that would expire in 14 years. After 1834 neither party wanted to renew the original agreement as it stood; so, Reşit Pasha (advisor to the Sultan), David Urquhart (an English diplomat), Lord Posonby (the British Ambassador) and Counsel General John Cartwright, worked to form the Treaty of Balta Liman. David Urquhart was sent to Istanbul to befriend Reşit Pasha and convince him the treaty would be of benefit to the Ottoman State. Urquhart worked hard to convince Ottoman notables that the treaty was in their favor. He published articles in Istanbul's newspapers, listing the benefits of free trade markets; his propaganda influenced the capital city deeply. France and Russia watched the negotiations of the treaty closely. Russia feared losing its newfound Ottoman interests, and the French may have had to consider switching sides if Britain aligned itself with the Sultan against Mehmed Ali Pasha of Egypt.

'British Aims:' The UK was leading the world in the industrial revolution and needed a bigger market and more resources in order to expand. So, it would benefit England the most to engage in as much trade with the Ottoman Empire as possible, with very little restrictions on the open market. Further, the British wanted the Ottomans to accept the treaty as quickly as possible. England needed to strike the deal while the Ottoman Empire was in a tight spot with Egypt so it would have less room to negotiate. England had to convince Mahmud II that the treaty would end Mehmed Ali's reign. Egypt's economy was largely controlled through the use of monopolies; if monopolies were abolished, Egypt's economy would crumble. Also, opening Egyptian markets, with no protections, to the UK's industrial goods market would crush its infant industries. England did not want to see the Ottoman Empire fall into the hands of Russia either. Russia would not engage in free trade with Britain, and there would be no benefits of market inequalities that would form between the Ottoman Empire and England after the treaty.

The balance of trade up until the mid 19th century was in favour of the Ottoman Empire which, in the years 1820–22, exported goods worth £650,000 to Britain. By 1836–38, that figure had reached £1,729,000. Given that the majority of the share of trade was made by Ottoman merchants, the Europeans, especially the British and the French, became irritated and unhappy with this trade arrangement and pushed for intervention and transformation of the economic policies of the Middle East. Indeed, the French foreign ambassador posted a letter to Louis-Mathieu, Comte de Mole in 1837 stating:

I realized with pleasure that for our merchants the main question was not so much the amount of the new duties as their equality and stability. For what our merchants are requesting is, as far as possible, the abolition of monopolies and prohibitions that have diverted almost the whole export trade into the hands of a small number of favored Barataries.

'Ottoman Aims:' The Ottoman Empire was offered a deal that would have been hard to resist. Mahmud was never happy with the 1833 land negotiations, and wanted to see Egypt crumble. Tensions between Egypt and the Ottoman Empire clearly suggested the possibility of war. With new British alliances, fostered through the treaty's economic policy, Mahmud should receive help in ending the Mehmed Ali Pasha regime before the Empire was destroyed. Also, the Ottoman Porte may have been overly naive to the full implications of a liberal, free trade, market. Without infant industry protections the Ottoman Empire had little hope in becoming a fully industrialized economy, as the other world powers were. England was not offering to also freely open its markets up to the Ottoman Empire, so markets could never come to a true equilibrium. It is unclear whether the Porte would have understood these consequences due to the concerted efforts of British diplomats lobbying for the policies in the treaty.

== The Terms of the Treaty ==
The Treaty of Balta Liman was a commercial treaty signed in 1838 between the Ottoman Empire and Great Britain, regulating international trade. Duties were set at 3% on imports; 3% on exports; 9% on transiting exported goods; and 2% on transiting imported goods. Given the tradition of the "Most Favored Country Status," these conditions were extended to France. The Ottomans also agreed to the abolition of all monopolies. Factors that helped shape the treaty included the writings of David Urquhart, who had advocated for the abolition of monopolies (of which opium was the most prominent outside of Egypt) in order to bolster further trade with the Ottoman Empire and decrease British dependency on Russian raw materials. There were also numerous complaints by British businessmen who were subject to duties levied on goods transshipped across the Ottoman Empire and arbitrary levies by local pashas. These duties were mainly confined to the realm of exports, while imports could be traded at ports for the traditional rate of 3%. Turkish historian Candan Badem writes: "The Ottomans levied 3% custom duty on imports and 12% on exports, doing exactly the opposite of other states to protect their industries and their domestic markets".

=== Convention of Commerce, 1838, Balta Liman ===
- Article 1. All rights privileges, and immunities which have been conferred on the subjects or ships of Great Britain by the existing Capitulations and Treaties, are confirmed now and for ever, except in as far as they may be specifically altered by the present Convention: and it is moreover expressly stipulated, that all rights, privileges, or immunities which the Sublime Porte now grants, or may here after grant, to the ships and subjects of any other foreign Power, or which it may suffer the ships and subjects of any other foreign Power, or which it may suffer the ships and subject of any other foreign Power to enjoy, shall be equally granted to, and exercised and enjoyed by, the subjects and ships of Great Britain.
- Article 2. The subject of Her Britannic Majesty, or their agents, shall be permitted to purchase, at all places in the Ottoman Dominions (whether for the purposes of internal trade or exportation), all articles, without any exception whatsoever, the produce, growth, or manufacture of the said Dominions; and the Sublime Porte formally engages to abolish all monopolies of agricultural produce, or of any other articles whatsoever, as well as all Permits from the local Governors, either for the purchase of any article, or for its removal from one place to another when purchased; and any attempt to compels the subjects of Her Britannic Majesty to receive such Permits from the local Governors, shall be considered as an infraction of Treaties, and the Sublime Porte shall immediately punish with severity and Viziers and other Officers who shall have been guilty of such misconduct, and render full justice to British subject for all injuries or losses which they may duly prove themselves to have suffered.
- Article 3. If any article of Turkish produce, growth, or manufacture, be purchased by the British Merchant or his agent for the purpose of selling the same for internal consumption in Turkey, the British merchant or his agent shall pay, at the purchase and sale of such articles, and in any manner of trade therein, the same duties that are paid, in similar circumstances, by the most favored class of Turkish subject engaged in the internal trade of Turkey, whether Mussulmans [Muslims] or Rayas.
- Article 4. If any article of Turkish produce, growth, or manufacture, be purchased for exportation the same shall be conveyed by the British Merchant or his agent, free of any kind of charge or duty whatsoever, to a convenient place of shipment, on its entry into which it shall be liable to one fixed duty of nine per cent, ad valorem, in lieu of all other interior duties.

Subsequently, on exportation, the duty of three per cent, as established and existing at present, shall be paid. But all articles bought in the shipping ports for exportation, and which have already paid the interior duty at entering into the same, will only pay the three per cent, export duty.

- Article 5. The regulations under which Firmans are issued to British Merchant vessels for passing the Dardanelles and the Bosphorus shall be so framed as to occasion to such vessels the least possible delay.
- Article 6. It is agreed by the Turkish Government, that the Regulations established in the present Convention shall be general throughout the Turkish Empire, whether in Turkey in Europe or Turkey, in Asia, In Egypt, or other African possessions belonging to the Sublime Porte, and shall be applicable to all the subjects, whatever their description, of the Ottoman Dominions; and the Turkish Government also agree not to object to other foreign Powers settling their trade upon the basis of this present Convention.
- Article 7. It having been the custom of Great Britain and the Sublime Porte, with a view to prevent all difficulties and delay in estimating the value of articles imported into the Turkish Dominions, or exported therefrom, by British subjects, to appoint, at intervals of fourteen years, a Commission of men well acquainted with the traffic of both countries, who have fixed by a Tariff the sum of Money in the coin of the Grand Signor, which should be paid as duty on each article; and the term of fourteen years, during which the last adjustment of the said Tariff was to remain in force, having expired, the High Contracting Parties have agreed to name, conjointly, fresh Commissioners to fix and determine the amount in Money which is to be paid by British subjects, as the duty of three per cent, upon the value of all commodities imported and exported by them; and said Commissioners shall establish an equitable arrangement for estimating the interior duties which, by the present Treaty, are established on Turkish goods to be exported, and shall also determine on the places of shipment, where it may be most convenient that such duties should be levied.

The new Tariff thus established, to be enforce seven years after it has been fixed, at the end of which time it shall be in the power of either of the parties to demand a revision of that Tariff; but if no such demand be made on either side, within the six months after the end of the first seven years, then the Tariff shall remain in force for seven years more, reckoned from the end of the preceding seven years, and so it shall be at the end of each successive period of seven years.

- Article 8. The Present Convention shell be ratified, and the ratifications shall be exchanged at Constantinople within space of four months.

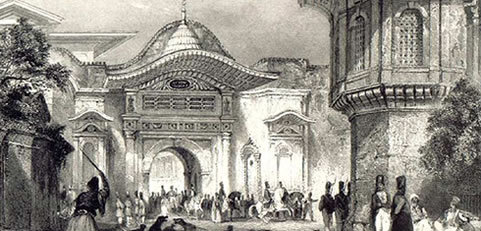
The Sublime Porte in Ottoman times.

One factor that helped the British push the treaty through was the military dispute between rogue Ottoman Governor Mehmed (also known as Muhammed or Mehmed) Ali of Egypt and the Ottoman Imperial Center that dated back to 1831. In 1831, Mehmed Ali's son Ibrahim Pasha led a successful military expedition into Syria, and established himself as governor. This invasion led to Ottoman retaliation and the eruption of hostilities that culminated in 1833, at which point Ibrahim's troops were within striking distance of Istanbul. Russian intervention, however, ended Ibrahim's advance. In spite of this, Mehmed Ali continued to govern Syria, and in May 1838 informed both British and French Consulates of that he resolved to declare independence from the Ottoman Empire. This move was opposed by both the Great Powers and the Ottoman Empire, which, under Mahmud II, began preparing for military action to prevent secession. In the midst of this dispute, on 16 August 1838, the Treaty of Balta Liman was passed. While there was no clear quid pro quo agreement, the treaty's passage helped to ensure British support of Ottoman territorial integrity, a position which had in actuality already been held by Palmerston, the Secretary of Foreign Affairs, but was formally declared the following month. When Muhammad Ali refused to implement the agreement because of the threat this posed to his nascent industrialisation project, Sultan Mahmud II gave him a year's grace period, after which Muhammad Ali still refused to comply. Based on the terms of the 1840 Convention of London, the Ottomans, with British assistance, soon attacked and reasserted control over Syria. The effects of the treaty are disputed, but many contend that it opened Ottoman markets to increased British imports and was detrimental to Ottoman producers.

== Effects of the treaty ==
The economic effects of the treaty would not be immediately realized in Ottoman markets. Politically however, the Treaty of Balta Liman had serious consequences on the outcome of the Ottoman-Syrian War. After signing the treaty with the British, the Ottomans knew that Britain was heavily invested the future of the Ottoman Empire. With the British on his side, Sultan Mahmud II would no longer passively stand by while Mehemet Ali of Egypt held Ottoman territory in Syria. In 1839, a year after the Treaty of Balta Liman was signed, the Ottoman Empire declared war on Egypt. On 29 June 1839 Ibrahim Pasha, the son of Mehemet Ali, defeated the Ottoman army in the Battle of Nezib. This crushing defeat offered an opportunity for Mehemet Ali Pasha to potentially take control of Constantinople and essentially the entire Ottoman Empire. Shortly after the defeat Mahmud died leaving his 16-year-old heir Abdülmecid in power. Britain, Russia, and Austria all had a considerable stake in the Ottoman Empire, and so they quickly came to the aid of the young Sultan, which led to the 1840 Convention of London.

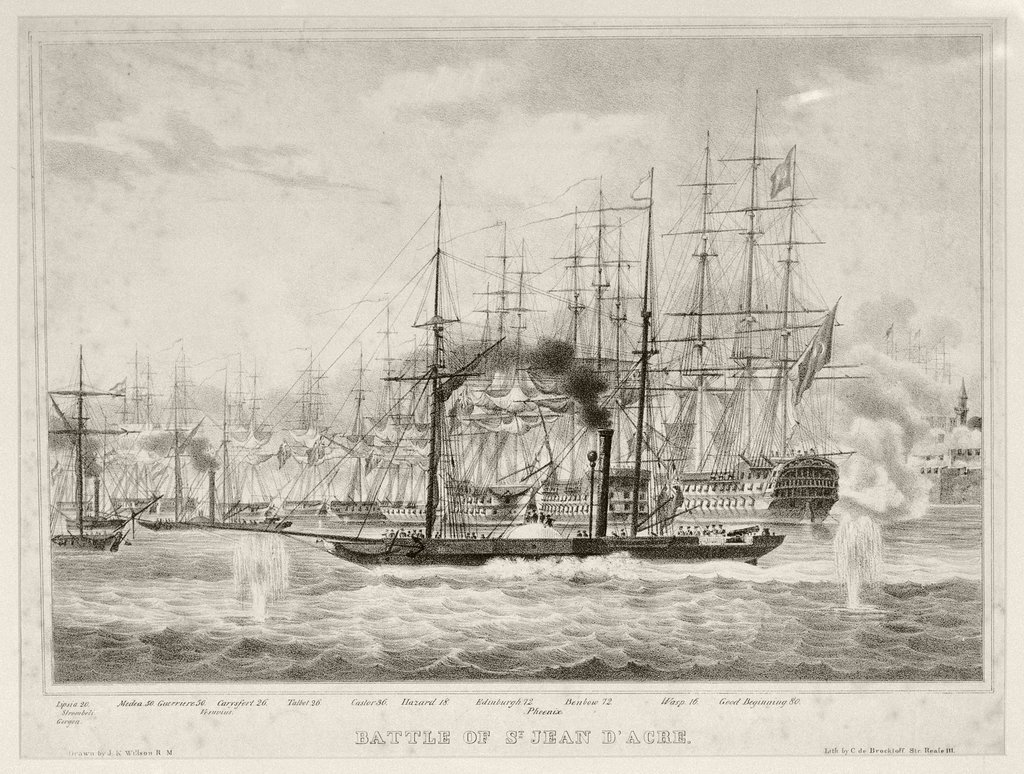
HMS Phoenix in the bombardment of Acre, 1840

=== 1840 Convention of London ===
The Convention of London of 1840 was a treaty with the formal title of Convention for the Pacification of the Levant, signed on 15 July 1840 between the European Great Powers of Great Britain, Austria, Prussia and Russia on the one hand, and the Ottoman Empire on the other. The treaty offered the Egyptians complete rule over Egyptian territories and parts of Sudan as "privileged Ottoman provinces," but they would have to give up captured territories in Syria and Greece. Egypt did not respond to the treaty in the given amount of time because it believed France would back it in further conquest. Muhammad Ali's non-cooperation led to the Oriental Crisis of 1840. Russian and British forces attacked Egyptian forces in Acre and quickly defeated Mehemet Ali's forces. France also did not anticipate entering into war with England. After the crisis France switched sides, and Muhammad Ali realised he would have to accept the offer contained in the treaty.

=== Economic consequences ===
There are no official trade records for the Ottoman Empire before the year 1878, though it is clear that amount of imports and exports rose shortly after the Treaty of Balta Liman. Although the treaty undeniably increased trade, previously-sheltered Ottoman industry declined when exposed to foreign competition, and imports into the country increased more than exports. The rapid influx of cheap British textiles, no protectionist policies, and the lack of a development policy meant that industrialization fell rather than rose in the Ottoman Empire after the Treaty of Balta Liman. An 1866 Ottoman report claimed that the number of textile looms in Istanbul and Uskar fell from a reported 2,730 to only 23. Similarly brocade looms went from a previous 350 to only four, and cotton or "nankeen" looms went from 40,000 to only 5,000 in Aleppo.

== See also ==
- Baltalimanı
- List of treaties

== Sources ==
- James L. Gelvin, The Modern Middle East , Oxford University Press, 2005.
