= Guillaume-Joseph Grelot =

17th-century French Old Masters artist (1630–1680)

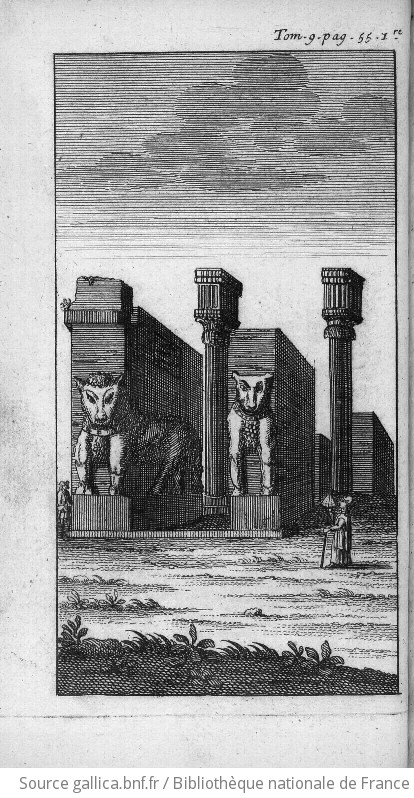
- This 1711 etching shows Grelot (bottom-right) in front of the Gate of Xerxes in Persepolis.

Personal details
- Born: Possibly 1630 Likely Paris, Kingdom of France
- Died: 1680―1683 Likely Paris, Kingdom of France

Guillaume-Joseph Grelot (c. 1630 ― 1680s) was a 17th-century French Old Masters artist. A large majority of his works were dedicated to King Louis XIV. His etchings were based on architecture and ruins he viewed in Constantinople, i.e. Istanbul of the Ottoman Empire. He is said to have continued the works of Pierre Gilles. He published a book of his etchings and travels in 1680.

== Biography ==
Prior to arriving in Constantinople, Grelot traveled with French merchant Jean Chardin, whom he met in Paris, to Persia in 1671.

Grelot's 1680 book confirms that he was alive up until that point. This is the common belief of when he died. This is despite the case that a second edition was published in 1681 that makes no comment on whether he is alive or dead. However, a 1683 English edition by a man known as John Philips mentions in the attestations within the introduction-

"I should be [very unjust], [should] I [refuse Monsieur] Grelot my approbation of [those] excellent delineations which he is now making [public] to the world."

Referring to Grelot in the present tense hints at the fact that he is still alive at the time of publishing. However, this cannot be considered completely certain.

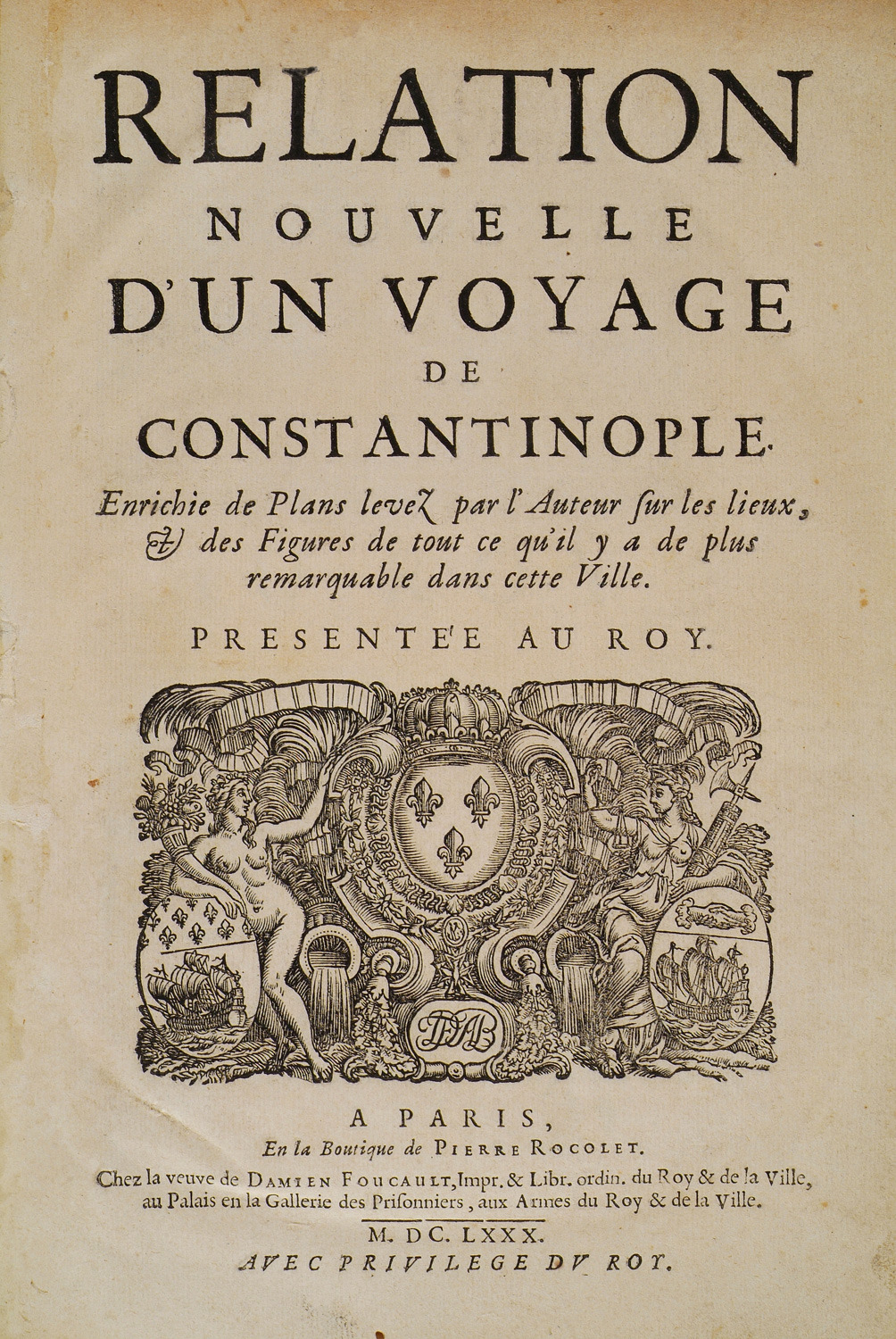
New Report of a Voyage to Constantinople (1680)

== Gallery ==
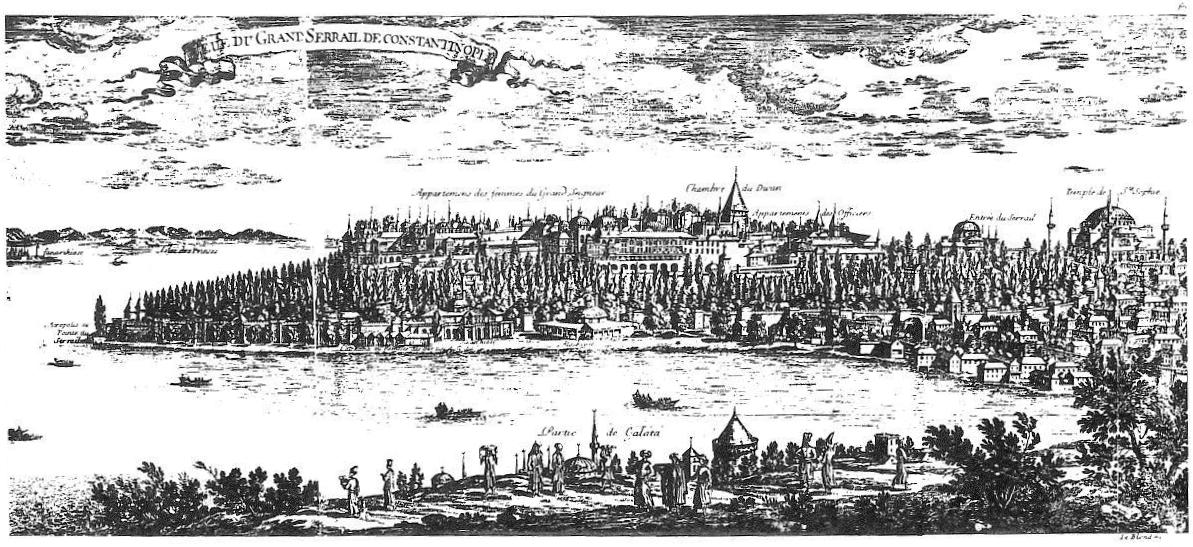
Panoramic view of the Topkapi Palace from the Golden Horn, ca. 1672

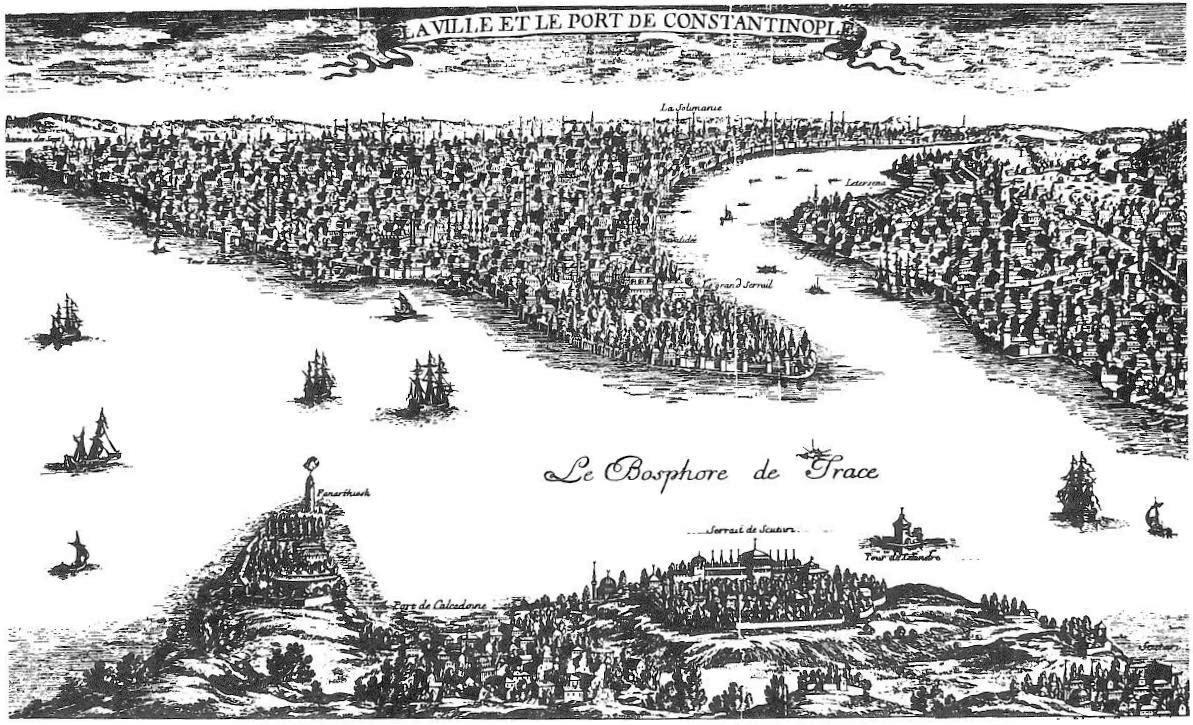
View of Constantinople, with the Topkapi Palace, ca. 1672
