= Inachus =

Character in Greek mythology

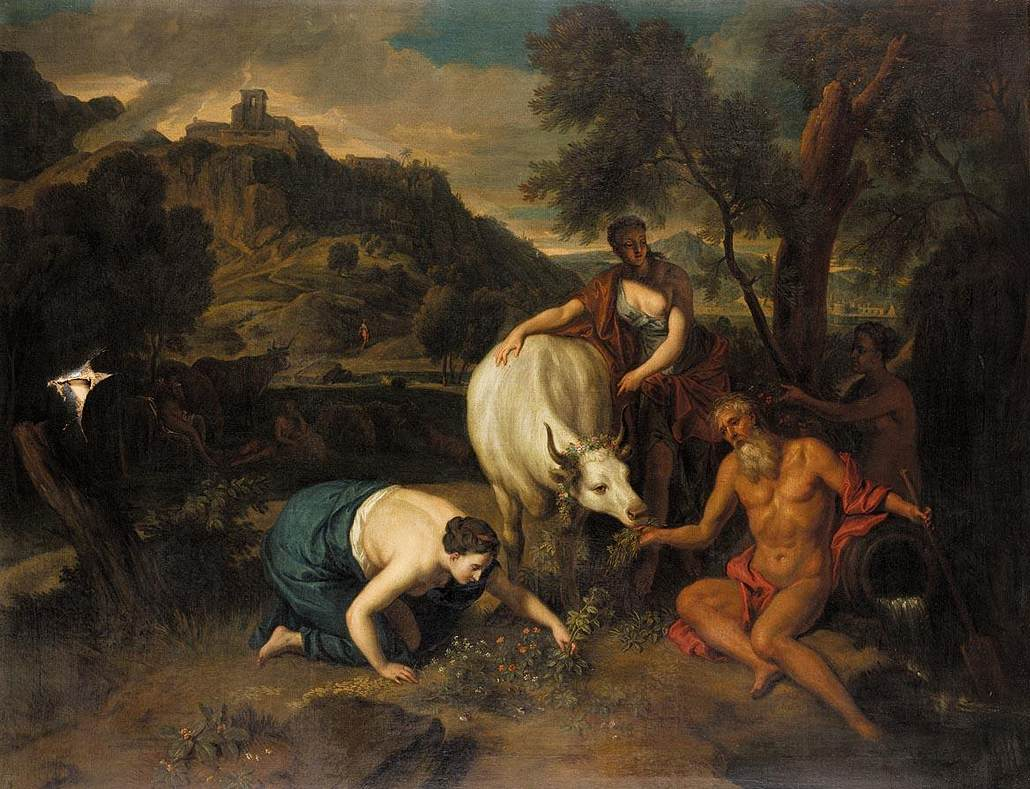
Io recognized by her father (Victor Honoré Janssens)

In Greek mythology, Inachus or Inachos (Ancient Greek: Ἴναχος, romanized: Ínakhos) was the first king of Argos. He was one of the three thousand sons of Oceanus and Tethys. The Inachus River, a river in eastern Peloponnese, is named after him.

== Family ==
Various ancient authors describe Inachus as being one of the river gods born of Titans Oceanus and Tethys, and thus to the Greeks, was part of the pre-Olympian or "Pelasgian" mythic landscape. In Greek iconography, Walter Burkert notes, the rivers are represented in the form of a bull with a human head or face. Although these myths have been passed down since then, one of the most remarkable findings of modern archaeology was the monuments and remains showing that Argos had indeed been an ancient civilization alongside Egypt and Babylonia.

Inachus had many children, the chief of whom were his two sons, Phoroneus and Aegialeus or Phegeus, and his two daughters, Io and Philodice, wife of Leucippus. The mother of these children was variously described in the sources, either an Oceanid named Melia, called the mother of Phoroneus and Aegialeus (or Phegeus), or another Oceanid named Argia, called the mother of Phoroneus and Io. Io is sometimes confused as the daughter of Inachus and Melia but she is the daughter of Inachus alone. Io was born from Inachus' mouth. Aside from the Inachians of whom he was simply the back-formed eponym, his other children include Mycene, the eponym of Mycenae, the spring nymph Amymone, Messeis, Hyperia, Themisto (mother of Arcas by Zeus). Argus Panoptes was also called the son of Inachus as what Asclepiades also asserts.

Comparative table of Inachus' family
Relation	Names	Sources								
Relation	Names	Hesiod	Valerius	Apollodorus		Hyginus	Pausanias	Augustine	Pseudo-Clement	Tzetzes
Parents	Oceanus and Tethys			✓		✓				
Wife	Melia			✓	?					
Wife	Argia					✓				
Children	Mycene	✓					✓			
Children	Io		✓		✓	✓	✓	✓	✓	
Children	Amymone		✓							
Children	Messeis		✓							-
Children	Hyperia		✓							
Children	Phoroneus			✓		✓	✓	✓		
Children	Aegialeus			✓						
Children	Argus Panoptes				✓					
Children	Phegeous (Aegialeus)							✓		
Children	Themisto								✓	
Children	Philodoce									✓

== Mythology ==
=== Reign ===
The historian Pausanias describes him as the eldest king of Argos who named the river after himself and sacrificed to Hera. He also notes that some said he was not a mortal, but a river. Inachus was also said to be first priest at Argos, the country was frequently called the land of Inachus. Jerome and Eusebius (both citing Castor of Rhodes), and as even late as 1812, John Lemprière euhemeristically asserted that he was the first king of Argos reigning for 50 years (B.C. 1807). Inachus divided the territories between his sons, Phegeus and Phoroneus who succeeded him as the second king of Argos. Inachus contemporary was Leucippus, the eight king of Sicyon.

The ancients themselves made several attempts to explain the stories about Inachus: sometimes they looked upon him as a native of Argos, who after the deluge of Deucalion led the Argives from the mountains into the plains, and confined the waters within their proper channels. After rendering the province of Argolis inhabitable again, he then founded the city of Argos. Other times, the ancients regarded Inachus as an immigrant who had come across the sea as the leader of an Egyptian or Libyan colony, and had united the Pelasgians, whom he found scattered on the banks of the Inachus. They who make Inachus to have come into Greece from beyond the sea regard his name as a Greek form for the Oriental term Enak, denoting “great” or “powerful,” and this last as the base of the Greek ἄναξ, “a king.”

In Virgil's Aeneid, Inachus is represented on Turnus's shield. Compare the Inachos or Brimos of the Eleusinian Mysteries.

Regnal titles
Preceded by New creation	King of Argos	Succeeded by Phoroneus

INACHUS' CHRONOLOGY OF REIGN ACCORDING TO VARIOUS SOURCES
Kings of Argos	Regnal Years		Castor	Regnal Years		Syncellus	Regnal Years	Apollodorus	Hyginus	Tatian	Pausanias
Inachus	1677	50 winters & summers	Inachus	1677.5	56 winters & summers	Inachus	1675	Inachus	-do-	-do-	-do-
Successor	1652	60 winters & summers	Phoroneus	1649.5	60 winters & summers	Phoroneus	1650	Phoroneus	-do-	-do-	-do-

=== Contest of Poseidon and Hera ===
Inachus and his river god brothers Cephissus and Asterion were mediators in a land dispute between Poseidon and Hera. When they judged that the land belonged to Hera, Poseidon took away their water out of anger. For this reason neither Inachus nor either of the other rivers provided any water except during rainy seasons. In Danaan founding myth, because of the springs of Argolid being dried up, King Danaus sent his daughters to draw water to counter this drought. One of these daughters, Amymone, in her search lay with Poseidon who revealed to her the springs at Lerna. Otherwise, Poseidon was also said to have flooded the greater part of the country as his revenge but Hera induced Poseidon to send the sea back. The Argives then made a sanctuary to Poseidon Prosclystius (Flooder) at the spot where the tide ebbed.

=== Tales about Io ===
==== Aeschylus ====
In an episode in Prometheus Bound, a horned Io recalls her history to Prometheus of being disturbed by visions during her sleep night after night, where Zeus lusted for her maidenhood, but of initially rejecting the god's advances. When Io gained the courage to tell Inachus about these haunting dreams, his father sent many messengers to consult the oracle of Pytho and Dodona so that he might discover what deed or word of his would find favor with the gods. But the messengers returned with report of oracles, riddling, obscure, and darkly-worded. Then at last there came an unmistakable utterance to Inachus, charging and commanding him clearly that he must thrust forth Io from his house and native land to roam at large to the remotest confines of the earth, because if Inachus would not follow the oracle's instructions, Zeus would hurl a fiery thunderbolt that would utterly destroy his whole race. The king yielding in obedience to such prophetic utterances of Loxias (Apollo), Inachus drove his daughter away and barred her from his house, against his and Io's will.

==== Ovid ====
According to Ovid, Inachus was the only one absent when his fellow river gods, Sperchios, Enipeus, Amphrysos, Apidanus and Aeas, visited Peneus, father of Daphne, following the pursuit of his daughter by the god Apollo and her transformation into a laurel tree (they are not sure whether to congratulate or to condole Peneus). It was explained that Inachus hid in his cave, deepening his waters with his tears, bewailing also for his daughter Io who was lost. Inachus and his naiad daughters did not recognize Io, whom Zeus had transformed into a cow so that she could avoid detection by his jealous wife, Hera.

And Inachus and all her [i.e. Io] sister Naiads knew her not, although she followed them, they knew her not, although she suffered them to touch her sides and praise her. When the ancient Inachus gathered sweet herbs and offered them to her, she licked his hands, kissing her father's palms, nor could she more restrain her falling tears. If only words as well as tears would flow, she might implore his aid and tell her name and all her sad misfortune; but, instead, she traced in dust the letters of her name with cloven hoof; and thus her sad estate was known.

At this, Inachus understood Io's condition, and, lamenting, wished for death, but acknowledged his godly status made this an impossibility. Io subsequently recovered her original form and came to be worshipped as a goddess.

==== Diodorus Siculus ====
In the account of Diodorus Siculus, after Io's disappearance, Inachus sent forth Cyrnus, one of his men in high command, fitting him out with a considerable fleet, and ordered him to hunt for Io in every region and not to return unless he had got possession of her. And Cyrnus, after having wandered over many parts of the inhabited world without being able to find her, put ashore in Caria on the Cherronesus where he founded a city which bore his name Cyrnus.

==== Parthenius ====
In a rare variant of the myth according to Parthenius, Inachus sent several men to search and attempt to find her daughter Io who had been captured by brigands (not Zeus this time). One of these was Lyrcus, the son of Phoroneus, who covered a vast deal of land and sea without finding the girl, and finally renounced the toilsome quest. But he was too much afraid of Inachus to return to Argos and went instead to Caunus, where he married Hilebia, daughter of King Aegialus.

==== Plutarch ====
According to Plutarch, the river Inachus had before borne the name of Carmanor or Haliacmon. Afterwards it was called after Inachus, the son of Oceanus. After Zeus (Jupiter) had deflowered his daughter Io, Inachus pursued the deity close at the heels, abusing and cursing him all the way as he went. Which so offended Zeus, that he sent Tisiphone, one of the Furies, who haunted and plagued him to that degree, that he flung himself into the river Haliacmon, bearing his own name afterwards.

==== Suda ====
Inachos, a king of Argos, founded a city which he named for the moon, Io, for that is what Argives call the moon. He also had a daughter Io; Pekos who is also Zeus abducted her and fathered a daughter, Libya, by her. And Io, lamenting her ruin, fled to the Silpion Mountain and there died. Her father and her brothers, when they learned this, built a shrine to her and called the place Iopolis and remained there until the end. And they performed a ritual in her memory, banging on each other's doors every year and saying 'io, io!'.

==== Sophocles ====
Sophocles wrote an Inachos, probably a satyr play, which survives only in some papyrus fragments found at Oxyrhyncus and Tebtunis, Egypt; in it Inachos is reduced from magnificence to misery through the unrequited love of Zeus for his daughter Io. Hermes wears the cap of darkness, rendering him invisible, but plays the aulos, to the mystification of the satyrs; Argos and Iris, as a messenger of Hera both appear, a "stranger" turns Io into a heifer at the touch of a hand, and at the end, apparently, the satyrs are freed from their bondage, to become shepherds of Inachos. An additional papyrus fragment of Sophocles' Inachos was published in 1960.

==== Eliyas of Nisibis ====
Eliyas of Nisibis wrote in his chronography that Inachus was the father of Isis, the Egyptian goddess.

== Descendants ==
Argive genealogy in Greek mythology

Oceanus	Tethys
Inachus	Melia
Zeus	Io	Phoroneus
Epaphus	Memphis
Libya	Poseidon
Achiroë	Belus	Agenor	Telephassa
Danaus	Elephantis	Aegyptus	Cadmus	Cilix	Europa	Phoenix
Mantineus	Hypermnestra	Lynceus	Harmonia	Zeus
Sparta	Lacedaemon	Ocalea	Abas	Polydorus	Agave	Sarpedon	Rhadamanthus
Eurydice	Acrisius	Autonoë	Ino	Minos
Zeus	Danaë	Semele	Zeus
Perseus	Dionysus

Colour key:

Male
Female
Deity

== Reference sources ==
- Harry Thurston Peck. Harpers Dictionary of Classical Antiquities s.v. Inachus. New York. Harper and Brothers (1898).
- William Smith. A Dictionary of Greek and Roman biography and mythology s.v. Inachus. London. John Murray (1848).
