= Byzas =

Greek mythical character, founder of Byzantium

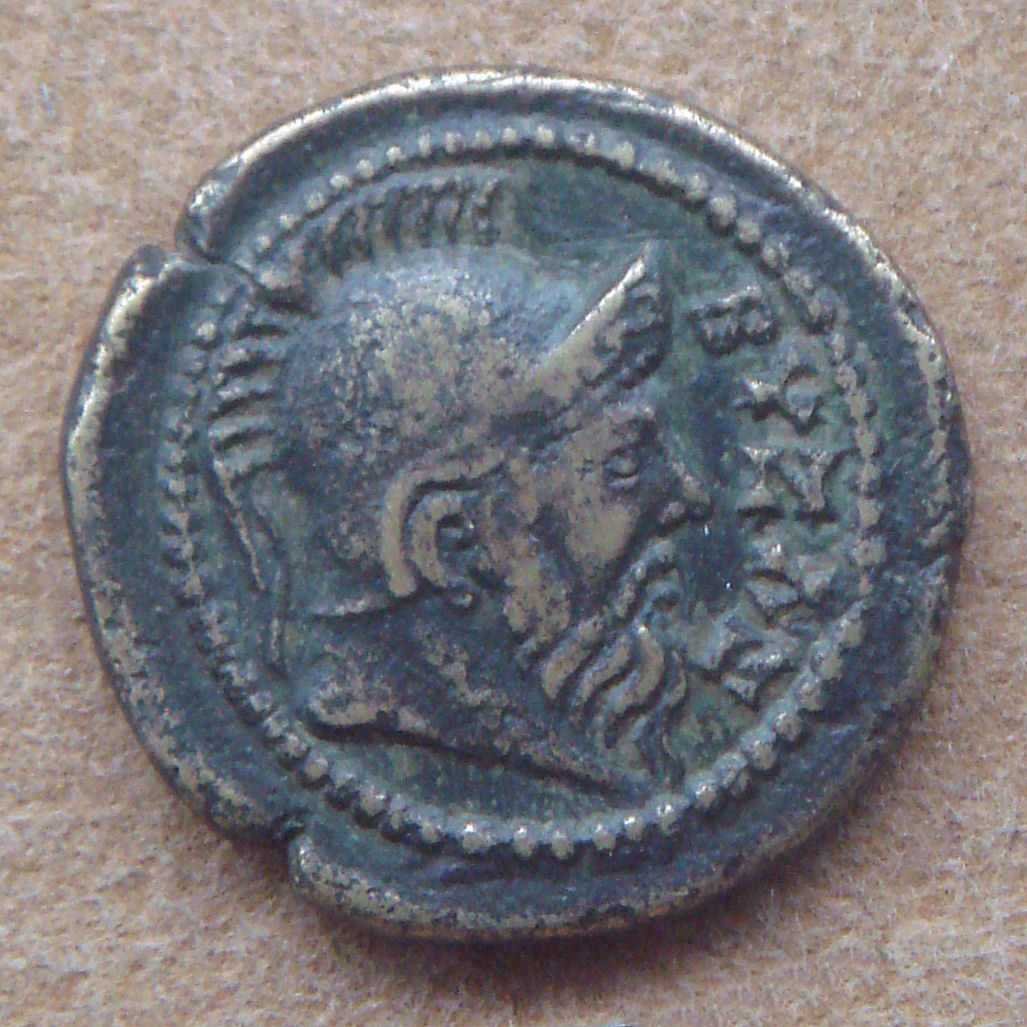
- Coinage with idealized depiction of Byzas, the legendary founder of Byzantium, around the time of Emperor Marcus Aurelius (161–180).

Genealogy
- Born: Megara
- Parents: Keroessa or Semystra and Poseidon

Byzas (Ancient Greek: Βύζας, Býzas) was the legendary founder of Byzantium (Ancient Greek: Βυζάντιον, Byzántion), the city later known as New Rome and Constantinople (named after Roman Emperor Constantine the Great). The city today is known as Istanbul and is home to 18% of the population of Turkey.

== Background ==
The legendary history of the founding of Byzantium as recorded by later Byzantine authors is most fully preserved in the Patria of Constantinople by 6th century writer Hesychius of Miletus. The Patria recorded multiple versions of the city's founding myth. Hesychius' preferred account says the city received its name from Io, daughter of the Argive king Inachus, who was raped by Zeus and then transformed into a cow. Zeus had fallen in love with Io, and in a jealous fit, Hera sent a gadfly to drive Io from one place to another in torment until she arrived in Thrace, giving birth to Ceroessa, the mother of Byzas by Poseidon, for whom the Golden Horn was named Ceras. One tradition holds that the city was founded by the Argives, who received an oracle at Delphi regarding the Golden Horn. Another claims Megarians (led by Byzas) are the founders, and yet another says Byzas is the son of a local nymph, Semystra.

== Founder of Byzantium ==
During the 7th century BC, the Greek city-states were expanding and establishing new colonies. The Dorian city-state of Megara, near Athens, was also seeking sites to set up yet another colony. After asking the oracle of Delphi, the Megarean king Nisos sent his son Byzas in search of "the land opposite the city of the blind".

When Byzas arrived at the point where the Sea of Marmara meets the Bosporus, on the border of Europe and Asia, he realized the meaning of the oracle. On the Asian shore, opposite to where he was, a colony, Chalcedon, had already been established. Byzas decided that Chalcedon was the prophesied 'city of the blind', as it had not taken advantage of the European shore.

To build his new city, he selected the European shore at the southern end of the Bosporos and named it Byzantion. Later, Byzas married Phidalea, the daughter of King Barbizos (or Babisios) of Thrace. The inhabitants of ancient Byzantion considered Byzas their founder (Oikistes) and, according to ancient sources, honoured him by raising a statue of Byzas and his wife, Phidalea, in a noticeable place in the city.

The ancients had a very good understanding of the advantages that Byzantion had over Chalcedon, as the colony of Byzantion commanded the entrance to two seas, the Black Sea, through the Sea of Bosporos, and the Aegean Sea, through the Sea of Marmaras (Propontis was its ancient name).

Apart from the story of the Pythian oracle of Apollonian Delphi, as described by the Greek geographer and historian Strabo (63 BC - 23 AD) and by the Roman historian Tacitus (1st century AD), there are other versions of the maxim referring to the "blind people". The Greek historian Herodotos (5th century BC) wrote that when the Persian general Megabazus arrived at Byzantium, he called the people of Chalcedon blind because, although they had a choice of sites, they chose the worst one.

== Sources ==
- A.A.Vasiliev, History of the Byzantine Empire, Univ. Of Wisconsin Press, Vol.I, p. 57, 58
- Afrodite Kamaras, EHW, 2008, Byzas (URL: <http://www.ehw.gr/l.aspx?id=10948>)
- Alexander Kazhdan, The Oxford Dictionary Of Byzantium, Oxford Un.Press, print publication 1991, online version 2005, Vol.I, entry "Byzantion"
- Herodotos, Ιστορίαι, Histories, Book D, 6.33
- Strabo, Γεωγραφικά, Geography, 7.6
- Procopios, Περί Κτισμάτων, De aedificiis, Α.5
