= Phidalia =

Phidalia (Ancient Greek: Φιδάλια) or Phidaleia (Ancient Greek: Φιδάλεια) is a female figure from ancient Greek mythology associated with the Byzantium and Byzas (the legendary founder of Byzantium).

== Phidalia as a Heroic Defender ==
In one account, Phidalia is the wife of Byzas, the founder and king of Byzantium. When Byzas was absent, driving enemies back toward Thrace, the Scythian king Odryses crossed the Ister river and besieged the city. Phidalia, undaunted by the great number of attackers, took action in defense of the city. She gathered all the snakes near the city and kept them under guard. Then, appearing suddenly before the enemy, she hurled the snakes at them like arrows or javelins, infecting many and saving the city. Because of this deed, a tradition arose that snakes found near the city should not be killed, since they were benefactors.

Nonnus, in his Dionysiaca refers to her as "the serpent-thrower" (δρακοντοβόλου Φιδαλείης) and depicts Bacchant women imitating her attack in battle scenes.

Phidalia is also connected with the Gynaikon Limen (Women's Harbor), an anchorage close to Byzantium. According to tradition, she, together with a group of women, repelled an assault led by Stroibos, Byzas's brother, while the male citizens were away. After driving off the attackers, she chased them as far as the harbor, which was thereafter named Women's Harbor in honor of this event. The harbor was near a place that was called Phidalia. The bay was also called "Limen Phidalias" or "bay of Phidalia".

== Phidalia and founding of Byzantium ==
Malalas in his work write that Byzantium itself was founded initially by Phidalia. Byzas, king of Thrace, took her as his wife after the death of her father Barbysius, the toparch and guard of the emporium. Barbysius, when about to die, commanded Phidalia to build a wall as far as the sea. Byzas called the country after himself and ruled in the city.

== Phidalia rock ==
A rock or promontory near the Bosporos was named Phidalia, described as white and shaped like eagle wings. In one tradition it was named after Phidalia who was the daughter of Barbyssa. After having sex with Byzas and feeling shame, she threw herself into the sea. Poseidon, moved by pity, broke off a piece of the mainland and fixed it in the depths, which became her tomb. This version says that Poseidon was her ancestor.

== Sanctuary of Aphrodite ==
Phidalia is said to have established a sanctuary of Aphrodite in Byzantium. Byzas built a sanctuary to Artemis nearby. Later, during the reign of Severus, a large Kynegion (hunting place) was built opposite the sanctuary of Artemis and a theater opposite the sanctuary of Aphrodite.

== Phidalia in Greek anthology ==
Phidalia is mentioned in the Greek Anthology in two inscriptions:

- "Calliades, fashioning them in a single group, dedicated here mighty Byzas and lovable Phidalia." According to Hesychius of Miletus, this was the inscription on a statue of Byzas, which Calliades, a general of Byzantium who had successfully combatted both foreign and domestic enemies, set up at the so-called Basilica.
- "I, lovable Phidalia, was the wife of Byzas, and I am a gift commemorating a mighty contest."
