= Baltalimanı =

- Neighbourhood
- Location in Turkey Baltalimanı (Istanbul)
- Coordinates: 41°05′N 29°03′E
- Country: Turkey
- Province: Istanbul
- District: Sarıyer
- Population (2022): 5,151
- Time zone: UTC+3 (TRT)

Baltalimanı is a neighbourhood in the municipality and district of Sarıyer, Istanbul Province, Turkey. Its population is 5,151 (2022). It lies at a bay on the European coast of the Bosporus. Take its name from Suleiman Baltoghlu, the commander of the Ottoman fleet at the time of the conquest of Constantinople in 1453.

The place is known for the Treaty of Balta Liman, signed between Great Britain and the Ottoman Empire in 1838.

The ancient name was Gynaikon Limen (Ancient Greek: Γυναικῶν λιμὴν; "Women's Harbor").
