= Damalis =

Ancient settlement in Turkey

Coordinates: 41°01′31″N 29°00′40″E

Damalis (Ancient Greek: Δάμαλις) was a coastal town of ancient Bithynia located on the Bosphorus near Chrysopolis. Polybius calls the town Bus or Bous (Βοῦς, meaning cow in Greek).

The name Damalis means 'heifer', and Arrian, quoted by Eustathius, has a story about it.

According to Greek mythology, Io landed when she crossed the strait and people erected a bronze cow on the spot.

Damalis was the name of the wife of the Athenian general Chares of Athens. She accompanied him and while the fleet was stationed near Byzantium, she died. She was said to have been buried here and have been honoured with a monument of the shape of a cow.

Its site is located at Kızkule in Asiatic Turkey.
