= Chelae (Thrace) =

Town of ancient Thrace

Coordinates: 41°04′41″N 29°02′38″E

Chelae or Chelai (Ancient Greek: Χῆλαι), also called Philemporos, was a town of ancient Thrace on the Bosphorus, inhabited during Roman and Byzantine times.

Its site is located near Bebek in European Turkey.
