= Chelae (Bithynia) =

Coastal town of ancient Bithynia

Coordinates: 41°10′59″N 30°20′15″E

Chelae or Chelai (Ancient Greek: Χῆλαι) was a coastal town of ancient Bithynia located on the Pontus Euxinus. It appears in the Tabula Peutingeriana, and in the Periplus Ponti Euxini written by Arrian, who places it 20 stadia east of Thynias and 180 west of the mouth of the Sangarius River.

Its site is located near Cebice in Asiatic Turkey.
