= Petrus Gyllius =

French scientist, topographer and traveller (1490–1555)

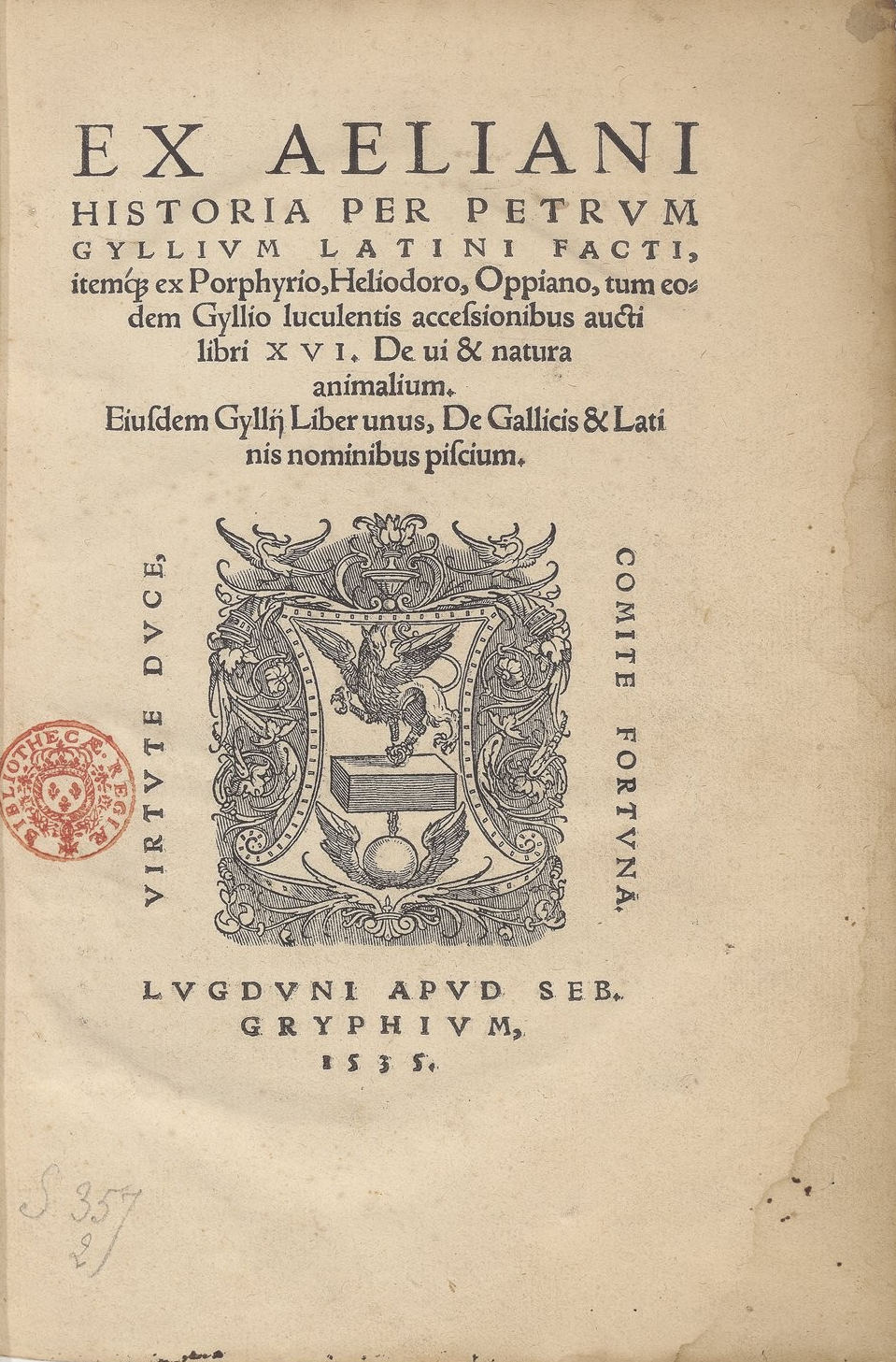
Title page of Petrus Gyllius' 1535 translation of Aelian.

Petrus Gyllius or Gillius (or Pierre Gilles) (1490–1555) was a French natural scientist, topographer and translator.

Gilles was born in Albi, southern France. A great traveller, he studied the Mediterranean and Orient, producing such works as De Topographia Constantinopoleos et de illius antiquitatibus libri IV, Cosmæ Indopleutes and De Bosphoro Thracio libri III, in which he provided the first written account of the Bosphorus, in Latin, as well as a book about the fish of the Mediterranean. Sent by King Francis I of France to Constantinople in 1544-47 to find ancient manuscripts, he discovered a manuscript of the geographical work of Dionysius of Byzantium and wrote a Latin paraphrase of it. Most of his books were published after his death by his nephew. In 1533 he also translated Claudius Aelianus. He died of malaria in Rome while accompanying his patron, Cardinal Georges d'Armagnac.

It is stated that Guillaume-Joseph Grelot continued his work in the 17th-century, publishing his own book in 1680.

== Representation in fiction ==
As Pierre Gilles, Petrus Gyllius plays a small but significant role in Pawn in Frankincense, the fourth volume in the historical fiction series, The Lymond Chronicles, by Dorothy Dunnett.
