= Aegialeus =

Aegialeus (also Aegealeus, Aigialeus, Egialeus; Ancient Greek: Αἰγιαλεύς) is the name of several individuals in Greek mythology or literature:

- Aegialeus (King of Sicyon), reputed founder of Sicyon as 'Aegialea'
- Aegialeus (King of Argos), elder son of Adrastus, a king of Argos
- Aegialeus, an alternative name given by some scholars for Absyrtus, the son of Aeëtes who was murdered by Medea
- Aegialeus (strategos), general of the Achaean league in 242/1 BC
- Aigialeus, an elderly fisherman in Book V of the Ephesian Tale, an ancient Greek novel

== See also ==
- Agesilaus II, king of Sparta from 398 to about 360 BC
