= Io (mythology) =

Mortal woman seduced by Zeus in Greek mythology

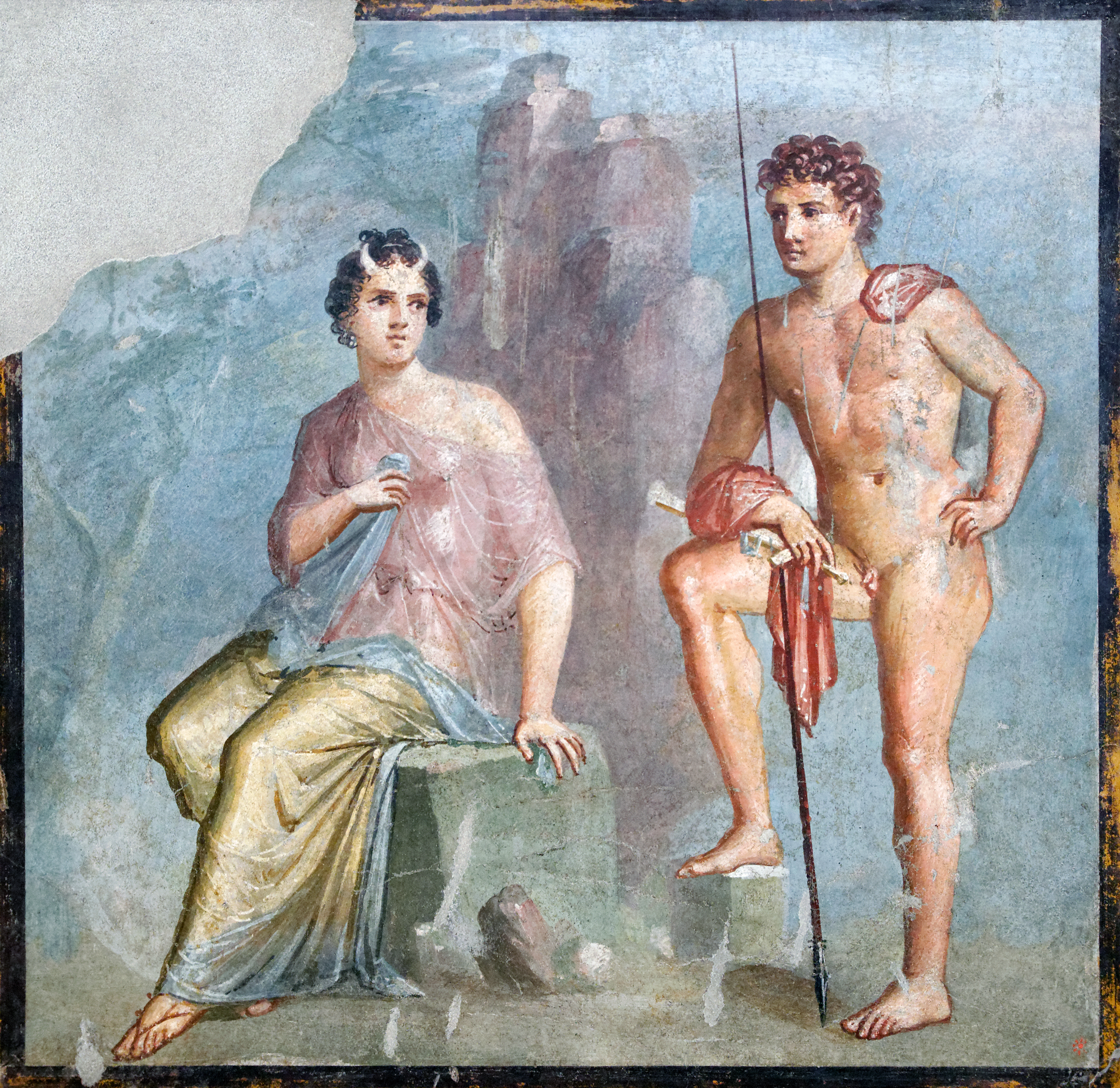
- Io wearing bovine horns watched over by Argos on Hera's orders, antique fresco from Pompeii
- Abode: Argos; Egypt

Genealogy
- Parents: Inachus
- Consort: Zeus; Telegonus
- Children: Keroessa; Epaphus

In Greek mythology, Io (/ˈaɪ.oʊ/; Ancient Greek: Ἰώ [iːɔ̌ː]) was one of the mortal lovers of Zeus. An Argive princess, her descendants included Perseus, Cadmus, Heracles, Minos, Lynceus, Cepheus, Dionysus, and Danaus. The astronomer Simon Marius named a moon of Jupiter after Io in 1614. The Ionian Islands are also named after Io (not to be confused with the ancient region of Ionia which was named after Ion).

Because her brother was Phoroneus, Io is also known as Phoronis (an adjective form of Phoroneus: "Phoronean"). She was sometimes compared to the Egyptian goddess Isis, whereas her Egyptian husband Telegonus was Osiris.

== Family ==
In most versions of the legend, Io was the daughter of the river god Inachus, though various other purported genealogies are also known. If her father was Inachus, then her mother would presumably have been Inachus's wife (and sister), the Oceanid nymph Melia, daughter of Oceanus. (Note: For Melia as wife of Inachus see Bibliotheca (Pseudo-Apollodorus)) She had the patronymic Inachis (Ἰναχίς) as daughter of Inachus.

Io's father was called Peiren in the Catalogue of Women, and by Acusilaus, possibly a son of the elder Argus, also known as Peiras, Peiranthus or Peirasus. Io may therefore be identical to Callithyia, daughter of Peiranthus, as is suggested by Hesychius of Alexandria.

The 2nd century AD geographer Pausanias mentions another, later Io, descendant of Phoroneus, daughter of Iasus, who himself was the son of Argus and Ismene, the daughter of Asopus, or of Triopas and Sosis; Io's mother in the latter case was Leucane.

== Mythology ==
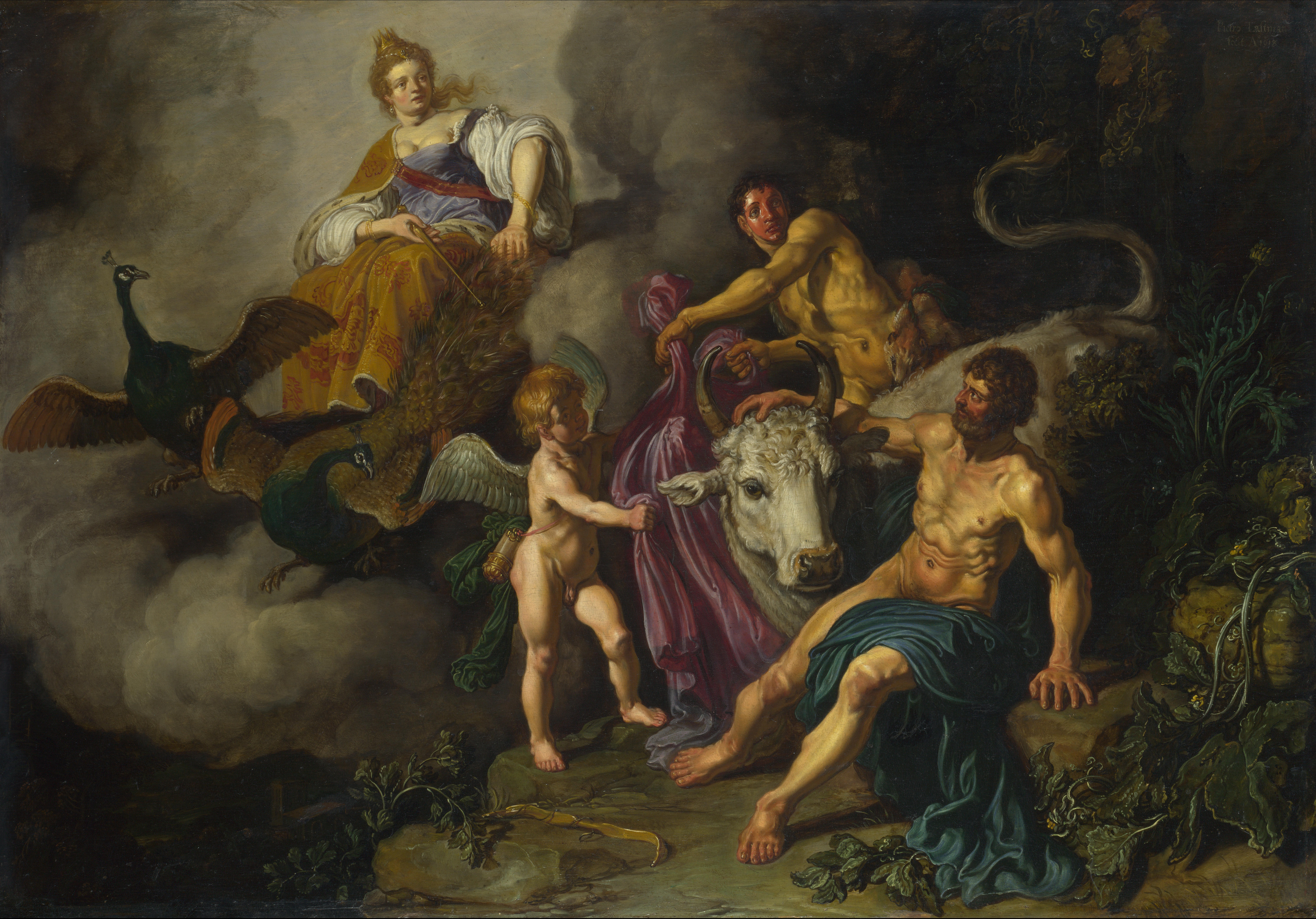
Juno Discovering Jupiter with Io by Pieter Lastman

=== Io and Zeus ===
Io was a priestess of the goddess Hera in Argos, whose cult her father Inachus was supposed to have introduced to Argos. Zeus noticed Io, a mortal woman, and lusted after her. In the version of the myth told in Prometheus Bound she initially rejected Zeus's advances, until her father threw her out of his house on the advice of oracles. In Ovid's Metamorphoses, Zeus pursues a fleeing Io through the Lycrean country, throwing a mantle of darkness over the earth, and then rapes her. According to some stories, Zeus then turned Io into a heifer in order to hide her from his wife; others maintain that Hera herself transformed Io.

In the version of the story in which Zeus transformed Io, the deception failed, and Hera begged Zeus to give her the heifer as a present, which, having no reason to refuse, he did. Pitying the unfortunate girl, Gaia, the goddess of the earth, created the violet (Ancient Greek: ἴον, romanized: ion), so the cow could eat, thus growing "from her from whom it has its name". The various colours of the violet (red, purple, white) changed on account of Io's life, red for the blushing maiden, purple for the cow, white for the stars. Hera then sent Argus Panoptes, a giant who had 100 eyes, to watch Io and prevent Zeus from visiting her, and so Zeus sent Hermes to distract and eventually slay Argus. According to Ovid, he did so by first lulling him to sleep by playing the panpipes and telling stories. Zeus freed Io, still in the form of a heifer. In some myths, Hera uses Argus's eyes to decorate her peacock's feathers to thank the giant for his help.

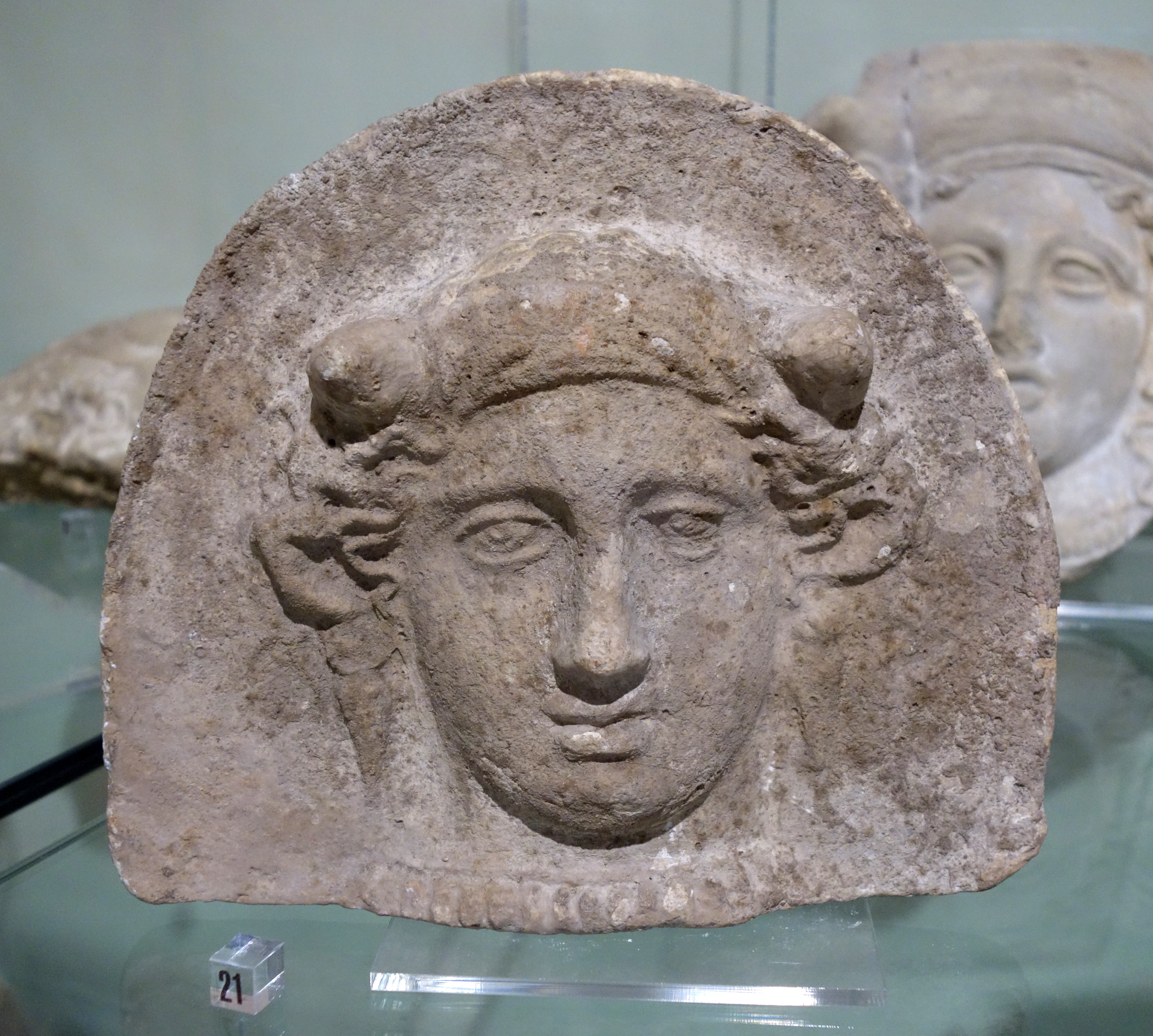
Terracotta antefix with the head of Io, 4th century BCE (Brindisi, Museo archeologico Francesco Ribezzo)

In order to exact her revenge, Hera sent a gadfly to sting Io continuously, driving her to wander the world without rest. Io eventually crossed the path between the Propontis and the Black Sea, which thus acquired the name Bosporus (meaning ox passage), where she met Prometheus, who had been chained on Mt. Caucasus by Zeus. Prometheus comforted Io with the information that she would be restored to human form and become the ancestress of the greatest of all heroes, Heracles (Hercules). Io escaped across the Ionian Sea to Egypt, where she was restored to human form by Zeus. There, she gave birth to Zeus's son Epaphus, and a daughter as well, Keroessa. She later married Egyptian king Telegonus. Their grandson, Danaus, eventually returned to Greece with his fifty daughters (the Danaids), as recalled in Aeschylus's play The Suppliants.

The myth of Io must have been well known to Homer, who often calls Hermes Argeiphontes, which is often translated as "Argus-slayer", though this interpretation is disputed by Robert Beekes. Walter Burkert notes that the story of Io was told in the ancient epic tradition at least four times of which we have traces: in the Danais, in the Phoronis—Phoroneus founded the cult of Hera, according to Hyginus's Fabulae 274 and 143—in a fragment of the Hesiodic Aigimios, as well as in similarly fragmentary Hesiodic Catalogue of Women. A mourning commemoration of Io was observed at the Heraion of Argos into classical times.

The ancients connected Io with the Moon, and in Aeschylus's Prometheus Bound, where Io encounters Prometheus, she refers to herself as "the horned virgin". From her relationship with Phoroneus, as sister (or descendant), Io is sometimes called Phoronis.

According to the Dictionary of Greek and Roman Biography and Mythology by William Smith, Io at some point landed at Damalis, and the Chalcedonians erected a bronze cow on the spot.

=== Io as Isis ===
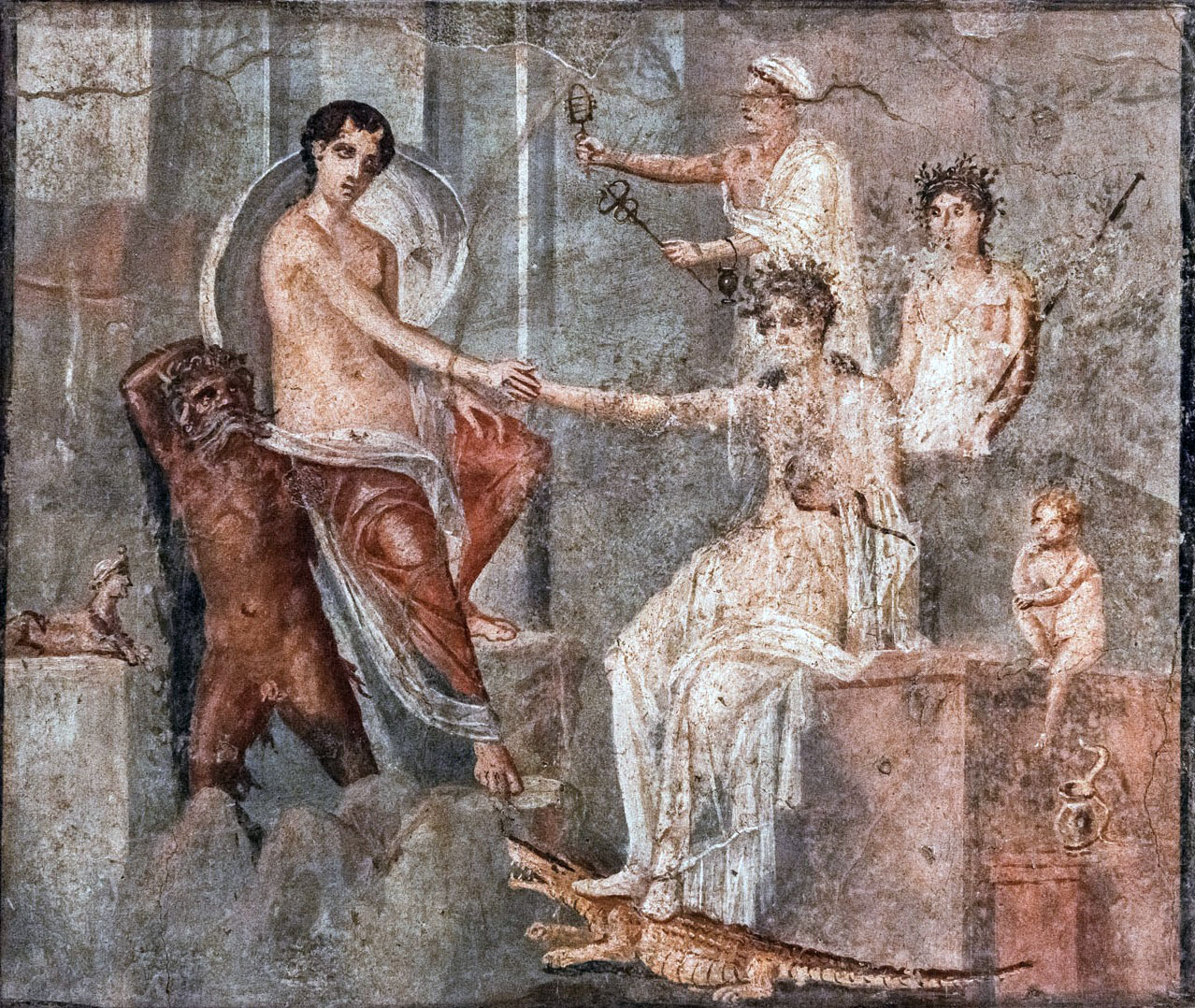
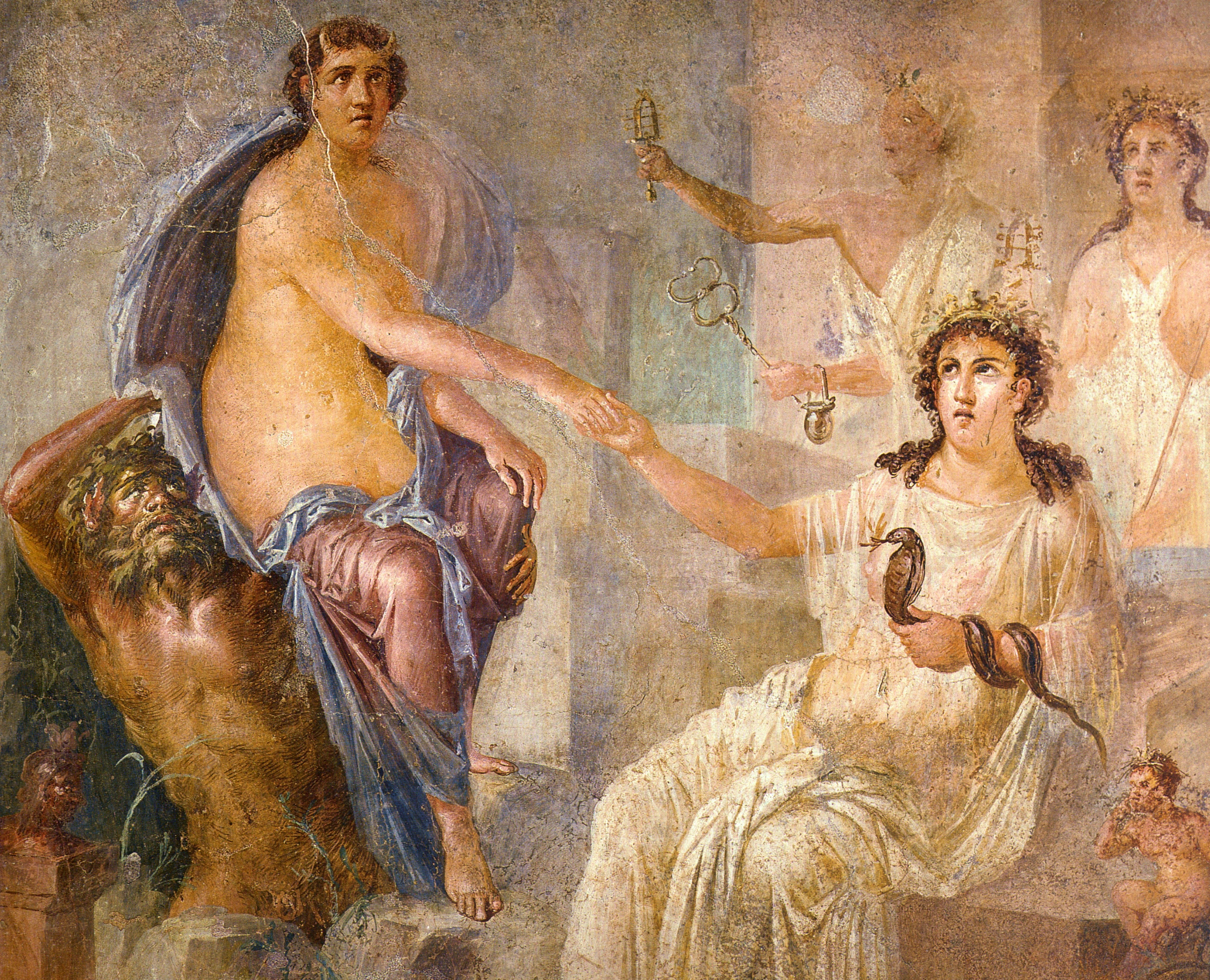
The goddess Isis receives Io at Canopus. Antique frescoes in Pompeii.

Lygdus and his wife, Telethusa, were a poor couple living in Crete. When Telethusa becomes pregnant, her husband tells her that they cannot afford to have a daughter, and that they have no other option than to kill the child if it is a daughter. Eight months later Io, later in the story mentioned as Isis, comes in a vision to Telethusa telling her that she should keep her daughter when it is born and must tell her husband that it is a boy named Iphis.

Later in the story, Isis (Io) changes Iphis's sex when she is supposed to marry her fiancée, Ianthe.

Argive genealogy in Greek mythology

Oceanus	Tethys
Inachus	Melia
Zeus	Io	Phoroneus
Epaphus	Memphis
Libya	Poseidon
Achiroë	Belus	Agenor	Telephassa
Danaus	Elephantis	Aegyptus	Cadmus	Cilix	Europa	Phoenix
Mantineus	Hypermnestra	Lynceus	Harmonia	Zeus
Sparta	Lacedaemon	Ocalea	Abas	Polydorus	Agave	Sarpedon	Rhadamanthus
Eurydice	Acrisius	Autonoë	Ino	Minos
Zeus	Danaë	Semele	Zeus
Perseus	Dionysus

Colour key:

Male
Female
Deity

== Gallery ==
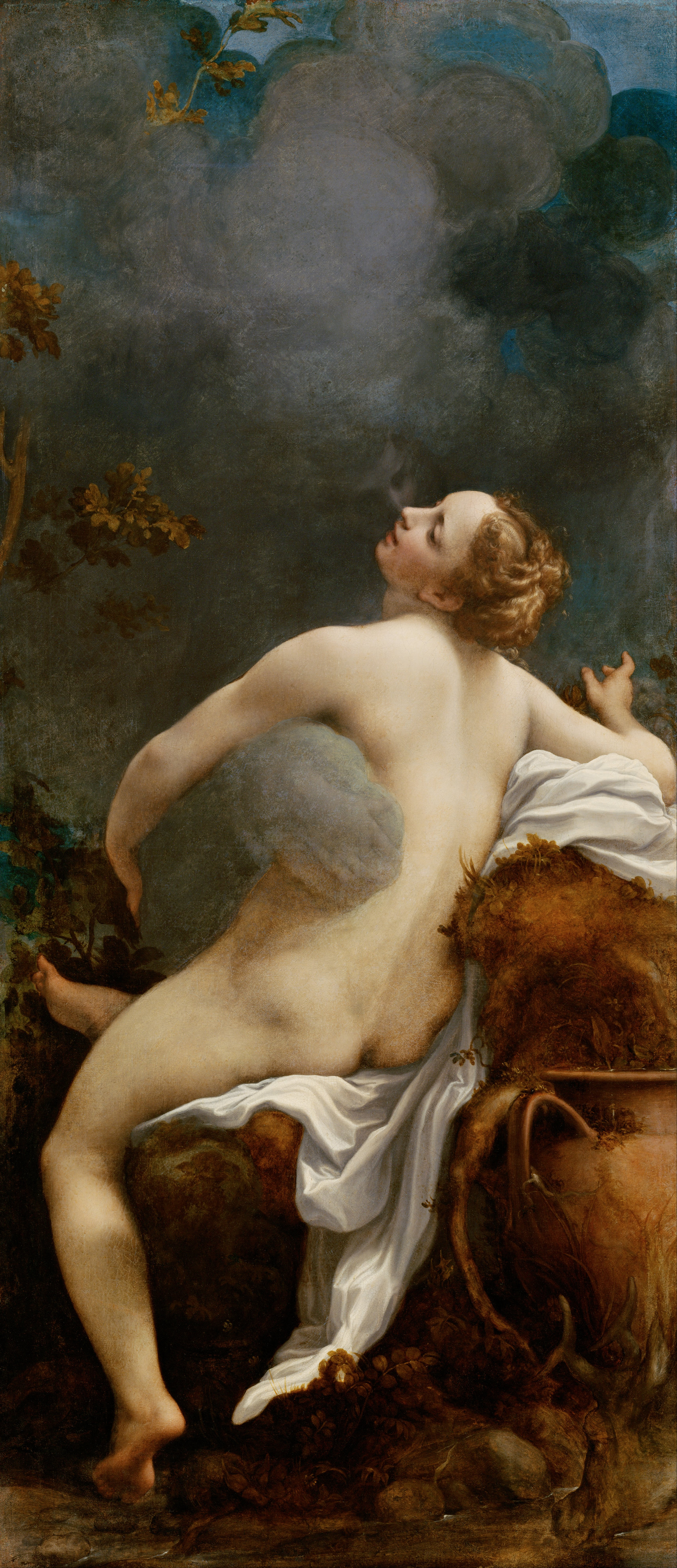
Jupiter and Io by Antonio da Correggio

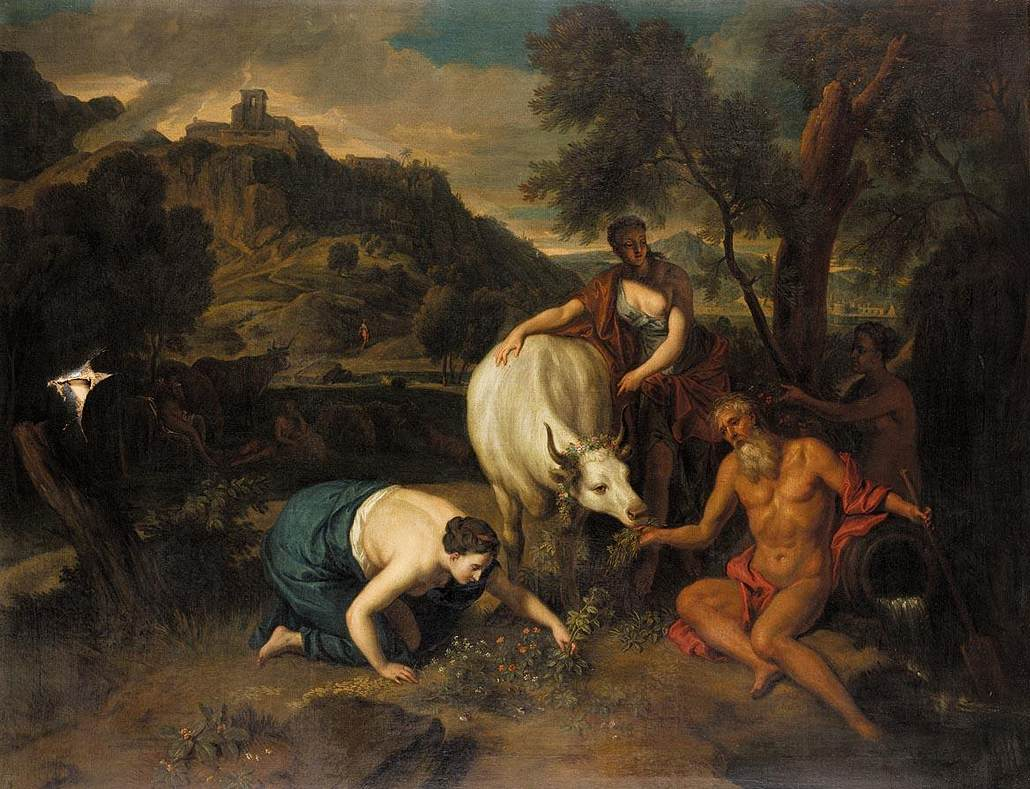
Io Recognised by Her Father by Victor Honoré Janssens (second half of 17th century)

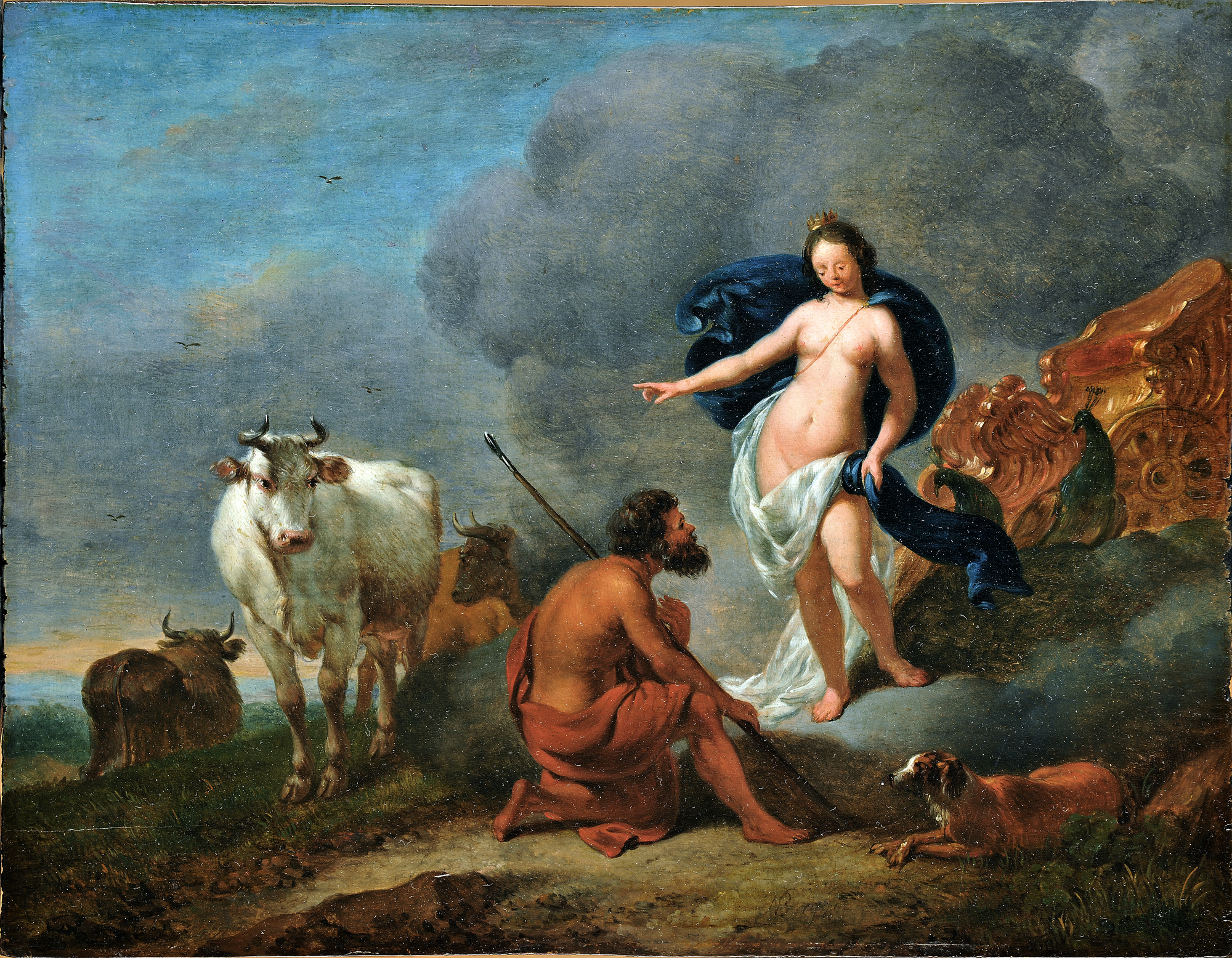
Hera and Io by Nicolaes Pieterszoon Berchem the Younger (circa 1669)

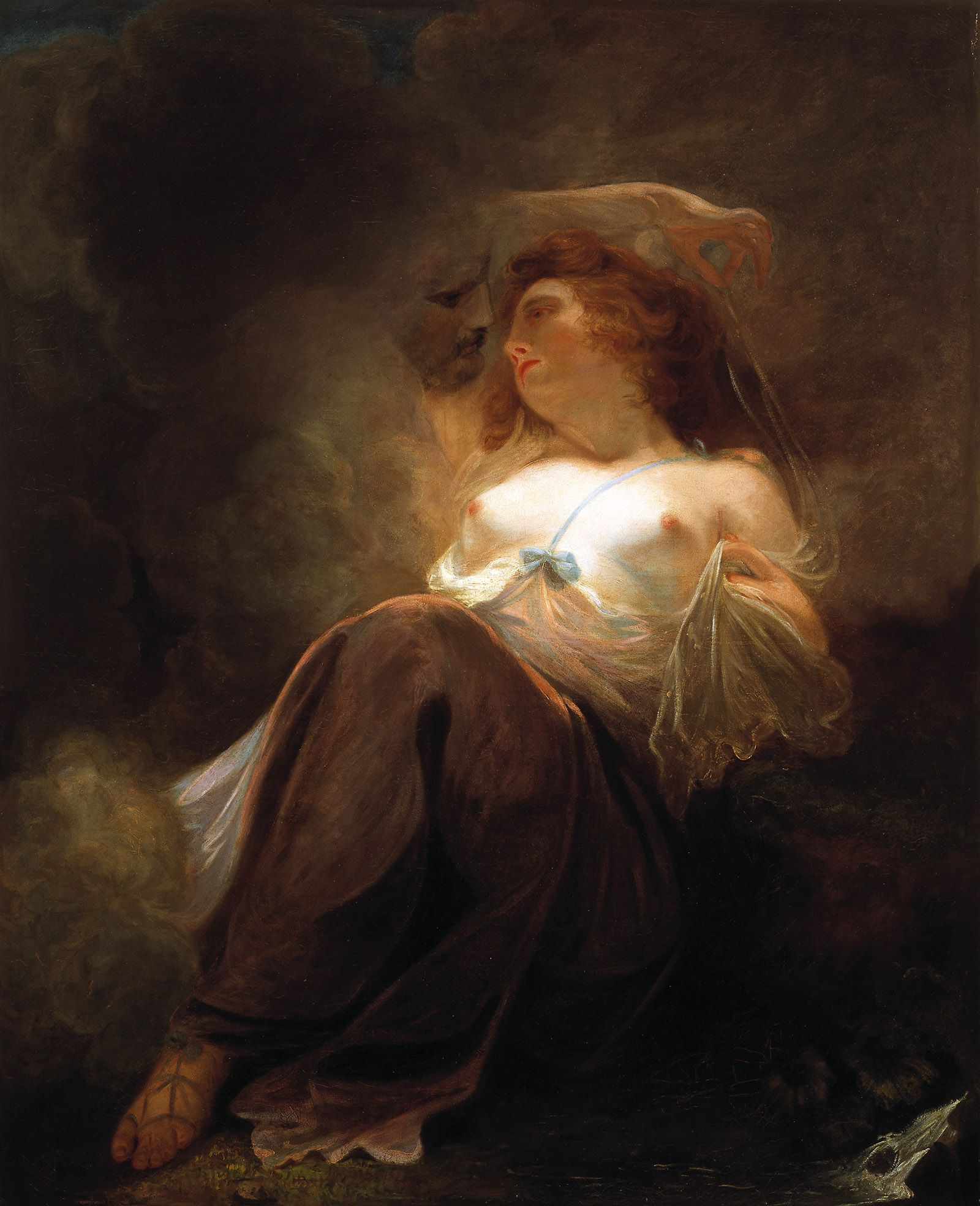
Jupiter and Io by John Hoppner (1785) at Denver Art Museum

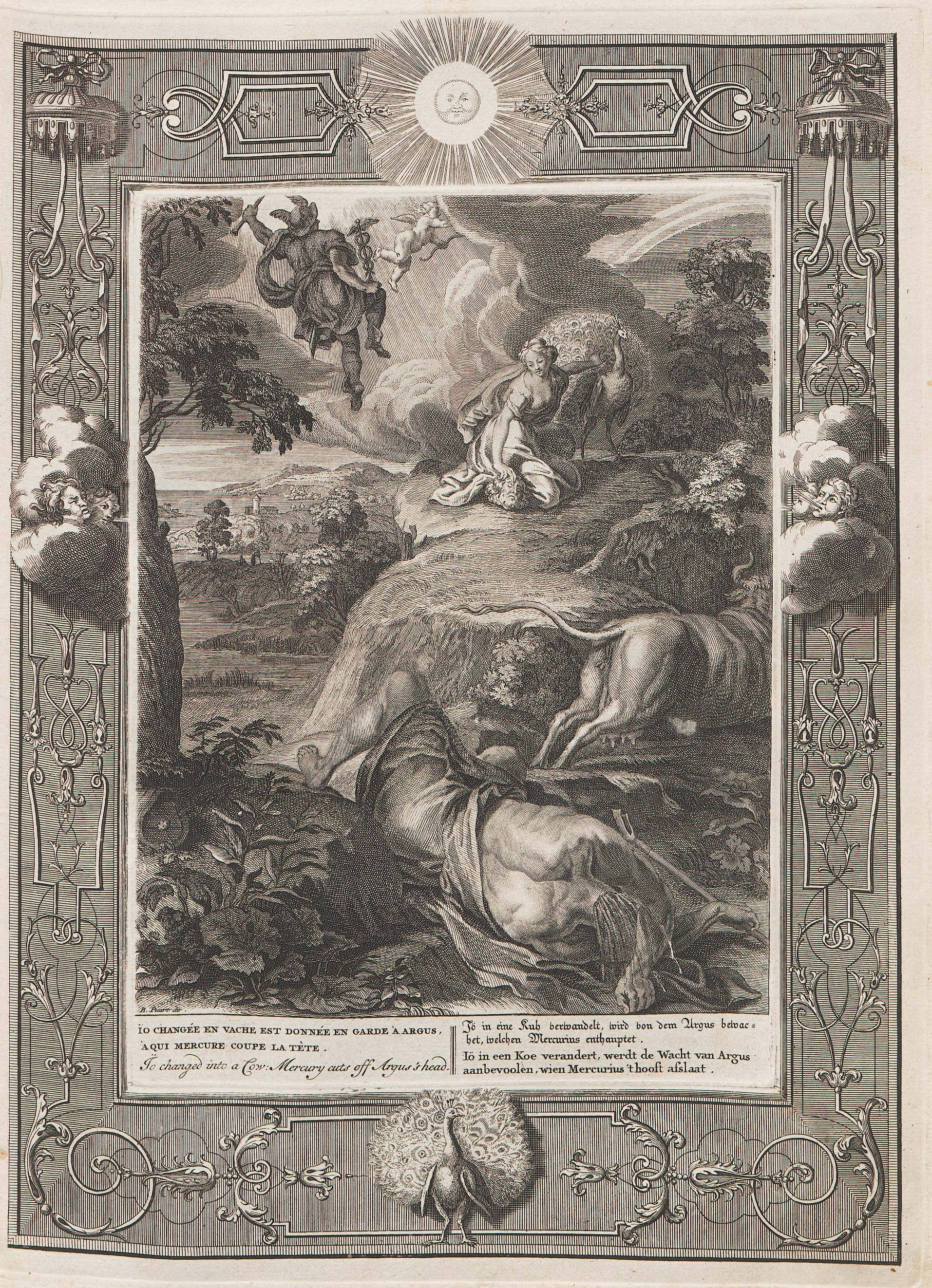
From Neueröffneter Musen-Tempel by Bernard Picart (1733), University of Heidelberg

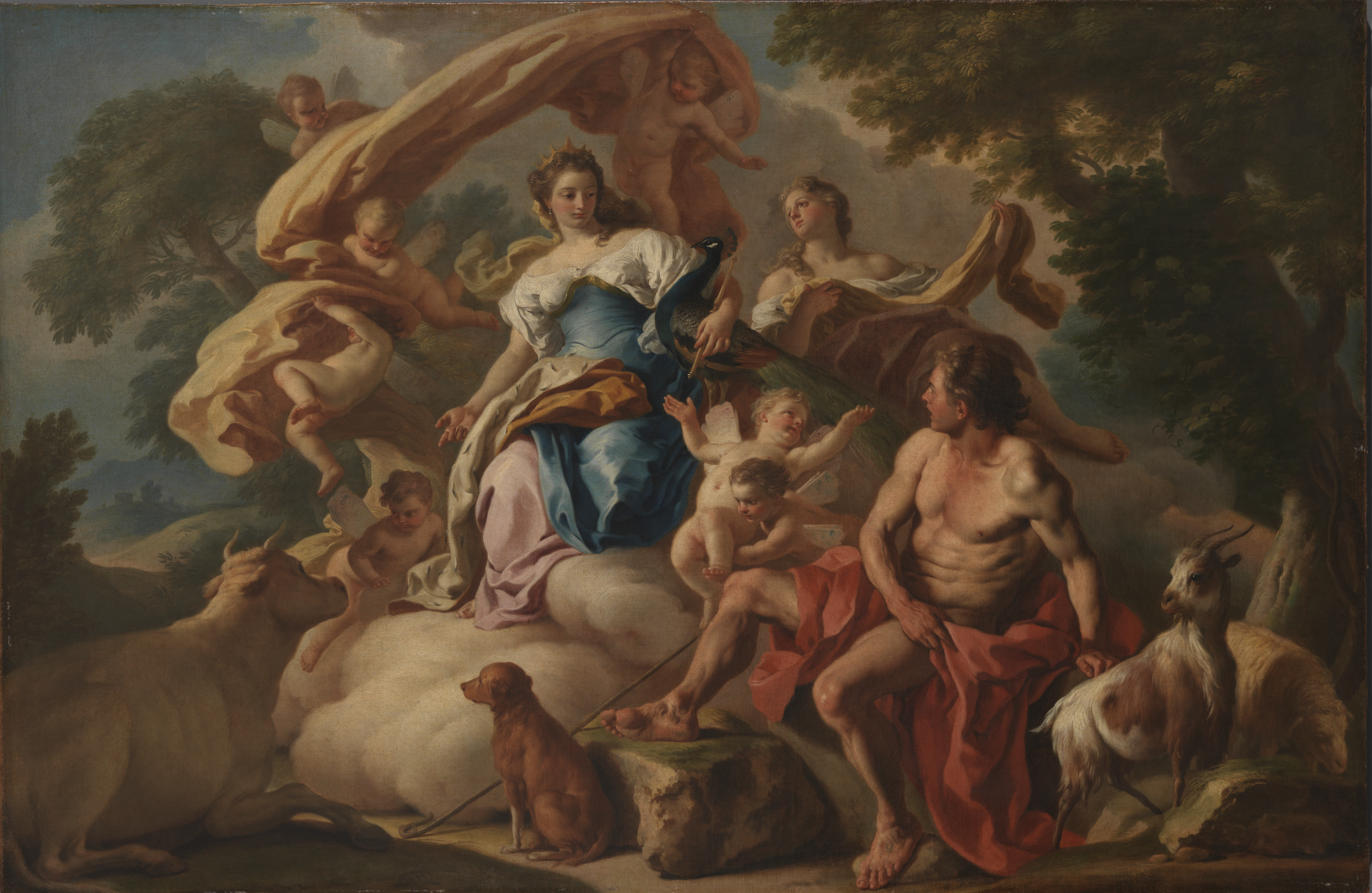
Juno (Hera) commits Io to Argus Panoptes by Francesco de Mura (1740–1750) at Museum of Modern and Contemporary Art of Trento and Rovereto, Italy

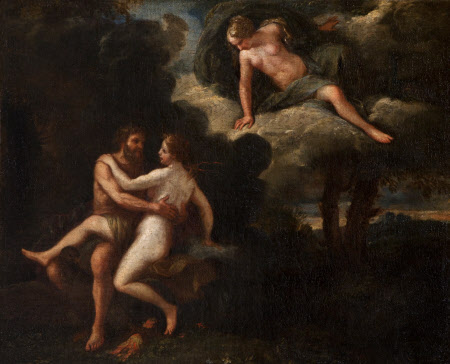
Jupiter and Io, espied by Juno by Andrea Sacchi and Pier Francesco Mola (1600 - 1699) at Kedleston Hall, Derbyshire (Accredited Museum)

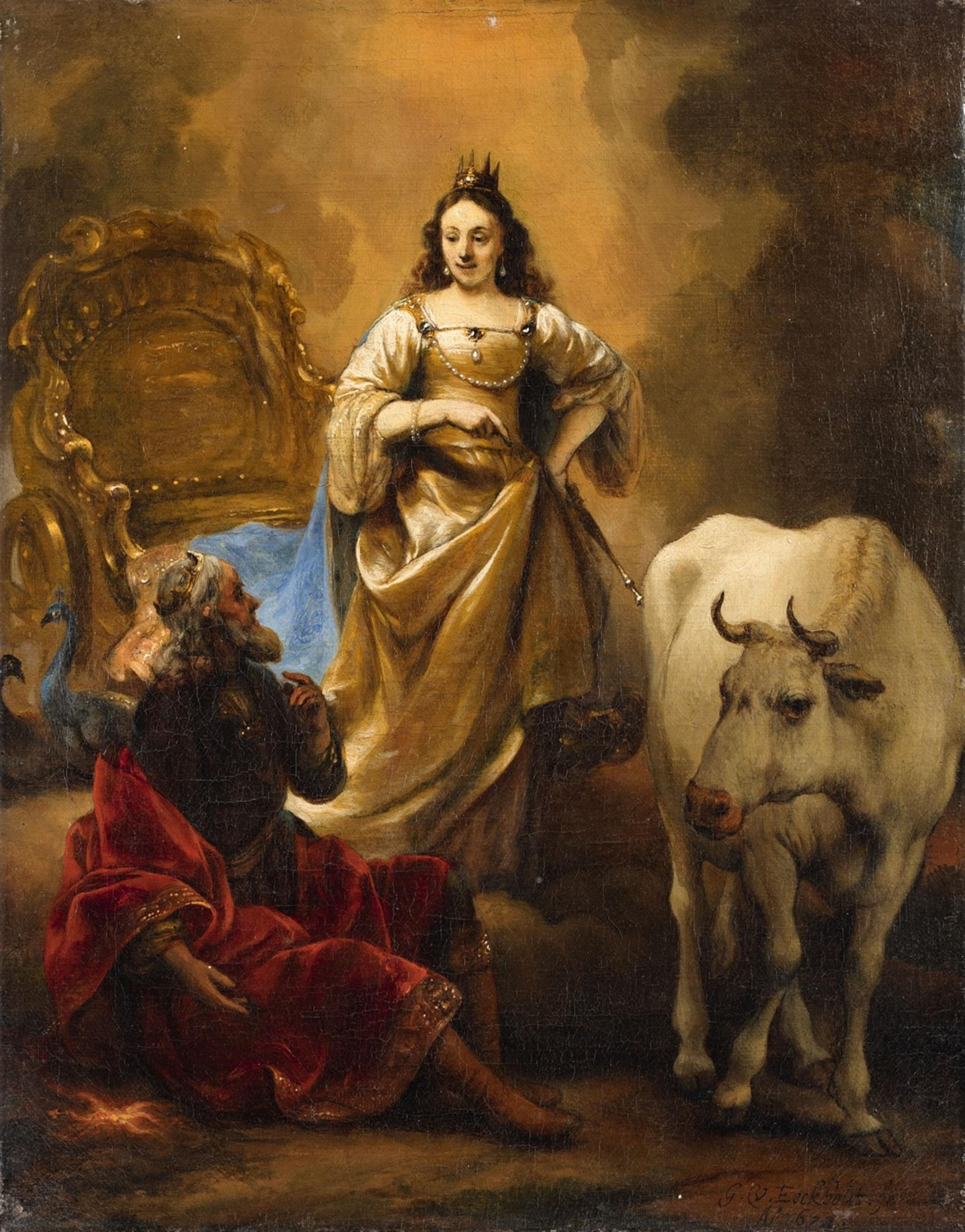
Juno, Jupiter and Io by Gerbrand van den Eeckhout

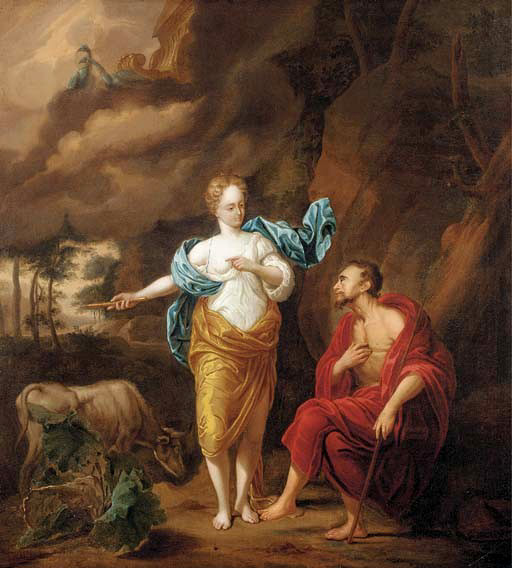
Jupiter, Juno and Io by Arnold Houbraken

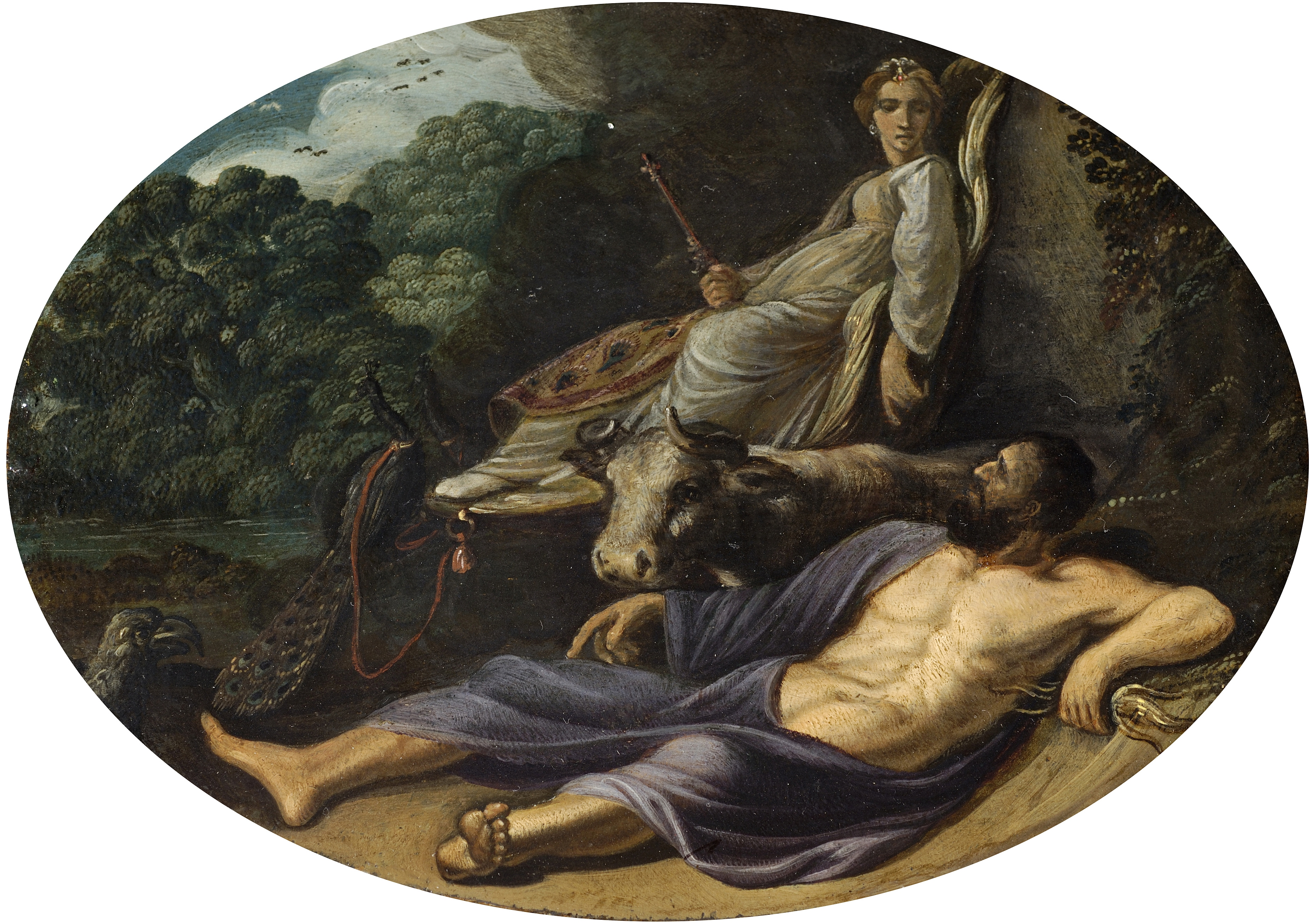
Jupiter and Io by Jacob Pynas at The Fitzwilliam Museum, UK

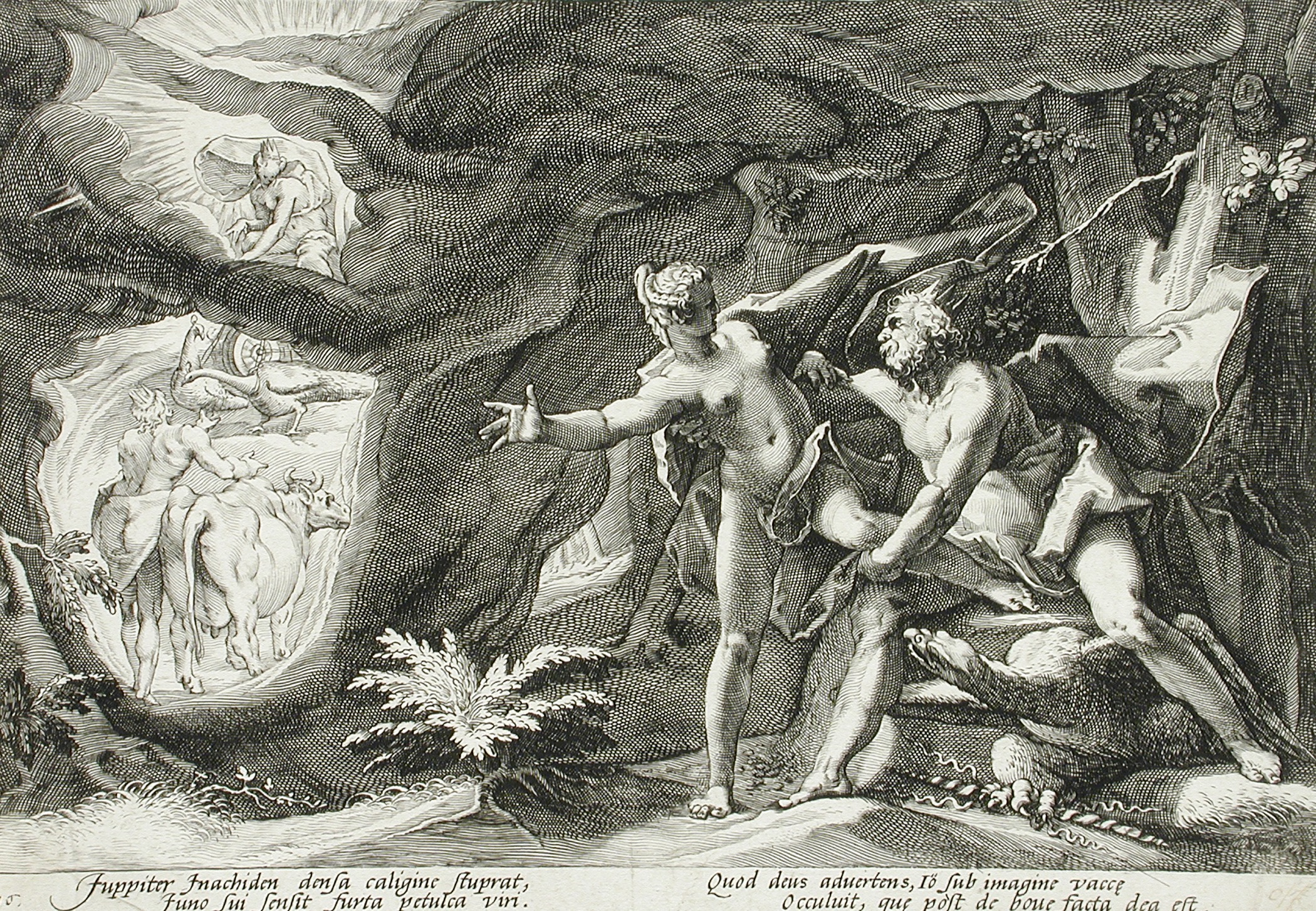
Jupiter and Io by Hendrik Goltzius (1589) at Los Angeles County Museum of Art, Los Angeles
