= Dionysius of Byzantium =

Greek geographer

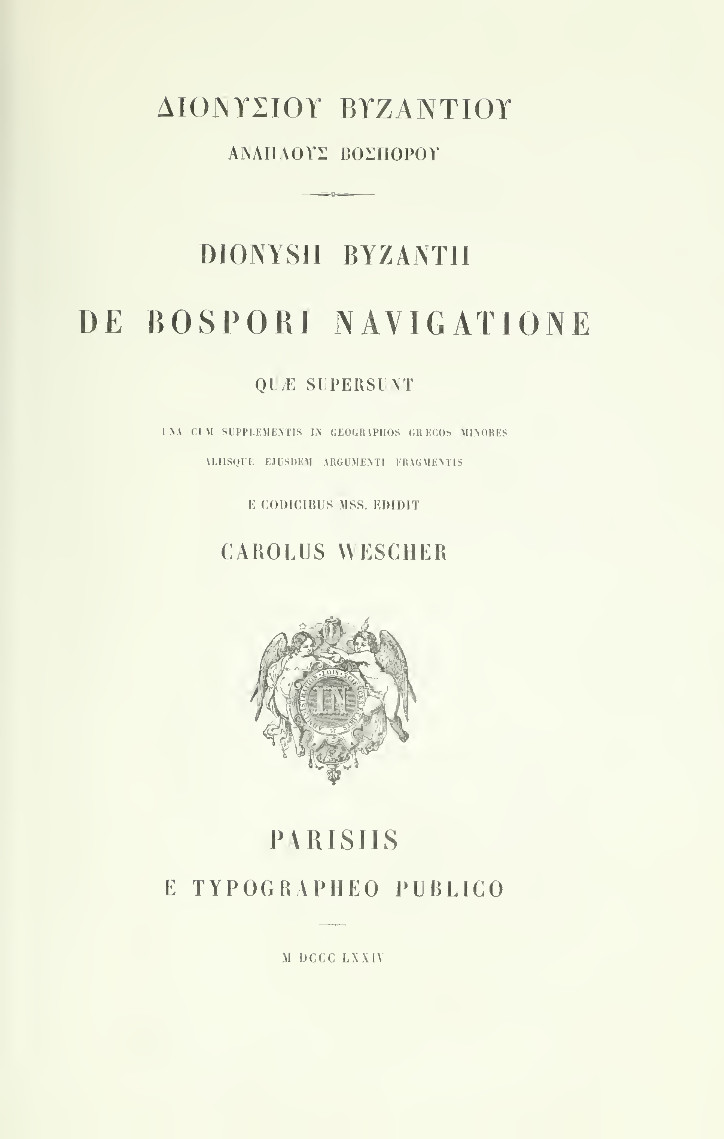
De Bospori Navigatione - 1874.jpg

Dionysius of Byzantium (Greek ∆ιονύσιος Βυζάντιος, Dionysios Byzantios Latin Dionysius Byzantinus) was a Greek geographer of the 2nd century CE.

He is known for his Ανάπλους Βοσπόρου Anaplous Bosporou Voyage through the Bosporus or De Bospori navigatione, which describes the coastline of the Bosporus and the city of Byzantium (later Constantinople and now İstanbul), described by C. Foss as "one of the most remarkable and detailed of ancient geographic texts". (in Talbert, p. 785)

The work survives with a large lacuna, which is only known from a 16th-century Latin paraphrase by Petrus Gyllius.

== Bibliography ==
- Dionysios of Byzantium, Anaplous of the Bosporos English translation by Brady Kiesling
- Margarethe Billerbeck, Dionysios von Byzanz, Anaplus Bospori. Die Fahrt auf dem Bosporos. Einleitung, Text, Übersetzung und Kommentar, Schwabe, 2023, ISBN 978-3-7965-4846-8 (introduction, edition, translation and commentary).
- Albrecht Dihle, Greek and Latin Literature of the Roman Empire: From Augustus to Justinian, Routledge, 1994, p. 235. ISBN 0-415-06367-1
- Rudolf Güngerich, ed., Anaplus Bospori/De Bospori navigatione. Latin & Greek, Weidmann, 1927 (reprinted 1958).
- Richard J. A. Talbert, Barrington atlas of the Greek and Roman world: Map-by-map Directory, Princeton, 2000. ISBN 0-691-04945-9.
