= Tiryns (mythology) =

In Greek mythology, Tiryns (Ancient Greek: Τίρυνθα) was an Argive prince as the son of King Argus and possibly Evadne, daughter of the river-god Strymon and Neaera. He was probably the brother of Ecbasus, Peiras, Epidaurus and Criasus. The city of Tiryns was named after him.
