= Olympian 6 =

Olympian 6, 'For Hagesias of Syracuse', is an ode by the 5th century BC Greek poet Pindar.

== Background ==
Hagesias was a citizen of Syracuse, descended from an Iamid (associated with Archias in founding that city in 734). He was thus a descendant of Iamus, the son of Apollo. He was also a citizen of Stymphalus in Arcadia. In Sicily he was a partisan of Hieron, and his success at Olympia was viewed with envy in Syracuse (74). The Ode was accordingly sung among the more generous citizens of his Arcadian home (7). It was sent by Pindar from Thebes to Stymphalus by the hands of Aeneas, who trained the chorus for its performance in Arcadia, prior to the return of Hagesias to Syracuse.

The date may be as early as 476 or as late as 472, the earliest and the latest Olympic festivals, held during the rule of Hieron. Pindar's stay in Sicily has been assigned to 476 and 475 BC, and 472 is consistent with the poet's presence in Thebes. 468 is proposed by Boeckh. "Aetnaean Zeus" in line 96 may imply a reference to the founding of Aetna in 476, and is consistent with either of the above dates.

== Summary ==
The poem must have a splendid portal (1–4). Hagesias has many claims to distinction (4–9). There is no glory in achievements involving no risk (9–11). As seer and warrior, the victor resembles Amphiaraüs (12–18). Though the poet is not contentious, he is ready to swear to the truth of his praises of the victor (19–21). The charioteer is bidden to yoke mules to the car of song, that the poet may at once reach the story of the origin of the family (22–27).

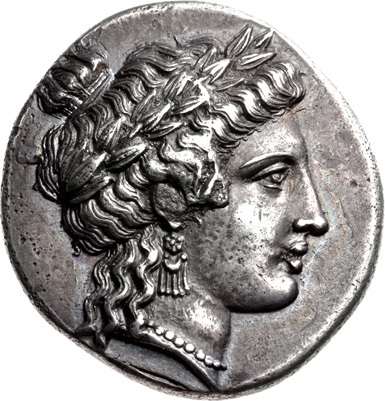
Stater of Stymphalus, c. 350 BC. Artemis (obv.)

The myth of Euadne (28–34), and the myth of her son, Iamus (35–57). Iamus, when he comes of age, invokes Poseidon and Apollo (57–61), and Apollo summons him to Olympia, and grants the gift of divination to himself and his seed (64–70). The fame and the wealth of the Iamids (71–73).

The victory of Hagesias is due to Zeus and his ancestral god, Hermes Enagonius of Arcadia (77–78). Thebes and Arcadia are mythologically connected (82–87). The poet at Thebes addresses his messenger, Aeneas, the trainer of the chorus (87–91), sending a message to Syracuse, and praising Hieron (92–97) who, the poet hopes, will welcome the chorus, when it passes from Stymphalus to Syracuse, from one of the victor's homes to the other (98–100). Two anchors are safest during a stormy voyage (101). May the citizens of both places be blest (101 f), and may Poseidon grant the victor a safe journey to Syracuse, and also prosper the poet's song.

== English translations ==
- Olympian 6, translated into English verse by C. A. Wheelwright (1846)
- Olympian 6, translated into English prose by Ernest Myers (1874)

== See also ==
- Chariot racing

== Sources ==
Attribution:

- Sandys, John, ed. (1915). The Odes of Pindar, including the Principal Fragments. Loeb Classical Library. New York: The Macmillan Co. pp. 52–67.
