= Criasus =

Former king of Argos, Peloponnese

In Greek mythology, Criasus (/ˈkraɪ.əsəs/; Ancient Greek: Κρίασος, romanized: Kriasos, lit. 'of the ram' or 'belonging to the ram') was a king of Argos.

== Family ==
Criasus was the son of Argus and Evadne (daughter of Strymon) or the Oceanid Peitho. He had five brothers who were named Ecbasus, Jasus, Peiranthus, Epidaurus and Tiryns. Criasus fathered Phorbas, Ereuthalion and Cleoboea by Melantho.

== Mythology ==
Criasus was said to have reigned for fifty four years. During his reign, Callithyia, daughter of Peiranthus, became the first priestess of Hera. According to Eusebius, Criasus reigned at the same time as Saphrus reigned as the fourteenth king of Assyria, and Orthopolis as the twelfth king of Sicyon. Eusebius also tells us that Moses was born in Egypt during his reign. Criasus' son Phorbas succeeded him on the throne of Argos.

Regnal titles
Preceded by Argus	King of Argos	Succeeded by Phorbas
