= Phorbas (king of Argos) =

In Greek mythology, Phorbas (Ancient Greek: Ancient Greek: Φόρβας, gen.: Φόρβαντος, lit. 'giving pasture') or Phorbaceus was the sixth king of Argos.

== Family ==
Phorbas was given two different parentage and progeny by various sources. According to scholia on Euripides, his parents were Criasus and Melantho (Melantomice), brother of Ereuthalion and Cleoboea and father of Arestor and Triopas by Euboea. While Pausanias stated that Phorbas was the son of Argus, brother of Peirasus and possibly Tiryns and Epidaurus as they were sons of Argus. His mother in the latter case maybe Evadne, daughter of river god Strymon. In which case, both authors agree that he had a son Triopas who also became a king after him. Another son, Pellen (Pelles) was credited to be the founder of the city of Pellene in Achaea.

Comparative table of Phorbas' family
Relation	Names	Sources	
Relation	Names	Euripides	Pausanias
Relation	Names	Sch. on PW	Pausanias
Parents	Criasus and Melantho	✓	
Parents	Argus		✓
Sibling	Ereuthalion	✓	
Sibling	Cleoboea	✓	
Sibling	Peirasus		✓
Sibling	Tiryns		✓
Sibling	Epidaurus		✓
Wife	Euboea	✓	
Children	Arestor	✓	
Children	Triopas	✓	✓
Children	Pellen		✓

== Reign ==
According to Tatiānus, he may have been a king of Argos himself, succeeding either Argus or Criasus. Eusebius included him in the list of kings of Argos, in which he reigned for thirty five years and was succeeded by Triopas. He was a contemporary of Actaeus, the first king of Attica who named the country after himself, Actaea. During Phorbas' reign, Cecrops Diphyes became the first king of the Athenians.

Regnal titles
Preceded by Criasus	King of Argos	Succeeded by Triopas

PHORBAS' CHRONOLOGY OF REIGN ACCORDING TO VARIOUS SOURCES
Kings of Argos	Regnal Years		Castor	Regnal Years		Syncellus	Regnal Years	Tatian	Regnal Years	Pausanias
Precessor	1569.5	54 winters & summers	Criasus	1567	54 winters & summers	Criasus	1575	Criasus	1600	Argus
Phorbas	1542.5	35 winters & summers	Phorbas	1539.5	25 winters & summers	Phorbas	1550	Phorbas	1575	Phorbas
Successor	1525	46 winters & summers	Triopas	1527	36 winters & summers	Triopas	1525	Triopas	1550	Triopas
