= Triopas of Argos =

Greek mythological character

In Greek mythology, Triopas (/ˈtraɪəpəs/) or Triops (/ˈtraɪ.əps, ˈtraɪˌɒps/; Ancient Greek: Τρίωψ, gen.: Τρίοπος) was the seventh king of Argos. Triopas may be an aspect of the Argive Zeus (sometimes represented with a third eye on his forehead), or may be his human representative.

== Etymology ==
The name's popular etymology is "he who has three eyes" (from τρι- "three" + -ωπ- "see") but the ending -ωψ, -οπος suggests a Pre-Greek origin.

== Family ==
Triopas belonged to the house of Phoroneus of Argos. According to Hyginus' Fabulae, he was the son of Piranthus and Callirhoe, brother of Argus and Arestorides and the father by Oreasis (Oreaside) of Xanthus and Inachus (probably Iasus). Eurisabe, Anthus, Pelasgus and Agenor were probably Triopas' sons when we took into account that Iasus was always called the brother of Pelasgus and Agenor even though their parentage was differently given. Alternatively, Triopas was also called the son of Phorbas and Euboea, brother of Arestor and father again of Pelasgus, Iasus, Agenor and a daughter Messene. In the latter case, among these children, the eldest were the twins Pelasgus and Iasus who were mothered by Sosis.

Comparative table of Triopas' family
Relation	Names	Source		
Relation	Names	Scholia on Euripides	Hyginus	Pausanias
Parentage	Phorbas and Euboea	✓		
Parentage	Piranthus and Callirhoe		✓	
Parentage	Phorbas			✓
Siblings	Arestor or Arestorides	✓	✓	
Siblings	Argus		✓	
Wife	Sosis	✓		
Wife	Oreaside		✓	
Children	Pelasgus	✓	✓	✓
Children	Iasus	✓		✓
Children	Xanthus		✓	
Children	Inachus		✓	
Children	Eurisabe		✓	
Children	Anthus		✓	
Children	Agenor		✓	✓
Children	Messene			✓

== Reign ==
According to Eusebius, Triopas reigned for 46 years, in which Prometheus, Epimetheus, Atlas and Io lived during this time. He succeeded either his father Piranthus or Phorbas to the throne of Argos and was in turn replaced either by his son Iasus or Agenor, or by his grandson Crotopus (son himself of Agenor). Triopas was a contemporary of the autochthon Cecrops, first king of Athens and Marathonius, the thirteenth king of Sicyon.

Regnal titles
Preceded by Phorbas	King of Argos	Succeeded by Iasus

Chronology of Triopas' reign
Kings of Argos	Regnal Years		Castor	Regnal Years		Syncellus	Regnal Years	Hyginus	Pausanias	Regnal Years	Tatian
Predecessor	1542.5	35 winters & summers	Phorbas	1539.5	25 winters & summers	Phorbas	1575	Peranthus	Peirasus or Phorbas	1550	Phorbas
Triopas	1525	46 winters & summers	Triopas	1527	36 winters & summers	Triopas	1550	Triopas	-do-	1525	Triopas
Successor	1502	21 years	Crotopus	1509	24 winters & summers	Crotopus	1525	Agenor or Iasus	Agenor or Iasus	1500	Crotopus
