= Cephalus (son of Deion) =

Prince in Greek mythology

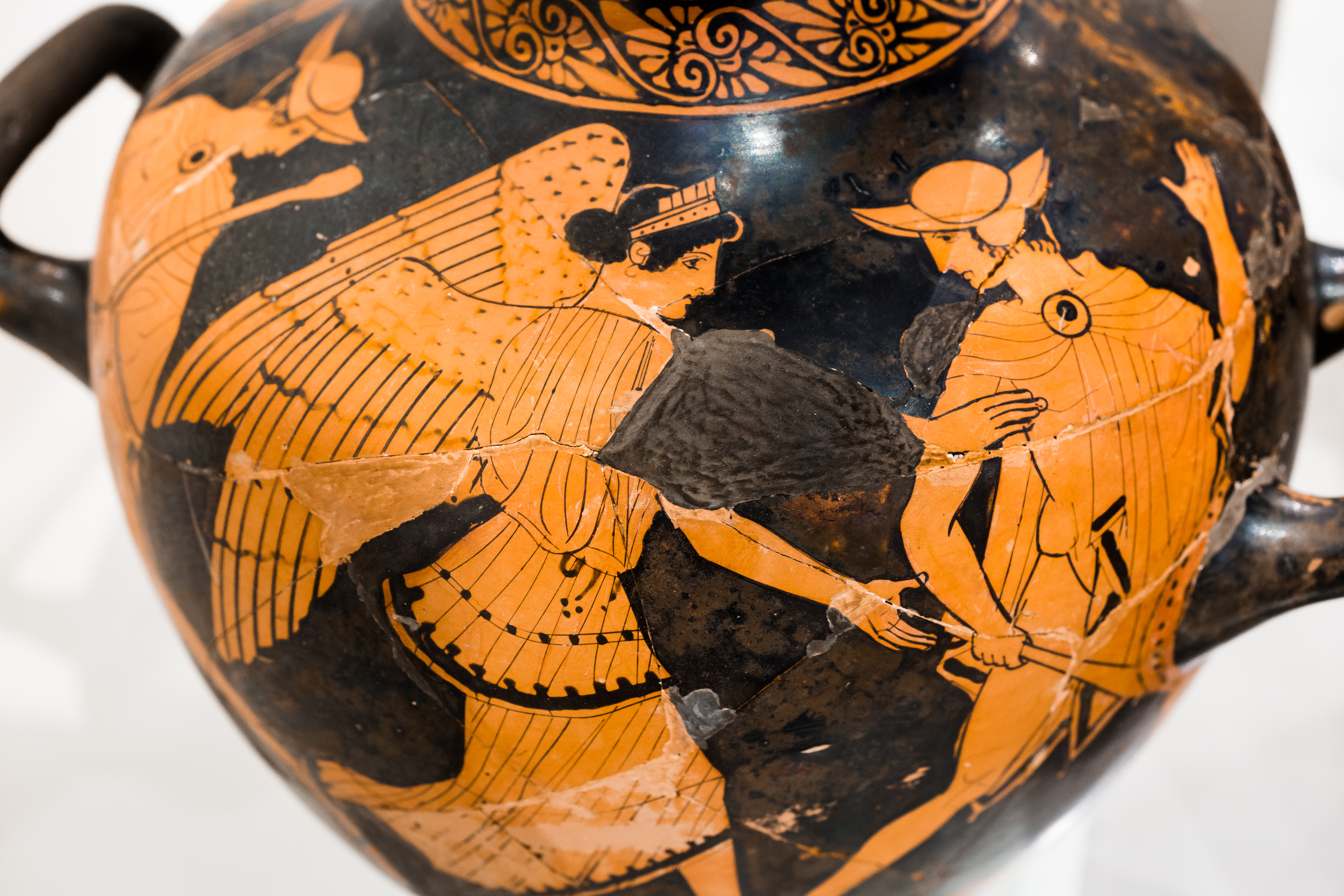
Cephalus chased by the goddess Eos on an Attic red-figure hydria by the Niobid Painter, c. 460-450 BC, kept in the National Archaeological Museum of Greece.

In Greek mythology, Cephalus or Kephalos (/ˈsɛfələs/; Ancient Greek: Κέφαλος, romanized: Képhalos) was the son of Deion, the ruler of Phocis, and Diomede.

== Etymology ==
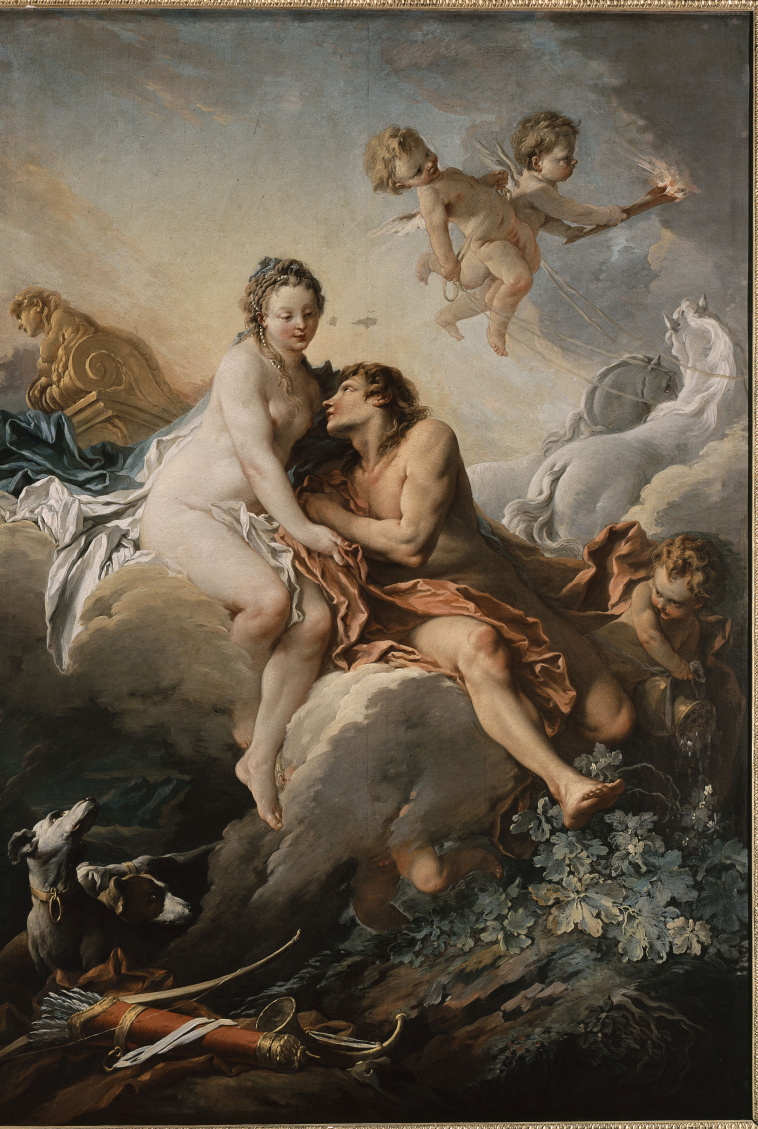
Aurora and Cephalus, 1733, by François Boucher

The word kephalos is Greek for "head", perhaps used here because Cephalus was the founding "head" of a great family that includes Odysseus. It could be that Cephalus means the head of the Sun who kills (evaporates) Procris (dew) with his unerring ray or 'javelin'.

Sumptuous sacrifices for Cephalus and for Procris are required in the inscribed sacred calendar of Thorikos in southern Attica, dating perhaps to the 430s BCE and published from the stone in 1983.

== Genealogy ==
Cephalus was the offspring of Deion of Aeolia, king of Phocis as his father; his mother was Diomede, daughter of Xuthus. Cephalus was the brother of Aenetus, Phylacus, Actor and Asterodia. He was the grandson of King Aeolus of Aeolia.

Through a union with either Princess Procris of Athens or Princess Procne of Athens, he was the father of Arcesius or Archius. By Clymene of Orchomenus, daughter of King Minyas, he was the father of Iphiclus and Alcimede.

In some accounts, he was the father of Oia, wife of Charops and eponym of the deme Oia in Attica. Canes was said to be a son of Cephalus and a king of Phocis; Canes was the husband of Evadne, daughter of Pelias.

According to a scholium on Callimachus, he was one of the lovers of the dawn goddess Eos.

== Mythology ==
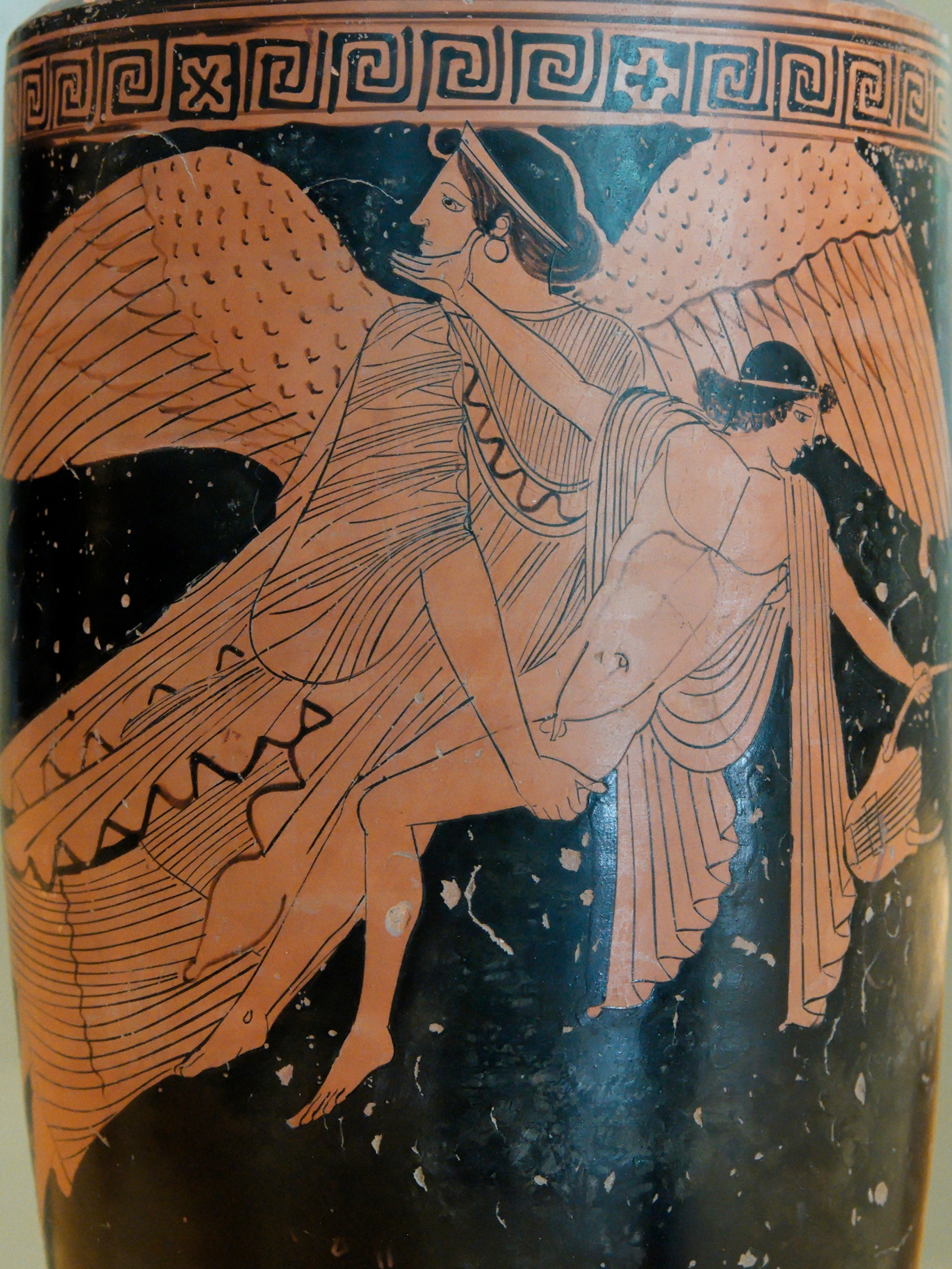
Eos carries off Cephalus, on an Attic red-figure lekythos, ca. 470–460 BCE

=== Cephalus and Procris ===
Athenians localised the myth by asserting that Cephalus was married to Procris, a daughter of Erechtheus, an ancient founding-figure of Athens. The goddess of dawn, Eos, fell in love with him and kidnapped Cephalus against his will when he was hunting. Eos bore the resistant Cephalus a son named Phaethon (not to be confused with the son of the sun-god Helios). Some sources also give Tithonos and Hesperus as children of Cephalus and Eos. However, Cephalus never accepted Eos, and always pined for Procris, causing a disgruntled Eos to return him to her, making disparaging remarks about his wife's fidelity. Bribed by a golden crown, his wife admitted Pteleon to her bed, and being detected by Cephalus she fled to Minos. Alternatively, Eos disguised Cephalus as a common man, who then propositioned Procris. Procris at first refused, but eventually gave in, whereupon the hurt Cephalus revealed himself, causing Procris to flee.

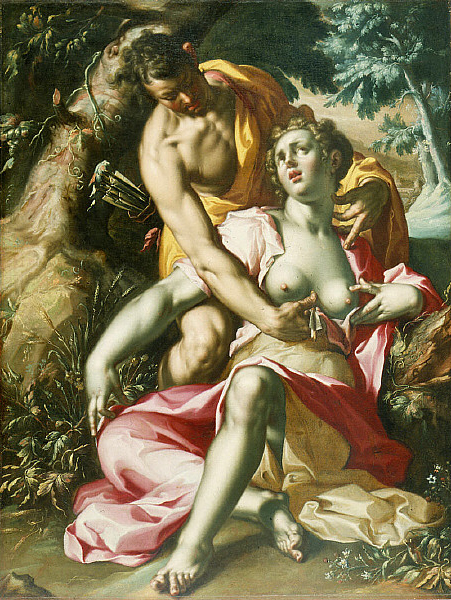
The Death of Procris by Joachem Wtewael (circa 1595–1600)

Procris later on came back to Athens, and once reunited with her after an interval of eight years, Cephalus tested her by returning from the hunt in disguise, and managing to seduce her. In shame Procris fled to the forest, to hunt with Artemis. In returning and reconciling, Procris brought two magical gifts, an inerrant javelin that never missed its mark, and a hunting hound, Laelaps that always caught its prey. The hound met its end chasing a fox (the Teumessian vixen) which could not be caught; both fox and the hound were turned into stone. But the javelin continued to be used by Cephalus, who was an avid hunter. Procris then conceived doubts about her husband, who left his bride at the bridal chamber and climbed to a mountaintop and sang a hymn invoking Nephele, "cloud". Procris became convinced that he was serenading a lover. She climbed to where he was to spy on him. Cephalus, hearing a stirring in the brush and thinking the noise came from an animal, threw the never-erring javelin in the direction of the sound – and Procris was impaled. As she lay dying in his arms, she told him "On our wedding vows, please never marry Eos". Cephalus was distraught at the death of his beloved Procris, and went into exile in Thebes.

The primary literary source for the story is the poet Pherecydes of Athens, preserved in a quoted fragment (Pherecydes Fr. 34) in the so-called "Mythographus Homericus"; a papyrus (PBerolinensis 13282) representing a parallel text based on the same source confirms the details.

=== Amphitryon's campaign ===
In a separate episode that is simply an aition explaining the name of Cephallenia and reinforcing its cultural connections with Athens, Cephalus helped Amphitryon of Mycenae in a war against the Taphians and Teleboans. He was awarded with the island of Samos, which thereafter came to be known as Cephallenia. The people who lived on Cephallenia and nearby islands came to be known as Cephallenians.

Cephalus eventually married again, choosing a daughter of Minyas to be his wife. This woman (named Clymene, according to some sources) had a son with him named Arcesius. In another version, Cephalus consulted an oracle, and the oracle told him that if he wished to have a son, he should mate with the first female being he saw. Cephalus then encountered a she-bear, and mated with the animal. She then transformed into a human woman and gave birth to Arcesius. Arcesius succeeded Cephalus as ruler of his Cephallenian realm. This Arcesius was sometimes said to be the grandfather of Odysseus. In another version he had four sons after which four cities were named: Same, Crane, Pali, Pronnoi. These are the cities who later became the four city-states of Cephallenia. Nevertheless, Cephalus never forgave himself over the death of Procris, and he committed suicide by leaping from Cape Leucas into the sea (in another version, he leapt out of love for Pterelas, the king of the Taphians who was killed in the war in which he participated and whose kingdom he received as a reward).

== In literature ==
The legend of Cephalus and Procris figures twice in Ovid: in the third book of Ars Amatoria and in the seventh book of the Metamorphoses. It is retold in Cephalus and Procris; Narcissus, a 1595 poem by Thomas Edwards. It is echoed in Shakespeare's A Midsummer Night's Dream (Act V, scene i), where Pyramus and Thisbe refer to "Shafalus" and "Procrus", while Milton's "the Attic boy" in Il Penseroso is also a reference to Cephalus.

Operatic treatments include Caccini's Il rapimento di Cefalo (c. 1600), André Grétry's Céphale et Procris (1773), and Ernst Krenek's Cefalo e Procri (1934), as well as works by Hidalgo (1660), Élisabeth Jacquet de La Guerre (1694), and Johann Philipp Krieger (1690).
