= Sose (mythology) =

Two figures in Greek mythology

In Greek mythology, Sose (Ancient Greek: Σώση, romanized: Sṓsē, lit. 'safe, secure' from sôs) or Sosis (Ancient Greek: Σωσίς, romanized: Sōsís) may refer to two distinct characters:

- Sose, a prophetic Arcadian nymph who coupled with Hermes and became the mother of Agreus, one of the Pans, who came to join Dionysus in his campaign against India.
- Sosis, queen of Argos as wife of King Triopas and mother of the twins Pelasgus and Iasus, Agenor and Xanthus.
