= Callithoe =

Callithoe or Kallithoe (Καλλιθόη) is a name in Greek mythology that may refer to:

- Callithoe, a daughter of Celeus
- Callithoe, same as Callithyia (daughter of Peiras)
