= Aex (mythology) =

Ancient Greek mythological figure

In Greek mythology, Aex (Ancient Greek: Αἴξ, romanized: Aix, lit. 'goat'), also called Pine or Cynosura, was, according to Hyginus, a daughter of Olenus, who was a descendant of Hephaestus. Aex and her sister Helice nursed the infant Zeus in Crete, and the former was afterwards changed by the god into the constellation called Capella.

== Mythology ==
According to other traditions mentioned by Hyginus, Aex was a daughter of Melisseus, king of Crete, and was chosen to suckle the infant Zeus; but as she was found unable to do it, the service was performed by the goat Amalthea. Hyginus also reports a tradition that while married to Pan she had a son by Zeus whom she called Aegipan.

According to other authors, Aex was a daughter of Helios and of such dazzling brightness that the Titans in their attack upon Olympus became frightened and requested their mother Gaia to conceal her in the earth. She was accordingly confined in a cave in Crete, where she became the nurse of Zeus. In the Titanomachy, Zeus was commanded by an oracle to cover himself with her skin (aegis). He obeyed the command and raised Aex among the stars.

Similar, though somewhat different accounts, were given by Euemerus and others. It is clear that in some of these stories Aex is regarded as a nymph, and in others as a goat, though the two ideas are not kept clearly distinct from each other. Her name is either connected with αίξ, which signifies a goat, or with άιξ, a gale of wind; and this circumstance has led some critics to consider the myth about her as made up of two distinct ones, one being of an astronomical nature and derived from the constellation Capella, the rise of which brings storms and tempests, and the other referring to the goat which was believed to have suckled the infant Zeus in Crete.
