= Agenor of Argos =

Ancient Greek mythological figure

In Greek mythology, Agenor (/əˈdʒiːnɔːr/; Ancient Greek: Ἀγήνωρ or Αγήνορι Agēnor; English translation: 'heroic, manly') was a member of the royal house of Argos. He belonged to the house of Phoroneus, and was father of Crotopus. His exact position in the lineage varies depending on the source.

== Biography ==
Certain sources give Agenor as a son of Ecbasus, and, in some mythological traditions, father of the giant Argus Panoptes. In other accounts, Agenor was said to have been the son and successor of Triopas, and accordingly brother of Jasus, Xanthus and Pelasgus. Hellanicus of Lesbos states that Agenor was instead a son of Phoroneus, and (again) brother of Jasus and Pelasgus, and that after their father's death, the two elder brothers divided his dominions between themselves in such a manner that Pelasgus received the country about the river Erasmus, and built Larissa, and Jasus the country about Elis. After the death of these two, Agenor, the youngest, invaded their dominions, and thus became king of Argos. Pausanias wrote that because of the enmity of Agenor, Trochilus, son of Callithyia and a priest of Demeter fled from Argos and settled in Attica where he married a woman from Eleusis.

Regnal titles
Preceded by Iasus	King of Argos	Succeeded by Crotopus
