= Iasus (king of Argos) =

In Greek mythology, Iasus (/ˈaɪ.ə.səs/; Ancient Greek: Ἴασος) or Iasius (/aɪˈeɪʒəs/; Ἰάσιος) was a king of Argos.

== Family ==
According to Hellanicus of Lesbos, Phoroneus had at least three sons: Agenor, Jasus (Iasus) and Pelasgus.

According to the mythographer Apollodorus, Iasus was the son of Argus and Ismene (daughter of Asopus) and thus brother of Argus Panoptes. In a Scholia on Euripides' Orestes, Triopas and Sosis are called his parents and Pelasgus is his brother. Pausanias described Iasus as the son of Triopas (son of Phorbas) and brother of Agenor. Generally most scholars agree that Iasus was the father of Io by Leucane. Possibly by the latter, he also fathered Arestor, father of Pelasgus who migrated to Arcadia.

Comparative table of Iasus' family
Relation	Names	Sources						
Relation	Names	Hellanicus	Sch. on Homer	Sch. on Eurip.	Herodotus	Apollodorus	Pausanias	Eustathius
Parentage	Phoroneus	✓	✓					✓
Parentage	Triopas and Sois			✓				
Parentage	Argus				✓			
Parentage	Argus and Ismene					✓		
Parentage	Triopas						✓	
Siblings	Agenor	✓	✓				✓	✓
Siblings	Pelasgus	✓	✓	✓			✓	✓
Siblings	Argus Panoptes					✓		
Siblings	Messene						✓	
Wife	Leucane			✓				
Children	Io			✓	✓	✓	✓	
Children	Arestor			✓				

== Reign ==
After the death of Phoroneus or Triopas, the two elder brothers, Pelasgus and Iasus, divided his dominions between themselves in such a manner that Pelasgus received the country about the river Erasmus, and built Larissa, and Iasus the country about Elis. After the death of these two, Agenor, the youngest, invaded their dominions, and thus became king of Argos. According to Pausanias, he was the successor of his father Triopas on the throne of Argos while his brother Agenor succeeded him as the king afterwards.

Regnal titles
Preceded by Triopas	King of Argos	Succeeded by Agenor, son of Triopas
