= Agreus and Nomios =

Two Greek mythological figures

In Greek mythology Agreus or Argeus (Ancient Greek: Ἀγρεύς, Ἀργεύς, lit. 'hunter' or 'wild') and his brother Nomios or Nomius (Ancient Greek: Νόμιος, lit. 'shepherd' or 'of the pastures') are two of the Pans, creatures multiplied from the god Pan.

== Mythology ==
They are human in shape, but have the horns of goats. Both were the sons of Hermes, Agreus' mother being the nymph Sose, a prophetess: he inherited his mother's gift of prophecy, and was also a skilled hunter. Nomios' mother was the dryad Penelope (not the same as the wife of Odysseus). He was an excellent shepherd, a seducer of nymphs, and musician upon the shepherd's pipes. Agreus and Nomios could also be understood as epithets of Pan, expressing two different aspects of the prime Pan, reflecting his dual nature as both a wise prophet and a lustful beast. Both Agreus (meaning "hunter") and Nomios (meaning "shepherd") are titles of several agricultural gods, including Aristaeus and Pan himself.

Agreus and Nomios joined the dozen sons of the god Pan to help Dionysus in his wars in India.
