= Cleoboea =

Ancient Greek female name

In Greek mythology, the name Cleoboea (Ancient Greek: Κλεόβοια, romanized: Kleóboia, lit. 'renowned cattle') refers to multiple women:

- Cleoboea, daughter of Criasus and Melantho, sister of Phorbas and Ereuthalion.
- Cleoboea, mother of Eurythemis. Her daughter was married to King Thestius of Pleuron in Aetolia. Cleoboea herself is otherwise unknown.
- Cleoboea, mother of Philonis by Eosphoros. Philonis, in her turn, became the mother of Philammon by Apollo.
- Cleoboea, who was said to have been the first to have brought the orgies of Demeter to Thasos from Paros. Pausanias describes a painting which portrays her and Tellis, grandfather of the poet Archilochus, both as young people, on board the boat, with a chest in Cleoboea's hands which is supposed to contain some objects sacred to Demeter.
- Cleoboea or Philaechme, wife of Phobius (a descendant of Neleus) the king of Miletus. She fell in love with the young man named Antheus and tried to seduce him, but he rejected her advances, so she killed him.
