= Sea goat =

Mythical goat-fish hybrid

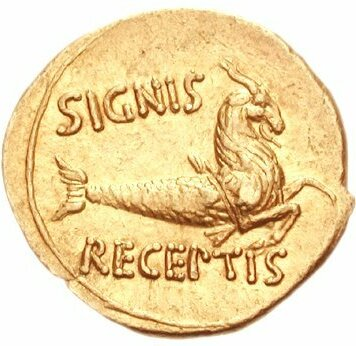
- Roman aureus coin with Capricorn as a sea goat minted in 19 BC by Emperor Augustus

Creature information
- Grouping: Legendary creature
- Sub grouping: Hybrid
- Folklore: Greek mythology, Jewish folklore, Sumerian mythology

Origin
- Habitat: The ocean

The sea goat or goat fish is a legendary aquatic animal described as a creature that is half-goat and half-fish.

== Babylonian goat fish ==
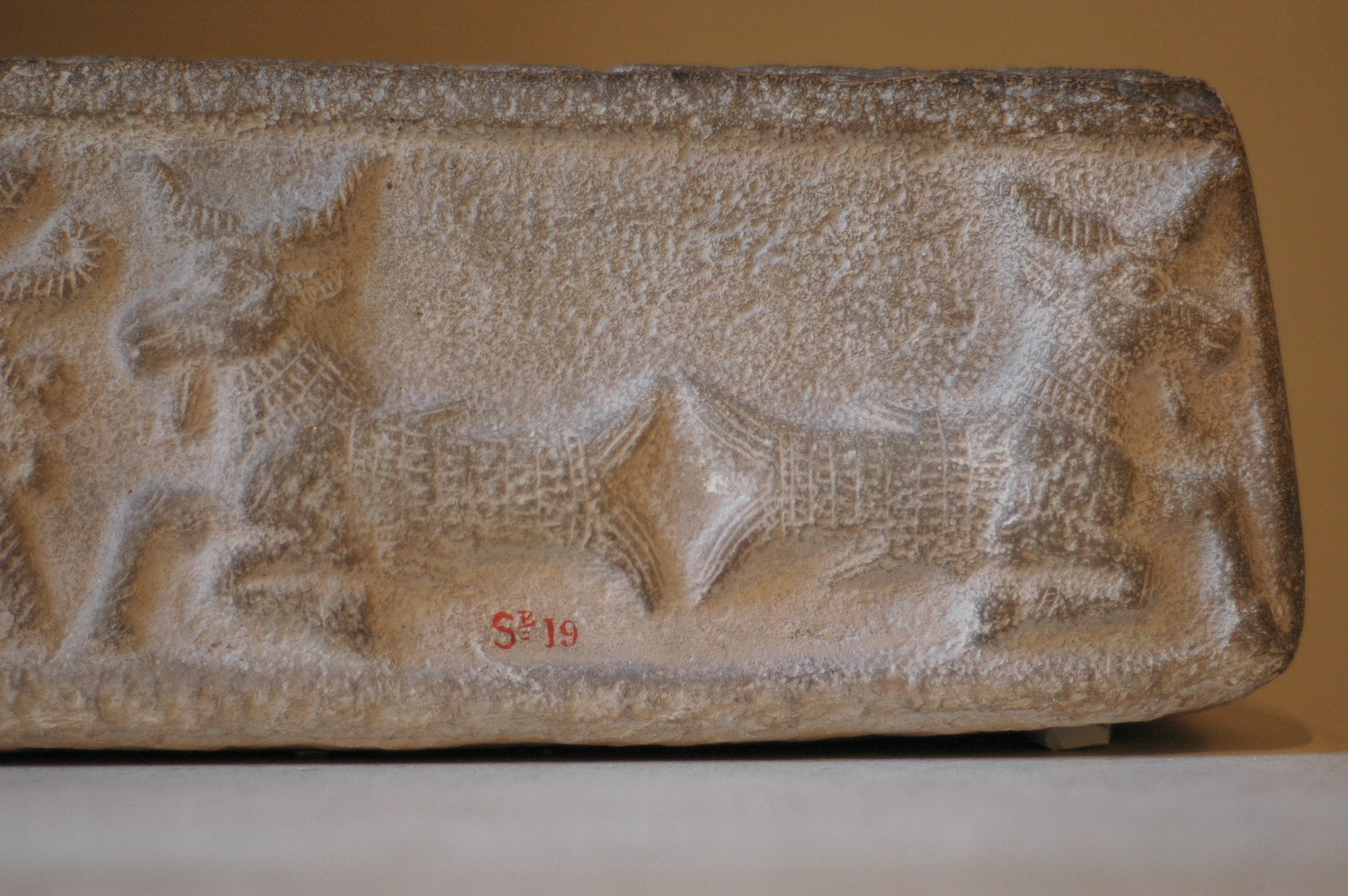
Two goat fish symbolizing the freshwater abyss, domain of the god Ea. On a basin found in Susa, Middle Elamite period (c. 1500 BC – 1100 BC)

The goat fish symbolized the Babylonian god Ea. According to the Babylonian star catalogues the constellation ^{MUL} SUḪUR.MAŠ was 'the goat fish'. This constellation later became the Greek and Roman Capricornus.

== Greek interpretation ==
Greek mythology had two stories regarding the origins of the constellation Capricornus.

One was that the constellation is Amalthea, the goat that raised Zeus. As thanks for caring for him as a child, Zeus placed her amongst the stars.

The other is that Capricornus is the wilderness god Pan. Pan jumped into a river to escape the monster Typhon. He tried to turn himself into a fish, but only his lower half transformed. Zeus fought Typhon and defeated him, but Typhon pulled the muscles out of Zeus' legs. With the help of Hermes, Pan replaced the damaged muscles. As a reward for healing him, Zeus placed Pan in the sky.

The god Aegipan is also sometimes depicted in Greek art as a sea goat.

Imagery found at Aphrodisias, including coins dating back to the 3rd century AD, depict the goddess Aphrodite riding a sea goat.

== Jewish tradition ==
In Jewish oral history, sea goats are mentioned. The story goes that one day all the creatures of the sea must offer themselves to the monster Leviathan. It is reported that a sailor encountered a sea goat while far at sea. On its horns was carved the sentence, translated as "I am a little sea-animal, yet I traversed three hundred parasangs to offer myself as food to the leviathan."

== See also ==
- Hippocampus
- Ichthyocentaurs
- Mermaid
- Myotragus
- Sea-griffin
- Capricornus
- Capricorn (astrology)
