= Canes (mythology) =

In Greek mythology, Canes (Ancient Greek: Κάνῃ means 'basket of reed') was a king of Phocis during the voyage of the Argonauts. His father was Cephalus, son of King Deion and Diomede. Canes married Evadne, daughter of King Pelias of Iolcus. Their marriage was arranged by the hero Jason in compensation for the death of the bride's father.
