= Trochilus (mythology) =

Greek mythological figure and the son of Callithyia

In Greek mythology, Trochilus (Ancient Greek: Τρόχιλος Trókhilos) was a member of the Argive royal house as the son of Princess Callithyia (equated with Io "Callithyessa" in her role of the priestess of the Argive Hera).

== Mythology ==
Some traditions credited either him or his mother with invention of the chariot. Tertullian informs that Trochilus (if indeed it was him, and not Erichthonius, who invented the chariot) was said to have dedicated his creation to Hera. Hyginus and the scholiast on Aratus relate that the constellation Auriga was thought by some to be the stellar image of Trochilus with which he was honored for his invention.

Pausanias wrote that Trochilus was a priest of Demeter and that he had to flee Argos because of the crackdown of Agenor on him and settled in Attica, where he married a woman from Eleusis and became by her father of Triptolemus and Eubuleus.
