= Krotos =

Son of Pan in Greek mythology

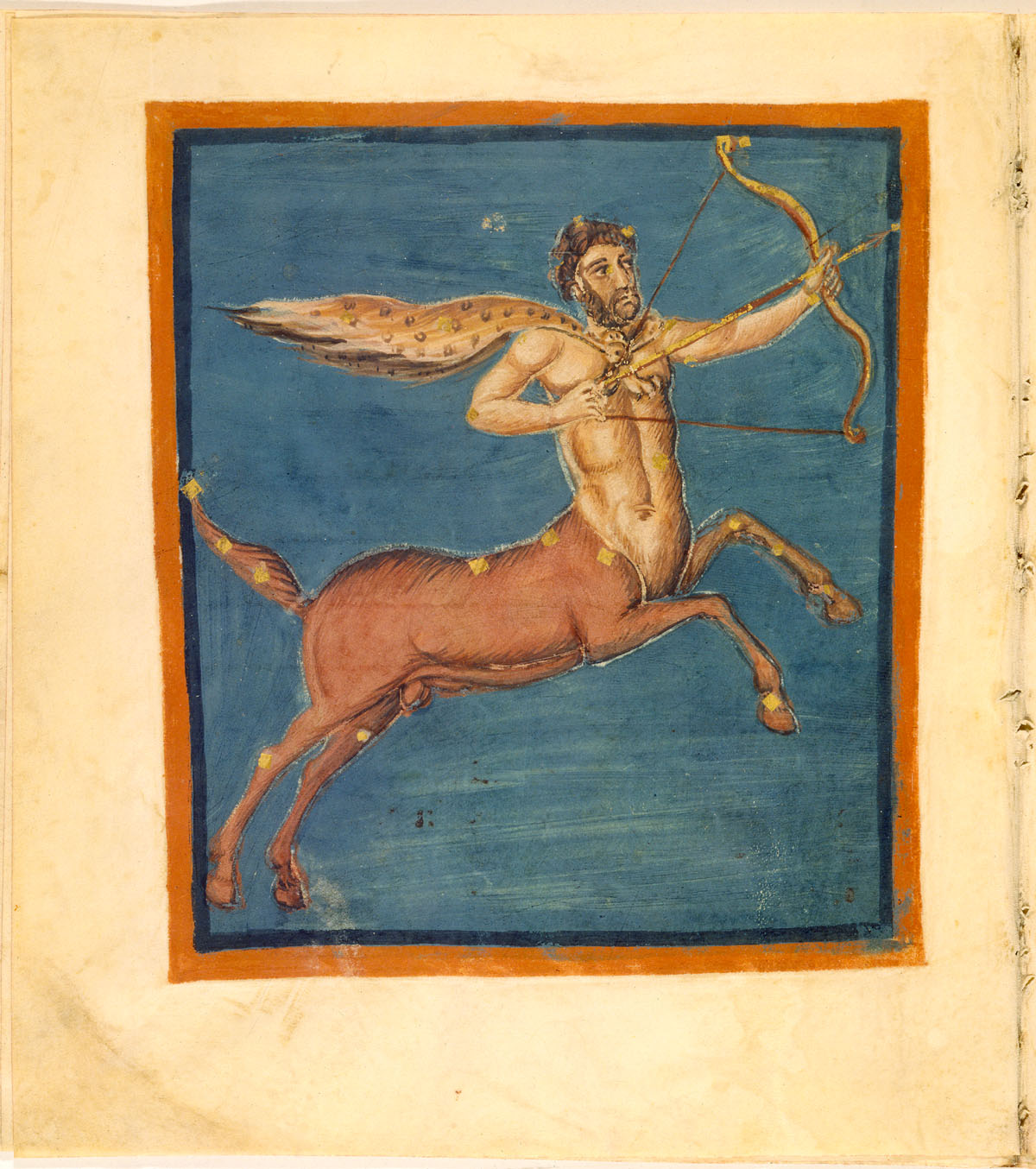
Sagittarius constellation, associated with Krotos (Folio 52v, Leiden Aratea)

In Greek mythology, Krotos or Crotus (Ancient Greek: Κρότος) was the son of Pan and Eupheme. He dwelt on Mount Helicon and kept company of the Muses, whom his mother had nursed.

== Mythology ==
Krotos was renowned for being both an excellent hunter and a devoted adherent of the Muses and their arts. He is credited with having invented archery and being the first to use illumination for hunting animals. He is also said to have introduced applause, as he would clap his hands at the singing of the Muses, for whom this was a sign of acclaim preferable to any verbal ones. To commemorate his diligence, the Muses asked Zeus to place him among the stars, which he did, transforming Krotos into the constellation Sagittarius. Various details of his stellar image were thought to represent one of his virtues: lower body of a horse for his skills of a horse rider; arrows for his keenness and swiftness as a hunter; a satyr's tail for him being as delightful to the Muses as the satyrs are to Dionysus.
