= Pitane (nymph) =

Greek mythological figure

In Greek mythology, Pitane (Ancient Greek: Πιτανη) was the Naiad-nymph of the spring, well or fountain of the town of Pitane (Laconia). She was the daughter of the river god Eurotas, became by Poseidon the mother of Evadne. The town of Pitane was named after her.
