= Pitys (mythology) =

Greek mythological figure

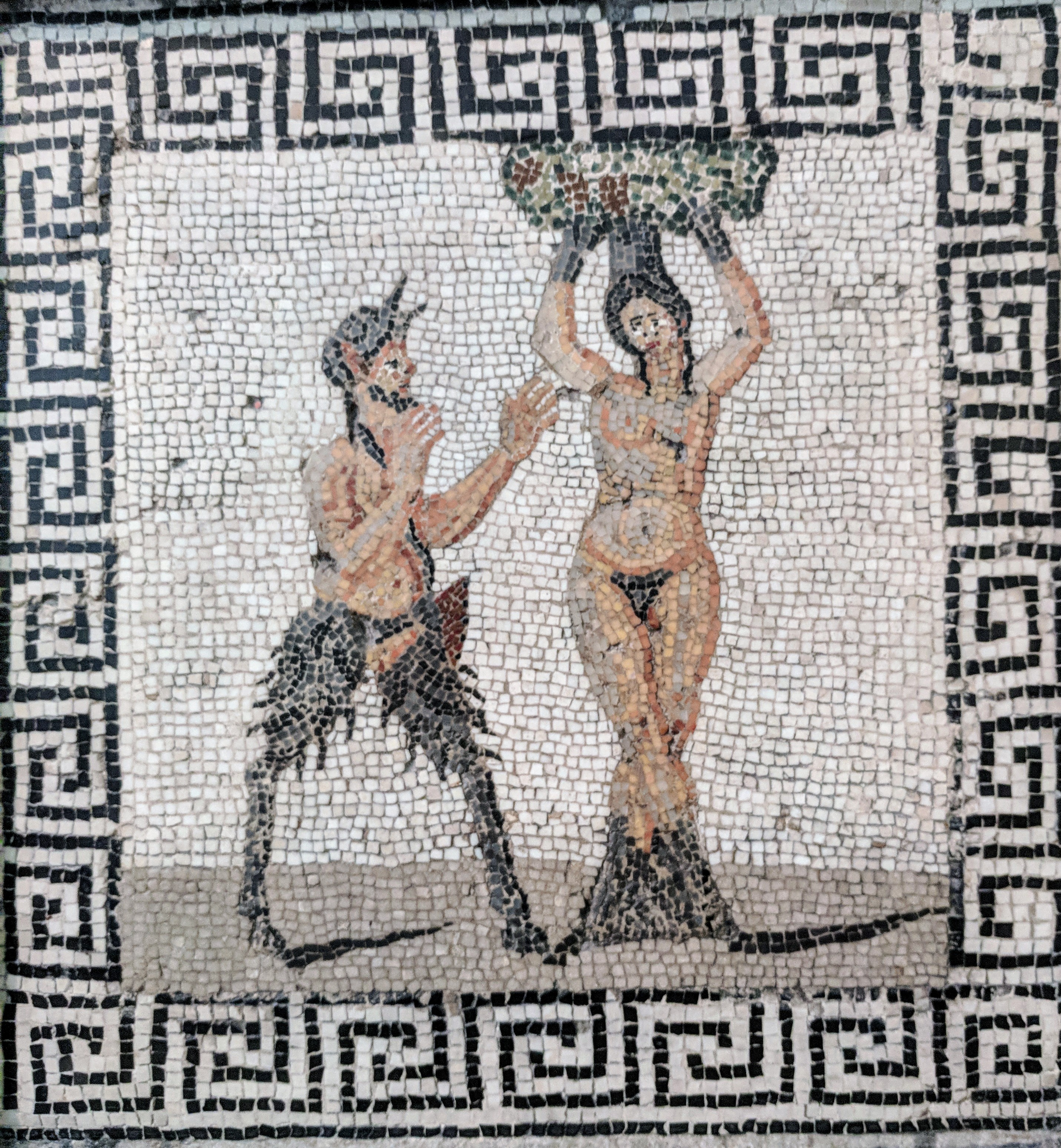
Pan and Pitys mosaic, an eighteenth-century fake now in the National Archaeological Museum of Naples, Italy.

In Greek mythology Pitys (Ancient Greek: Πίτυς, romanized: Pítus, lit. 'pine') is a little-known nymph who was pursued by Pan. Pitys was turned into a pine tree.

== Mythology ==
According to a passage in Nonnus' Dionysiaca (ii.108), she was changed into a pine tree by the gods in order to escape him. Pitys is mentioned in Longus' Daphnis and Chloe (ii.7 and 39) and by Lucian of Samosata (Dialogues of the Dead, 22.4).

Pitys was chased by Pan—as was Syrinx, who was turned into reeds to escape the god who then used her reeds for his panpipes. The flute-notes may have frightened the maenads running from his woodland in a "panic".

In another version, given by the later Greek writer Libanius, both Pan and the north wind Boreas vied for the girl's affections, and tried to make her choose between them. To impress her, Boreas uprooted all the trees with his might. But Pan only laughed, and Pitys choose him instead of Boreas. Angry, Boreas chased Pitys down and threw her off a cliff, killing her. Gaia, pitying the girl, changed her dead body into a pine tree.

The subject is illustrated in paintings of (roughly chronologically) Nicolas Poussin, Jacob Jordaens, François Boucher, William-Adolphe Bouguereau, Annibale Carracci, Andrea Casali, Arnold Bocklin, Sir Lawrence Alma-Tadema, and Maxfield Parrish.

== See also ==
- Daphne
- Oreithyia
- Syrinx
- Arethusa
