= Aegipan =

Ancient Greek mythological figure

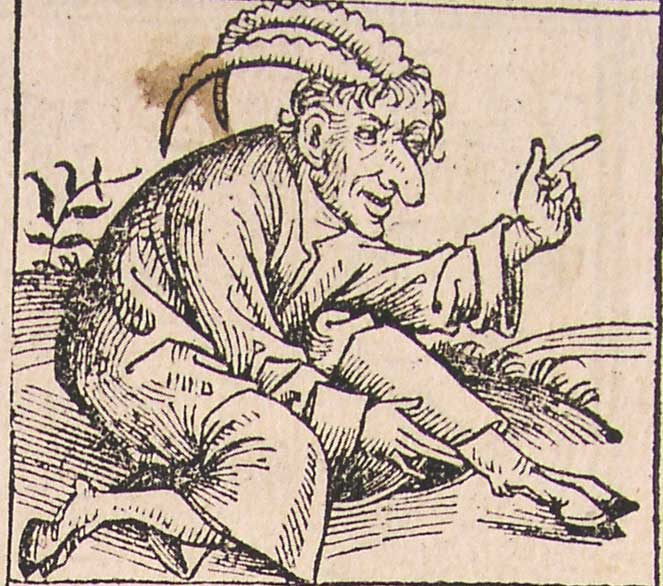
Illustration from the Nuremberg Chronicle (1493)

Aegipan (Ancient Greek: Αἰγίπαν, Αἰγίπανος, "Goat-Pan") was a mythological being, either distinct from or identical to Pan. His story appears to be of late origin.

== Mythology ==
According to Hyginus, Aegipan was the son of Zeus (some sources say his son Apollo) and Aega (also named Boetis or Aix), and was transferred to the stars. Others again make Aegipan the father of Pan, and state that he as well as his son were represented as half goat and half fish, similar to a satyr. In Greek art, Aegipan is thus often depicted as a sea goat, the mythical creature represented by the constellation Capricornus. When Zeus in his contest with Typhon was deprived of the sinews of his hands and feet, Hermes and Aegipan secretly restored them to him and fitted them in their proper places, after stealing them from the Corycian cave where they were being guarded by Delphyne.

According to a Roman tradition mentioned by Plutarch, Aegipan sprang from the incestuous intercourse of Valeria of Tusculum and her father Valerius, and was considered only a different name for Silvanus.

== Literature ==
Later writers such as Pliny the Elder used the terms "Aegipanes", "Aegipans", or "Oegipans" to describe a race of satyr-like wild men said to reside in Libya. This depiction was continued in medieval bestiaries where the terms aegipans and satyrs were sometimes used to describe ape-like or bestial creatures. These are thought to be fanciful descriptions of baboons or monkeys. A reference to oegipans as a species also appears in Edgar Allan Poe's The Fall of the House of Usher and Arthur Machen's The Great God Pan.

== Notes ==
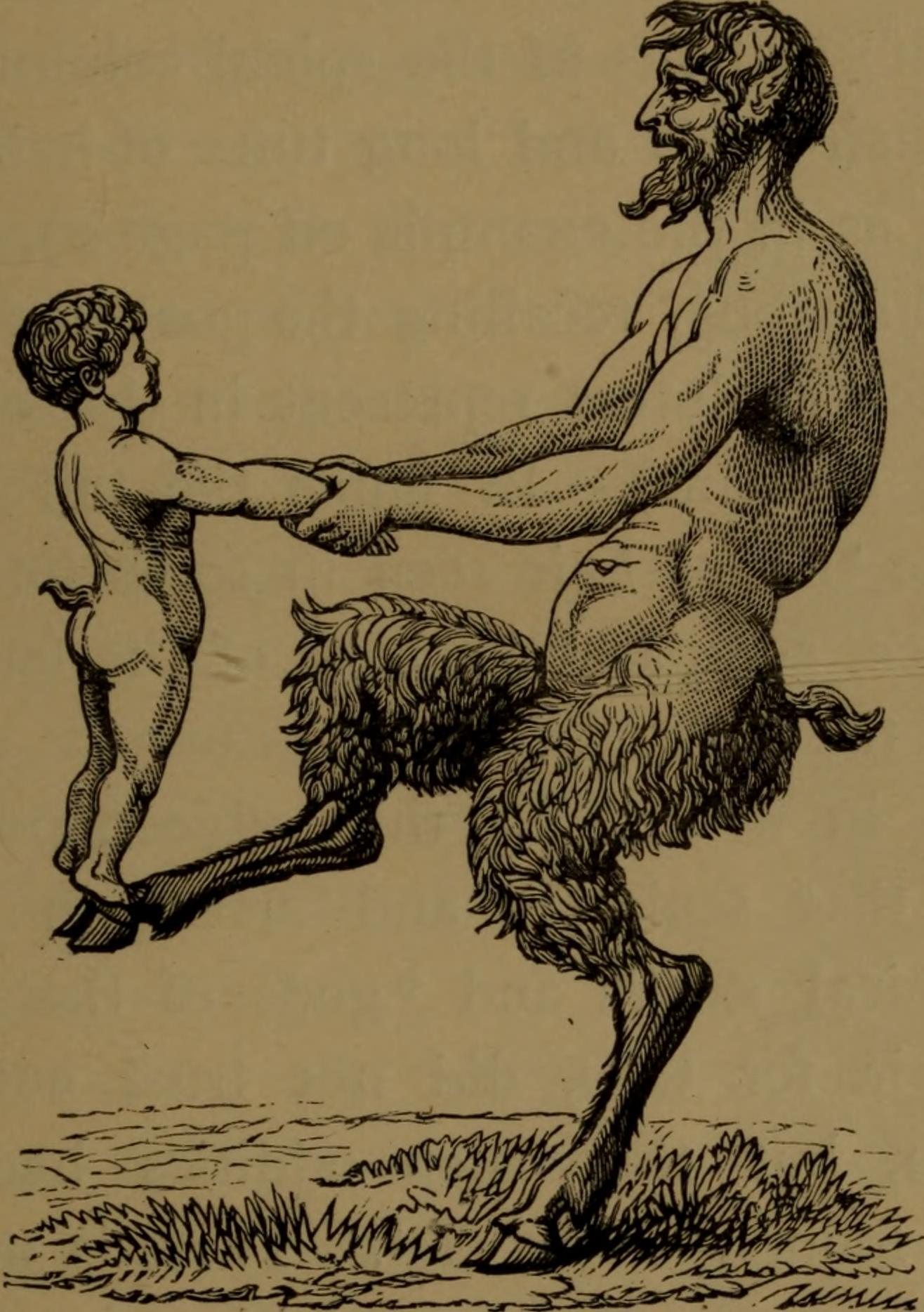
Depiction of an aegipan with a young pan (1890)
