= Ecbasus =

Son of Argus in Greek mythology

In Greek mythology, Ecbasus (Ancient Greek: Έκβασος, romanized: Ékbasos, lit. 'outcoming', 'departure' or 'stepping out') was the son of Argus, the king and eponym of Argos (and son of Zeus and Niobe). According to the mythographer Apollodorus, his mother was Evadne, the daughter of the river god Strymon, and he was the sibling of Criasus, Epidaurus, and Piras. According to a scholion on Euripides, however, his mother was the Oceanid Peitho.

Ecbasus was the father of Agenor, himself the father of Argus Panoptes (the giant who guarded Io). According to the historian Charax, Ecbasus fathered Arestor, whose son, Pelasgus, settled in the region of Arcadia (which was originally known as Pelasgia).
