= Iamus =

Son of Evadne in Greek mythology

In Greek mythology, Iamus (Ancient Greek: Ἴαμος) was the son of Apollo and Evadne, a daughter of Poseidon, raised by Aepytus. In a story told by Pindar, after his mother lies with Apollo and the child is born, he is left in the wilderness. Here he is raised by a pair of snakes, before being found again after Aepytus upon his visit to the Oracle of Delphi. Iamus was later taken to Olympia by his father, who teaches him ability of prophecy.

He was said to be the ancestor of the Iamidae, a family of seers that operated in Olympia.

== Descendants ==
He is said to have been the ancestor of the Iamidae, a lineage of seers that operated in Olympia. Their main method of reading the future was through the use of a sacrificial fire. According to Pausanias, their tomb existed in Sparta; they are also known to have been present in Messene and Mantinea.

== Mythology ==
In the sixth Olympian Ode by the 5th-century BC poet Pindar, Evadne lies with Apollo and becomes pregnant, but is shamed by Aepytus for her pregnancy. When it was time for the child to be born, Apollo sends down Eileithyia and the Moirai (Fates) to assist Evadne. After giving birth, she abandons the child in the wild out of distress. The child survives, as he is nourished by two snakes, who feed him honey ('the harmless venom of bees', Pindar, Olympian Ode 6.46-7, an example of Pindar's use of kenning). When Aepytus learns from the Delphic Oracle that the new born was sired by Apollo himself, and was destined to be a great prophet, he orders for the child to be brought back into the house. The infant is found alive lying among violets, and is named "Iamus" by Evadne.

When he reached his youth, Iamus descended into the waters of Alpheios and invoked Poseidon, his grandfather, and Apollo, his father, asking them to reveal his destiny to him. Only Apollo answered his prayer, and appearing to him, took him to Olympia. There, Apollo taught him the art of prophecy and gave him the power to understand and explain the voices of birds.
