= Penelope (mother of Pan) =

Mother of Pan by Hermes

In Greek mythology, various authors describe Pan as the son of Hermes and Penelope (/pəˈnɛləpiː/ pə-NEL-ə-pee; Greek: Πηνελόπη, Pēnelópē). This Penelope is apparently the same person as Penelope, the wife of Odysseus in the Odyssey. It has been suggested, however, that the Penelope given as Pan's mother was originally a nymph, and a separate figure to Odysseus' wife.

Alternatively, Pindar and Hecataeus state that she is Pan's mother by Apollo, while according to the historian Duris of Samos, the birth of Pan is the result of her sleeping with all of her suitors.

== See also ==
- Coronis (lover of Apollo)
