= Cefalo e Procri =

Opera by Ernst Krenek

- Chamber opera by Ernst Krenek
- Description: Moralità pseudo-classica
- Librettist: Rinaldo Küfferle
- Language: Italian
- Based on: Cephalus and Procris
- Premiere: 15 September 1934; Venice Festival

Cefalo e Procri (Cephalus and Procris) is a chamber opera in three scenes and a prologue by Ernst Krenek, his Op. 77, begun in 1933 and finished on 3 August 1934. The Italian libretto by Rinaldo Küfferle (1903–1955, now remembered for many singing translations from Russian and German into Italian) was commissioned by Universal Edition for the third Venice Festival. The half-hour work was revived at the Gran Teatro La Fenice in Venice in October 2017 as part of a short double-bill with a setting of the 'Lamento di Procri' by Silvia Colasanti, conducted by Tito Ceccherini.

== Background ==
The festival came at a time of great tension between Italy and Germany over assassination attempts on the Italian-backed dictator Engelbert Dollfuß, and Benito Mussolini, who had taken a great interest in the festival, was intent on courting an Austrian composer. Alfredo Casella (perhaps unaware of Der Diktator) was responsible for steering the commission to Krenek.

The half-hour work premiered 15 September 1934 after the original conductor, bewildered by the twelve-tone score, was replaced by Hermann Scherchen. An anticipated companion piece by Honegger never materialized, and the program was shared with Vittorio Rieti's Teresa nel bosco and Antonio Veretti's Una favola di Andersen. Krenek had written to Küfferle to suggest something from Ovid's Metamorphoses, though he seems to have been taken back by Küfferle's choice of subject; perhaps the character of Procris (who was courted in disguise by her husband) was inspired by a production of Così fan tutte at the festival, which also saw the Italian premiere of Die Frau ohne Schatten. Krenek called his work a fable, using not the phrase "favola in musica" but "Moralità pseudo-classica" in homage to the later Italian baroque opera, and set it as a series of arias and recitatives. Audience reaction was lukewarm and the reviews mixed; the loudest ovations were for Küfferle, wearing a fascist uniform.

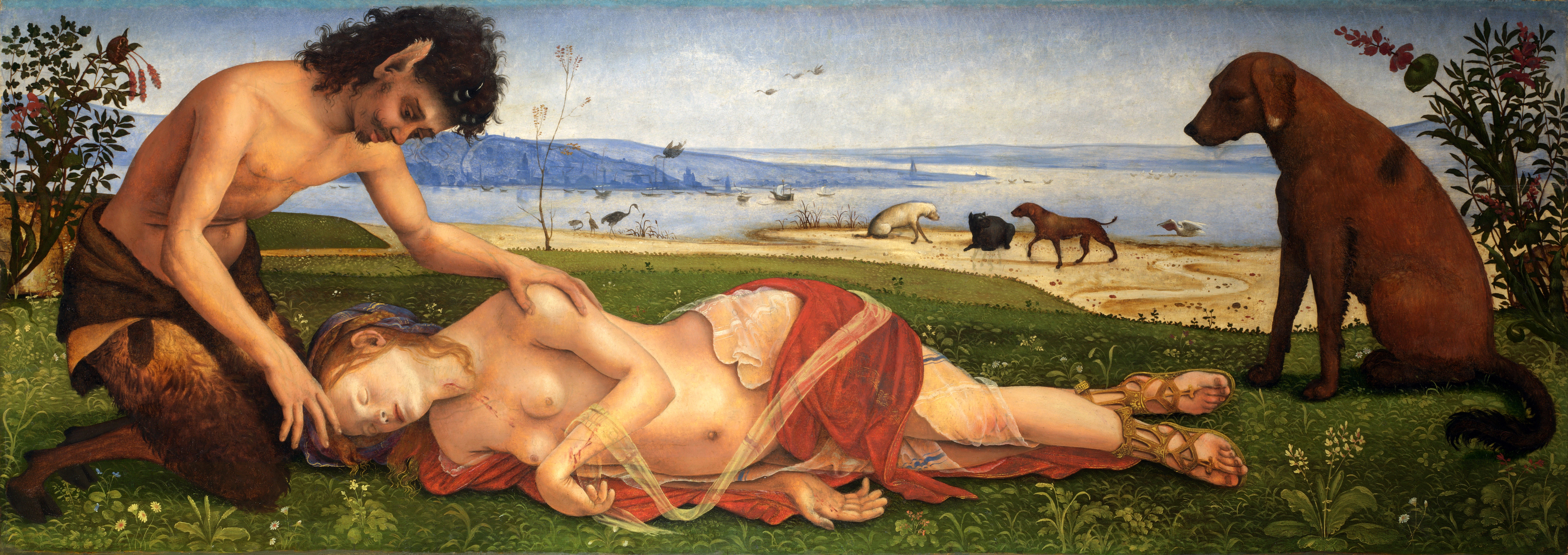
The Death of Procris, by Piero di Cosimo (c. 1486–1510)

== Roles ==
Role	Voice type	Premiere Cast, 15 September 1934 (Conductor: Hermann Scherchen)
Cefalo	tenor	Giovanni Voyer
Procri	soprano	Sara Scuderi
Diana	contralto	Rhea Toniolo
Aurora	soprano	Ines Alfani-Tellini
Crono	baritone	Apollo Granforte

== Critical assessment ==
Stewart gives an unfavorable assessment ("Küfferle should have found some way to leave the dog out"), but does note that Alban Berg liked the score. Krenek himself scarcely ever mentioned his "brief and issueless flight into Italian opera" again.
