= Mythographus Homericus =

Mythographus Homericus, the "Homeric Mythographer", is the unknown writer of a text of tales collected from Greek mythology that are transmitted in two manuscript traditions.

== Writings ==
In one, they are found among those scholia on the works of Homer transmitted in Byzantine manuscripts as the so-called "D-scholia". In the other, recently recovered manuscript tradition, a 3rd-century CE papyrus, conserved at Berlin, of the source or one based on it has provided a parallel text, confirming the text offered by Mythographus Homericus. There are several fragmentary papyri, four of them from Oxyrhynchus, providing additional evidence. They date from the first or second to the fifth century CE; seventy-seven fragments relating to Iliad 18-24 were published in 1995 as P. Oxy. LXI 4096.

In distinction from the texts interspersed among the Homeric D-scholia, where the actual individual authors are submerged in sources that are merely cited as scholia, the papyrus text preserves the original format in which these summary histories were transmitted. They follow the canonic Homeric text, with headwords or lemmata that link them to the relevant Homeric line. Most of them are brief accounts of an episode or etiologies of names, genealogies or explanations of an Homeric term; they do not provide a grammarian's gloss.

== See also ==
- Vatican Mythographers
