= Xanthus (son of Triopas) =

Son of Triopas in Greek mythology

In Greek mythology, Xanthus or Xanthos (/ˈzænθəs/; Ancient Greek: Ξάνθος, from ζανθός, 'yellow, golden yellow', referring to hair) was an Argive prince who later on became king of Pelasgia (i.e. Lesbos).

== Family ==
According to Diodorus Siculus, Xanthus is the son of a Pelasgian king, Triopas of Argos. The Roman Fabulae specifies his mother as Oreaside, and names his brother as Inachus. A scholium on Euripides names his mother, by Triopas, as Sosis.

== Mythology ==
Xanthus colonized a piece of Lycian land, making it his residence in there and became the ruler of the Pelasgians who had accompanied him. Later on, Xanthus crossed over to Lesbos, which was uninhabited, and divided the land among the settlers. He named the island, which had formerly been called Issa, Pelasgia after the people who had settled it.

Seven generations later after the flood of Deucalion had taken place and much of mankind had perished, it came to pass that Lesbos was also laid desolate by the deluge of waters. And after these events Macareus, son of Crinacus, came to the island, and recognizing the beauty of the land, he made his home in it.
