= Pan (god) =

Ancient Greek god of the wilds, shepherds, and flocks

- God of nature, the wild, shepherds, flocks, and mountain wilds
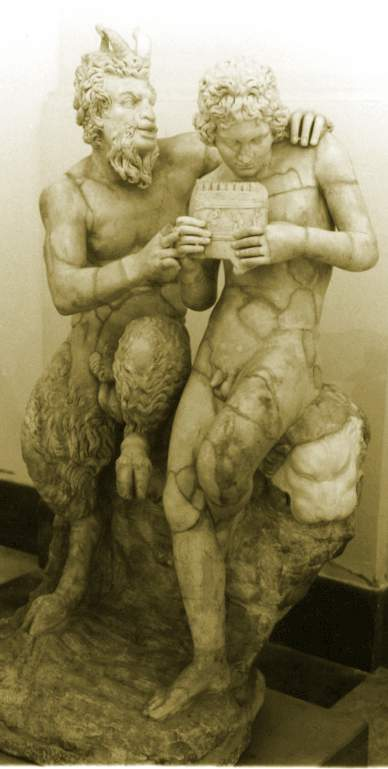
- Pan teaching his eromenos, the shepherd Daphnis, to play his pan flute, Roman copy of Greek original c. 100 BC, found in Pompeii.
- Abode: Arcadia
- Symbol: Pan flute, goat

Genealogy
- Parents: Hermes and a daughter of Dryops, or Penelope
- Consort: Syrinx, Echo, Pitys
- Children: Silenus, Iynx, Krotos, Xanthus (out of Twelve)

Equivalents
- Roman: Faunus; Inuus

In ancient Greek religion and mythology, Pan (/pæn/; Ancient Greek: Πάν, romanized: Pán) is the god of the wild, shepherds and flocks, rustic music and impromptus, and companion of the nymphs. He has the hindquarters, legs, and horns of a goat, in the same manner as a faun or satyr. With his homeland in rustic Arcadia, he is also recognized as the god of fields, groves, wooded glens, and often affiliated with sex; because of this, Pan is connected to fertility and the season of spring.

In Roman religion and myth, Pan was frequently identified with Faunus, a nature god who was the father of Bona Dea, sometimes identified as Fauna; he was also closely associated with Silvanus, due to their similar relationships with woodlands, and Inuus, a vaguely defined deity also sometimes identified with Faunus. In the eighteenth and nineteenth centuries, Pan became a significant figure in the Romantic movement of Western Europe and also in the twentieth-century Neopagan movement.

== Origins ==
Many modern scholars consider Pan to be derived from the reconstructed Proto-Indo-European god *Péh₂usōn, whom they believe to have been an important pastoral deity (*Péh₂usōn shares an origin with the modern English word "pasture"). The Rigvedic psychopomp god Pushan (from PIE zero grade *Ph₂usōn) is believed to be a cognate of Pan. The connection between Pan and Pushan, both of whom are associated with goats, was first identified in 1924 by the German scholar Hermann Collitz. The familiar form of the name Pan is contracted from earlier Πάων, derived from the root *peh₂- (guard, watch over). According to Edwin L. Brown, the name Pan is probably a cognate with the Greek word ὀπάων "companion".

In his earliest appearance in literature, Pindar's Pythian Ode iii. 78, Pan is associated with a mother goddess, perhaps Rhea or Cybele; Pindar refers to maidens worshipping Cybele and Pan near the poet's house in Boeotia.

== Worship ==
The worship of Pan began in Arcadia which was always the principal seat of his worship. Arcadia was a district of mountain people, culturally separated from other Greeks. Arcadian hunters used to scourge the statue of the god if they had been disappointed in the chase.

Being a rustic god, Pan was not worshipped in temples or other built edifices, but in natural settings, usually caves or grottoes such as the one on the north slope of the Acropolis of Athens. These are often referred to as the Cave of Pan. Although there were exceptions like the Sanctuary of Pan on the Neda River gorge in the southwestern Peloponnese, the ruins of which survive to this day, the Temple of Pan at Apollonopolis Magna in ancient Egypt and the sanctuary on the mount Homole in Thessaly. In the fourth century BC Pan was depicted on the coinage of Pantikapaion.

Archaeologists, while excavating a Byzantine church of around 400 AD in Banyas, discovered in the walls of the church an altar of the god Pan with a Greek inscription, dating back to the second or third century AD. The inscription reads, "Atheneon son of Sosipatros of Antioch is dedicating the altar to the god Pan Heliopolitanus. He built the altar using his own personal money in fulfillment of a vow he made."

In the mystery cults of the highly syncretic Hellenistic era, Pan is identified with Phanes/Protogonos, Zeus, Dionysus and Eros.

=== Epithets ===
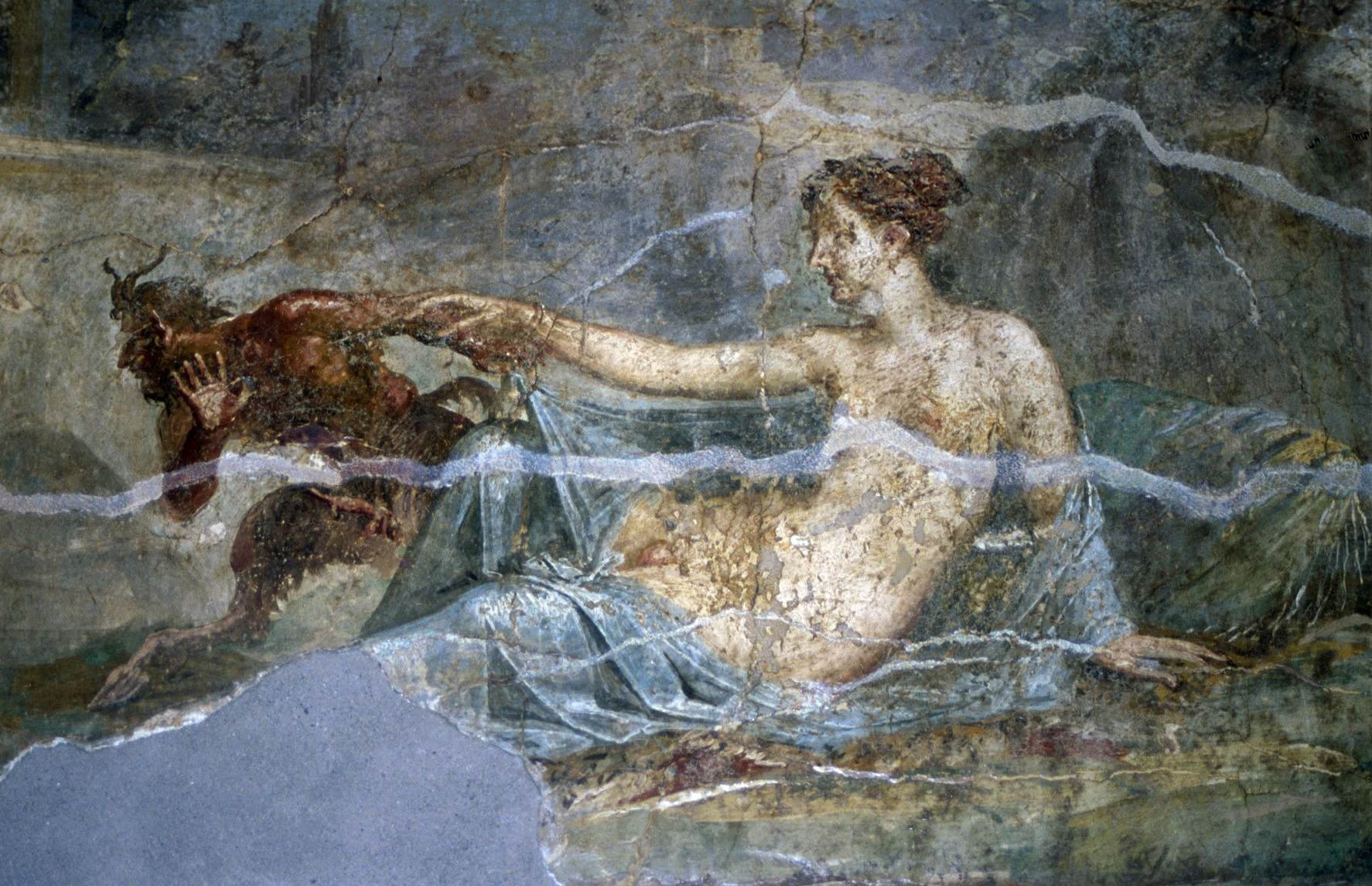
Ancient Roman fresco of Pan and Hermaphroditus from the House of Dioscuri in Pompeii, now in the National Archaeological Museum, Naples

- Aegocerus (Ancient Greek: Αἰγόκερως, romanized: Aigókerōs, lit. 'goat-horned') was an epithet of Pan descriptive of his figure with the horns of a goat.
- Lyterius (Ancient Greek: Λυτήριος), meaning Deliverer. There was a sanctuary at Troezen, and he had this epithet because he was believed during a plague to have revealed in dreams the proper remedy against the disease.
- Maenalius (Ancient Greek: Μαινάλιος) or Maenalides (Ancient Greek: Μαιναλιδης), derived from mount Maenalus which was sacred to the god.

== Parentage ==
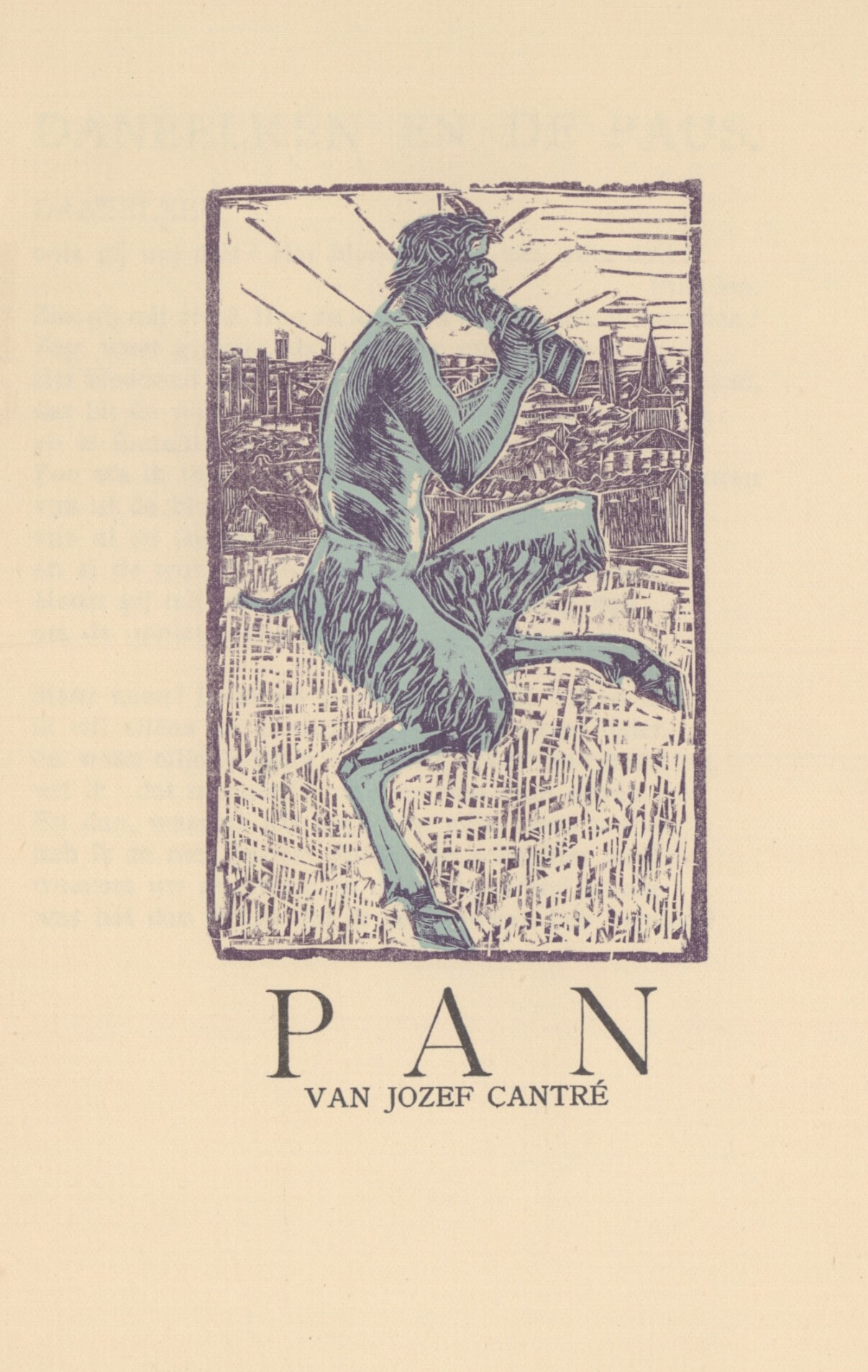
Pan illustrated in the Flemish magazine Regenboog. Draft for the woodcut Pan of Jozef Cantré. Published in 1918.

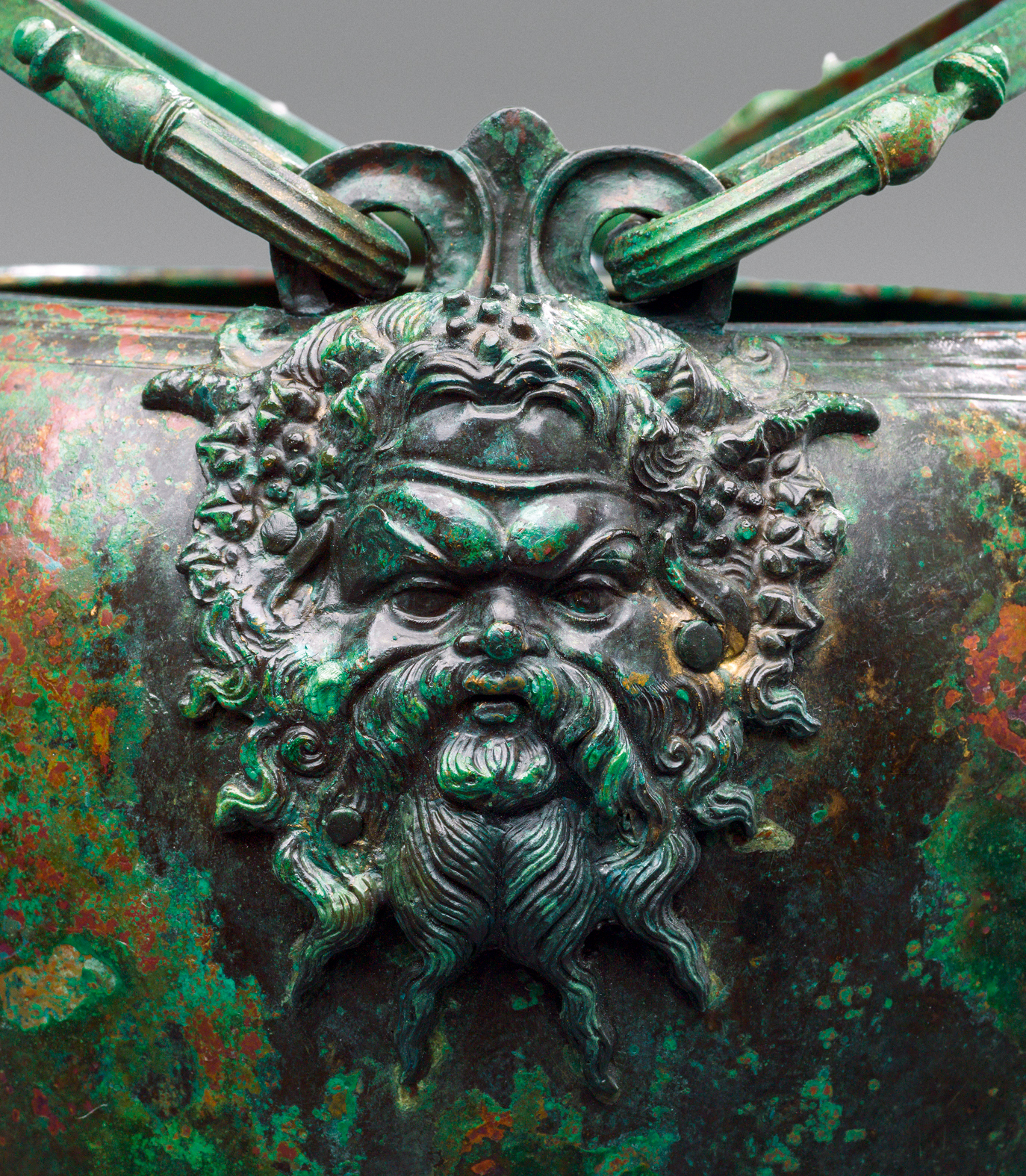
Mask of the god Pan, detail from a bronze stamnoid situla, 340–320 BC, part of the Vassil Bojkov Collection, Sofia, Bulgaria

Numerous parentages are given for Pan by different authors. According to the Homeric Hymn to Pan, he is the child of Hermes and an unnamed daughter of Dryops. Several authors state that Pan is the son of Hermes and "Penelope", apparently Penelope, the wife of Odysseus: according to Herodotus, this was the version which was believed by the Greeks, and later sources such as Cicero and Hyginus call Pan the son of Mercury and Penelope. In some early sources such as Pindar (c. 518 – c. 438 BC) and Hecataeus (c. 550 – c. 476 BC), he is called the child of Penelope by Apollo. Apollodorus records two distinct divinities named Pan; one who was the son of Hermes and Penelope, and the other who had Zeus and a nymph named Hybris for his parents, and was the mentor of Apollo. Pausanias records the story that Penelope had in fact been unfaithful to her husband, who banished her to Mantineia upon his return. Other sources (Duris of Samos; the Vergilian commentator Servius) report that Penelope slept with all 108 suitors in Odysseus' absence, and gave birth to Pan as a result. This myth reflects the folk etymology that equates Pan's name (Πάν) with the Greek word for "all" (πᾶν). According to Smith's Dictionary of Greek and Roman Biography and Mythology, Apollodorus has his parents as Hermes and Oeneis, while scholia on Theocritus have Aether and Oeneis.

Like other nature spirits, Pan appears to be older than the Olympians, if it is true that he gave Artemis her hunting dogs and taught the secret of prophecy to Apollo. Pan might be multiplied as the Pans (Burkert 1985, III.3.2; Ruck and Staples, 1994, p. 132) or the Paniskoi. Kerenyi (p. 174) notes from scholia that Aeschylus in Rhesus distinguished between two Pans, one the son of Zeus and twin of Arcas, and one a son of Cronus. "In the retinue of Dionysos, or in depictions of wild landscapes, there appeared not only a great Pan, but also little Pans, Paniskoi, who played the same part as the Satyrs".

Herodotus wrote that according to Egyptian chronology, Pan was the most ancient of the gods; but according to the version in which Pan was the son of Hermes and Penelope, he was born only eight hundred years before Herodotus, and thus after the Trojan war. (Note: Herodotus was born about 485 BC, so by his reckoning Pan would have been born around 1285—earlier than the Trojan War as estimated by most of the Greek antiquarians, and a century before the date reckoned by Eratosthenes.) Herodotus concluded that that would be when the Greeks first learnt the name of Pan.

== Mythology ==
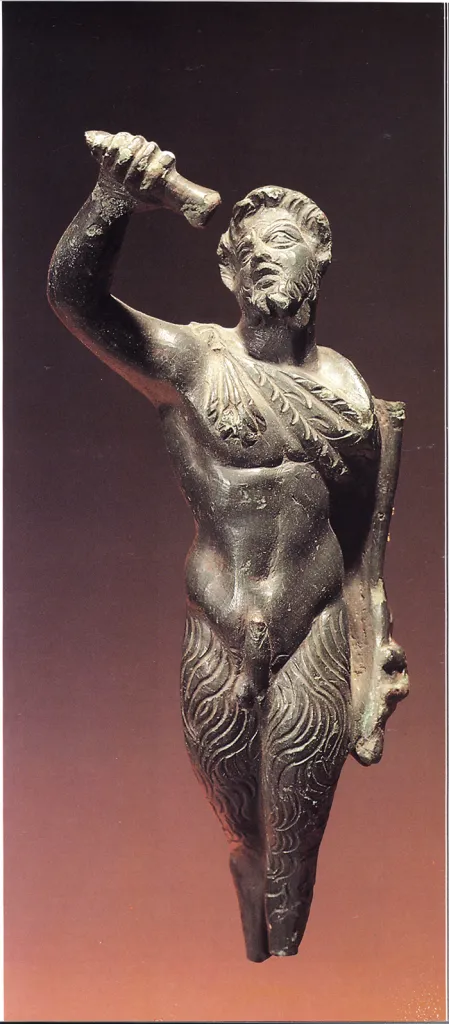
Bronze statuette of Pan dated to the early Hellenistic period (3rd century B.C) unearthed in Butrint, Albania

=== Battle with Typhon ===
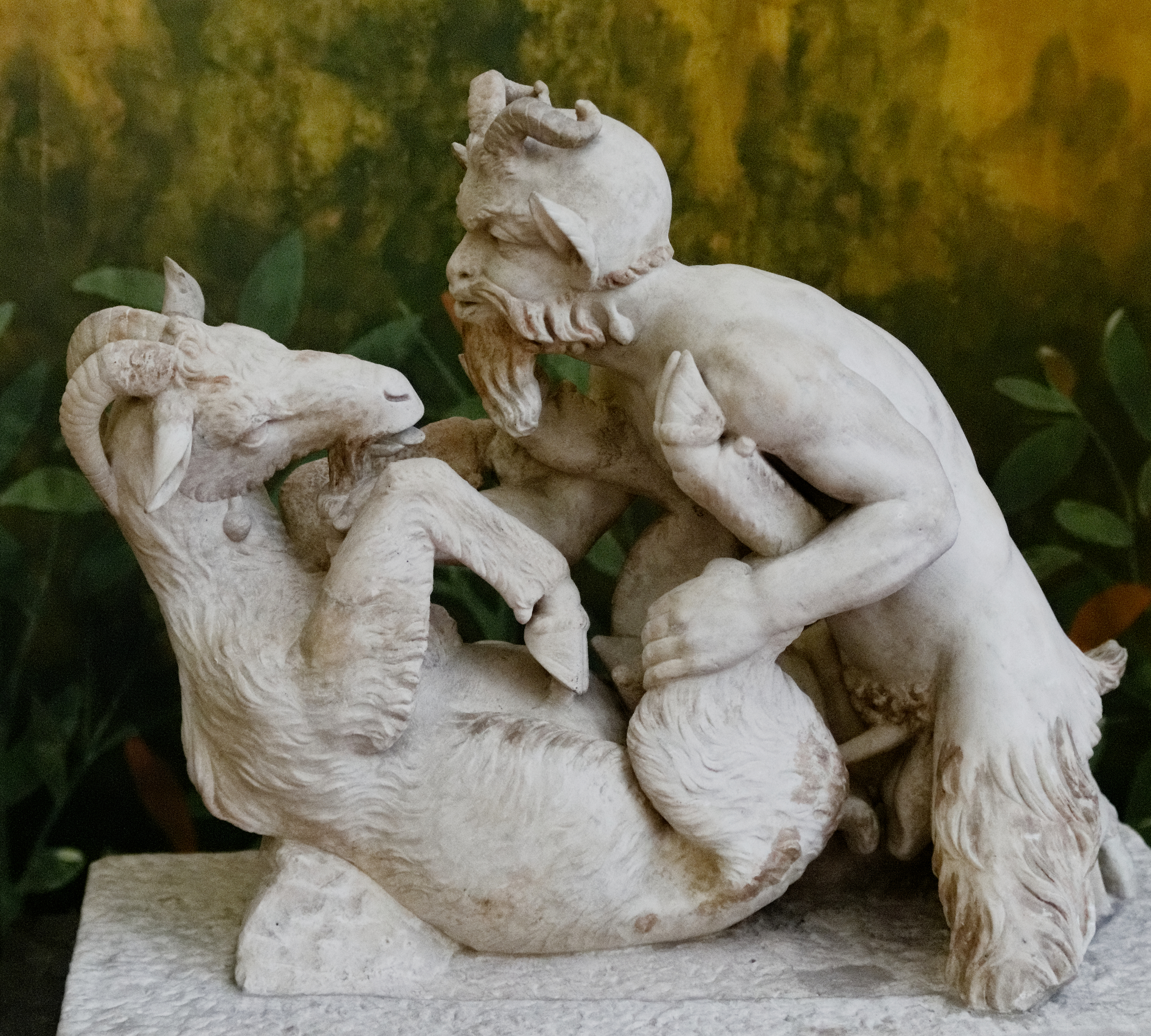
Sex between pan and a goat. Statue from the Villa of the Papyri, Herculaneum. Marble. National Archaeological Museum, Naples. First century BC – first century AD

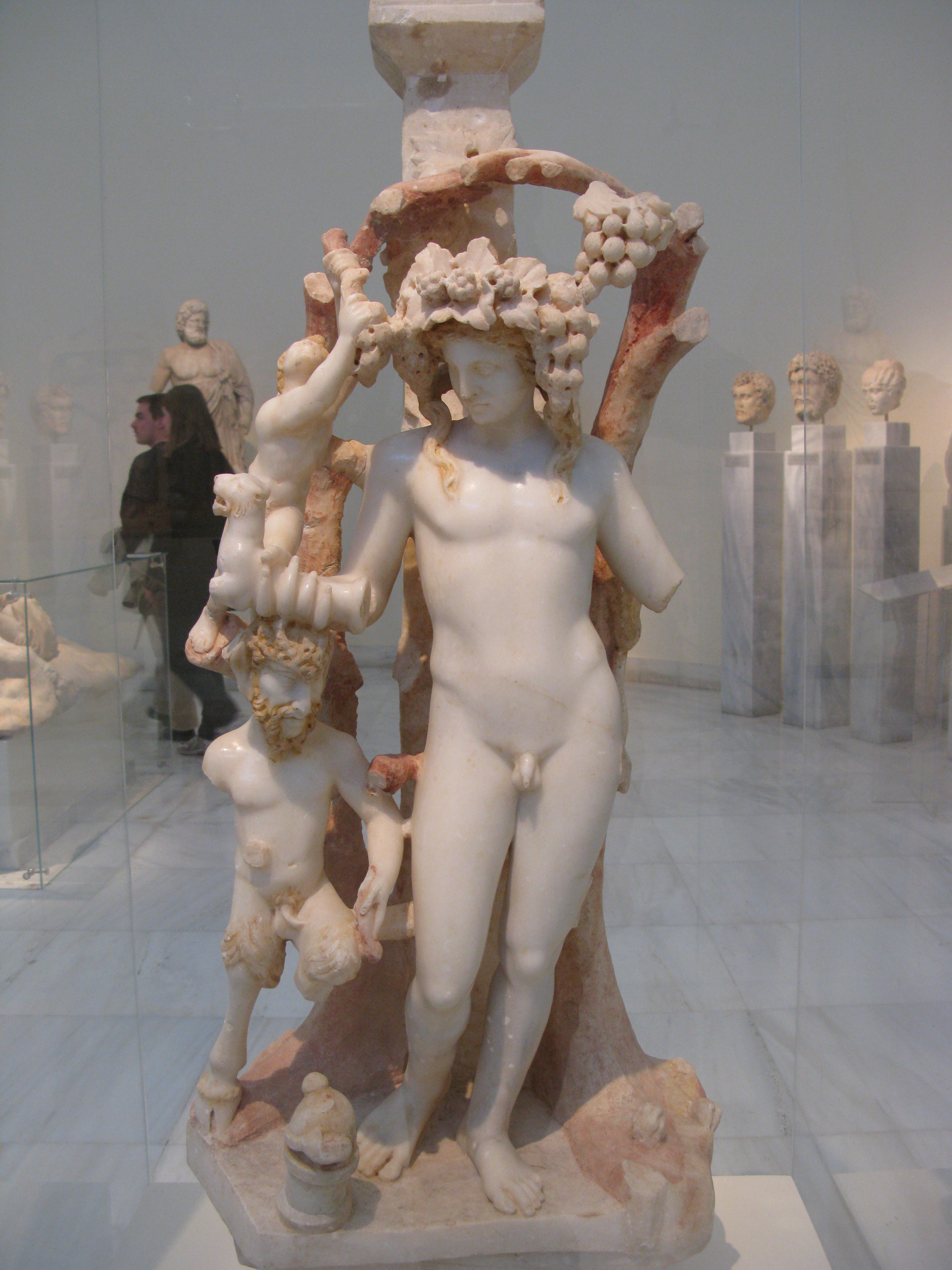
Marble table support adorned by a group including Dionysos, Pan and a Satyr; Dionysos holds a rhyton (drinking vessel) in the shape of a panther; traces of red and yellow colour are preserved on the hair of the figures and the branches; from an Asia Minor workshop, 170–180 AD, National Archaeological Museum, Athens, Greece

The goat-god Aegipan was nurtured by Amalthea with the infant Zeus in Crete. In Zeus's battle with Typhon, Aegipan and Hermes stole back Zeus's "sinews" that Typhon had hidden away in the Corycian Cave. Pan aided his foster-brother in the battle with the Titans by letting out a horrible screech and scattering them in terror. According to some traditions, Aegipan was the son of Pan, rather than his father.

The constellation Capricornus is traditionally depicted as a sea-goat, a goat with a fish's tail. (Note: See "Goatlike" Aigaion called Briareos, one of the Hecatonchires.) A myth reported as "Egyptian" in Hyginus's Poetic Astronomy says that when Aegipan – that is, Pan in his goat-god aspect – was attacked by the monster Typhon, he dived into the river Nile; the parts above water remained a goat, but those submerged changed into a fish. Admiring Pan's ruse, Zeus placed his image amongst the stars.

=== Erotic aspects ===
Pan is famous for his sexual prowess and is often depicted with a phallus. Diogenes of Sinope, speaking in jest, related a myth of Pan learning masturbation from his father, Hermes, and teaching the habit to shepherds.

There was a legend that Pan seduced the moon goddess Selene, deceiving her with a sheep's fleece.

One of the famous myths of Pan involves the origin of his pan flute, fashioned from lengths of hollow reed. Syrinx was a lovely wood-nymph of Arcadia, daughter of Ladon, the river-god. As she was returning from the hunt one day, Pan met her. To escape from his importunities, the fair nymph ran away and did not stop to hear his compliments. He pursued from Mount Lycaeum until she came to her sisters who immediately changed her into a reed. When the air blew through the reeds, it produced a plaintive melody. The god, still infatuated, took some of the reeds, because he could not identify which reed she became, and cut seven pieces (or according to some versions, nine), joined them side by side in gradually decreasing lengths, and formed the musical instrument bearing the name of his beloved Syrinx. Henceforth, Pan was seldom seen without it.

Echo was a nymph who was a great singer and dancer and scorned the love of any man. This angered Pan, a lecherous god, and he instructed his followers to kill her. Echo was torn to pieces and spread all over Earth. The goddess of the Earth, Gaia, received the pieces of Echo, whose voice remains repeating the last words of others. In some versions, Echo and Pan had two children: Iambe and Iynx. In other versions, Pan had fallen in love with Echo, but she scorned the love of any man but was enraptured by Narcissus. As Echo was cursed by Hera to only be able to repeat words that had been said by someone else, she could not speak for herself. She followed Narcissus to a pool, where he fell in love with his own reflection and changed into a narcissus flower. Echo wasted away, but her voice could still be heard in caves and other such similar places.

Pan also loved a nymph named Pitys, who was turned into a pine tree to escape him. In another version, Pan and the north wind god Boreas clashed over the lovely Pitys. Boreas uprooted all the trees to impress her, but Pan laughed and Pitys chose him. Boreas then chased her and threw her off a cliff resulting in her death. Gaia pitied Pitys and turned her into a pine tree.

According to some traditions, Pan taught Daphnis, a rustic son of Hermes, how to play the pan-pipes, and also fell in love with him.

Women who had had sexual relations with several men were referred to as "Pan girls."

=== Panic ===
Disturbed in his secluded afternoon naps, Pan's angry shout inspired panic (panikon deima) in lonely places. Following the Titans' assault on Olympus, Pan claimed credit for the victory of the gods because he had frightened the attackers. In the Battle of Marathon (490 BC), it is said that Pan favored the Athenians and so inspired panic in the hearts of their enemies, the Persians.

=== Music ===
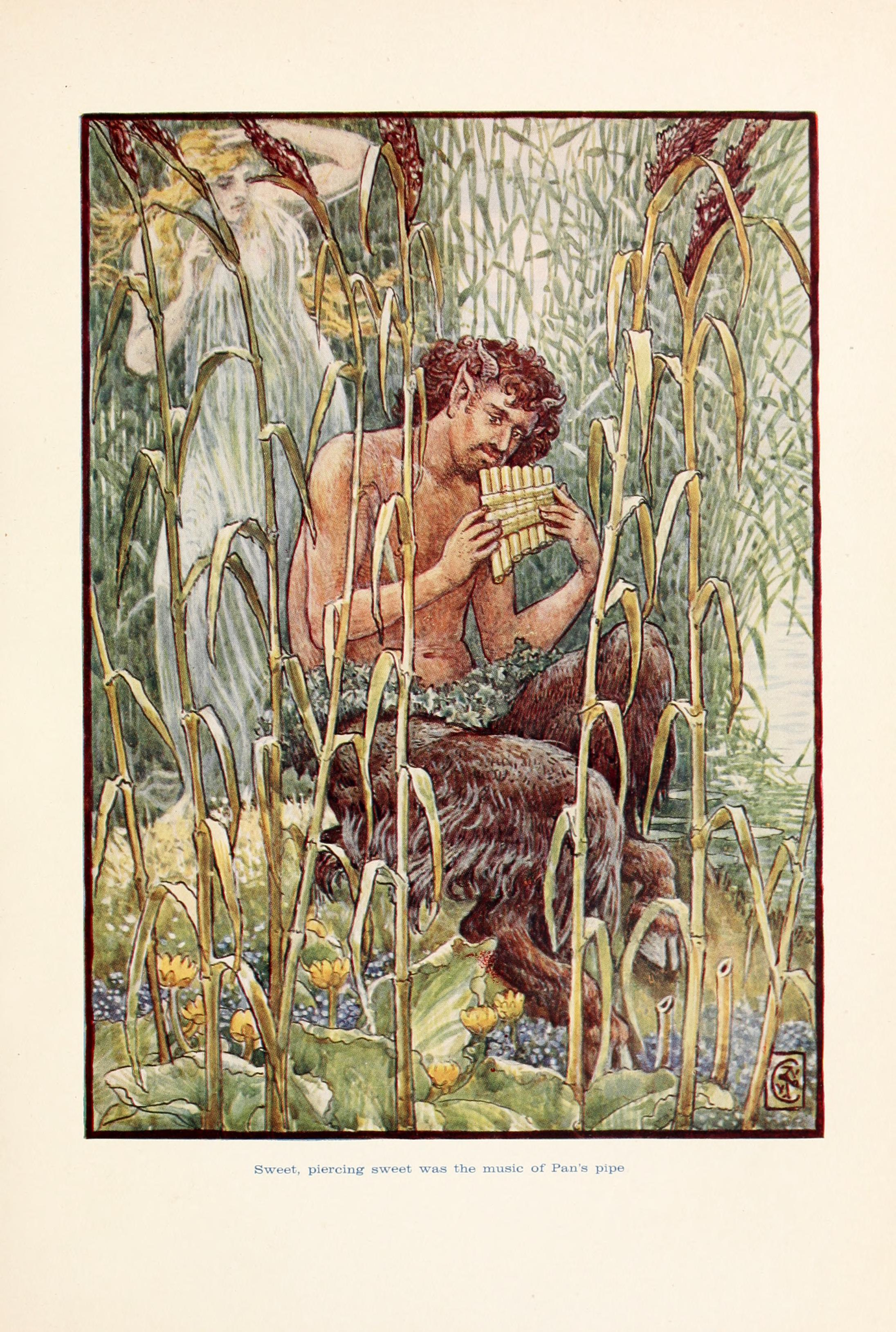
"Sweet, piercing sweet was the music of Pan's pipe" reads the caption for this depiction of Pan by Walter Crane

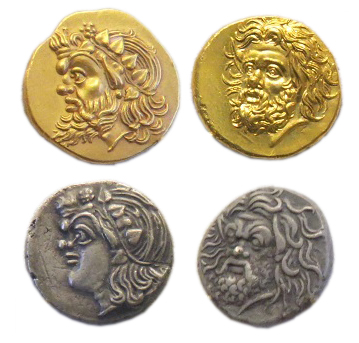
Representations of Pan on 4th century BC gold and silver Pantikapaion coins

In two late Roman sources, Hyginus and Ovid, Pan is substituted for the satyr Marsyas in the theme of a musical competition (agon), and the punishment by flaying is omitted.

Pan once had the audacity to compare his music with that of Apollo, and to challenge Apollo, the god of the lyre, to a trial of skill. Tmolus, the mountain-god, was chosen to judge. Pan blew on his pipes and gave great satisfaction with his rustic melody to himself and to his faithful follower, Midas, who happened to be present. Then Apollo struck the strings of his lyre. Tmolus at once awarded the victory to Apollo, and all but Midas agreed with the judgment. Midas dissented and questioned the justice of the award. Apollo would not suffer such a depraved pair of ears any longer and turned Midas' ears into those of a donkey.

=== Panes ===
The Panes were Pan-like spirits that protected goat-herds and sheep flocks. According to Nonnus in his epic poem Dionysiaca, the Paneides were twelve young Panes "begotten of the one ancestral Pan, their mountain-ranging father": Kelaineus, Argennos, Aigikoros, Eugeneios, Daphoineus, Omester, Phobos, Philamnos, Glaukos, Xanthos, Argos, and Phorbas. Agreus and Nomios, additional Panes mentioned by Nonnus, were the sons of Hermes and two nymphs: Agreus's mother was Sose, and Nomios's, Penelope. These Pans all helped Dionysus in his war against the Indians.

Pan Sybarios, worshipped in the Greek colony of Sybaris in Italy, was conceived when Krathis, a shepherd-boy, copulated with a she-goat.

== "The great god Pan is dead" ==
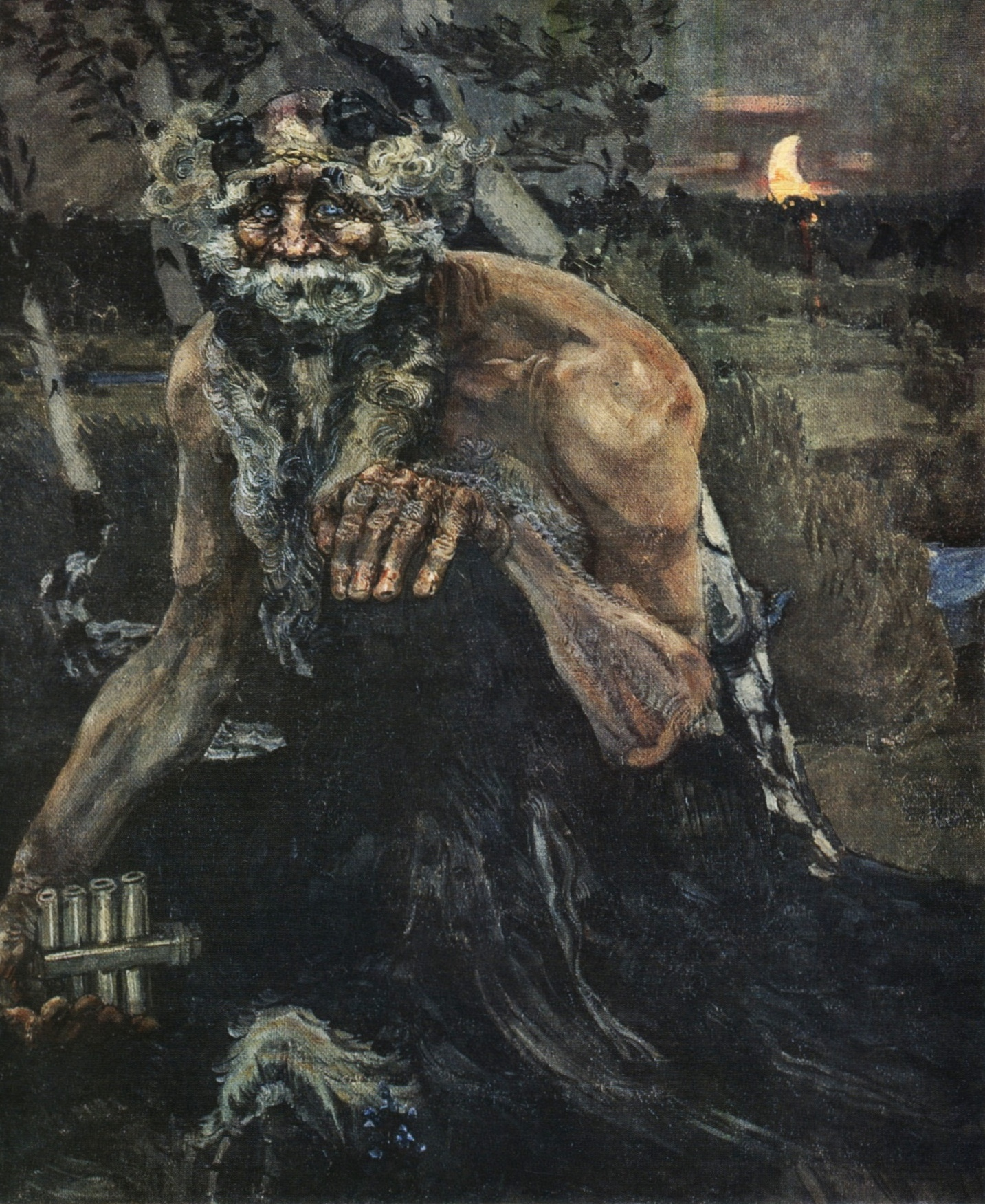
Pan, painted by Mikhail Vrubel in 1899.

In Plutarch's De defectu oraculorum ("The Obsolescence of Oracles"), Pan is the only Greek god who actually dies. During the reign of Tiberius (AD 14–37), the news of Pan's death came to one Thamus, a sailor on his way to Italy by way of the Greek island of Paxi. A divine voice hailed him across the salt water, "Thamus, are you there? When you reach Palodes, take care to proclaim that the great god Pan is dead." Which Thamus did, and the news was greeted from shore with groans and laments.

Christian apologists, including Eusebius of Caesarea, have long utilized Plutarch's story of the death of Pan. Due to the word "all" in Greek also being "pan," a pun was made that "all demons" had perished.

In Rabelais' Fourth Book of Pantagruel (sixteenth century), the Giant Pantagruel, after recollecting the tale as told by Plutarch, opines that the announcement was actually about the death of Jesus Christ, which did take place at about the same time (towards the end of Tiberius' reign), noting the aptness of the name: "for he may lawfully be said in the Greek tongue to be Pan, since he is our all. For all that we are, all that we live, all that we have, all that we hope, is him, by him, from him, and in him." In this interpretation, Rabelais was following Guillaume Postel in his De orbis terrae concordia.

The nineteenth-century visionary Anne Catherine Emmerich claimed that the phrase "the Great Pan" was a demonic epithet for Jesus Christ, and that "Thamus, or Tramus" was a watchman in the port of Nicaea, who, at the time of other events surrounding Christ's death, was commissioned to spread this message, which was later garbled "in repetition."

The twentieth-century Catholic apologist and writer G. K. Chesterton repeated the story of the death of Pan, amplifying its significance, arguing that with the "death" of Pan came the advent of Christianity. To this effect, Chesterton wrote, "It is said truly in a sense that Pan died because Christ was born. It is almost as true in another sense that men knew that Christ was born because Pan was already dead. A void was made by the vanishing world of the whole mythology of mankind, which would have asphyxiated like a vacuum if it had not been filled with theology."

In more modern times, some have suggested a possible naturalistic explanation for the myth. For example, Robert Graves (The Greek Myths) reported a suggestion that had been made by Salomon Reinach and expanded by James S. Van Teslaar that the sailors actually heard the excited shouts of the worshipers of Tammuz, Θαμούς πανμέγας τέθνηκε (Thamoús panmégas téthnēke, "All-great Tammuz is dead!"), and misinterpreted them as a message directed to an Egyptian sailor named 'Thamus': "Great Pan is Dead!" Van Teslaar explains, "[i]n its true form the phrase would have probably carried no meaning to those on board who must have been unfamiliar with the worship of Tammuz which was a transplanted, and for those parts, therefore, an exotic custom." Certainly, when Pausanias toured Greece about a century after Plutarch, he found Pan's shrines, sacred caves and sacred mountains still very much frequented. However, a naturalistic explanation might not be needed. For example, William Hansen has shown that the story is quite similar to a class of widely known tales known as Fairies Send a Message.

The cry "The Great Pan is dead" has appealed to poets, such as John Milton, in his ecstatic celebration of Christian peace, On the Morning of Christ's Nativity line 89, Elizabeth Barrett Browning, and Louisa May Alcott.

== Influence ==
=== Iconography ===
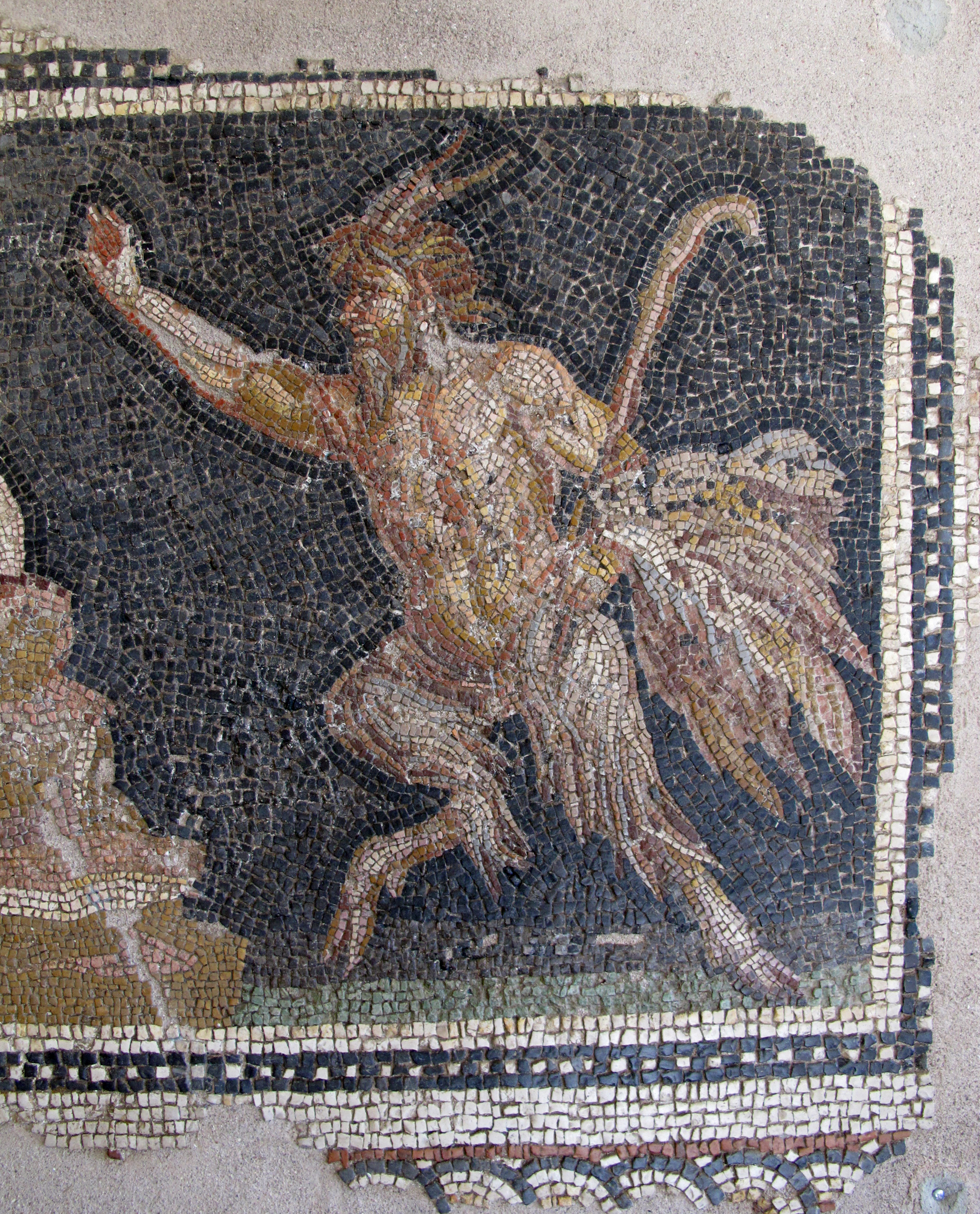
Ancient Roman mosaic showing a horned, goat-legged Pan holding a shepherd's crook. Much of Satan's traditional iconography is apparently derived from Pan.

Representations of Pan have influenced conventional popular depictions of the Devil.

=== Literary revival ===
Pan depicted on the cover of The Wind in the Willows

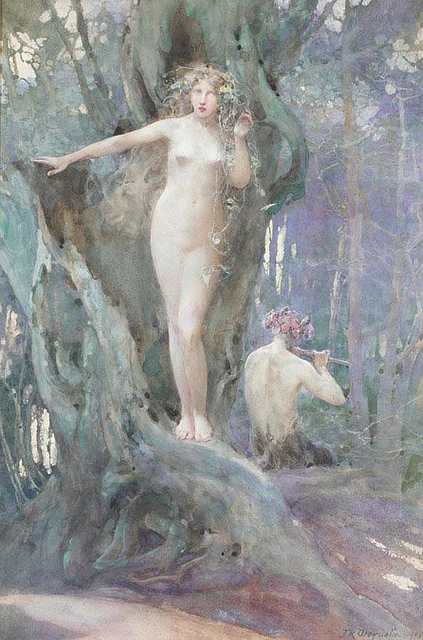
The Magic of Pan's Flute, by John Reinhard Weguelin (1905)

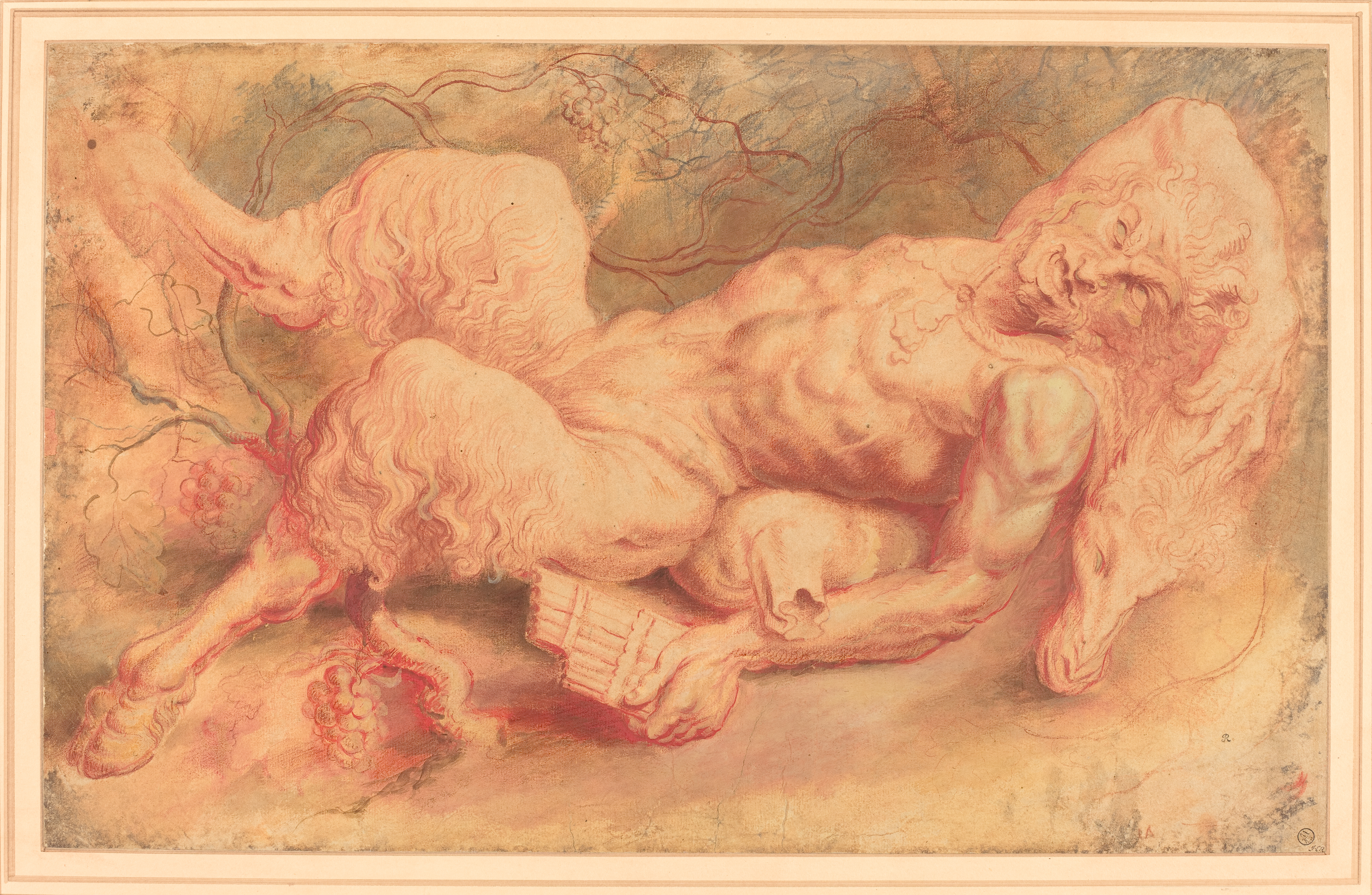
Pan Reclining, by Peter Paul Rubens. possibly c. 1610. Held at National Gallery of Art

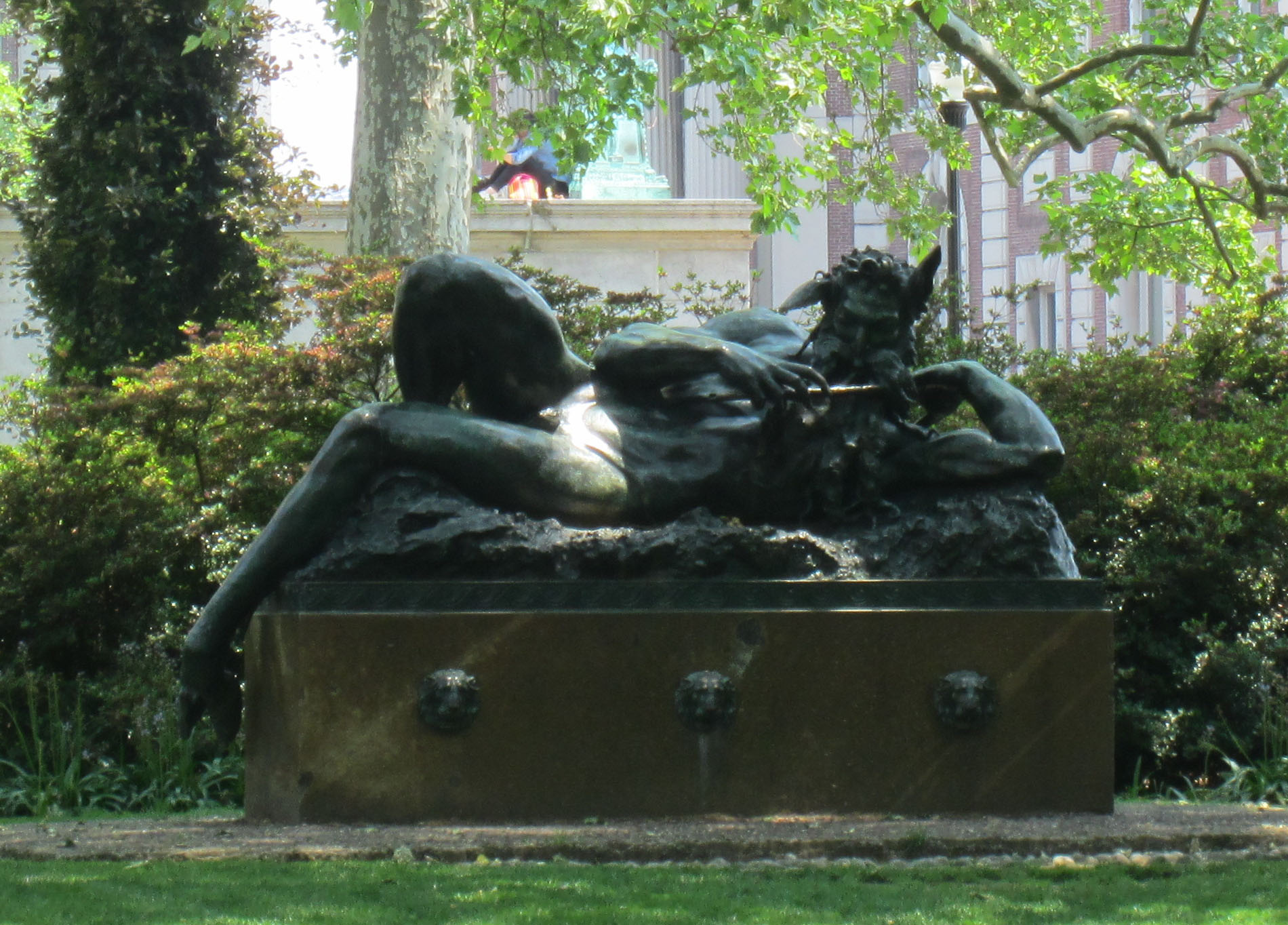
The Great God Pan, by George Grey Barnard. 1899. Columbia University, New York

In the late-eighteenth century, interest in Pan revived among liberal scholars. Richard Payne Knight discussed Pan in his Discourse on the Worship of Priapus (1786) as a symbol of creation expressed through sexuality. "Pan is represented pouring water upon the organ of generation; that is, invigorating the active creative power by the prolific element."

John Keats's "Endymion" (1818) opens with a festival dedicated to Pan where a stanzaic hymn is sung in praise of him. Keats drew most of his account of Pan's activities from the Elizabethan poets. Douglas Bush notes, "The goat-god, the tutelary divinity of shepherds, had long been allegorized on various levels, from Christ to 'Universall Nature' (Sandys); here he becomes the symbol of the romantic imagination, of supra-mortal knowledge.'"

In the late-nineteenth century Pan became an increasingly common figure in literature and art. Patricia Merivale states that between 1890 and 1926 there was an "astonishing resurgence of interest in the Pan motif". He appears in poetry, in novels and children's books, and is referenced in the name of the character Peter Pan. In the Peter Pan stories, Peter represents a golden age of pre-civilisation in both the minds of very young children (before enculturation and education), and in the natural world outside the influence of humans. Peter Pan's character is both charming and selfish - emphasizing our cultural confusion about whether human instincts are natural and good, or uncivilised and bad. J. M. Barrie describes Peter as 'a betwixt and between', part animal and part human, and uses this device to explore many issues of human and animal psychology within the Peter Pan stories.

Arthur Machen's 1894 novella The Great God Pan uses the god's name in a simile about the whole world being revealed as it really is: "seeing the Great God Pan". The novella is considered by many (including Stephen King) as being one of the greatest horror-stories ever written.

In an article in Hellebore magazine, Melissa Edmundson argues that women writers from the nineteenth century used the figure of Pan "to reclaim agency in texts that explored female empowerment and sexual liberation". In Eleanor Farjeon's poem "Pan-Worship", the speaker tries to summon Pan to life after feeling "a craving in me", wishing for a "spring-tide" that will replace the stagnant "autumn" of the soul. A dark version of Pan's seductiveness appears in Margery Lawrence's Robin's Rath, both giving and taking life and vitality.

Pan is the eponymous "Piper at the Gates of Dawn" in the seventh chapter of Kenneth Grahame's The Wind in the Willows (1908). Grahame's Pan, unnamed but clearly recognisable, is a powerful but secretive nature-god, protector of animals, who casts a spell of forgetfulness on all those he helps. He makes a brief appearance to help Rat and Mole recover the Otter's lost son Portly.

The goat-footed god entices villagers to listen to his pipes as if in a trance in Lord Dunsany's novel The Blessing of Pan (1927). Although the god does not appear within the story, his energy invokes the younger folk of the village to revel in the summer twilight, while the vicar of the village is the only person worried about the revival of worship of the old pagan god.

Pan features as a prominent character in Tom Robbins' Jitterbug Perfume (1984).

The British writer and editor Mark Beech of Egaeus Press published in 2015 the limited-edition anthology Soliloquy for Pan which includes essays and poems such as "The Rebirthing of Pan" by Adrian Eckersley, "Pan's Pipes" by Robert Louis Stevenson, "Pan with Us" by Robert Frost, and "The Death of Pan" by Lord Dunsany. Some of the detailed illustrated depictions of Pan included in the volume are by the artists Giorgio Ghisi, Sir James Thornhill, Bernard Picart, Agostino Veneziano, Vincenzo Cartari, and Giovanni Battista Tiepolo.

In the Percy Jackson novels, author Rick Riordan uses "The Great God Pan is dead" quote as a plot point in the novel The Sea of Monsters, and in The Battle of the Labyrinth Pan is revealed to be in a state of half-death.

=== Revival in music ===
Pan inspired pieces of classical music by Claude Debussy. Syrinx, written as part of incidental music to the play Psyché by Gabriel Mourey, was originally called "Flûte de Pan". Prélude à l'après-midi d'un faune was based on a poem by Stéphane Mallarmé.

The story of Pan is the inspiration for the first movement in Benjamin Britten's work for solo oboe, Six Metamorphoses after Ovid first performed in 1951. Inspired by characters from Ovid's fifteen-volume work Metamorphoses, Britten titled the movement, "Pan: who played upon the reed pipe which was Syrinx, his beloved."

The British rock band Pink Floyd named its first album The Piper at the Gates of Dawn in reference to Pan as he appears in The Wind in the Willows. Andrew King, Pink Floyd's manager, said Syd Barrett "thought Pan had given him an understanding into the way nature works. It formed into his holistic view of the world."

Brian Jones, a founding member of The Rolling Stones, strongly identified with Pan. He produced the live album Brian Jones Presents the Pipes of Pan at Joujouka, about a Moroccan festival that evoked the ancient Roman rites of Pan.

Musician Mike Scott of the Waterboys refers to Pan as an archetypal force within us all, and talks about his search for “The Pan Within", a theme also reflected in the song’s sequel, “The Return of Pan".

=== Revived worship ===
In the English town of Painswick in Gloucestershire, a group of eighteenth-century gentry, led by Benjamin Hyett, organised an annual procession dedicated to Pan, during which a statue of the deity was held aloft, and people shouted "Highgates! Highgates!" Hyett also erected temples and follies to Pan in the gardens of his house and a "Pan's lodge", located over Painswick Valley. The tradition died out in the 1830s, but was revived in 1885 by a new vicar, W. H. Seddon, who mistakenly believed that the festival had been ancient in origin. One of Seddon's successors, however, was less appreciative of the pagan festival and put an end to it in 1950, when he had Pan's statue buried.

Occultists Aleister Crowley and Victor Neuburg built an altar to Pan on Da'leh Addin, a mountain in Algeria, where they performed a magic ceremony to summon the god. In the final rite of the 1910 ritual play The Rites of Eleusis, written by Crowley, Pan "pulls back the final veil, revealing the child Horus, who represents humanity's eternal and divine element."

=== Neopaganism ===
In 1933, the Egyptologist Margaret Murray published the book The God of the Witches, in which she theorised that Pan was merely one form of a horned god who was worshipped across Europe by a witch-cult. This theory influenced the Neopagan notion of the Horned God as an archetype of male virility and sexuality. In Wicca, the archetype of the Horned God is highly important, as represented by such deities as the Celtic Cernunnos, the Hindu Pashupati, and the Greek Pan.

== See also ==
- 4450 Pan – Asteroid
- Aristaeus – God of rural crafts in Greek mythology
- Cernunnos – Celtic horned god
- Green Man – Figure in English foklore
- Kokopelli – Fertility deity venerated by some Native American cultures
- Nymph – Greek and Roman mythological creature
- Pan – Moon of Saturn
- Pan – sculpture by Roger White
- Pan in popular culture
- Puck – Fairy from English folklore
- Woodwose – Mythical figure

== Sources ==
- Apollodorus, Apollodorus, The Library, with an English Translation by Sir James George Frazer, F.B.A., F.R.S. in 2 Volumes, Cambridge, Massachusetts, Harvard University Press; London, William Heinemann Ltd., 1921. ISBN 0-674-99135-4. Online version at the Perseus Digital Library.
- Borgeaud, Philippe (1979). Recherches sur le Dieu Pan. Geneva University.
- Bowra, Cecil Maurice, Pindari carmina: cum fragmentis, Oxford, E. Typographeo Clarendoniano, 1947. Internet Archive.
- Burkert, Walter (1985). Greek Religion. Harvard University Press.
- Cicero, Marcus Tullius, De Natura Deorum in Cicero: On the Nature of the Gods. Academics, translated by H. Rackham, Loeb Classical Library No. 268, Cambridge, Massachusetts, Harvard University Press, first published 1933, revised 1951. ISBN 978-0-674-99296-2. Online version at Harvard University Press. Internet Archive.
- Cohen, Beth (22 November 2021). Not the Classical Ideal: Athens and the Construction of the Other in Greek Art. Leiden, the Netherlands: Brill Publications. ISBN 978-90-04-11618-4.
- Diotima (2007), The Goat Foot God, Bibliotheca Alexandrina.
- Hard, Robin, The Routledge Handbook of Greek Mythology: Based on H.J. Rose's "Handbook of Greek Mythology", Psychology Press, 2004, ISBN 9780415186360. Google Books.
- Herodotus, Histories, translated by A. D. Godley, Cambridge, Massachusetts, Harvard University Press, 1920. ISBN 0674991338. Online version at the Perseus Digital Library.
- Homeric Hymn 19 to Pan, in The Homeric Hymns and Homerica with an English Translation by Hugh G. Evelyn-White, Cambridge, Massachusetts, Harvard University Press; London, William Heinemann Ltd., 1914. Online version at the Perseus Digital Library.
- Hyginus, Gaius Julius, Fabulae, in The Myths of Hyginus, edited and translated by Mary A. Grant, Lawrence: University of Kansas Press, 1960. Online version at ToposText.
- Gantz, Timothy, Early Greek Myth: A Guide to Literary and Artistic Sources, Johns Hopkins University Press, 1996, Two volumes: ISBN 978-0-8018-5360-9 (Vol. 1), ISBN 978-0-8018-5362-3 (Vol. 2).
- Grimal, Pierre, The Dictionary of Classical Mythology, Wiley-Blackwell, 1996. ISBN 978-0-631-20102-1.
- Kerényi, Károly (1951). The Gods of the Greeks. Thames & Hudson.
- Laurie, Allison, "Afterword" in Peter Pan, J. M. Barrie, Signet Classic, 1987. ISBN 978-0-451-52088-3.
- Malini, Roberto (1998), Pan dio della selva, Edizioni dell'Ambrosino, Milano.
- March, Jenny, Cassell's Dictionary of Classical Mythology, Cassell & Co., 2001. ISBN 0-304-35788-X. Internet Archive.
- Ruck, Carl A. P.; Danny Staples (1994). The World of Classical Myth. Carolina Academic Press. ISBN 0-89089-575-9.
- Servius, Commentary on the Georgics of Vergil, Georgius Thilo, Ed. 1881. Online version at the Perseus Digital Library (Latin).
- Virgil, Georgics in Bucolics, Aeneid, and Georgics of Vergil. J. B. Greenough. Boston. Ginn & Co. 1900. Online version at the Perseus Digital Library.
- Vinci, Leo (1993), Pan: Great God of Nature, Neptune Press, London.
