= Callithyia (daughter of Peiras) =

Mythological figure

In Greek mythology and legendary history, Callithyia (/ˌkælɪˈθaɪ.ə/; Ancient Greek: Καλλίθυια; also Callithoe (/kəˈlɪθoʊi/; Καλλιθόη), Callithea (/kəˈlɪθiə/; Καλλιθέα), or Io (/ˈaɪ.oʊ/; Ἰώ Ancient Greek: [iːɔ̌ː]) was an Argive princess, the daughter of King Peiras, or of Peiranthus, the son of Argus. She was regarded as the first priestess of Argive Hera. Aelius Aristides calls her "the best among women as well as among men".

== Mythology ==
Peiras was credited with founding the first temple of Hera in Argolis, as well as with carving a wooden image of the goddess for the sanctuary; it was at this temple that Callithyia performed her duties as priestess. Scholia on Aratus describe her as the inventor of the chariot and the mother of Trochilus.

Callithyia is perhaps identical with "Io Callithyessa", "the first priestess of Athena" according to Hesychius of Alexandria. In a lesser known version of the Argive genealogy, Io was the daughter of Peiren, likely the same as Peiras.
