= Argus (king of Argos) =

Mythological Greek character, king and eponym of Argos

In Greek mythology, Argus (/ˈɑːrɡəs/; Ancient Greek: Ἄργος, romanized: Árgos, lit. 'bright', 'shining' or 'watchful') was the king and eponym of Argos.

== Family ==
He was a son of Zeus and Niobe, daughter of Phoroneus, and was possibly the brother of Pelasgus. Argus married either Evadne, the daughter of Strymon and Neaera, or Peitho the Oceanid, and had by her six sons: Criasus, Ecbasus, Iasus, Peiranthus (or Peiras, Peirasus, Peiren), Epidaurus and Tiryns (said by Pausanias to be the namesake of the city Tiryns). According to Pausanias, yet another son of Argus was the Argive Phorbas (elsewhere his grandson through Criasus). Meanwhile, Cercops speaks of Argus Panoptes as the son of Argus and Ismene.

Comparative table of Argus' family
Relation	Name	Sources									
Relation	Name	Σ ad Homer	Hesiod	Cercops	Σ ad Euripides	Herodotus	Apollodorus		Hyginus	Pausanias	Stephanus
Parents	Apis	✓									
Parents	Zeus		✓								
Parents	Zeus and Niobe						✓		✓	✓	
Sibling	Pelasgus						✓				
Wife	Ismene			✓				✓			
Wife	Peitho				✓						
Wife	Evadne						✓		✓		
Children	Epidaurus		✓				✓			✓	
Children	Argus Panoptes			✓				✓			
Children	Iasus					✓		✓			
Children	Ecbasus						✓		✓		✓
Children	Piras						✓				
Children	Criasus						✓		✓		
Children	Peranthus								✓		
Children	Peirasus									✓	
Children	Phorbas									✓	
Children	Tiryns									✓	

== Reign ==
Argus succeeded to his maternal grandfather's power over Peloponnese, naming the kingdom after himself. A scholiast on Homer calls Argus the son and successor of Apis. Jerome and Eusebius, citing the now-lost history of Castor of Rhodes, also agree in making Argus the successor of Apis, and son of Zeus and Niobe, and give the length of his reign over "Argeia" (Argos) as 70 years.

The tomb of Argus in Argos was shown as late as the times of Pausanias, who also made mention of a grove sacred to Argus in Lacedaemon where some from the Argive army took refuge after being defeated by Cleomenes I, and were subsequently burned to death therein.

Regnal titles
Preceded by Apis	King of Argos	Succeeded by Criasus
