= Iamidai =

In Ancient Greece, the dynasty of Iamidai (Latinised as Iamidae) at Olympia were an extended family of seers, the "house of Iamus", one of the two clans from which the administrators of the Olympic Games were drawn, well into the 3rd century CE. At Olympia, they would interpret the entrails of burnt offerings. Like their equals at Olympia, the Klytidai, who claimed descent from Melampous, by way of Klytios, grandson of Amphiaraos, the Iamidai claimed descent from Iamus, a son of Apollo (the central figure of the west pediment) and was the mythical ancestor of the Iamidai. Tisamenos was induced to leave Elis and advise Sparta, in return for which he and his heirs were accorded citizenship, the only outsiders ever to have been honoured in this way; Pausanias noted at Sparta in the 2nd century BCE ""a tomb to the soothsayers from Elis, the so-called Iamidai".
