= Ereuthalion =

Ancient Greek male name

In Greek mythology, the name Ereuthalion (Ancient Greek: Ἐρευθαλίων, romanized: Ereuthalión, lit. 'reddish' or 'ruddy') may refer to:

- Ereuthalion, son of Criasus, founder and eponym of the city Ereuthalia.
- Ereuthalion, an Arcadian who fought in the battle against the Pylians "beneath the walls of Pheia about the streams of Iardanus". For the battle, he wore the armor of Areithous, which had been handed over to him by Lycurgus of Arcadia. He was killed by Nestor, who would later recall this as a notable episode of his youth and early battle experience, speaking of Ereuthalion as the strongest opponent he ever slew.
- Ereuthalion, a Cilician, husband of Phyllis and father of Oeneus; his son fought under Dionysus in the latter's conflict with Poseidon. His wife and son are not to be confused with the better known characters of the names Phyllis and Oeneus.
