= Evadne =

Any of several women in Greek mythology

In Greek mythology, Evadne (/iːˈvædniː/; Ancient Greek: Εὐάδνη, romanized: Euádnē, lit. 'well-adorned', 'holy one', or 'pleasing one') was a name attributed to the following individuals:

- Evadne, a daughter of Strymon and Neaera, wife of Argus (king of Argos), mother of Ecbasus, Piras, Epidaurus and Criasus.
- Evadne, a daughter of Poseidon and Pitane who was raised by Aepytus of Arcadia. She experienced the joys of her first love with Apollo. However, when her consequent pregnancy was discovered by Aepytus, he was furious and left to consult the Oracle of Apollo. During childbirth, Apollo sent Eileithyia and the Moirae to assist his lover and ease her pain. Evadne gave birth in the wilderness and left the child, Iamus, exposed to the elements. Five days later, Aepytus returned from the Delphi, where he had been told by Apollo's Oracle that Evadne's child was indeed the son of Apollo and destined to be a gifted prophet. He demanded that the child be brought to him, and so Evadne retrieved Iamus from the patch of violets where she had left him. Iamus had been nurtured for those five days by the honeybees that were sent by Apollo, or by the Fates. Evadne named the child Iamus (“Boy of the Violets”). He went on to found the Iamidae, a family of priests from Olympia.
- Evadne, a daughter of Pelias, King of Iolcus. She was given by Jason in marriage to Canes, son of Cephalus and a king of Phocis.
- Evadne, daughter of Iphis of Argos or Phylax (or Phylacus) and wife of Capaneus, with whom she gave birth to Sthenelus. Her husband was killed by a lightning bolt in the war of the Seven against Thebes, and she threw herself on his funeral pyre and died. In some accounts, she was called the daughter of Ares. In Book VI of the Roman poet Virgil's Aeneid, Evadne is one of the inhabitants of the "Mourning Fields" (Lugentes Campi), a region of the underworld visited by Aeneas.
