= Piras (mythology) =

In Greek mythology, Piras or Pieras (Ancient Greek: Πειράς or Πείραντα) was a king of Argos. He was also known as Piren (Πειρῆνα Peiren), Peirasus (Πείρασος Peirasos) and Piranthus (Πείρανθος Peranthus or Peiranthos, lit. 'flower-like' or 'bloom of the rock/ piercing flower')

== Family ==
Piras was the son of Argus and Evadne, daughter of river god Strymon while his brothers were, Ecbasus, Tiryns, Epidaurus, Criasus and according to some, Phorbas also. Piras's wife was Callirrhoe who mothered his sons, Argus, Arestorides and Triopas. According to Hesiod and Acusilaus, Peiren was Io's father while Eusebius mentioned Callithyia as the daughter of Peiranthus. Io may be therefore identical to Callithyia as suggested by Hesychius of Alexandria.

Comparative table of Piras' names and family
Relation	Name	Sources				
Relation	Name	Apollodorus		Hyginus	Pausanias	Eusebius
Name	Piras	✓				
Name	Piren or Peiren		✓			
Name	Peranthus or Piranthus			✓		
Name	Peiras or Peirasus				✓	
Name	Peiras					✓
Parents	Argus and Evadne	✓		✓		
Parents	Argus				✓	
Siblings	Ecbasus	✓		✓		
Siblings	Epidaurus	✓			✓	
Siblings	Criasus	✓		✓		
Siblings	Phorbas				✓	
Siblings	Tiryns				✓	
Wife	Callirhoe			✓		
Children	Io		✓			
Children	Argus			✓		
Children	Arestorides			✓		
Children	Triopas			✓		
Children	Callithyia					✓

== Reign ==
Peiras was credited with the founding of the first temple of Hera in Argolis and appointed his own daughter Callithyia as the priestess. Of the statues of Hera, which Pausanias saw in the Heraeum near Mycenae, the most ancient was one made of the wild pear-tree from the wood about Tiryns, which Peirasus was said to have dedicated for the sanctuary. The Argives, when they took that city, transferred the carved image of the goddess to the Heraeum. The account of Pausanias and the mythographers, however, does not represent Peirasus as the artist of this image, as some modern writers suppose, but as the king who dedicated it.

Peiras succeeded his father Argus while his son Triopas in turn followed him on the throne.

PIRAS' CHRONOLOGY OF REIGN ACCORDING TO VARIOUS SOURCES
Kings of Argos	Regnal Years	Hyginus	Pausanias
Precessor	1600	Argus	-do-
Piras	1575	Peranthus	Peirasus
Successor	1550	Triopas	-do-
