= Epidaurus (mythology) =

Greek mythologcal character

In Greek mythology, Epidaurus (Ancient Greek: Ἐπίδαυρος) was the presumed eponym of the polis Epidaurus.

His parentage varies from one local version of the myth to another: the Argive version gives him as the son of Argus (himself son of Zeus) and Evadne; people of Elis believed him to be a son of Pelops; finally, the Epidaurians themselves considered him to be a son of Apollo. These versions are recounted by Pausanias, who also adds that he knew of no natives of Epidaurus who would claim descent from the eponymous hero.
