= Corycia =

Naiad in Greek mythology

In Greek mythology, Corycia (Ancient Greek: Κωρυκία, romanized: Kōrykia) or Corycis (Kōrukis), was a naiad who lived on Mount Parnassus in Phocis.

== Family ==
Corycia's father was the local river-god Kephisos or Pleistos of northern Boeotia. With Apollo, she became the mother of Lycorus (Lyrcorus) who gave his name to the city Lycoreia.

== Mythology ==
Corycia was one of the Thriae nymphs of the springs of the Corycian Cave, which was named after her. She was related to the nymph Castalia who presided over the sacred springs at Delphi. Corycia was closely identified with Kleodora and Melaina.

The plural Coryciae was applied to the daughters of Pleistos.
