= Parnassus (disambiguation) =

Mount Parnassus is a mountain in Greece, sacred in mythology and a metaphor for the arts and learning.

Parnassus or Parnassos may also refer to:

== Geography ==
=== Greece and Rome ===
- Parnassos (municipality), a former municipality in Phocis, Greece, named for Mount Parnassus
- Parnassus (Cappadocia), an ancient Roman town in Asia Minor, a former Catholic diocese and present titular see

=== New Zealand ===
- Parnassus, New Zealand, a town on the South Island

=== United States ===
- Mount Parnassus (Colorado), a summit in the Rocky Mountains
- Mount Sutro, formerly Mount Parnassus, a hill in San Francisco, California
- Parnassus, Pennsylvania, a neighborhood of New Kensington, Pennsylvania

== Literature ==
- Parnassus plays, a comedic cycle originally performed at Cambridge University 1598–1602
- Parnassos, a Greek literary magazine published by the Parnassos Literary Society in Athens, 1877–1895
- Parnassus, an American art journal published from 1929–1941, until it changed its name to College Art Journal
- Parnassus (1973 magazine), an American literary magazine published in New York, 1973–2019
- Parnassus (Northern Essex Community College), the literary arts magazine of Northern Essex Community College, Massachusetts, founded in 1965

== Painting and sculpture ==
- Parnassus (Mantegna), a 1497 painting by Andrea Mantegna
- Parnassus (Poussin), a 1631–1633 painting by Nicolas Poussin
- The Parnassus, a 1511 painting by Raphael
- Frieze of Parnassus, an 1860s frieze on the Albert Memorial, London, England

== Other uses ==
- Parnassos, in myth, the son of the nymph Cleodora, and namesake of the mountain
- Parnassus (ship) – one of several vessels by that name
- Parnassos Strovolou, a Cypriot sports club in Strovolos

== See also ==
- Montparnasse, a neighbourhood in Paris
- Parnassia, a plant genus
- Parnassius, a butterfly genus
- Parnassianism, a 19th-century French literary movement
- The Imaginarium of Doctor Parnassus, a 2009 fantasy film
