= Parnas =

Parnas may refer to:

- Parnas (surname)
- Parnas fountain, a fountain in Brno, Czech Republic
- Parnas (Saint Petersburg Metro), a metro station in St. Petersburg, Russia
- People's Freedom Party (Russia) (PARNAS), an opposition political party in Russia
- Parnas Tower, a skyscraper in South Korea
- a synonym for gabbai or other synagogue functionary

== See also ==
- Parnassos (municipality), a municipality in Greece
- Parnassus (disambiguation)
- Parna (disambiguation)
- Parnes (disambiguation)
