= Delphus =

Son of Poseidon in Greek mythology

In Greek mythology, Delphus (/ˈdɛlfəs/; Ancient Greek: Δέλφος, Delphos) was the person from whom the town of Delphi was believed to have derived its name.

== Biography ==
Delphus was said to be the son of Poseidon and Melantho (Melantheia), daughter of Deucalion. In other accounts, he was the son of Apollo by Celaeno, the daughter of Hyamus and granddaughter of Lycorus, and, according to others, by Thyia, the daughter of the autochthon Castalius, or by Melaina, the daughter of Cephissus. He is further said to have had a son, Pythis, who ruled over the country about Mount Parnassus, and from whom the oracle received the name of Pytho.

In yet another version, his mother is Melanis, a daughter of Hyamus and Melantheia, and father is not mentioned; Delphus is said to have inherited his grandfather's kingdom in the neighborhood of Mount Parnassus, to have married Castalia, and to have had two children, a son Castalius and a daughter Phemonoe, the first person to write hexameters. His grandson through Castalius was Laphrius, and his great-grandson through Laphrius was Noutius.
