= Celaeno =

Disambiguation page

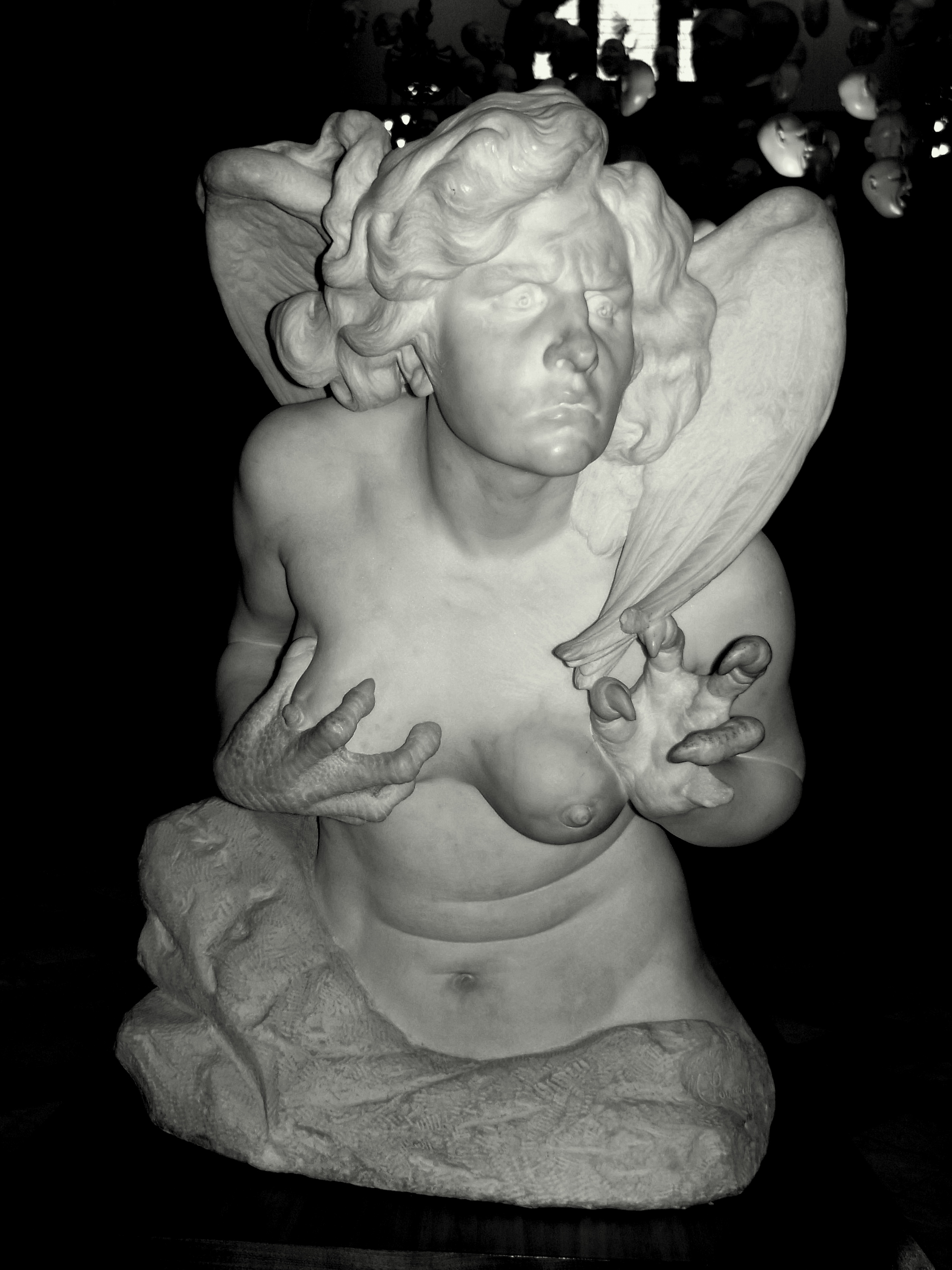
The Harpy Celaeno (1902) by Mary Pownall, at the Kelvingrove Art Gallery and Museum in Glasgow

In Greek mythology, Celaeno (/sɪˈliːnoʊ/; Ancient Greek: Κελαινώ, romanized: Kelainṓ, lit. 'the dark one', also Celeno or Kelaino, sometimes Calaeno) was the name of several figures.

- Celaeno, one of the Pleiades. She was said to be mother of Lycus and Nycteus, of King Eurypylus (or Eurytus) of Cyrene, and of Lycaon, also by Poseidon
- Celaeno, one of the Harpies, whom Aeneas encountered at Strophades. She gave him prophecies of his coming journeys.
- Celaeno, one of the Danaïdes, the daughters of Danaus. Her mother was Crino. She married and killed Hyperbius, son of Aegyptus and Hephaestine. She was also believed to have had a son Celaenus by Poseidon.
- Celaeno, a Phocian princess as the daughter of King Hyamus of Hyampolis, son of Lycorus. Her mother was Melantheia (Melantho), daughter of Deucalion. Celaeno or her sister Melanis became the mother of Delphus by Apollo.
- Celaeno, daughter of Ergea by Poseidon. She was the mother of Lycus and Chimaereus by Prometheus.
- Celaeno, an Amazon. She was killed by Heracles whilst he was undertaking the ninth labour.

== Astronomical objects ==
- Celaeno, a star in the constellation of Taurus.
