= Thriae =

Bee women / nymphs from Greek mythology

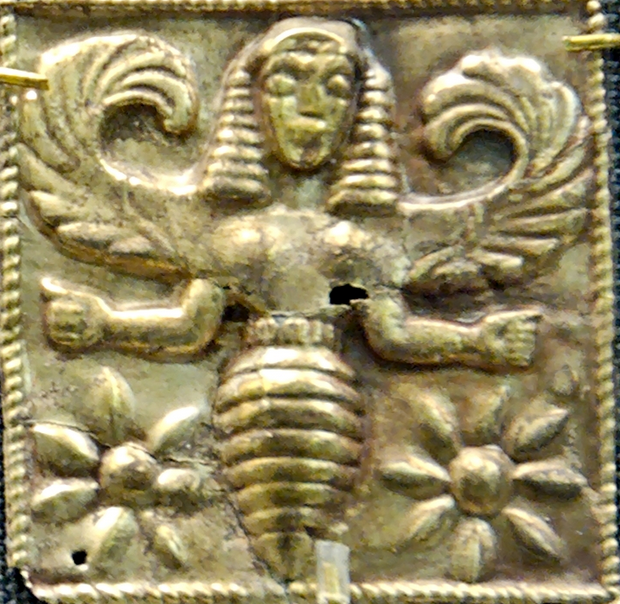
Βee goddesses, perhaps one of the Thriae, found at Camiros, Rhodes, dated to 7th century BCE (British Museum)

The Thriae (/ˈθraɪ.iː/; Ancient Greek: Θριαί, romanized: Thriaí) were three nymphs associated with Mount Parnassus above Delphi, one of a number of such triads in Greek mythology.

== Mythology ==
According to Philochorus, the Thriae were the nurses of Apollo on Mount Parnassus. Modern accounts make them Naiads (nymphs) of the sacred springs of the Corycian Cave of Mount Parnassus in Phocis, and the patrons of bees. The nymphs had women's heads and torsos and lower body and wings of a bee.

In a fragment of the 5th-century BC mythographer Pherecydes, the Thriae are said to be daughters of the god Zeus. According to Pausanias, their names were Melaina ('The Black'), Cleodora ('Famed for her Gift'), and Daphnis ('Laurel') or Corycia. The nymph sisters were romantically linked to the gods Apollo and Poseidon; Corycia, the sister after whom the Corycian Cave was named, was the mother of Lycoreus with Apollo, Kleodora was loved by Poseidon, and was the mother by him (or Kleopompos) of Parnassos (who founded the city of Parnassus) while Melaina was also loved by Apollo, and bore him Delphos (although another tradition names Thyia as the mother of Delphos).

These three bee maidens with the power of divination and thus speaking truth are described in the Homeric Hymn to Hermes, and the food of the gods is "identified as honey"; the bee maidens were originally associated with Apollo, and are probably not correctly identified with the Thriae. Both the Thriae and the Bee Maidens are credited with assisting Apollo in developing his adult powers, but the divination that Apollo learned from the Thriae differs from that of the Bee Maidens. The type of divination taught by the Thriae to Apollo was that of mantic pebbles, the throwing of stones, rather than the type of divination associated with the Bee Maidens and Hermes: cleromancy, the casting of lots. Honey, according to a Greek myth, was discovered by a nymph called Melissa ("Bee"); and honey was offered to the Greek gods from Mycenean times. Bees were associated, too, with the Delphic oracle and the prophetess was sometimes called a bee.
