= Melaina =

Greek nymph, lover of Apollo

In Greek mythology, Melaena or Melena /mɪˈliːnə/ (Ancient Greek: Μέλαινα, romanized: Mélaina, feminine Ancient Greek: μέλᾱς, romanized: mélās "black, dark"), Melane /ˈmɛləniː/ (Koine Greek: Μελανή, romanized: Melanḗ) or Melanis was a Corycian nymph, or member of the prophetic Thriae, of the springs of Delphi in Phocis.

== Family ==
Melaena's father was one of the local river gods, either Kephisos or Pleistos of northern Boeotia. In another account, she was called the daughter of King Hyamus of Hyampolis and Melanthea (Melantho), daughter of Deucalion. Her sister was called Celaeno.

Melanis was loved by Apollo and bore him Delphos, eponym of Delphi.

== Mythology ==
Melaina was often identified with Thyia who was also named as the mother of Delphos in other traditions.
