= Parna =

Parna may refer to:

- Parna (geology), a type of windblown sediment
- Parna (genus), a genus of insect
- Pärna, a village in Hiiu County, northwestern Estonia
- Pärna, Lääne-Viru County, a village in northeastern Estonia
- Ibnu Parna (died 1965), an Indonesian politician and trade unionist

== See also ==
- Parnas (disambiguation)
