= List of shipwrecks in July 1872 =

The list of shipwrecks in July 1872 includes ships sunk, foundered, grounded, or otherwise lost during July 1872.

== 1 July ==
List of shipwrecks: 1 July 1872
Ship	State	Description
Forth, and Hugh Streatfield	United Kingdom	The steamship Forth collided with the steamship Hugh Streatfield in the Elbe. Both vessels were beached. Forth was on a voyage from Hamburg, Germany to London. Hugh Streatfield was on a voyage from an English port to Hamburg. She was refloated the next day and towed in to Hamburg.
Katrina	United Kingdom	The ship ran aground off Dragør, Denmark. Her crew were rescued. She was on a voyage from Grangemouth, Stirlingshire and/or Leith, Lothian to Danzig, Germany. She was refloated.
Omaha	United Kingdom	The ship was wrecked in a cyclone at Saugor, India with the loss of seven or 70 of her crew. She was on a voyage from Liverpool, Lancashire to Calcutta, India.
Ringende Jacob	Germany	The barque was driven ashore and wrecked at Punta Carretas, Uruguay. She was on a voyage from Buenos Aires, Argentina to an English port.
Rothesay	United Kingdom	The ship was wrecked near Midnapore, India with the loss of seventeen of her 26 crew. She was on a voyage from Calcutta to Bombay.
South Eastern	India	The barque was wrecked at East London, Cape Colony with the loss of five of her crew. She was on a voyage from Calcutta to Algoa Bay.

== 2 July ==
List of shipwrecks: 2 July 1872
Ship	State	Description
Baider	Flag unknown	The steamship ran aground at Visby, Sweden. She was refloated.
Dacian	United Kingdom	The steamship ran aground in the Suez Canal. She was refloated on 4 July and resumed her voyage.
George Clifford	United States	The schooner sank off Harpswell, Maine Crew saved.
Lapwing	United Kingdom	The steamship collided with the barque Abbey Holme (United Kingdom) and sank in the English Channel 18 nautical miles (33 km) off the Isle of Wight with the loss of 21 of the 28 people on board. Three of the survivors were rescued by Abbey Holme. The remaining four survivors were rescued by the steamships Elaine and Rhine (both United Kingdom). Lapwing was on a voyage from Liverpool, Lancashire to Rotterdam, South Holland, Netherlands.
William Connal	United Kingdom	The steamship was driven ashore. She was on a voyage from Bordeaux, Gironde to the Clyde.

== 3 July ==
List of shipwrecks: 3 July 1872
Ship	State	Description
Gabriella	United Kingdom	The ship ran aground on the Pearl Rock, off Gibraltar. She was on a voyage from Carloforte, Sardinia, Italy to Swansea, Glamorgan. She was refloated and taken in to Gibraltar.
Glad Tidings	Canada	The ship was abandoned off Cape Sable Island, Nova Scotia. She was on a voyage from Halifax, Nova Scotia to New York. She was towed in to Clark's Harbour, Nova Scotia on 8 July and beached. She was subsequently refloated.
Isabella Leith	United Kingdom	The ship ran aground on the Nore. She was on a voyage from Leith, Lothian to Gravesend, Kent.
Martin Luther	Norway	The brig was wrecked on the Damsel Rocks, off the Isle of Skye, Outer Hebrides, United Kingdom. Her nine crew survived.
Minerva	United Kingdom	The barque ran aground at Kertch, Russia. She was refloated on 5 July.
Pacific	United States	The ship ran aground at Sagua la Grande, Cuba. All on board were rescued. She was on a voyage from New Orleans, Louisiana to Sagua la Grande. She was refloated.
Thistle	United Kingdom	The schooner was driven ashore and wrecked on Inchgarvie.

== 4 July ==
List of shipwrecks: 4 July 1872
Ship	State	Description
Athol	United Kingdom	The steamship was driven ashore on Saint Helen's Island, Quebec, Canada. She was on a voyage from Montreal, Quebec to Waterford. She was refloated.
Harriet King	New Zealand	The 184-ton brigantine stranded near Cape Colville, Coromandel Peninsula in a gale while en route from Lyttelton Harbour to Auckland and became a wreck.
Parnassus	United Kingdom	The steamship was wrecked at Cape Guardafui, Majerteen Sultanate. Her crew were rescued by Delhi (United Kingdom). Parnassus was on a voyage from Hankou, China to London.
Retriever	United Kingdom	The brig ran aground in the Gulf of Smyrna.

== 5 July ==
List of shipwrecks: 5 July 1872
Ship	State	Description
Arequipa	United States	The ship caught fire in the Atlantic Ocean and was abandoned. Her crew were rescued by Bloomer (United Kingdom). Arequipa was on a voyage from New York to Great Yarmouth, Norfolk, United Kingdom.
Australia	United Kingdom	The ship was wrecked at Rangoon, Burma.
Brothers	United Kingdom	The smack struck the Swilly Rock, in the Menai Strait and sank. Her crew were rescued. She was on a voyage from Liverpool, Lancashire to Caernarfon.

== 6 July ==
List of shipwrecks: 6 July 1872
Ship	State	Description
Deux Frères	France	The ship was wrecked off Portsall, Finistère. She was on a voyage from Brest, Finistère to an English port.
England	United Kingdom	The full-rigged ship was abandoned off Alibag, India and came ashore there. She was on a voyage from Cardiff, Glamorgan to Bombay, India.
Rodolfo	Austria-Hungary	The barque was destroyed by fire at Sulina, Ottoman Empire.
Waterwitch	United Kingdom	The smack foundered in the Irish Sea 20 nautical miles (37 km) off the Saltee Islands, County Wexford with the loss of one of her three crew. Survivors were rescued by the schooner Elizabeth (United Kingdom). Waterwitch was on a voyage from a Welsh port to Carrickfergus, County Antrim.

== 7 July ==
List of shipwrecks: 7 July 1872
Ship	State	Description
Olive	United Kingdom	The ship foundered in the Bristol Channel off Steep Holm. Her crew were rescued. She was on a voyage from Cardiff, Glamorgan to Highbridge, Somerset.

== 8 July ==
List of shipwrecks: 8 July 1872
Ship	State	Description
Ericksen	United Kingdom	The ship ran aground at South Shields, County Durham.
Margaret Jane	United Kingdom	The ship was driven ashore at Vigo, Spain. She was on a voyage from Cardiff, Glamorgan to Vigo.
Maria	United Kingdom	The steamship was driven ashore in the Hooghly River.
Milliza	Austria-Hungary	The barque foundered off "Buslin Island", Spain. Her crew were rescued.
Mystery	United Kingdom	The ship ran aground on the Batten Reef, off Plymouth, Devon. She was refloated and resumed her voyage.
Solway	United Kingdom	The ship was wrecked at Calcutta, India with some loss of life.

== 9 July ==
List of shipwrecks: 9 July 1872
Ship	State	Description
Dande	United Kingdom	The steamship was wrecked between Little Fish Bay and Moçâmedes, Portuguese Angola. All on board were rescued. She was on a voyage from Benguela to Moçâmedes.
Scotia	United Kingdom	The sloop was wrecked in the Crosby Channel.

== 10 July ==
List of shipwrecks: 10 July 1872
Ship	State	Description
Earl of Ellesmere	United Kingdom	The tug collided with the ship Bosphorus (United Kingdom) and sank in the River Mersey.
Fanny Alice	Leeward Islands	The ship was wrecked. She was on a voyage from Saint Thomas, Virgin Islands to "Ronaldo".

== 11 July ==
List of shipwrecks: 11 July 1872
Ship	State	Description
Annie	United Kingdom	The schooner ran aground at Goodwick, Pembrokeshire. She was on a voyage from Maryport, Cumberland to Rotterdam, South Holland, Netherlands. She was refloated and taken in to Aberystwyth, Cardiganshire.
Bosphorus	United Kingdom	The steamship was run into by the steamship Dagmar (United Kingdom) in the River Mersey and was severely damaged. She was taken in to by the tug Dispatch (United Kingdom) with the intention of docking her, but she sank.
Helen	United Kingdom	The ship sprang a leak and was beached at Grimsby, Lincolnshire.
Rooparel	India	The ship was driven ashore at Hospital Point, in the Hooghly River. She was on a voyage from London, United Kingdom to Calcutta. She was refloated on 19 July.

== 12 July ==
List of shipwrecks: 12 July 1872
Ship	State	Description
Hankow	United Kingdom	The steamship was lost off Cape Guardafui, Majeerteen Sultanate. Her crew were rescued.
Harry Warren	United Kingdom	The ship was wrecked at False Point, India. Three of her crew were rescued; her officers were unaccounted for. She was on a voyage from Liverpool, Lancashire to Calcutta, India.
Torino	Italy	The barque was damaged by an onboard explosion at North Shields, Northumberland, United Kingdom. Three of her crew were severely wounded.

== 13 July ==
List of shipwrecks: 13 July 1872
Ship	State	Description
Charles Tennant	United Kingdom	The steamship was driven ashore at Whitby, Yorkshire. She was on a voyage from South Shields, County Durham to Galaţi, Ottoman Empire. She was refloated and put back to South Shields.
Providence	United Kingdom	The smack ran aground on the Lark Sand, in the Bristol Channel and sank. She was on a voyage from Newport, Monmouthshire to Bridgwater, Somerset.

== 14 July ==
List of shipwrecks: 14 July 1872
Ship	State	Description
Excelsior	United Kingdom	The steamship ran aground on the Shah-Ali Reef. She was on a voyage from London to Calcutta, India. She was refloated and resumed her voyage.
Great Australia	United Kingdom	The ship was wrecked on the Baragon Flat, off the coast of Burma. Her crew were rescued.
Morton	United Kingdom	The steamship ran aground at Hayle, Cornwall.

== 15 July ==
List of shipwrecks: 15 July 1872
Ship	State	Description
Eskdale	United Kingdom	The steamship was driven ashore and wrecked 2 nautical miles (3.7 km) north of Staithes, Yorkshire. Her thirteen crew were rescued. She was on a voyage from Bergen, Norway to Tarragona, Spain.

== 16 July ==
List of shipwrecks: 16 July 1872
Ship	State	Description
Ajax	United Kingdom	The ship ran aground in the Suez Canal.
Alice	New Zealand	The 21-ton schooner ran aground on the bar at the mouth of the Pōrangahau River and became a wreck.
Corsair's Bride	United Kingdom	The ship departed from The Downs for Cárdenas, Cuba. No further trace, presumed foundered with the loss of all hands.
Earl of Arran	United Kingdom	The steamship ran aground on the Irishman's Ledge, off St Martin's, Isles of Scilly and was beached on Nornour. All 108 people on board were rescued. She was on a voyage from Penzance, Cornwall to the Isles of Scilly. She broke in two the next day.

== 17 July ==
List of shipwrecks: 17 July 1872
Ship	State	Description
Elizabeth and Catherine	United Kingdom	The ship ran aground at Kertch, Russia. She was on a voyage from Sunderland, County Durham to Kertch. She was refloated.
Maggie Smith	United Kingdom	The derelict ship was discovered in a waterlogged condition off Corvo Island, Azores and was beached there.
Tally Ho	United Kingdom	The ship was driven ashore near Baltrum, Germany. Her crew were rescued.
Tivano	United States	The schooner was lost on Green Island Ledge off Portland, Maine crew saved.

== 18 July ==
List of shipwrecks: 18 July 1872
Ship	State	Description
Antonin	Russia	The ship ran aground. She was on a voyage from Leith, Lothian, United Kingdom to Saint Petersburg.
Catherine	France	The lugger foundered in the Dogger Bank. Her crew survived.
Marianna VII	Brazil	The ship ran aground on the Diamond Reef. She was on a voyage from New York, United States to Santos. She was refloated and put back to New York in a leaky condition.
Urda	Norway	The ship was abandoned between Hirtshals and Hanstholmen, Denmark. Her crew were rescued. She was on a voyage from Tønsberg to Berwick upon Tweed, Northumberland, United Kingdom.

== 19 July ==
List of shipwrecks: 19 July 1872
Ship	State	Description
Eendraght	Sweden	The ship was wrecked at Lemvig, Norway. She was on a voyage from Nyköping to the Firth of Forth.

== 20 July ==
List of shipwrecks: 20 July 1872
Ship	State	Description
Abbotsford	United Kingdom	The ship ran aground at Bamburgh, Northumberland. She was on a voyage from Gävle, Sweden to Alnmouth, Northumberland.
Cetiverte Dubrocacki	Flag unknown	The ship ran aground at Queenstown, County Cork, United Kingdom. She was on a voyage from New York, United States to Queenstown.
Mary Durkee	United States	The ship ran aground off Newcastle, Delaware. She was on a voyage from Philadelphia, Pennsylvania to Dublin, United Kingdom.

== 21 July ==
List of shipwrecks: 21 July 1872
Ship	State	Description
Frank Lovett	United Kingdom	The barque was abandoned in the Atlantic Ocean. Her crew were rescued by Sunbeam (United Kingdom). Frank Lovett was on a voyage from Antwerp, Belgium to Philadelphia, Pennsylvania, United States.

== 22 July ==
List of shipwrecks: 22 July 1872
Ship	State	Description
Carl	Germany	The brig ran aground at the mouth of the Tonalá River and was wrecked.
Doverie	Russia	The steamship ran aground in the Don. On being refloated she was holed by her anchor and sank.
Vale of Lorton	United Kingdom	The steamship ran aground at Cap-Haïtien, Haiti. She was on a voyage from Havre de Grâce, Seine-Inférieure, France to Cap-Haïtien. She was refloated and taken in to Cap-Haïtien.

== 23 July ==
List of shipwrecks: 23 July 1872
Ship	State	Description
New England	United States	The steamship was wrecked on the Wolves. All on board were rescued. She was on a voyage from Saint John, New Brunswick, Canada to Eastport, Maine.

== 24 July ==
List of shipwrecks: 24 July 1872
Ship	State	Description
Dunkeld	United Kingdom	The brigantine ran aground at the entrance to the Second Bocas. She was on a voyage from Demerara, British Guiana to Port of Spain, Trinidad.
Hydra	New Zealand	The 585-ton barque left Newcastle, New South Wales bound for New Zealand, on 2 July. She hit rough weather and seas in the Tasman Sea and started taking on water. She approached the bottom of the South Island on 15 July, making slow progress in a heavy gale, taking onboard some 20 inches (51 cm) of water per hour. She signalled the passing ship Ottawa (Flag unknown) on 22 July, which stayed alongside. On 24 July, when she was close to the Solander Islands, Hydra's engine broke down, and the crew abandoned her and were taken on board Ottawa.

== 25 July ==
List of shipwrecks: 25 July 1872
Ship	State	Description
Blyth	United Kingdom	The steamship was driven ashore and wrecked 8 nautical miles (15 km) north of Cape St. Vincent, Portugal. Her crew survived. She was on a voyage from Newcastle upon Tyne, Northumberland to Alexandria, Egypt.
Lady Lycett	United Kingdom	The steamship ran aground in the Saint Lawrence River. She was on a voyage from Cardiff, Glamorgan to Montreal, Quebec, Canada.
Shark	United Kingdom	The schooner was driven ashore and wrecked in Helen's Bay, County Down. Her crew were rescued. She was on a voyage from Ardrossan, Ayrshire to Belfast, County Antrim.

== 26 July ==
List of shipwrecks: 26 July 1872
Ship	State	Description
Esk	United Kingdom	The schooner was wrecked in the Farne Islands, Northumberland.
Jean	United Kingdom	The ship was driven ashore and wrecked near Carnlough, County Antrim. She was on a voyage from Buncrana, County Donegal to Liverpool, Lancashire.
Scrabster	United Kingdom	The steamship ran aground at Emden, Germany.
Union	United Kingdom	The barque ran aground at Sandsend, Yorkshire. She was refloated.

== 27 July ==
List of shipwrecks: 27 July 1872
Ship	State	Description
Aurora	New Zealand	The 42-ton schooner was wrecked at the mouth of the Catlins River while carrying timber to Oamaru.
Catharina	Denmark	The ship struck the Bass Rock. She foundered the next day with the loss of her captain from her four crew. She was on a voyage from Bremerhaven to East Wemyss, Fife, United Kingdom.
Speedwell	United Kingdom	The steamship collided with the steamship Olinda (United Kingdom) and sank in the Humber. She was on a voyage from Ipswich, Suffolk to Hull, Yorkshire.

== 28 July ==
List of shipwrecks: 28 July 1872
Ship	State	Description
L'Esperance	France	The lugger ran aground off St. John's Point, Caithness, United Kingdom and consequently sank in the Pentland Firth off John o' Groats. Her twenty crew were rescued.
Volante	United Kingdom	The schooner caught fire at Dublin and was scuttled.

== 29 July ==
List of shipwrecks: 29 July 1872
Ship	State	Description
Astrologer	United Kingdom	The steamship ran aground on the Madjers Bank, in Kavak Bay and was damaged. She was on a voyage from Taganrog, Russia to Liverpool, Lancashire. She was refloated and resumed her voyage.
London	United Kingdom	The ship foundered off Pointe de Corsen, Finistère, France. She was on a voyage from Cardiff, Glamorgan to Brest, Finistère.
Vencedor	United States of Colombia	The steamship suffered a boiler explosion and was beached in the Magdalena River. Twelve of her crew were killed. She was on a voyage from Santa Martha to Honda.
Violet	United Kingdom	The ship ran aground on the Leman Sands, in the North Sea. She was on a voyage from Gothenburg, Sweden to Neath, Glamorgan. She was refloated and found to be waterlogged.

== 30 July ==
List of shipwrecks: 30 July 1872
Ship	State	Description
Alert	United Kingdom	The brig ran aground at Wexford. She was on a voyage from Galaţi, Ottoman Empire to Wexford. She was refloated.
Edward	United States	The ship was destroyed by fire at Hunters Point, New York.
Elpis	United Kingdom	The ship was destroyed by fire at Hunters Point.
Flora	United Kingdom	The fishing boat capsized and sank in the English Channel 4 nautical miles (7.4 km) off Seaton, Devon with the loss of two of her three crew.
Grace Peile	United Kingdom	The ship was wrecked on the coast of the Colony of Natal.
Max	United States	The ship was destroyed by fire at Hunters Point.
Seven unnamed vessels	Flags unknown	The ships were destroyed by fire at Hunters Point.

== 31 July ==
List of shipwrecks: 31 July 1872
Ship	State	Description
Breidablik	Netherlands	The ship was wrecked on the coast of the Colony of Natal.
G. F. Gibbon	United Kingdom	The brigantine sprang a leak and foundered in the Irish Sea 40 nautical miles (74 km) off Cork. Her crew survived. She was on a voyage from London to Troon, Ayrshire.
Good Intent	United Kingdom	The sloop was driven ashore and wrecked at Scoughall, Lothian.
Lahloo	United Kingdom	The clipper was wrecked on Sandalwood Island, Fiji. Her crew survived. She was on a voyage from Shanghai, China to London.
Princess Alice	United Kingdom	The schooner barque was wrecked on the bar of Port Natal after arriving from Copenhagen. She lost anchors in a gale.
Proteus	Netherlands	The barque sprang a leak and foundered off Hirtshals, Denmark. Her crew were rescued. She was on a voyage from Liverpool, Lancashire, United Kingdom to Riga, Russia.
Trinculo	United Kingdom	The ship was wrecked on the coast of the Colony of Natal.

== Unknown date ==
List of shipwrecks: Unknown date in July 1872
Ship	State	Description
Abbey Craig	United Kingdom	The ship ran aground at Sagua la Grande, Cuba.
Alessandro Volta	Italy	The steamship ran aground near "Zano". She was refloated.
Alida	Norway	The brig was wrecked at "Lenning", Denmark. She was on a voyage from Hartlepool, County Durham, United Kingdom to Aarhus, Denmark.
Azalea	United Kingdom	The barque ran aground at La Tunara, Spain. She was on a voyage from Thessaloniki, Greece to Boston. She was refloated.
Bengal	United Kingdom	The barque was abandoned at sea. Her crew were rescued by Alice Cameron (United Kingdom).
Boildien	France	The brig was driven ashore near the "Moreau Lighthouse".
British Navy	United Kingdom	The ship ran aground at Saugor, India before 9 July. She was on a voyage from Liverpool, Lancashire to Calcutta, India. She was refloated and taken in to Calcutta.
Brownstone	United Kingdom	The ship was abandoned at sea.
Catherina Cornelia	Germany	The ship was driven ashore on Fehmarn. She was on a voyage from Lübeck to London, United Kingdom.
Celt	United Kingdom	The steamship ran aground in the Hooghly River. She was on a voyage from Calcutta to "Damrah".
Champion	(United Kingdom of Great Britain and Ireland) Jersey	The barque was abandoned in the Indian Ocean off the mouth of the Ganges before 8 July. Her crew were rescued by Steonker (Flag unknown). Champion was on a voyage from Calcutta to Mauritius and Réunion.
Crido	United Kingdom	The ship was abandoned in the Atlantic Ocean before 20 July.
Christen	Norway	The barque ran aground at Gibraltar. She was on a voyage from Taganrog, Russia to Cork or Falmouth, Cornwall, United Kingdom. She was refloated with assistance from the tug Leon Belge ( (United Kingdom of Great Britain and Ireland) Gibraltar) and taken in to Gibraltar for repairs, but was consequently condemned.
Countess of Dublin	United Kingdom	The ship ran aground on the Goodwin Sands, Kent. She was refloated and resumed her voyage.
C. T. Sutton	United Kingdom	The ship was wrecked in Green Bay. She was on a voyage from Jersey, Channel Islands to Green Bay.
Emiliano	Spain	The steamship was driven ashore. She was on a voyage from Manila, Spanish East Indies to Liverpool. She was refloated and taken in to Singapore, Straits Settlements.
Florida	United States	The ship ran aground at Saint Thomas, Virgin Islands.
Flying Scud	United Kingdom	The ship ran aground on the Goodwin Sands. She was on a voyage from South Shields, County Durham to Messina, Sicily, Italy. She was refloated and taken in to Ramsgate, Kent in a leaky condition.
Frieda	United Kingdom	The steamship sprang a leak and was beached near Kingstown, County Dublin. She was on a voyage from Liverpool to Drogheda, County Louth.
Gazietta	Italy	The ship was wrecked at Agrigento, Sicily. Her crew were rescued.
Genna	Germany	The steamship sank off the lightship Ernst (Germany), off the mouth of the Elbe.
Georges	France	The ship ran aground at the mouth of the Rio Grande do Sul. She was on a voyage from the Rio Grande do Sul to Havre de Grâce, Seine-Inférieure.
Grecian	United Kingdom	The ship was abandoned in the Atlantic Ocean. Her crew were reported missing.
Haddon Hall	United Kingdom	The ship ran aground in the Hooghly River. She was on a voyage from Liverpool to Calcutta.
Isard	France	The ship was wrecked at Saint Domingo.
Laurence Alliance	United Kingdom	The ship ran aground on the Hook Sand. She was on a voyage from Saint-Malo, Ille-et-Vilaine, France to Poole, Dorset.
Lebanon	United Kingdom	The ship ran aground on the Beaufort Shoal, in the Saint Lawrence River. She was on a voyage from Trois-Rivières, Quebec, Canada to London.
Livonia	United Kingdom	The yacht ran aground at Havre de Grâce, Seine-Inférieure before 15 July. She was refloated and taken in to Southampton.
Mary E. Rigg	United Kingdom	The ship ran aground at Newcastle, County Down. She was on a voyage from Liverpool to New Orleans, Louisiana, United States.
Megaera	United Kingdom	The ship was wrecked at "Slaugkoss", Cape Colony.
Mount Royal	United Kingdom	The ship ran aground at Pensacola, Florida, United States. She was on a voyage from Pensacola to Liverpool. She was refloated and resumed her voyage.
Pilot	United Kingdom	The sloop foundered off the Point de Corsen, Finistère, France. She was on a voyage from Cardiff to Brest, Finistère.
Royal Adelaide	United Kingdom	The ship was driven ashore and wrecked at St. Jago de Cuba, Cuba. She was on a voyage from Swansea, Glamorgan to St. Jago de Cuba.
Suene	France	The schooner sprang a leak and was beached. She was on a voyage from Rotterdam, South Holland, Netherlands to Bordeaux, Gironde.
Toivo	Russia	The ship was driven ashore near the "Moireau Lighthouse". She was on a voyage from Grimsby, Lincolnshire, United Kingdom to Saint Petersburg.
Valente	United Kingdom	The ship was driven ashore at Tunis, Beylik of Tunis. She was refloated on 19 July and found to be leaky.
Volunteer	United Kingdom	The ship was wrecked on a reef. She was on a voyage from Demerara, British Guiana to Old Harbour, Jamaica.
William Penn	United Kingdom	The brig ran aground and was wrecked off Skagen, Denmark with the loss of five of her eight crew. She was on a voyage from Sunderland to Kronstadt, Russia.
Young Australia	Queensland	The ship was wrecked on Moreton Island before 11 July. Her crew survived.
