= Thyia (naiad) =

In Greek mythology, Thyia (/ˈθaɪə/; Ancient Greek: Θυία, romanized: Thyía, derived from the verb θύω, thýō, 'to sacrifice') was the Naiad-nymph of a spring on Mount Parnassos in Phokis (central Greece) and was a female figure associated with cults of several major gods.

== Mythology ==
In the Delphic tradition, Thyia was also the Naiad-nymph of a spring on Mount Parnassos in Phocis (central Greece), daughter of the river god Cephissus or the hero Castalius, one of the earliest inhabitants of Delphi or by other traditions Thyia was a daughter of Deucalion and had two sons by Zeus, Magnes and Macedon. Her shrine was the site for the gathering of the Thyiades (women who celebrated in the orgies= ancient religious ceremony of the god Dionysos).

She was said to have been the first to sacrifice to Dionysus and to celebrate orgies in his honour. Hence, the Attic women, who every year went to Mount Parnassus to celebrate the Dionysiac orgies with the Delphian Thyiades, received themselves the name of Thyades or Thyiades (synonymous with Maenads).

She was said to have loved Apollo and bore him a son, Delphos, the eponymous founder of town Delphi, beside the oracular shrine. She was also closely associated with the prophetic Castalian Spring, from which she was sometimes said to have been born (Pausanias follows a tradition that made her daughter of the autochthon Castalius). Thyia was also related to Castalia, the nymph of the spring; Melaena, an alternative mother for Delphos; and the Corycian nymphs, Naiades of the springs of the holy Corycian Cave.

Thyia was also reported to have had an affair with Poseidon, and to have been a close friend of Chloris, wife of Neleus, son of Poseidon.

A sacred precinct of Thyia was reported to have been located in the city of the same name, with an altar to the Anemoi set up during the Greco-Persian Wars.

The name was applied to the white cedar and its genus, Thuja, by Linnaeus (1753).

== Literature ==
Herodotus, Histories 7. 178. 1 (trans. Godley) (Greek historian C5th B.C.) : "[During the historical Persian War :] So with all speed the Greeks went their several ways to meet the enemy [the Persians]. In the meantime, the Delphians, who were afraid for themselves and for Hellas, consulted the god. They were advised to pray to the Anemoi (Winds), for these would be potent allies for Hellas. When they had received the oracle, the Delphians first sent word of it to those Greeks who desired to be free; because of their dread of the barbarian, they were forever grateful. Subsequently they erected an altar to the winds at Thyia, the present location of the precinct of Thyia the daughter of Kephisos (Cephisus), and they offered sacrifices to them."

Pausanias, Description of Greece 10. 6. 4 (trans. Jones) (Greek travelogue C2nd A.D.) : "Others maintain that Kastalios (Castalius) (of the Kastalian Spring), an aboriginal, had a daughter Thyia, who was the first to be priestess of Dionysos and celebrate orgies in honor of the god. It is said that later on men called after her Thyiades all women who rave in honor of Dionysos. At any rate they hold that Delphos (Delphus) was a son of Apollon and Thyia. Others say that his mother was Melaina (Melaena), daughter of Kephisos (Cephisus)."

THYIA (Thuia). A daughter of Castalius or Cephisseus became by Apollo, the mother of Delphus. (Paus. x. 6. § 2; Herod. vii. 178.) She is said to have been the first to have sacrificed to Dionysus and to have celebrated orgies in his honour. Hence the Attic women, who every year went to Mount Parnassus to celebrate the Dionysiac orgies with the Delphian Thyiades, received themselves the name of Thyades or Thyiades. (Paus. l.c. x. 4. § 2, 22. § 5; comp. 29. § 2; Lobeck, Aglaoph. p. 285.)
