= Cleodora =

Cleodora may refer to:

- Cleodora (plant) a section of the genus Croton
- In Greek mythology:
  - One of the Daughters of Danaus
  - Kleodora, one of the Thriae
