= Melantho =

Ancient Greek female name

In Greek mythology, Melantho (/mɪˈlænθoʊ/; Ancient Greek: Μελανθώ) may refer to the following women:

- Melantho, also called Melanthea, a Phthian princess as the daughter of King Deucalion and Pyrrha, daughter of Epimetheus and Pandora. She was the sister of Hellen, Protogenea and Amphictyon. Melanthea’s other possible siblings were Pandora, Thyia, Orestheus, Marathonios, Pronous and Candybus. Melantho was seduced by Poseidon the shape of a dolphin and by him, bore a son Delphus. In one account, Melantheia instead married King Hyamus of Hyampolis, son of Lycorus, and by him the mother of two daughters, Melanis and Celaeno of whom either might have been mother of Delphus by Apollo.
- Melantho, also called Melantomice, an Argive queen as the wife of King Criasus. She was the mother of Phorbas, Ereuthalion and Cleoboea.
- Melantho, the disloyal maid of Penelope.
