= Parnes =

Parnes may refer to:

People

- Anthony Parnes, English businessman
- Joseph Parnes, American money manager
- Larry Parnes, English music manager
- Laura Parnes, American video artist
- Sid Parnes, American professor

Places

- Parnes, Oise, France
- Parnitha, a mountain range in Greece

== See also ==
- Parnas (disambiguation)
