= Hyamus =

Greek mythological figure

In Greek mythology, Hyamus (Ancient Greek: Ὕαμος) was a son of Lycorus. It was related of him that after the Great Deluge, he became king over a people dwelling around Mount Parnassus, and founded Hyampolis. He was married to Melantheia, a daughter of Deucalion, and had at least two daughters, Celaeno and Melanis, of whom either might have been mother of Delphus.
