= Lycoreia =

Lycoreia or Lykoreia (Ancient Greek: Λυκώρεια) was a town of ancient Phocis situated upon one of the heights of Parnassus above the sanctuary of Delphi, whence came the population of Delphi. This town is said to have been founded by Deucalion and was named after Lycorus, son of Apollo and the nymph Corycia, and from it the Delphian nobles, at all events, derived their origin. Hence, Plutarch tells us that the five chief-priests of the god, called osioi (Ὅσιοι), were chosen by lot from a number of families who derived their descent from Deucalion. It appears the inhabitants of Lycoreia were Dorians, who had spread from the Dorian Tetrapolis over the heights of Parnassus. At all events, we know that a Doric dialect was spoken at Delphi, and the Oracle of Delphi always showed a leaning towards the Greeks of the Doric race. Moreover, that the Delphians were of a different race from the Phocians is clear from the antipathy which always existed between the two peoples.

The location of Lycoreia has not been fixed with precision, although some identify it with the modern village of Liakouri, where some ruins of ancient walls remain.
