= Eirene (daughter of Poseidon) =

In Greek mythology, Eirene (/aɪˈriːni/; Ancient Greek: Εἰρήνη, romanized: Eirḗnē, lit. 'Peace', Ancient Greek pronunciation: [eːrɛ̌ːnɛː]) or Irene, was a daughter of Poseidon and Melanthea, daughter of Alpheus. She gave her name to Eirene, a small island near the Peloponnese. The island was later called Anthedonia and Hypereia, but eventually received the name Calauria after Calaurus, who was also a son of Poseidon.
