= Polydrosos =

Polydrosos Πολύδροσος
- Community
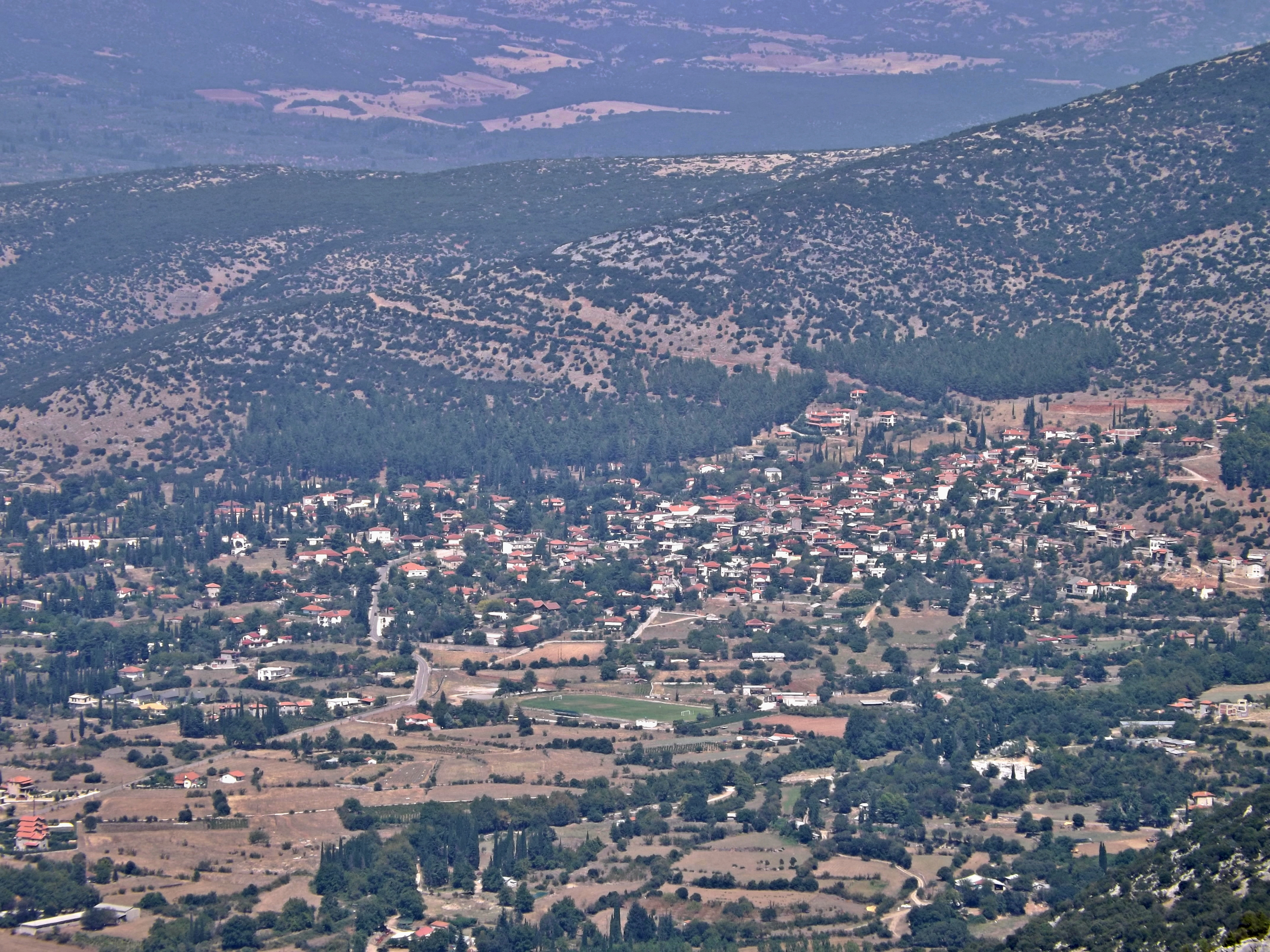
- Panorama of Polydrosos.

- Location within Greece
- Coordinates: 38°38.4′N 22°31.9′E
- Country: Greece
- Administrative region: Central Greece
- Regional unit: Phocis
- Municipality: Delphi
- Municipal unit: Parnassos

Area
  - Community: 38.672 km^{2} (14.931 sq mi)
- Elevation: 384 m (1,260 ft)

Population (2021)
  - Community: 1,027
  - Density: 26.56/km^{2} (68.78/sq mi)
- Time zone: UTC+2 (EET)
  - Summer (DST): UTC+3 (EEST)
- Postal code: 330 51
- Area code: +30-2234
- Vehicle registration: AM

Polydrosos (Greek: Πολύδροσος) is a village and a community of the Delphi municipality. Before the 2011 local government reform it was a part of the municipality of Parnassos, of which it was a municipal district. The community of Polydrosos covers an area of 38.672 km^{2}.

== History ==
Signs of civilization in the area are going back in the early-Greek era (3rd millennium BC). After the destruction of some phocis cities and settlements from Philip II of Macedon, the ancient city of Lilaea merged with the near town of Erochus that was placed in the nowadays Polydrosos cemetery area.

== Administrative division ==
The community of Polydrosos consists of three separate settlements:

- Ano Polydrosos (population 13 as of 2021)
- Livadi (uninhabited)
- Polydrosos (population 1,014)

== Population ==
Historical population
Year	Pop.	±%
2001	1,231	—
2011	1,166	−5.3%
2021	1,027	−11.9%

== See also ==
- List of settlements in Phocis
