= Phemonoe =

Mythical prophet at Delphi

In Greek mythology, Phemonoë ( /fiˈmɒnoʊ.i/; Ancient Greek: Φημονόη, romanized: Phēmonoē, lit. 'speaker of thoughts', 'thinker of oracular speech' or 'she who turns the thoughts of the mind into voice') was a Greek poet of the ante-Homeric period. She was said to have been the daughter of Apollo, his first priestess at Delphi, or of his possible son Delphus, and the inventor of the hexameter verses, a type of poetic metre.

== Mythology ==
In some studies, the phrase "know thyself" (γνῶθι σεαυτόν), found inscribed at the entrance to the Temple of Apollo at Delphi, has been attributed to her. Some writers seem to have placed her at Delos instead of Delphi; and Servius identifies her with the Cumaean Sibyl. The tradition which ascribed to her the invention of the hexameter, was by no means uniform; Pausanias, for example, as quoted above, calls her the first who used it, but in another passage he quotes an hexameter distich, which was ascribed to the Peleiades, who lived before Phemonoe: the traditions respecting the invention of the hexameter are collected by Fabricius. There were poems which went under the name of Phemonoe, like the old religious poems which were ascribed to Orpheus, Musaeus, and the other mythological bards. Melampus, for example, quotes from her in his book Peri Palmon Mantike ("On Twitches") §17, §18; and Pliny quotes from her respecting eagles and hawks, evidently from some book of augury, and perhaps from a work which is still extant in MS., entitled Orneosophium. There is an epigram of Antipater of Thessalonica, alluding to a statue of Phemonoe, dressed in a pharos.
