= Parna (geology) =

Parna is a windblown sediment, in many ways similar to loess. It is found in the Riverina Plains, in south-east Australia. It was named by Bruce Butler, a pedologist working for CSIRO in 1956. Parna is an aeolian deposit, like loess, but the particles are small clay mineral agglomerates. The material sources are dried up lakes and river floodplains. It has been described as calcareous red clay material, of aeolian origin, that blankets large parts of the Murrumbidgee and Murray River valleys.
