= Parnas (surname) =

Parnas is a surname. Notable people with the surname include:

- Aaron Parnas, American lawyer
- David Parnas (born 1941), Canadian software engineer
- Jakub Karol Parnas (1884–1949), Jewish-Polish-Soviet biochemist
- Josef Parnas (born 1950), Danish psychiatrist
- Leslie Parnas (1931–2022), American cellist
- Maya Parnas (born 1974), Transnistrian politician
- Lev Parnas (born 1972), American businessman
- Michal Parnas, Israeli computer scientist
