= Parnassus (ship) =

Several vessels have been named Parnassus, for the mountain Parnassus.

- Parnassus, of 60 tons (bm), was launched at Liverpool in 1757. Captain John Gillman sailed from Liverpool on 22 May 1760, bound on an enslaving voyage. He acquired captives at Bassa and left Africa on 5 November. As Parnassus, Gilman, master, was on her way to the West Indies, two French East Indiamen captured her and sent her to Martinique.
- Parnassus, of 220, or 270 tons (bm), was built on the Thames in 1753 or 1754. She was the former Pearl.
- Parnassus (1769 ship) was launched on the Thames in 1769. She first sailed as a West Indiaman. She twice encountered enemy privateers: the first time she repelled them, but the second time she was captured. A British privateer recaptured her. Parnassus became a whaler in the British northern whale fishery. In 1794 Parnassus was one of the transports at the Battle of Martinique. The troop transport Parnassus was lost at Corsica in late 1796 with heavy loss of life. She was last listed in 1796.
- Parnassus, of 465 tons (bm (old)), was launched at Richibucto in 1861.
- Parnassus, of 1,637 GRT, was 281 ft 3 in (85.7 m) in length, 34 ft 0 in (10.4 m) in beam, and 23 ft 8 in (7.2 m) in depth of hold. She was an iron-hulled, screw steamship, with a 200HP engine, and five bulk holds. The London & Glasgow Engineering & Iron Shipbuilding. Co., Govan, launched her on 23 December 1871. She was wrecked on 4 July 1872, at Cape Guardafui, Majerteen Sultanate. Delhi rescued her crew. Parnassus was on a voyage from Hankou, China to London with a cargo of tea.
