= Parnassus (Cappadocia) =

Town in the northern part of ancient Cappadoci

Coordinates: 39°03′17″N 33°35′13″E

Parnassus or Parnassos (Ancient Greek: Παρνασσός) was a town in the northern part of ancient Cappadocia, on the right bank of the Halys River, and on or near a hill, to which it owed its name, on the road between Ancyra and Archelais, about 63 miles west of the latter town. It became a bishopric and remains a Roman Catholic titular see.

== History ==
As a town in the Late Roman province of Cappadocia Tertia, Parnassus was important enough to become a suffragan bishopric of the Metropolitan of Mocissus, in the sway of the Patriarchate of Constantinople. Its site is near modern Parlasan, Şereflikoçhisar.

Several of its bishops were historically documented :

- Pancratius, an Arian heretical schismatic, among the dissident bishops which left the Council of Sardica and held a small council at Philippopolis (now Plovdiv Bulgaria) issuing a separate Arian position.
- Ipsius and Ecditius, whom Church Father Saint Basil the Great of Caesarea Mazaca in Cappadocia mentioned in a letter
- Eustachius I participated over his 30 years term in various major synods: the council of Ephesus in 431, opposing the profession of faith; the Synod of Constantinople of 448 convoked by Patriarch Flavian of Constantinople to condemn heretical anti-Nestorian archimandrite Eutyches; the Council of Chalcedon in 451; he also signed in 458 the letter of the bishops of Cappadocia to Byzantine emperor Leo I the Thracian after the Coptic mob-murder of Patriarch Proterius of Alexandria and signed the synodal decree of Patriarch (saint) Gennadius of Constantinople against simony around 459.
- Pelagius prese partook in the synod of Constantinople in 536 which Patriarch Mena called to condemn Antimus
- Eustachius II was present at the 'Robber' Council in Trullo in 692
- Stephanus attended the Second Council of Nicaea in 787
- Teognostus participated at the Council of Constantinople in 879-880 condemning Patriarch Photius I of Constantinople.

The bishopric is mentioned in the Byzantine imperial Notitiae Episcopatuum till the late 13th century, but it faded, apparently at the advent of Muslim Seljuks.

== Titular see ==
The diocese was nominally restored as a titular bishopric in 1895.

It is vacant, having had the following incumbents, all of the lowest (episcopal) rank :

- Johann Baptist Schneider (1896.06.25 – death 1905.01.26) as Auxiliary Bishop of Wien (Vienna, Austria) (1896.06.25 – 1905.01.26)
- Ludovic Joseph Legraive (1907.10.17 – death 1940.06.10) as Auxiliary Bishop of Mechelen (Mechlin, Belgium) (1907.10.17 – 1940.06.10)
- Arturo Mery Beckdorf (1941.03.22 – 1944.07.29), later Titular Archbishop of Phasis (1955.04.20 – 1976.05.28)
- Daniel Figueroa Villón (1945.04.12 – 1946.09.22) as Auxiliary Bishop of Antofagasta (Chile) (1941.03.22 – 1944.07.29); later Coadjutor Bishop of Valdivia (Chile) (1944.07.29 – 1955.04.20), Coadjutor Archbishop of Santiago (Chile) (1955.04.20 – 1961.05.14), Titular Archbishop of Phasis (1955.04.20 – 1976.05.28) as Auxiliary Bishop of La Serena (Chile) (1961.05.14 – 1963) promoted Coadjutor Archbishop of La Serena (Chile) (1963 – death 1976.05.28)
- Daniel Tavares Baeta Neves (1947.03.29 – 1958.05.16) as Auxiliary Bishop of Mariana (Brazil) (1947.03.29 – 1958.05.16); later Bishop of Januária (Brazil) (1958.05.16 – 1962.06.01), Titular Bishop of Alexandria Minor (1962.06.01 – 1964.06.04), Bishop of Sete Lagoas (Brazil) (1964.06.04 – death 1980.07.08)
- Adolfo Luís Bossi, Capuchin Friars (O.F.M. Cap.) (1958.06.18 – 2002.05.08) as Coadjutor Bishop-Prelate of São José do Grajaú (Brazil) (1958.06.18 – 1966.02.19), succeeding as Bishop-Prelate of São José do Grajaú (1966.02.19 – retired 1970.08.22), died 2002.
