= Parnassos (municipality) =

Parnassos Παρνασσός
- Municipal unit
- Location within the regional unit

- Location within Greece
- Coordinates: 38°38′N 22°31′E
- Country: Greece
- Administrative region: Central Greece
- Regional unit: Phocis
- Municipality: Delphi

Area
  - Municipal unit: 87.03 km^{2} (33.60 sq mi)

Population (2021)
  - Municipal unit: 1,610
  - Municipal unit density: 18.5/km^{2} (47.9/sq mi)
- Time zone: UTC+2 (EET)
  - Summer (DST): UTC+3 (EEST)
- Vehicle registration: ΑΜ

Parnassos (Greek: Παρνασσός) is a former municipality in Phocis, Greece, named after Mount Parnassus. Since the 2011 local government reform it is part of the municipality Delphi, of which it is a municipal unit. The municipal unit has an area of 87.033 km^{2}. Population 1,610 (2021). The seat of the municipality was in Polydrosos.
