= Cleodora (nymph) =

Greek mythological figure

In Greek mythology, Kleodora or Cleodora (/kliːəˈdɔːrə/; Ancient Greek: Κλεοδώρα, romanized: Kleodôra, lit. 'glorious gift') was one of the Thriae, three nymphs who divined the future by throwing stones or pebbles, associated with the Oracle of Delphi. Her name comes from kleos ‘famous’ and dôron ‘gift’, in reference to her gift of prophecy.

== Mythology ==
Cleodora and her sisters Melaina and Daphnis lived on Mount Parnassus, where Delphi is located. By Poseidon (or Kleopompos), she was the mother of Parnassos, who created a method of telling the future using birds and founded the main city on Mt. Parnassus. Cleodora's father was Cephissus, a river god of northern Boeotia.

As a member of the Thriae, Cleodora is often conflated with the bee maidens of the Homeric Hymn to Hermes, from whom Apollo directs Hermes to learn prophecy.
