= Melantheia =

Daughter of Alpheus in Greek mythology

In Greek mythology, Melantheia or Melanthea (Ancient Greek: Μελανθείας) is the name of several figures:

- Melantheia, the daughter of Deucalion. According to a scholium on Euripides's Orestes, she was the mother of Melainis by Hyamus.
- Melantheia, the daughter of the river-god Alpheus. According to Plutarch's Greek Questions, she was, by Poseidon, the mother of Eirene, after whom the island of Calaurea was once known by the same name.
