= Castalia =

Water deity

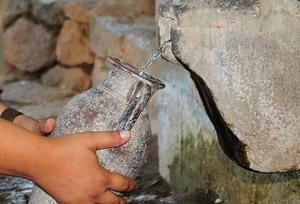
- Water Ritual at Delphi

Creature information
- Grouping: Legendary creature
- Sub grouping: Water spirit

Origin
- Country: Greece
- Region: Delphi

Castalia /kəˈsteɪliə/ (Ancient Greek: Κασταλία, romanized: Kastalia), in ancient Greek and Roman mythology, is a young nymph, a daughter of the river-god Achelous, who attracted the god Apollo and who is said to have flung herself into the sacred spring in Delphi when pursued by him. The spring took the name Castalia afterwards.

== Family ==
Castalia was the child of the river-god Achelous.

== Mythology ==
The Castalia or Castalian Spring was the name of a spring near Delphi, sacred to the Muses, mentioned by many authors. According to old traditions, the Castalian Spring already existed by the time Apollo came to Delphi searching for Python. According to some, the water was a gift to Castalia from the river Cephisus.

In his commentary on Statius's Thebaid, Latin poet Lactantius Placidus says that the virgin Castalia, trying to escape Apollo's unwanted amorous advances, threw herself into a fountain at Delphi, at the base of Mount Parnassus, or at Mount Helicon, which took her name thereafter. Castalia then became the sacred fountain of Poseidon.

== In culture ==
She inspired the genius of poetry to those who drank her waters or listened to their quiet sound; the sacred water was also used to clean the Delphian temples. Apollo consecrated Castalia to the Muses (Castaliae Musae).

The 20th-century German writer Hermann Hesse used Castalia as inspiration for the name of the futuristic fictional utopia in his 1943 magnum opus The Glass Bead Game. Castalia is home to an austere order of intellectuals with a twofold mission: to run boarding schools for boys, and to nurture and play the Glass Bead Game.

== See also ==
- Castalian Spring
- Castalia House
- 4769 Castalia, an Earth-crossing asteroid
- 646 Kastalia, an asteroid

== Bibliography ==
- Hamilton, Edith (1978). La Mythologie – ses dieux, ses héros, ses légendes (in French). Translated by Abeth de Beughem. Marabout Editions. ISBN 978-2-501-00264-6.
