= Lycorus =

Set of mythological Greek characters

In Greek mythology, Lycorus or Lycoreus (Ancient Greek: Λυκωρεύς) may refer to the following personages:

- Lycoreus or Lycorus, was a son of Apollo and the nymph Corycia. After him a city was named Lycoreia (later Delphi, after Delphus, great-grandson of Lycorus). He was father of Hyamus.
- Lycoreus, a companion of Amycus. was the henchman of King Amycus of the Bebrycians, people living in northern Asia Minor that were visited by the Argonauts.
- Lycoreus, a defender of Thebes in the war of the Seven against Thebes, killed by Amphiaraus.
