= Mount Parnassus =

Mountain of central Greece that hosts Delphi

Parnassus
- Παρνασσός
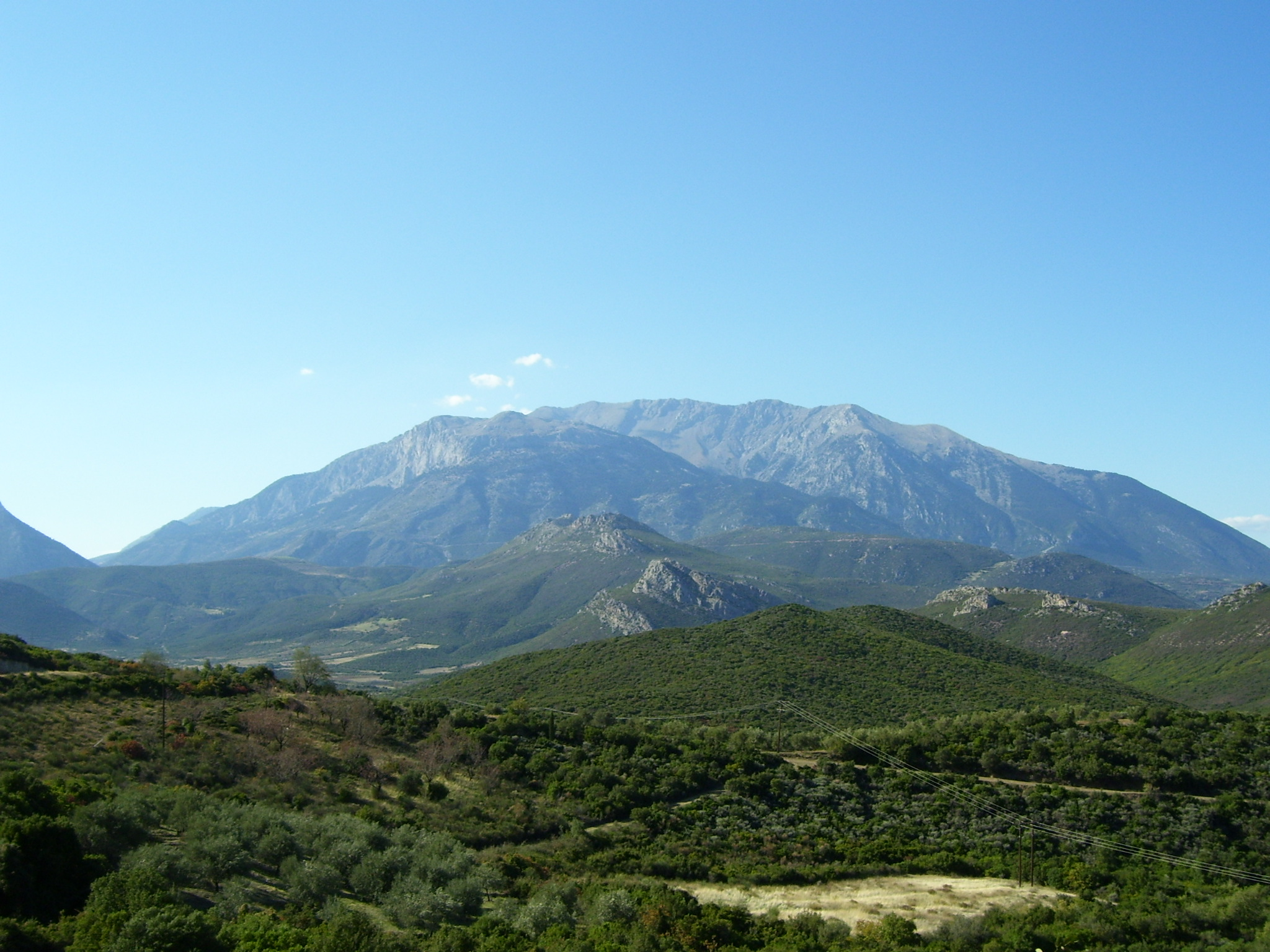
- Mount Parnassus

Highest point
- Elevation: 2,457 m (8,061 ft)
- Prominence: 1,590 m (5,220 ft)
- Listing: Ultra
- Coordinates: 38°32′09″N 22°37′27″E

Geography
- Location within Greece
- Location: Parnassos and Arachova, Central Greece

Climbing
- Easiest route: Hike

Mount Parnassus (/pɑːrˈnæsəs/; Greek: Παρνασσός, Parnassós) is a mountain range in Central Greece that is, and historically has been, especially culturally and religiously valuable to the Greek nation and the earlier Greek city-states. It is a major destination on a domestic and international level for athletic and cultural tourism. The mountain is also the location of historical, archaeological, and other cultural sites, such as the Oracle of Delphi perched on the southern slopes of the mountain in a rift valley north of the Gulf of Corinth.

Parnassus has an abundance of trails for hiking in the three warm seasons. In the winter, the entire range is open to skiing, especially from the resorts of Arachova. Its melting snows provide a source of municipal water for the surrounding communities. The mountain is composed of limestone, but also contains bauxite aluminum ore, which is mined and processed.

The mountain is mentioned in early Ancient Greek literature, and many of its ancient communities are cited in Homer's Iliad. It was home to the Dorian states in the region of Phocis, populated by speakers of Phokian, a Doric dialect of ancient Greek. The mountain was considered deeply sacred in ancient Greek religion, specifically to Dionysus and the Dionysian mysteries, to Apollo and the Corycian nymphs, and was also the home to the Muses, as well as the site of the "navel (omphalos) of the world" at Delphi.

== Etymology ==
There is a significant gap in the proto-history of the name Parnassos. Mycenaean Greek settlements were abundant to the south and east of the mount, and yet the name remains unattested in what is known of their language, Mycenaean Greek, written in Linear B script.

The philologist Leonard Robert Palmer suggested that Parnassus is a name derived from the Luwian language, one of the Anatolian languages. In his view, the name derives from parnassas, the possessive adjective of the Luwian word parna meaning house, or specifically temple, so the name effectively means the mountain of the house of the god. Such a derivation, being consistent with the reputation of the mountain as being a holy one, where the power of divinity is manifested, has always been considered a strong one, even by critics of the theory. Palmer goes on to postulate that some pre-Greek people were Anatolian, perhaps from an earlier wave of conquest, and that their country and facilities were taken by the proto-Greeks.

The consistency, however, ends there. With regard to a possible preponderance of the evidence, this one word remains an isolate. There is no historical or archaeological evidence to tie the name to an Anatolian presence. G. Mylonas, reviewing the possibilities, found nothing at all to tie the archaeology around the mountain to anything Anatolian, and although a probable Cretan connection has been detected, there is nothing to tie the Cretans to the Luwians. Linear A, the script of the Minoans, as the Cretans have been called, remains yet undeciphered. In summary, the ethnicity of the pre-Greek people or peoples, after many decades of scholarship, remains unknown, and there is yet no explanation of how and when this mountain was named with a Luwian name.

== Geology and geography ==
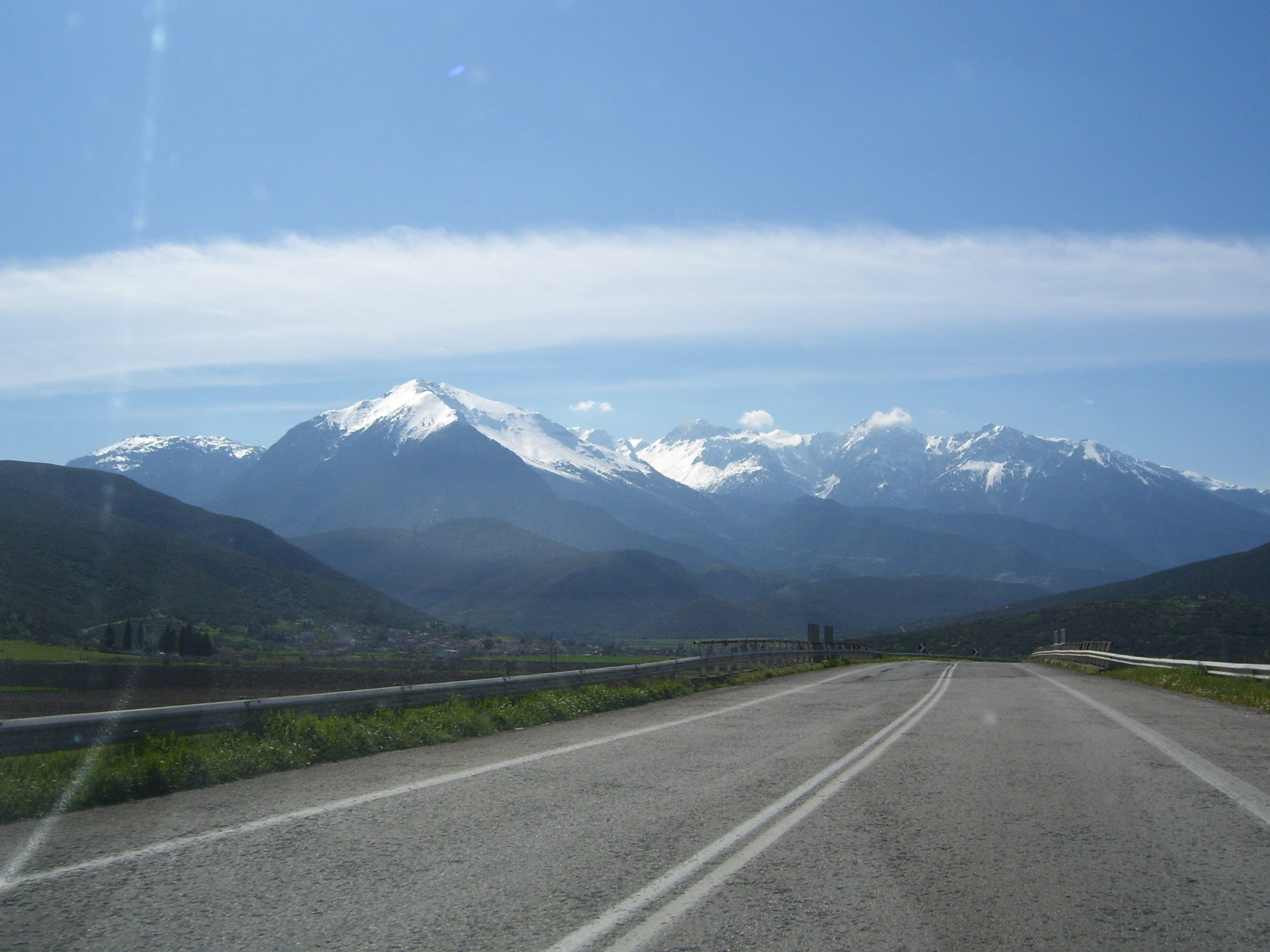
View of the range from the northeast

Parnassus is one of the largest mountainous regions of Mainland Greece and one of the highest Greek mountains. It spreads over three prefectures, namely Boeotia, Phthiotis and Phocis, where its largest part lies. Its altitude is 2,457 meters (8,061 feet), and its highest peak is Liakoura. To the northwest, it is connected to mount Giona and to the south to mount Kirphi.

The mountain is delimited to the east by the valley of the Boeotian Cephissus and to the west by the valley of Amfissa. An unusual geological feature of Parnassus is its rich deposits of bauxite, which has led to their systematic mining since the end of the 1930s, resulting in ecological damage to part of the mountain.

== Climate ==
Mount Parnassus has very cold winters and cool summers. Below the data of the World Meteorological Organization station in the doline of Vathistalos.

Climate data for Doline Vathistalos 1780 m a.s.l. (2017-2023)
| Month | Jan | Feb | Mar | Apr | May | Jun | Jul | Aug | Sep | Oct | Nov | Dec | Year |
|---|---|---|---|---|---|---|---|---|---|---|---|---|---|
| Record high °C (°F) | 12.0 (53.6) | 13.1 (55.6) | 13.5 (56.3) | 19.0 (66.2) | 26.9 (80.4) | 26.2 (79.2) | 28.8 (83.8) | 29.8 (85.6) | 25.0 (77.0) | 22.8 (73.0) | 18.5 (65.3) | 14.1 (57.4) | 29.8 (85.6) |
| Mean daily maximum °C (°F) | 2.1 (35.8) | 2.3 (36.1) | 4.1 (39.4) | 9.1 (48.4) | 13.8 (56.8) | 17.0 (62.6) | 20.3 (68.5) | 20.0 (68.0) | 16.2 (61.2) | 12.9 (55.2) | 7.8 (46.0) | 4.8 (40.6) | 10.9 (51.6) |
| Daily mean °C (°F) | −3.3 (26.1) | −2.7 (27.1) | −0.7 (30.7) | 3.5 (38.3) | 7.9 (46.2) | 10.7 (51.3) | 13.3 (55.9) | 13.5 (56.3) | 9.7 (49.5) | 6.3 (43.3) | 3.2 (37.8) | −0.4 (31.3) | 5.1 (41.2) |
| Mean daily minimum °C (°F) | −8.7 (16.3) | −7.6 (18.3) | −5.5 (22.1) | −2.2 (28.0) | 2.0 (35.6) | 4.3 (39.7) | 6.2 (43.2) | 6.9 (44.4) | 3.2 (37.8) | −0.3 (31.5) | −1.5 (29.3) | −5.6 (21.9) | −0.7 (30.7) |
| Record low °C (°F) | −28.6 (−19.5) | −23.9 (−11.0) | −28.1 (−18.6) | −16.0 (3.2) | −7.9 (17.8) | −5.8 (21.6) | −1.6 (29.1) | −3.3 (26.1) | −11.3 (11.7) | −14.1 (6.6) | −17.7 (0.1) | −27.9 (−18.2) | −28.6 (−19.5) |
| Average rainfall mm (inches) | 46.8 (1.84) | 45.5 (1.79) | 98.5 (3.88) | 52.1 (2.05) | 69.3 (2.73) | 54.1 (2.13) | 21.2 (0.83) | 40.1 (1.58) | 163.9 (6.45) | 81.8 (3.22) | 108.2 (4.26) | 146.6 (5.77) | 928.1 (36.53) |
Source 1: National Observatory of Athens Monthly Bulletins (Dec 2017 - Dec 2023)
Source 2: Vathistalos N.O.A station, World Meteorological Organization

== Mythology ==
Orpheus, life and events in Parnassus.

The ancient Greeks considered mount Parnassus to be named after Parnassos, son of the nymph Kleodora and the man Cleopompus. In the flood myth of Deucalion, the city of which Parnassos was the leader was flooded by torrential rains. The citizens ran from the flood, following the howling of wolves up the mountain slope, where the survivors built another city called Lycoreia, meaning "the howling of the wolves."

While Orpheus was living with his mother and his eight beautiful aunts on Parnassus, he met Apollo, who was courting the laughing muse Thalia. Becoming fond of Orpheus, Apollo gave him a little golden lyre and taught him to play it. Orpheus's mother taught him to write verses for singing.

As the Oracle of Delphi was sacred to the god Apollo, so did the mountain itself become associated with Apollo. According to some traditions, Parnassus was the site of the water deity Castalia and her spring, as well as the home of the Muses; according to other traditions, however, that honor fell to Mount Helicon, another mountain in the same range. As the home of the Muses, Parnassus was considered the home of poetry, music, and learning.

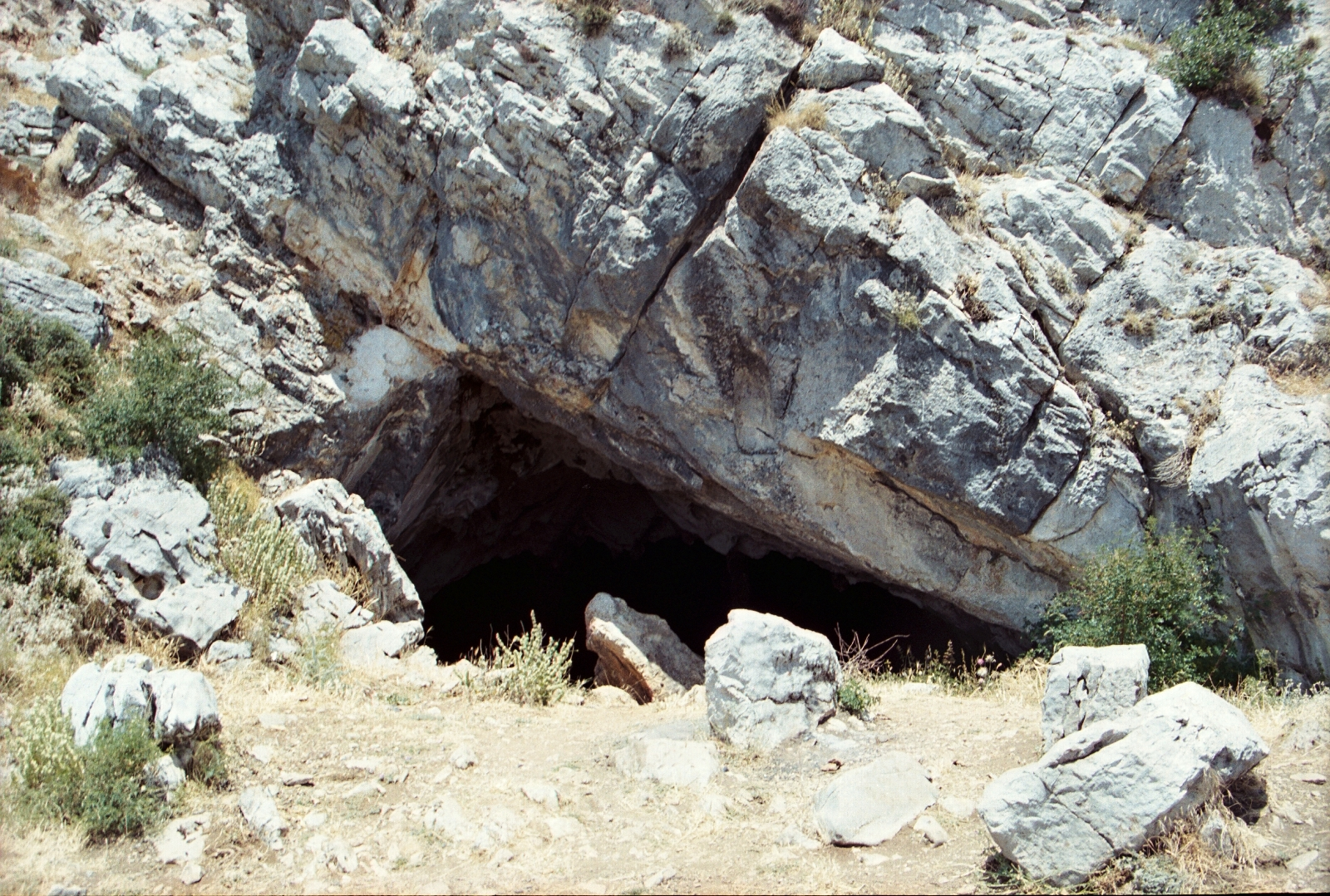
Entrance to the Corycian Cave

Parnassus was also the site of several unrelated minor events in Greek mythology.

- In some versions of the Greek flood myth, the ark of Deucalion comes to rest on the slopes of Parnassus. This is the version of the myth recounted in Ovid's Metamorphoses.
- Orestes spent time in hiding on Mount Parnassus.
- Parnassus was sacred to the god Dionysus.
- The Corycian Cave, located on the slopes of Parnassus, was associated with Hermes and the Bee Maidens (Thriae) nymphs. It was later sacred to Pan and to the Muses.
- In Book 19 of The Odyssey, Odysseus recounts a story of how he was gored in the thigh during a boar hunt on Mount Parnassus in his youth.

Parnassus was also the home of Pegasus, the winged horse of Bellerophon.

== As metaphor ==
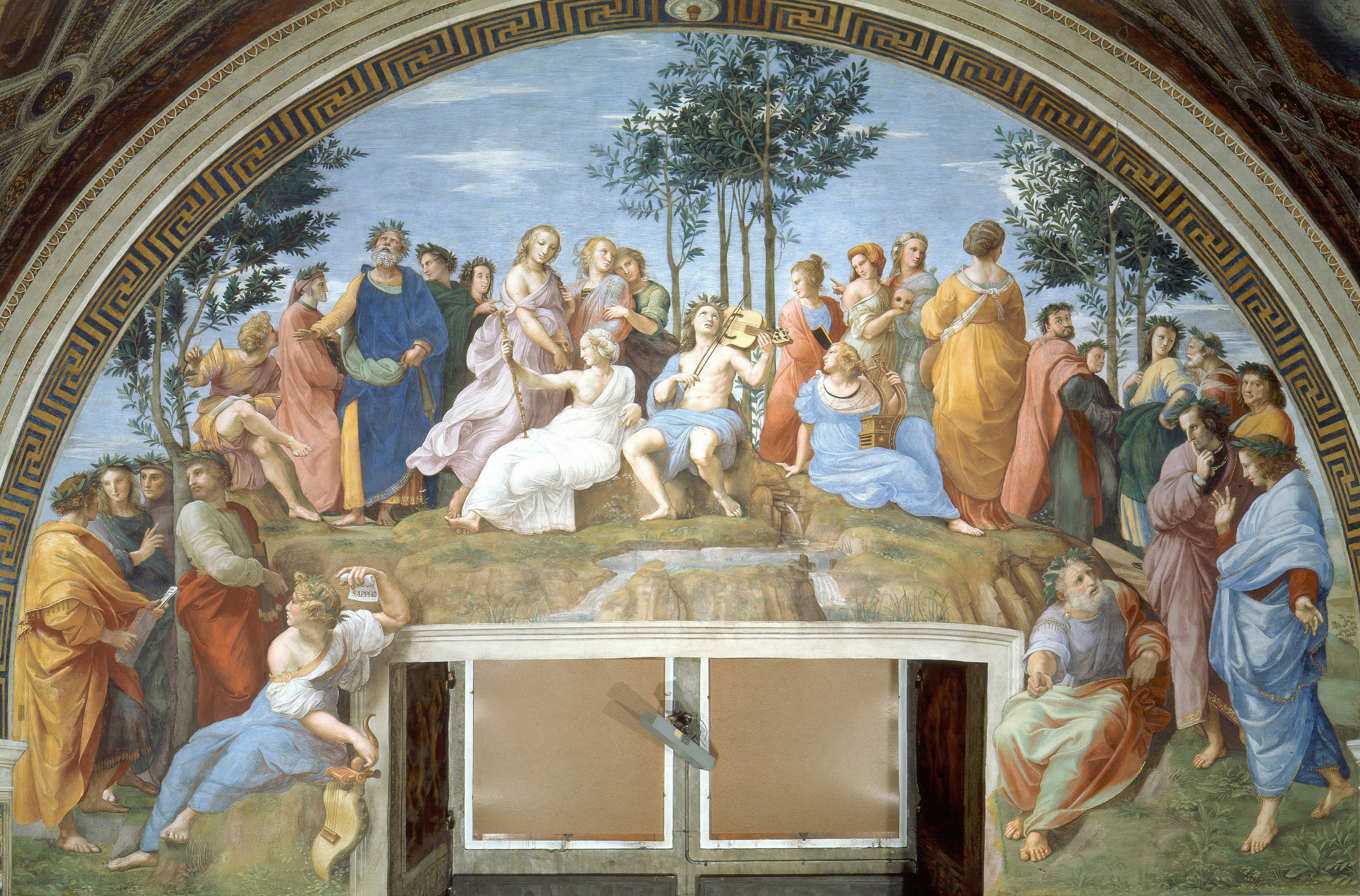
The Parnassus, c. 1509-1511, by Raphael

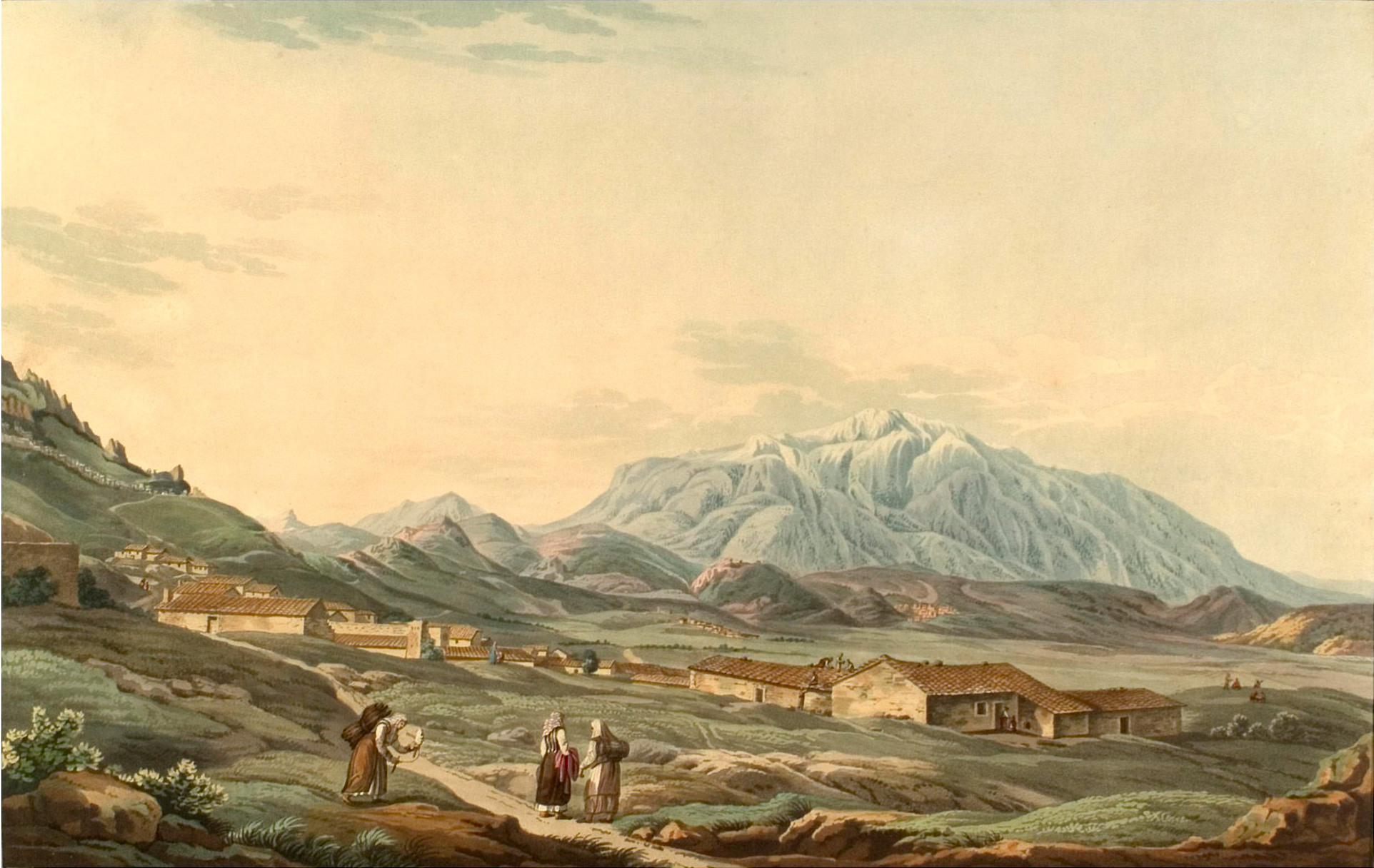
Painting of Mount Parnassus from Edward Dodwell's Views in Greece, 1821

This relation of the mountain to the Muses offered an instigation for its "mystification" by the poetic-artistic Parnassism movement, established in France in the decade of 1866 to 1876 as a reaction to Romanticism. Parnassism was characterized by a return to some classicistic elements and belief in the doctrine of "Art for the Art", first articulated by Theophile Gautier. The periodical Modern Parnassus, issued by Catul Mendes and Xavier Ricard, contained direct references to Mt. Parnassus and its mythological feature as habitation of the Muses. The Parnassists, who did not exceed a group of twenty poets, exercised a relatively strong influence on the cultural life of Paris, particularly due to their tenacity in the perfection of rhyme and vocabulary. Parnassism influenced several French poets, but it also exercised an influence on modern Greek poets, particularly Kostis Palamas and Ioannis Gryparis.

The name of the mountain (Mont Parnasse) was given to a quarter of Paris on the left bank of the Seine, where artists and poets used to gather and recite their poems in public. Montparnasse is nowadays one of the most renowned quarters of the city, and in its cemetery, many personalities of the arts and culture are buried.

Parnassus figures earlier in Jonathan Swift's The Battle of the Books (1697) as the site of an ideological war between the ancients and the moderns.

== Recreational use ==
=== National Park ===
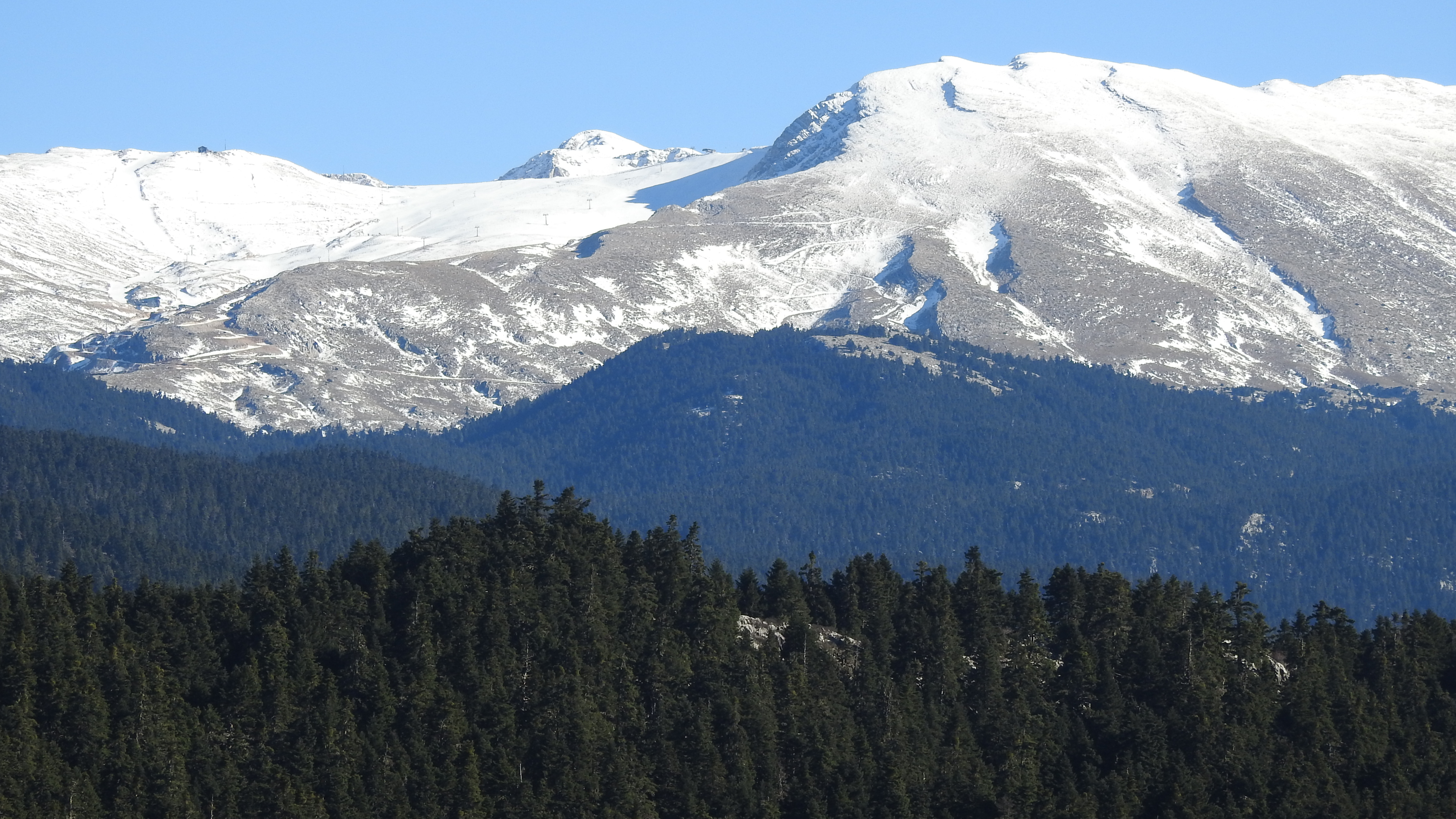
Viewpoint of the national park and Liakoura peak

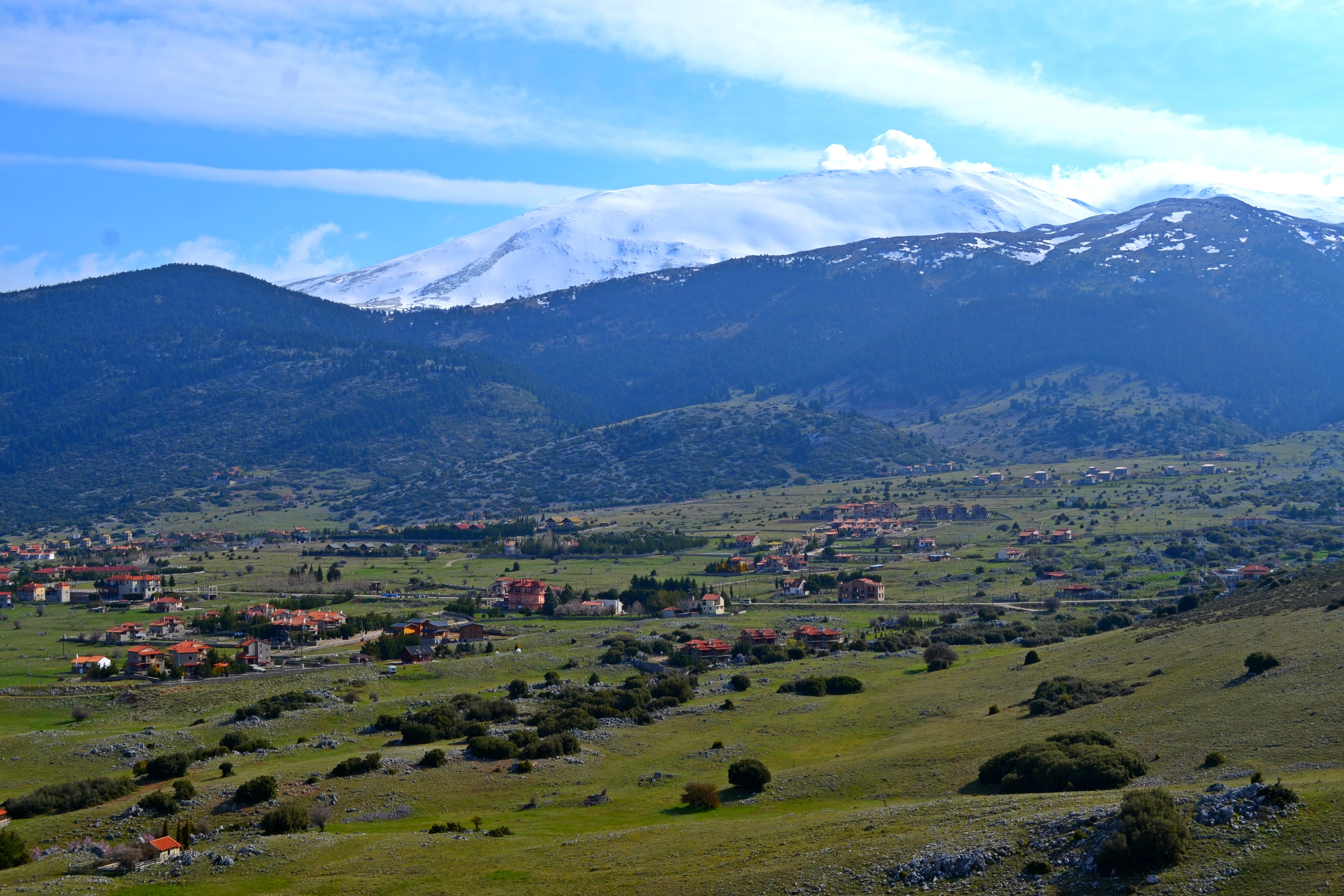
Livadi plateau

The National Park of Parnassus was founded in 1938, conceived in order to preserve the natural habitat, for which it was necessary to govern the disposition of its natural resources. However, the park did not include all the terrain considered to be in the range and the highest peaks were omitted.

Within a few years the park aspect of the land became dormant as the mountain served as a haven of partisans fighting the Axis occupation, and then after World War II, as a theater of the Greek Civil War. The mountain, with its deep forests, rocky terrain and connection to the much larger Pindus mountain range, was in a unique position to serve as a center of resistance, as it had for the Greek war of independence, and battles were fought in the valleys surrounding the range.

When the conflicts were over and the region went back to being an active park, ecology brought changes to the park administration. Species were inventoried, endemic and endangered ones were identified, and the concept of a protected area was established. Parnassus National Park became a protected area for birds under the "Birds Directive." Subsequently, it acquired other protections under other laws as required by the EU. After 2000, it became Oros Parnassos, "Mount Parnassus," Natura 2000 protected area ID GR2410002. The two are not exactly identical. The national park is about 150 km^{2} (37,000 acres). The Natura 2000 area is about 344 km^{2} (85,000 acres), bringing the terrain not covered by the park under protection.

Among the endemic flora species under protection are the Cephalonian fir tree and the Parnassian peony (Paeonia parnassica). In the Park are to be found birds of prey, wolves, boars, badgers, and weasels.

=== Parnassos Ski Resort ===
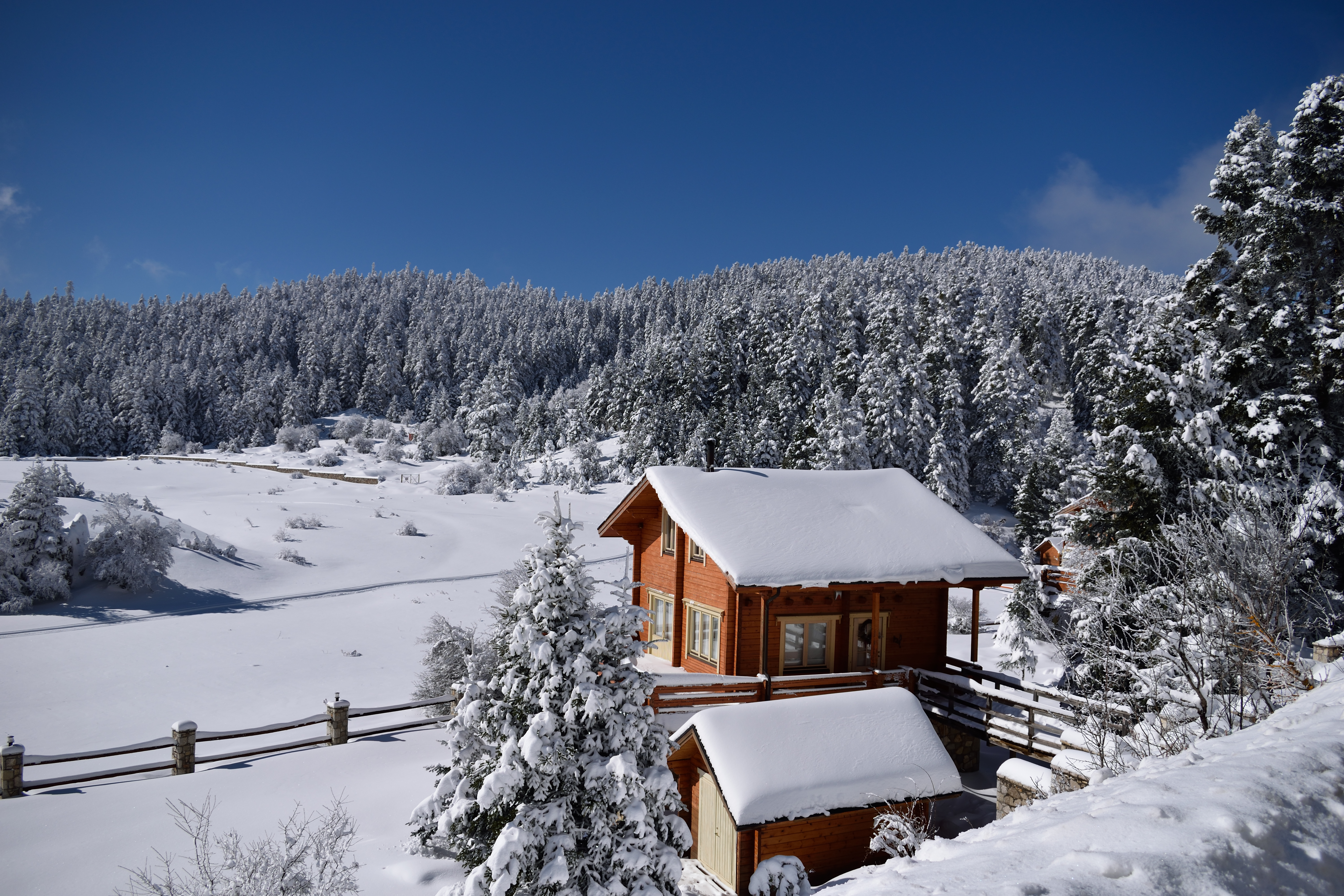
View of the resort

The slopes of Mount Parnassus are composed of two ski sections, Kellaria and Fterolakka, which together make up the largest ski center in Greece. A smaller ski center (only two drag lifts) called Gerontovrahos is across a ridge from Kellaria. Parnassus is mined for its abundant supply of bauxite which is converted to aluminium oxide and then to aluminium.

The construction of the ski resort started in 1975 and was completed in 1976, when the first two drag lifts operated in Fterolaka. In 1981 the construction of a new ski area was completed in Kelaria, while in winter season 1987–1988 the chair lift Hermes started operating and connected the two ski areas. Both ski resorts continued expanding, and in 1993, the first high-speed quad in Greece was installed, named Hercules. In 2014–2015, two new hybrid lifts were installed along with a new eight-seater, replacing the old infrastructure.

Today, the Ski Center operates with 16 lifts, two hybrid ski lifts that combine an eight-seater Cabin and a six-seater chair, an eight-seater Cabin, a 4-seater chair lift, a 2-seater chair lift, six drag lifts, and four baby lifts. The ski center boasts 25 marked ski runs and about 15 ski routes of 36 km (22 mi) total length, while the longest run is 4 km (2 mi).

== See also ==
- List of mountains in Greece
