= Forty-Nine Martyrs =

There are several groups of Forty-Nine Martyrs venerated as saints in Christianity:

- Martyrs of Abitinae (304), Roman Catholic
- Forty-nine companions of Callistratus of Carthage (303×313), Roman Catholic and Eastern Orthodox
- Forty-Nine Martyrs of Scetis (444), Oriental Orthodox
- Sadok and 48 Dominican martyrs from Sandomierz (1260), Roman Catholic
