= Poems in Prose =

Poems in Prose may refer to:

- Poems in Prose (Turgenev), the cycle of 83 prose Poems by Ivan Turgenev written in 1877—1882
- Poems in Prose (Wilde), the collective title of six prose poems published by Oscar Wilde in 1894
- Poems in Prose (Smith), an illustrated collection of prose poems by Clark Ashton Smith from 1965
