= Kalistratov =

Kalistratov Kalistratova from Kalistrat

- Alina Kalistratova
- Konstantin Kalistratov
- Sofiya Kalistratova
- Timofey Kalistratov
- Meletiy Kalistratov or {Meletijs Kaļistratovs Russian Old Believer, Latvian public figure and politician
