= Narcissus (after Boltraffio) =

Painting by a follower of Giovanni Antonio Boltraffio

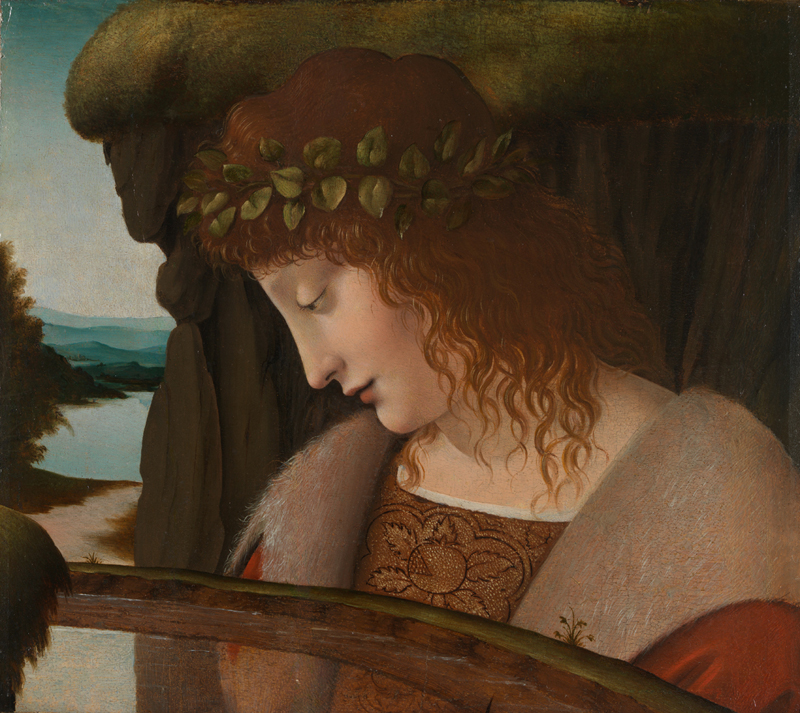
Narcissus (c. 1500)

Narcissus is a c. 1500 painting of Narcissus by a follower of Giovanni Antonio Boltraffio, Leonardo da Vinci's collaborator in Milan. It is now in the National Gallery, London. It is a copy after Narcissus at the Fountain, an autograph work by Boltraffio now in the Uffizi. Unusually it shows the subject in modern dress and with a pile rather than the more usual pond or fountain, probably a pentimento
