= Narcissus at the Fountain =

Painting by Giovanni Antonio Boltraffio

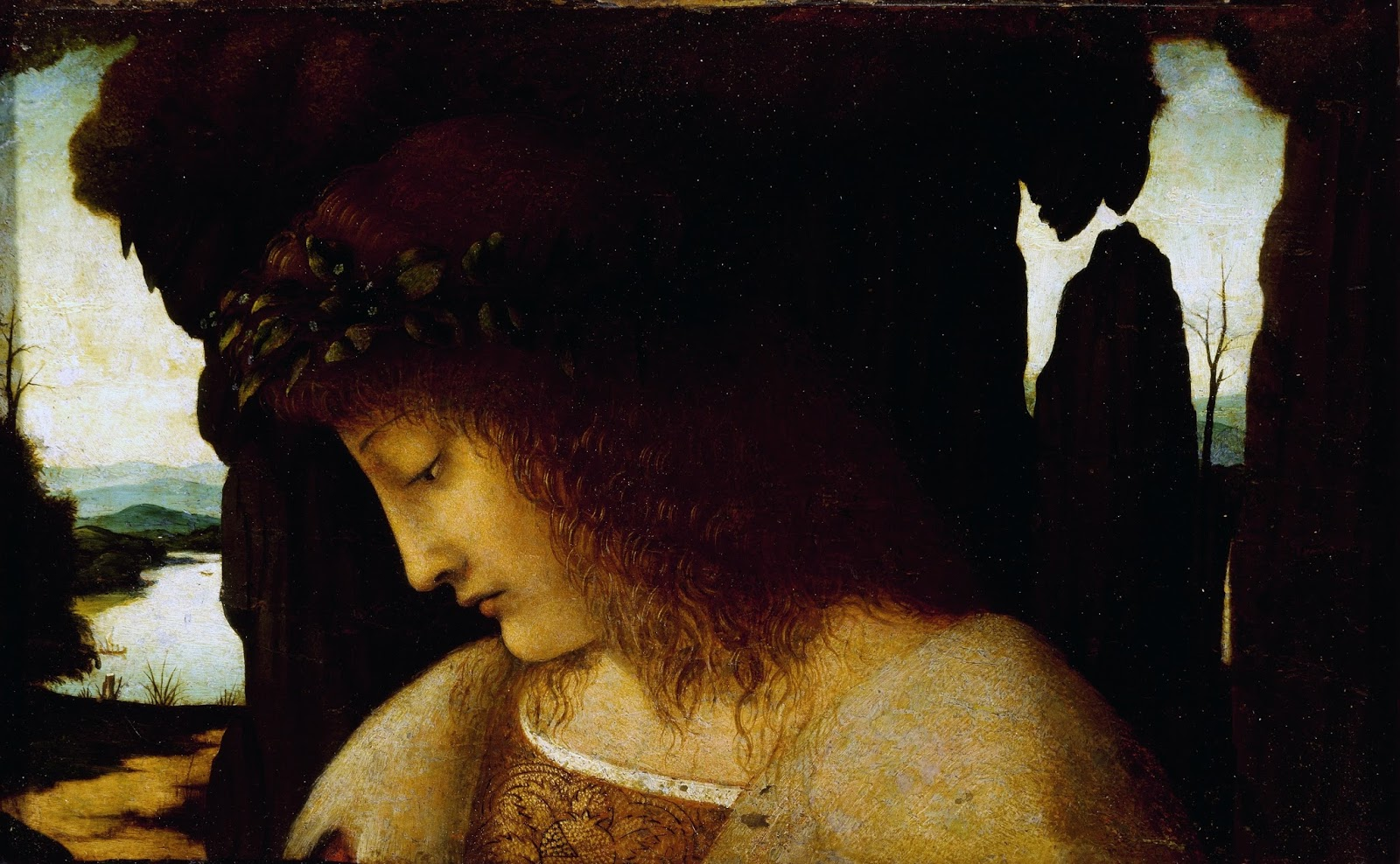
Narcissus at the Fountain (1500-1510) by Giovanni Antonio Boltraffio

Narcissus at the Fountain is a 1500–1510 oil-on-panel painting by Giovanni Antonio Boltraffio, now in the Uffizi, in Florence. A copy is held in the National Gallery, London. Both works show a young man in profile, interpreted as Narcissus due to his downward gaze.

Strongly influenced by Leonardo da Vinci, particularly in the background, reminiscent of the Virgin of the Rocks), the work has several elements in common with other colleagues of Boltraffio such as Bernardino Luini and Andrea Solario, which in the past has caused attribution difficulties.
