= Liriope (mythology) =

Greek mythology

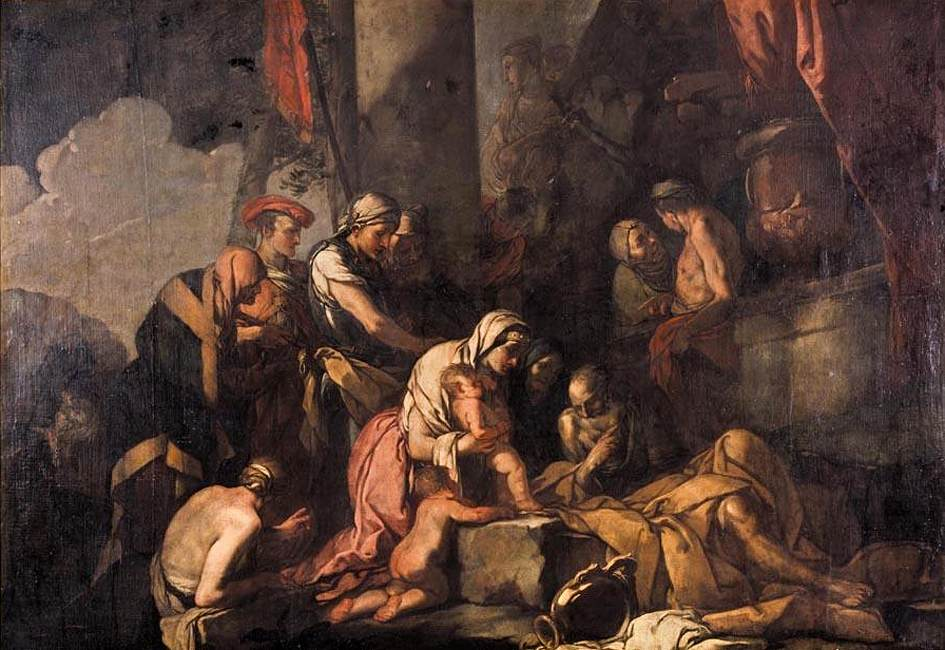
Giulio Carpioni's Liriope Bringing Narcissus before Tiresias (1660s)

In Greek mythology, Liriope (Ancient Greek: Λιριόπη, romanized: Liriopē) or Leiriope (Ancient Greek: Λειριόπη, romanized: Leiriopē) was a 'dusky' Boeotian naiad of Thespiae.

== Etymology ==
Liriope's name means "face of the narcissus" from the Greek words leirion "narcissus" and ops "face." Her son was also named for the flower—narkissos in Greek. Leiron and narkissos might be the same plant or could represent two different species of daffodil.

== Family ==
Liriope was probably the daughter of one of the Boeotian or Phocian river gods. She was raped by the river god Cephissus, who was himself the son of Pontus and Thalassa, and bore his son Narcissus.

== Mythology ==
Liriope consulted the blind seer Tiresias about her son's future. He told her Narcissus would live a long life only "if he does not come to know himself"—a prophecy later fulfilled when Narcissus fell fatally in love with his own reflection.
