= Callistratus =

Callistratus or Kallistratos is a given name of Greek origin (Greek: Καλλίστρατος). It may refer to:

- Callistratus of Aphidnae (died c. 350 BC), Athenian politician of the 4th century BC
- Callistratus (grammarian), Alexandrian writer of the 2nd century BC
- Callistratus (jurist), Roman legal writer active in the 3rd century AD
- Callistratus (sophist), Greek writer of the 3rd or 4th century AD
- Callistratus, an Athenian poet, known only as the author of a drinking song in honor of Harmodius and Aristogeiton (c. 500 BC)
- Callistratus, producer of some of Aristophanes' plays and his sometime collaborator
- Domitius Callistratus, a historian of perhaps the 1st century BC, author of local histories of Heraclea Pontica and Samothrace
- Callistratus of Carthage, a Christian saint who is said to have inspired forty-nine soldiers to martyrdom in Carthage in the 4th century
- Callistratus of Georgia (1866–1952), catholicos-patriarch of All Georgia from 1932

== See also ==
- Callistratus, previous name of a Canadian research vessel, later renamed CCGS W. E. Ricker
- Callistratus, the diabolical scientific vampire doctor character in the film Blood of the Vampire
- Kalistrat
