= Kalistrat =

Kalistrat Kallistrat is a masculine given name derived from Greek (Greek: Καλλίστρατος), similar to Callistratus. It gave rise to the Kalistratov.

Notable people with the name include:

- Kalistrat Zografski, 19th-century Orthodox Christian composer, chanter, educator, Bulgarian abbot and archimandrite
- Kalistrat Salia (1901–1986), Georgian émigré historian and philologist active in France
