= Xenokrateia Relief =

5th-century BC Greek relief

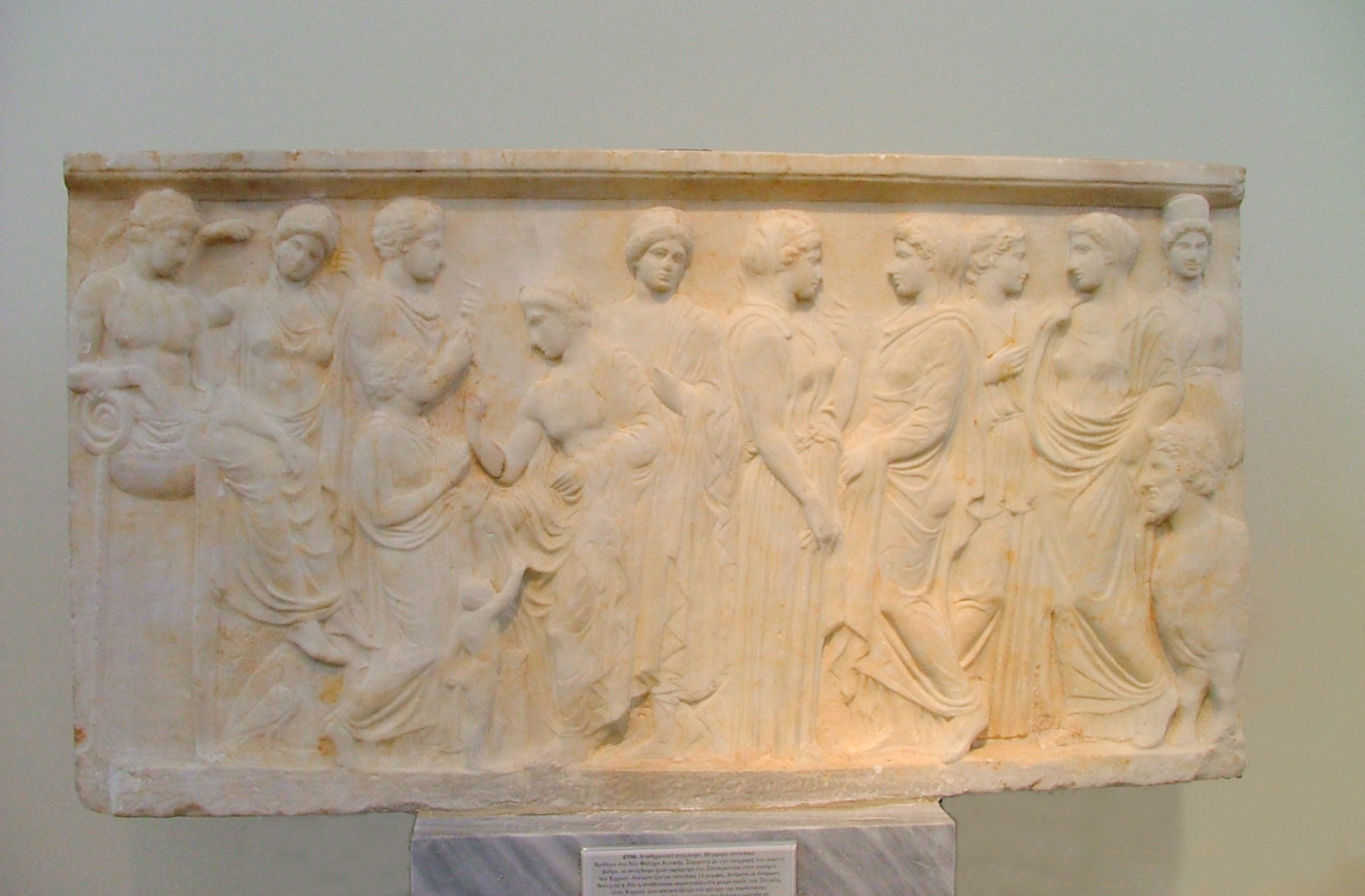
The Xenokrateia Relief

The Xenokrateia Relief is a marble votive offering, dated to the end of the fifth-century BCE. It commemorates the foundation of a sanctuary to the river god Kephisos by a woman named Xenokrateia.

The relief, currently on display at the National Archaeological Museum in Athens (NAMA 2756), was found in Neo Phaliro in 1908, in the area inside the Long Walls, which in Antiquity connected the harbor of Piraeus with Athens proper, around the walls’ intersection point with the bed of the Kephisos river. It is dated on stylistic grounds to 410 BCE, and is made of Pentelic marble, while the pillar on which it stands is made of limestone.

The relief marks the foundation of a local sanctuary to the river god Kephisos. We have no knowledge of this sanctuary from literary sources, or any indication of archaeological structure in the area where the relief was discovered. This has led some scholars to propose that the sanctuary consisted of only a sacred grove and an altar. Thus, the only information we have comes from this relief and its inscription, as well as from two other finds excavated nearby – the Kephisodotos relief and an inscribed stele.

== The Inscription ==
Original Greek text (IG II² 4548)

Ξενοκράτεια Κηφισο̑ ἱερ-

ὸν ἱδρύσατο καὶ ἀνέθηκεν

ξυνβώμοις τε θεοῖς διδασκαλ-

ίας τόδε δῶρον, Ξενιάδο θυγάτ-

ηρ καὶ μήτηρ ἐκ Χολλειδῶν,

θύεν τῶι βουλομένωι ἐπὶ

τελεστῶν ἀγαθῶν.

English translation

Xenokrateia to Kephisos a sanctuary

has founded and dedicated [it]

to [him] and to the gods who share this altar

in thanks for ta didaskalia, the daughter

and the mother of Xeniades of Choleidai,

whoever wishes, is permitted to sacrifice for

the fulfillment of good things

This inscription has generated many – and sometimes contradicting – interpretations. First, there is some disagreement regarding Xenokrateia's familial status. Most scholars agree that both her father and son were named Xeniades, and that her husband is not mentioned in the inscription. Mclees thinks she was a widow or maybe that she was not legally married, Kron believes she was an heiress who did not need a guardian, and Purvis suggests that Xenokrateia was married to Kephisodotos, who dedicated the other relief mentioned earlier. Cook, however, claims Xenokrateia was the wife of Xeniades, and that she dedicated the relief “as daughter (before her marriage) and mother (after it).”

In addition, scholars are divided in their opinions on how to translate ta didaskalia and to what it refers, since no other information is given for the reason behind the dedication. This phrase is usually translated as “instructions,” “teachings,” “upbringing,” or “training.” One of the interpretations suggests that the relief was given in thanks for the education of Xenokrateia's son. Yet it was also claimed that since dedications are given to the gods only after they fulfill what was asked of them, Xenokrateia is thanking the god for her own education which she now uses in order to educate her son. Other suggestions are that this is an act in which Xenokrateia places her son under the protection of Kephisos, or that it was given in thanks after her son won a singing competition.

== The relief ==
The main problem regarding this relief is the identification of the thirteen figures portrayed on it. Unfortunately, most of the figures lack attributes, thus they cannot be identified with certainty, and scholars vary in their opinions in this regard, since such little secure evidence leaves a great room for hypothesis and guesswork. For example, while it is clear that the third figure from the left is holding an object, it is unclear what it is. It was identified as a kerykeion, meaning the figure is Hermes, as a loom, claiming that this is Rhapso, one of the Moirai, who weave the destinies of men, and as a torch held by Artemis. The attributes of the figures on the relief must have been painted on rather than carved, since otherwise they would make less sense to the visitors of the sanctuary. Most scholars assume that the two figures in the smaller scale are Xenokrateia and her son, and that she is introducing him to Kephisos, so that the god may oversee the boy's growth to adulthood.

=== The Inscribed Stele ===
In order to decipher the composition of the Xenokrateia Relief and to identify the figures portrayed on it, scholars use the two other finds from the site. The first is an inscribed stele with names of some divinities in the dative case, and it is understood by some as the sacrificial regulation of the sanctuary. However, since there is no mention of a cult, a sacrifice, or any instructions, others consider this stele as another votive offering. The names inscribed upon the stele are Hestia, Kephisos, Apollo Pythios, Leto, Artemis Lochia (of birth), Eileithyia, Acheloos, Kallirohe, the Geraistian nymphs of birth, and Rhapso. This is an interesting list, as most of these deities were perceived as nurturing and protecting children. Unfortunately, this list cannot represent the gods in our relief, since while the relief depicts five gods and six goddesses, the stele names three gods and nine goddesses, assuming that there are three Geraistian nymphs, since nymphs are usually depicted in groups of three in Athenian art. However, some of the deities named on the stele might also appear on our relief.

=== The Kephisodotos Relief ===
Next is the double relief of Kephisodotos, also dated to 410 BCE. On one side it depicts the hero Acheloos, kidnapping a nymph whose name is inscribed as Iasila, while Hermes is leading the chariot. On the other side, Kephisos, depicted as a horned god, stands in the middle. On the right are three nymphs and on the left appear two other unidentified figures. The inscription says it is a dedication to Hermes and the nymphs, thus demonstrating that there were even more divinities associated with this sanctuary.

=== The Imagery ===
The one certain identification on the Xenokrateia relief is the figure on the far left. This is the god Apollo, sitting on a tripod, resting his legs on an Omphalos, near to which stands an eagle. The figure to his right is usually identified as Apollo's mother, Leto, or as his sister, Artemis. Some scholars identify Artemis as the third figure from the left, while others identify it as Hermes, Leto, Rhapso, or an unidentified youth. The two figures of a smaller scale are almost unanimously identified as Xenokrateia and her son, Xeniades, since Greek art usually depict humans as smaller than deities. The figure who interacts with Xenokrateia and her son is usually identified as either Kephisos or merely a priest.

There is a great uncertainty regarding the next five figures, and there are many possible identifications for them, namely Hestia, Eileithyia, Leto, Rhapso, nymphs or river-gods such as Kephisos or Ilisos. Finally, of the two figures on the far right, the one on the top is understood to be Kallirhoe or a statue of hers, although some suggest it is Eileithyia or Hecate, and the bull-like deity on the bottom, is identified as the river-god Acheloos by almost all scholars.

Thus, most of the suggestions identify Xenokrateia and her son in this relief and attempt to match to them the relevant deities. However, there is one interpretation that deviates from this line of thought. Stais claims that this relief depicts the mythological participants of the Athenian myth of Ion, in which the Athenian princess Creusa was raped by Apollo and gave birth to his son, Ion, whom she exposed to the elements. He was rescued by Apollo, however, and guided to Delphi by Hermes. Years later, when Creusa arrived to Delphi with her husband, Xuthos, to ask why they cannot have children, she is reunited with her son. Following this myth, Stais identified the first three figures as Apollo, his mother, Leto, and his sister, Artemis, while recognizing the next five figures as the participants of this myth: the Pythia, who was Apollo's priestess, Ion, Xuthus, Hermes, and Creusa. Next he identifies three nymphs and Eileithyia. Finally he believes that the bull-like deity is Kephisos, thus connecting the myth of Ion to the locality of the sanctuary.

== References and sources ==
Sources

- Anti, C. “Appunti di esegesi figurate.” in Atti dell’Instituto Veneto di Scienze. 1923-1924, vol. LXXXIII, no. 2. pp. 567–584.
- Beschi, L. “Culti stranieri e fondazioni private nell'Attica classica: alcuni casi.” in Annuario della Scuola Archeologica di Atene e delle Missioni Italiane in Oriente. 2002, vol. LXXX, III.2. pp. 13–42.
- Βουτυράς, Ε. “Φροντίσματα: Το ανάγλυφο της Ξενοκράτειας και το ιερό του Κηφισού στο Νέο Φάληρο.” εν Δεληβορριάς Ά., Δεσπίνης, Γ. και Ζαρκάδας Ά. Έπαινος Luigi Beschi. Αθήνα, 2011. pp. 49–58.
- Cook, A.B. Zeus. A Study in Ancient Religion. New York, 1964.
- Dillon, M. Girls and Women in Classical Religion. London, 2002.
- Δραγουμης, Σ.Ν. “Αρχαιολογικά φροντίσματα.” Αρχαιολογική Εφημερίς. 1911. pp. 214–222.
- Edwards, C.M. Greek Votive Reliefs to Pan and the Nymphs. PhD Dissertation. NYU, 1985.
- Guarducci, M. “Le iscrizioni del santuario di Cefiso presso il Falero.” in Annuario della Scuola Archeologica di Atene e delle Missioni Italiane in Oriente. 1949-1951, vol. XI-XIII. pp. 117–133.
- Guarducci, M. “L'offerta di Xenokrateia nel sanctuario di Cefiso al Falero.” in Bradeen D. W., and McGregor M. F. (eds.). Φόρος: Tribute to Benjamin Dean Meritt. New York, 1974. pp. 57–66.
- Hausmann, U. Griechischen Weihreliefs. Berlin, 1960.
- Homolle, Th. Sur trois bas-reliefs de Phalère. Paris, 1920.
- Kaltsas, N. Sculpture in the National Archaeological Museum, Athens. Los Angeles, 2002.
- Kron, Uta. “Priesthoods, Dedication, and Euergetism.” in Hellstrom, P. and Alroth, B. (eds.). Religion and Power in the Ancient Greek World. Uppsala, 1993. pp. 139–182.
- Larson, J.L. Greek Nymphs: Myth, Cult, Lore. Oxford, 2001.
- Lawton, C.L. “Children in Classical Attic Votive Reliefs.” in Cohen, Ada, and Rutter, Jeremy B. Constructions of Childhood in Ancient Greece and Italy. Princeton, 2007. pp. 41–60.
- Linfert, A. “Die Deutung des Xenokrateiareliefs.” in Mitteilungen Athenische. 1967, vol. LXXXII, pp. 149–157.
- McClees, H. A study of women in Attic inscriptions. New York, 1920.
- Palagia, O. Art in Athens During the Peloponnesian War. Cambridge, 2009.
- Papaspyridi, S. Guide du Musée National. Marbres, bronzes et vases. Atene, 1927.
- Parker, R. Polytheism and Society at Athens. Oxford, 2005.
- Purvis, A. Singular Dedications. New York, 2003.
- Σταης, Β. “Άναθηματιχον άνάγλυφον έκ Φαλήρου.” Αρχαιολογική Εφημερίς. 1909. pp. 239–264.
- van Straten, F. “Gifts for the Gods.” in Versnel, H.S. Faith, Hope, and Worship. Leiden, 1981. pp. 65–151.
- van Straten, F. “Votives and Votaries in Greek Sanctuaries.” in Schachter, Albert [et al.]. Le Sanctuaire Grec. Genèva, 1992. pp. 247–284.
- Svoronos, J .N. Das Athener Nationalmuseum. Atene, 1908- 1911.
- Walter, O. “Die Reliefs aus dem Heiligtum der Echeliden in Neu Phaleron.” in Ephemeris Archaiologike. 1937, vol. l, pp. 97–119.
