= Cephissus (mythology) =

River gods in Greek mythology

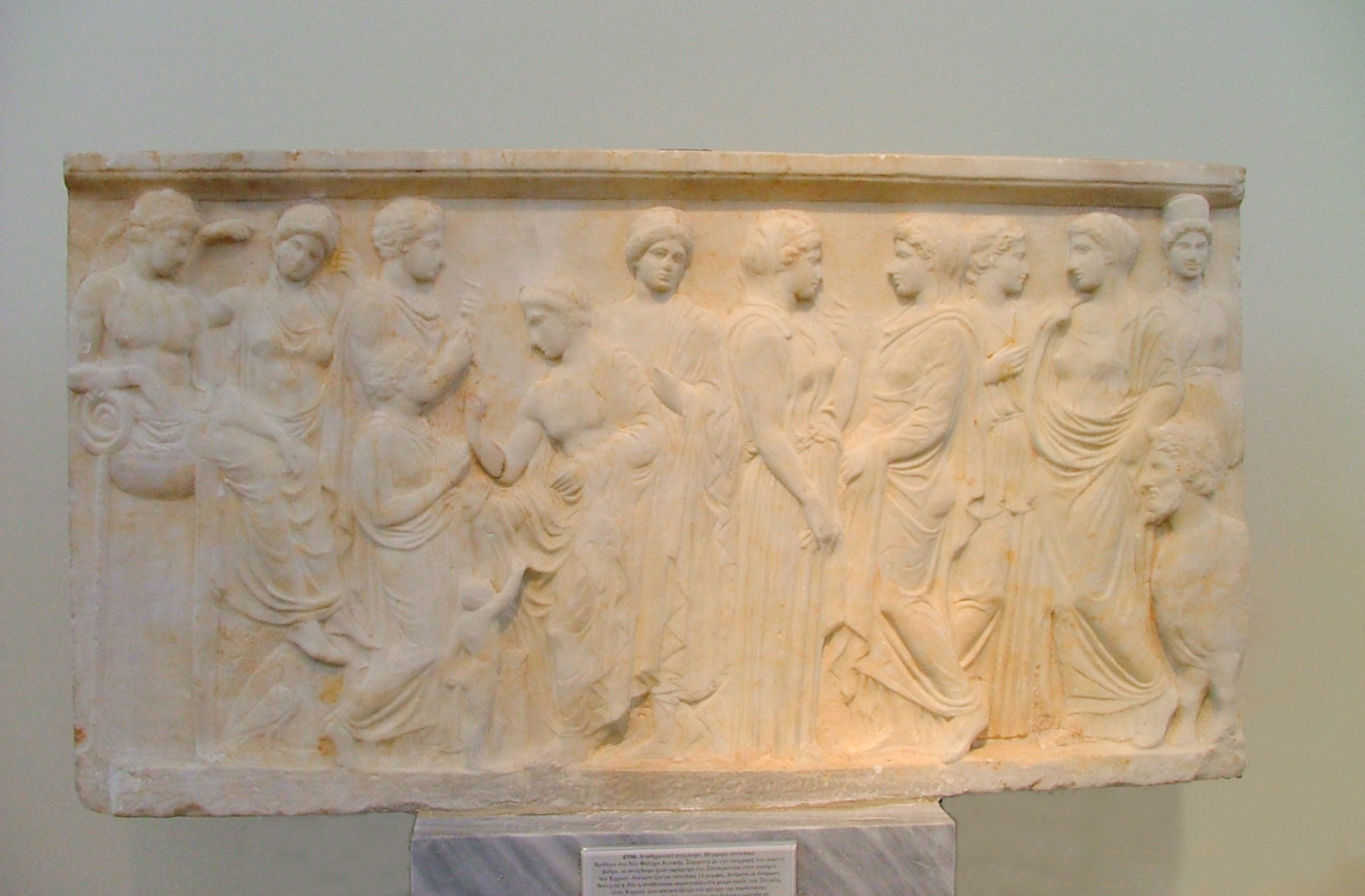
The Xenokrateia Relief, from the late fifth century BC, commemorates the founding of a sanctuary to Cephissus, National Archaeological Museum of Athens.

In Greek mythology Cephissus also spelled Kephissos (/ˈkɛfɪˌsəs/ or /ˌkɪfɪˈsoʊs/; Ancient Greek: Κηφισός, romanized: Kephisos) is a river god of ancient Greece, associated with the river Cephissus in Attica and/or with the river Cephissus in Boeotia, both in Greece.

== Family ==
Cephissus was a son of Pontus and Thalassa.

The daughters of Cephissus were:

1. the naiad Lilaea, the eponym of Lilaea,
2. Daulis, the eponym of the city of Daulis and
3. Melaeno mother of Delphus by Apollo, though he also gives two other accounts of Delphus' mother.

However, one of these alternate versions is that Thyia, a daughter of the aboriginal Castalius, was Delphus' mother, almost certainly the same Thyia whom Herodotus claims was a daughter of Cephissus to whom the Delphians built an altar to the winds and who was eponym of the Thyiades.

A mortal son of Cephissus was Eteocles by Euippe, daughter of Leucon, son of Athamas. This Euippe later became the wife of King Andreus of Orchomenus and Eteocles inherited Andreus' throne. Eteocles or Eteoclus, son of Cephissus, was confirmed from Hesiod's and Pindar's accounts. He was the first to make offering to the Charites by the side of the river Cephissus.

Cephissus was also said to be the father of Narcissus by the naiad Liriope. Another son, Euonymus, who gave his name to Euonymeia, was the father of Aulis, the eponym of Aulis.

== Mythology ==
This Cephissus may also be the Argive river-god of the same name who together with two other river-gods, Inachus and Asterion, judged that the land of Argolis belonged to Hera instead of Poseidon. Thus, the sea god made their waters disappear and for this reason neither of the three rivers provide water to the land except after rain. In an obscure myth, Cephissus greatly lamented his grandson being turned into a seal by Apollo.
