= Narcissus (mythology) =

Character in Greek mythology

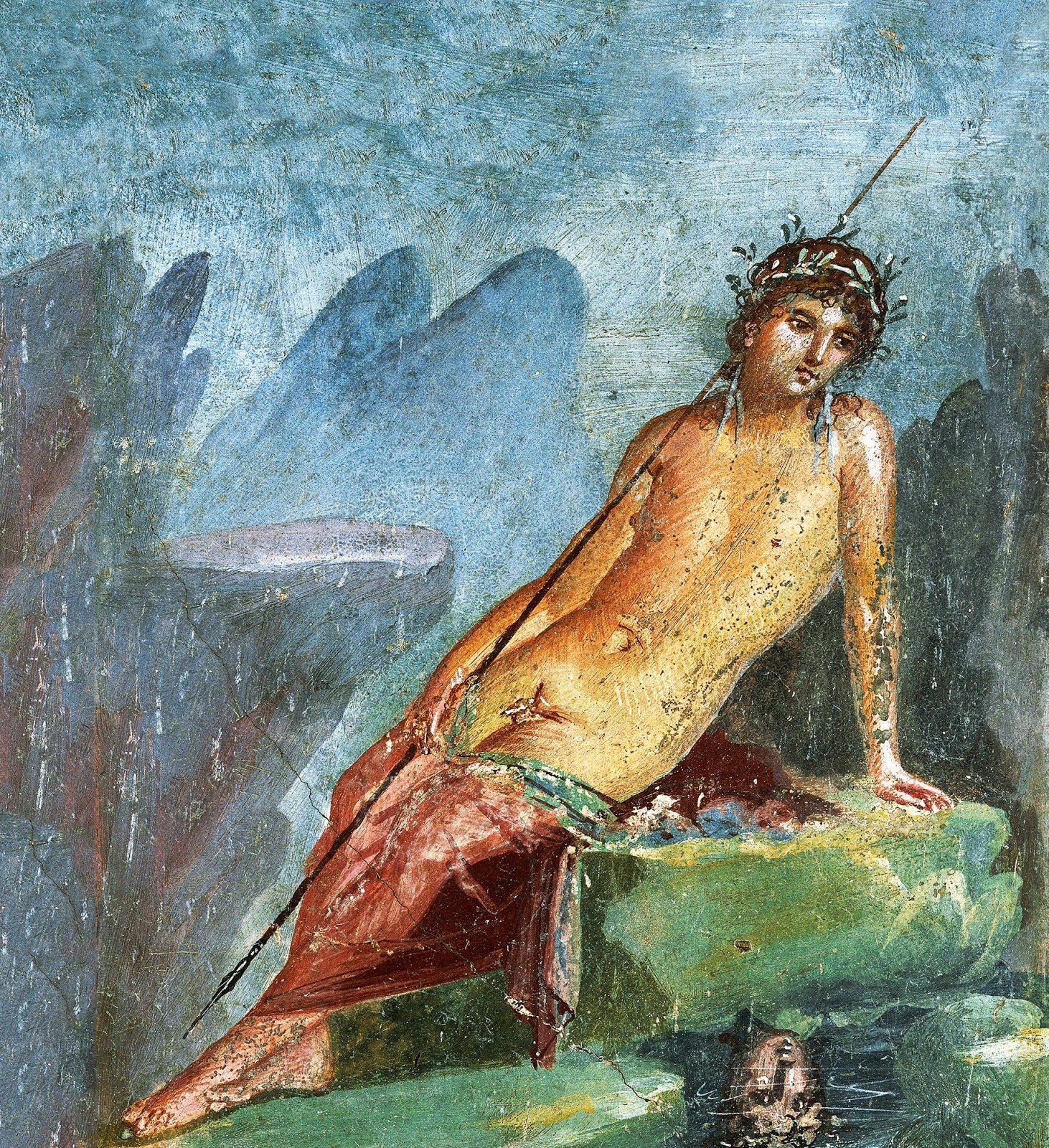
Narcissus, fresco from the House of M. Lucretius Fronto at Pompeii.

In Greek mythology, Narcissus (/nɑːrˈsɪsəs/; Ancient Greek: Νάρκισσος) is a handsome youth who becomes enamoured with his own reflection in a pool of water. In the most famous version of the story, found in Metamorphoses by the Roman poet Ovid (who was active around the beginning of the 1st century AD), Narcissus rejects the advances of numerous suitors, including those of the nymph Echo. By the influence of Nemesis, Narcissus becomes infatuated with his own reflection when he views it in a pool one day. He remains there until he dies, and in that place narcissus flower later arises. Around 50 BC, the myth is attested in one of the Oxyrhynchus papyri. Other versions of the story are told by the 2nd-century AD travel writer Pausanias and the mythographer Conon (who lived around the time of Augustus).

The oldest depictions of Narcissus in ancient art may date to the Roman Empire. Narcissus was a popular subject in Roman art, appearing in nearly 50 Pompeian wall paintings, as well as mosaics, gems, and sarcophagi. His depictions sometimes include other figures, such as Echo or the god Eros.

The mythological figure Narcissus is the origin of the term narcissism.

== Etymology ==
In his Etymological Dictionary of Greek, R. S. P. Beekes says that "the suffix [-ισσος] clearly points to a Pre-Greek word".

== Family ==
In the account by the Roman poet Ovid (active around the beginning of the 1st century AD), Narcissus's parents are the river god Cephissus and the nymph Liriope. In a commentary on Virgil's Eclogues, Narcissus's father is said to be Amarynthus. The 5th-century AD poet Nonnus considers him the son of the Selene, the goddess of the moon, and the mortal Endymion. According to the 12th-century AD Byzantine writer Eustathius, he was born in Thespiai and his mother was named Leirioessa. One of the Vatican Mythographers (dating to the medieval period) states that Alciope was his mother.

== Mythology ==
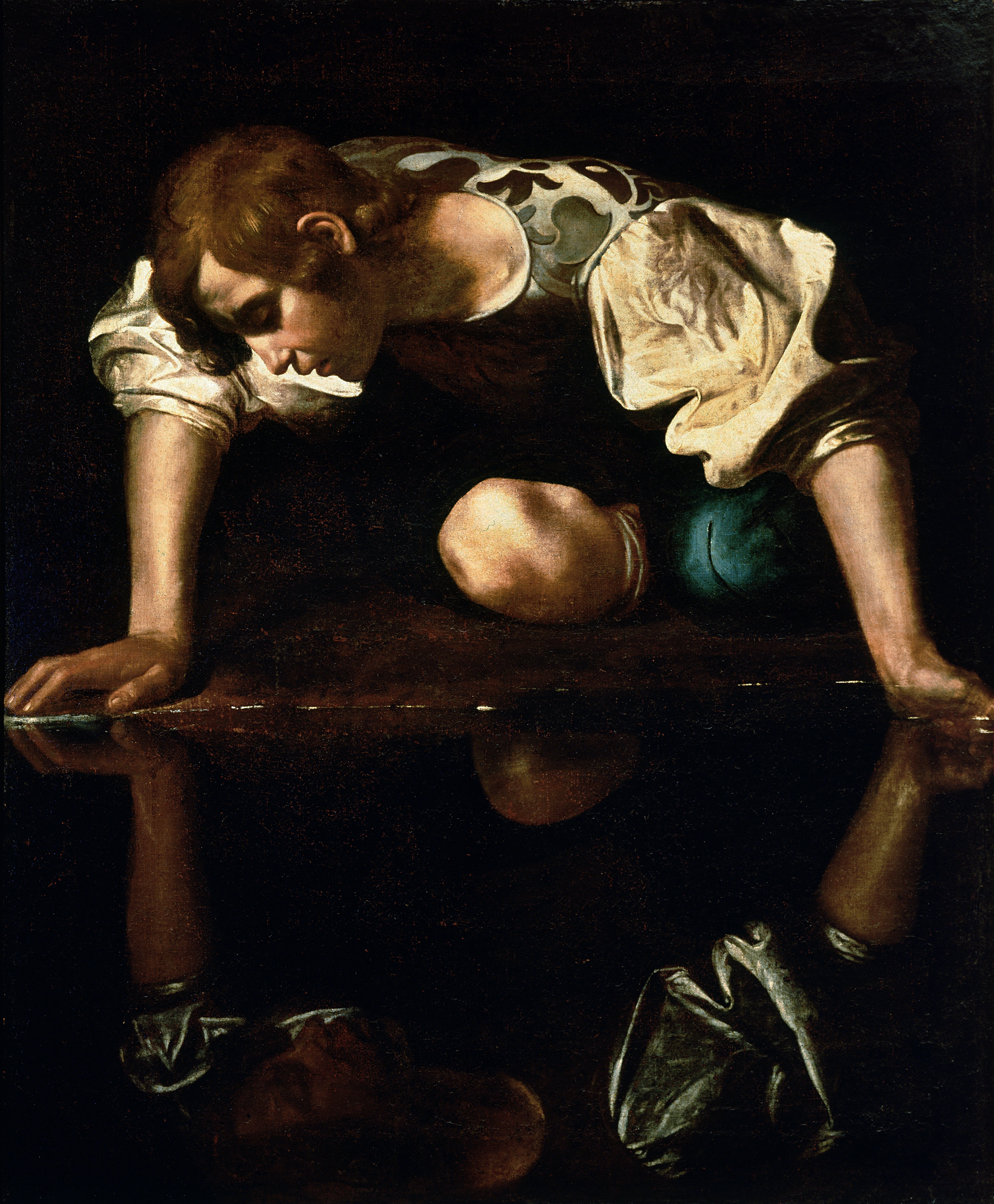
Narcissus, oil painting by Baroque artist Caravaggio.

No mention of Narcissus survives in literary sources from the archaic and the classical period. The lengthiest and most famous version of the myth is that by Ovid, recounted in his Metamorphoses. During the time of the Roman Empire, Narcissus is found in catalogues of the gods' male lovers, alongside figures such as Adonis and Hyacinthus.

=== Papyrus ===
Ovid was probably influenced by an earlier version ascribed to the captive Greek poet Parthenius of Nicaea, composed around 50 BC and rediscovered in 2004 by Dr Benjamin Henry among the Oxyrhynchus papyri at Oxford. This version is very concise and makes no mention of Echo.

He had a cruel heart, and hated all of them, till he conceived a love for his own form: He wailed, seeing his face, delightful as a dream, within a spring; he wept for his beauty. Then the boy shed his blood and gave it to the earth... to bear.

=== Ovid ===
In Ovid's narrative, Narcissus is shown as a newborn to the seer Tiresias, who informs his parents that the infant will live a lengthy life provided he does not look at himself. As a young man, Narcissus attracts the amorous attention of various girls and nymphs, including that of the nymph Echo. He is unmoved by this, causing Echo to isolate herself and gradually cease to exist beyond a voice. Another of his rejected lovers prays to the gods for retribution. Hearing this, the goddess Nemesis ensures that that when Narcissus comes to a body of water, he becomes infatuated with his reflection. Uninterested in the rest of the world, he eventually perishes in that spot, where a narcissus flower later grows.

The most consequential part of Ovid's version that was presumably absent from the original form of the myth was Echo, whose participation in the story most scholars believe to be an Ovidian invention. Before Ovid's time, Echo is attested in the context of other myths. The representation of her in Ovid's account diverges substantially from traditional portrayals. Through these two characters, Ovid probes the pathology of love, as a melancholic phenomenon in the case of Narcissus and as a maniacal one in that of Echo. Ovid's narrative confers upon each an internal contradiction that precludes their compatibility with the other: Narcissus is a young man who is both the "lover" and the "beloved", but for the Greeks a pederastic relationship presupposes an asymmetry between the two lovers; and Echo sits between being a goddess who rapes a male youth and one who desires but lacks the agency to act upon this lust.

=== Other versions ===
A version of the myth by Conon, a contemporary of Ovid, has an even bloodier ending (Narrations, 24), relating how a young man named Ameinias fell in love with Narcissus, who had already spurned his suitors, all of whom were male. Although Ameinias was very persistent, Narcissus spurned him too and gave him a sword, which Ameinias used to kill himself at Narcissus's doorstep after praying to the gods to teach Narcissus a lesson for all the pain he provoked. Narcissus walked by a pool of water and decided to drink some. He saw his reflection, became entranced by it, his first and only love, and killed himself because he could not have his object of desire. Because of this tragedy, the Thespians came to honor and reverence Eros especially among the gods.

The 2nd-century AD travel writer Pausanias describes two variants of the myth. The first is akin to that found in other sources: Narcissus become besotted with his reflection in a spring and dies. The latter is a rationalised version of the story, in which he develops a love for his twin sister. After her demise, Narcissus views his own image in the spring; he finds beauty in it, owing to its evocation of his sister's beauty. Pausanias writes that he considers the former version fantastical and the latter more credible. He also expresses that he belives the narcissus flower did not derive from Narcissus.

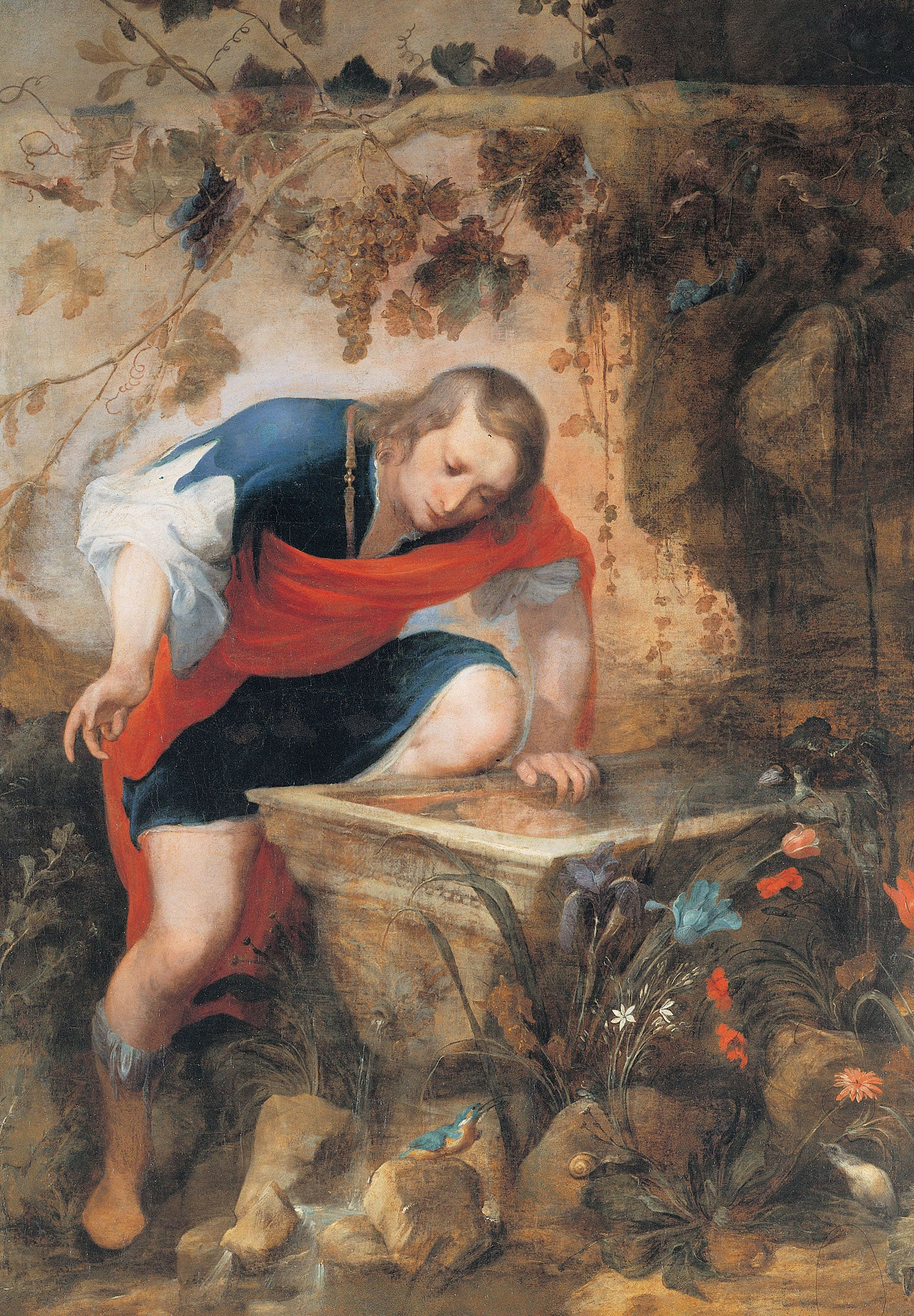
Narcissus at the Spring by Jan Roos depicts Narcissus gazing at his own reflection.

== Iconography ==
With the potential exception of a now-lost Hellenistic statuette from Tanagra, the earliest known depictions of Narcissus originate from the Roman Empire. His story was a popular artistic subject in the Roman world. He appears on almost 50 Pompeian wall paintings, in the fourth Pompeian style. In wall paintings, he is typically situated in a pastoral setting, staring at his visage in the spring whilst sitting in a reclining pose. Eros is sometimes present, and may be seen holding a bow or torch. Certain depictions show him extinguishing this torch, a portent of Narcissus's incoming death. In some paintings Echo also appears, at times wearing a wreath; most paintings that include Echo also contain Eros.

Roman mosaics emphasise Narcissus's status as a hunter: he is sometimes dressed in boots or a petasos, and may be in possession of a sword or spear. Echo is alongside him portrayed in one mosaic wearing a huntress's clothes and holding a spear. On Roman gems (which may date to the 1st century AD), he is shown wearing a mantle, which he is in the process of removing. In some depictions on gems he is in front of a fountain rather than a pool, he holds a branch (which hints at his imminent demise), or the goddess Artemis is shown nearby. His portrayals on Roman sarcophagi (which date to the 2nd and 3rd centuries AD) shown him with his arms above his head, and his garment sitting upon the trunk of a tree.

Two artistic representations of Narcissus are mentioned in literary works: a painting in which he leans against a spear is described by Philostratus, and a marble statue where he holds a syrinx is found in Callistratus. According to Birgitte Rafn, both of these depictions probably did not exist.

== Interpretation ==
According to Jan N. Bremmer, Narcissus's repudiation of lovers would have, for the Greeks, represented an unwillingness to transition into becoming an adult, as homosexual engagements were considered a key part of this shift by upper-class Greek society. By spurning all his lovers, Narcissus ends becoming enamoured with himself, "reject[ing] any meaningful relationship".

According to the neurologist and psychiatrist Edison Miyawaki, Ovid's account centers on illusion, self-recognition, and the tragedy of unfulfilled desire. Conon's version frames the story as a moralized tale about cruelty and punishment. Pausanias presents a more psychologically grounded narrative in which Narcissus mourns his deceased twin sister, interpreting the story as an expression of grief rather than self-love. The psychiatrist Arash Javanbakht argues that Narcissus exhibits a conflicted pattern of withdrawal and longing more consistent with schizoid–histrionic dynamics than narcissistic personality disorder. He also notes that Narcissus initially fails to recognize the reflection and that his fixation is a punishment imposed by Nemesis, not an inherent trait.

== Influence on culture ==
=== Literature ===
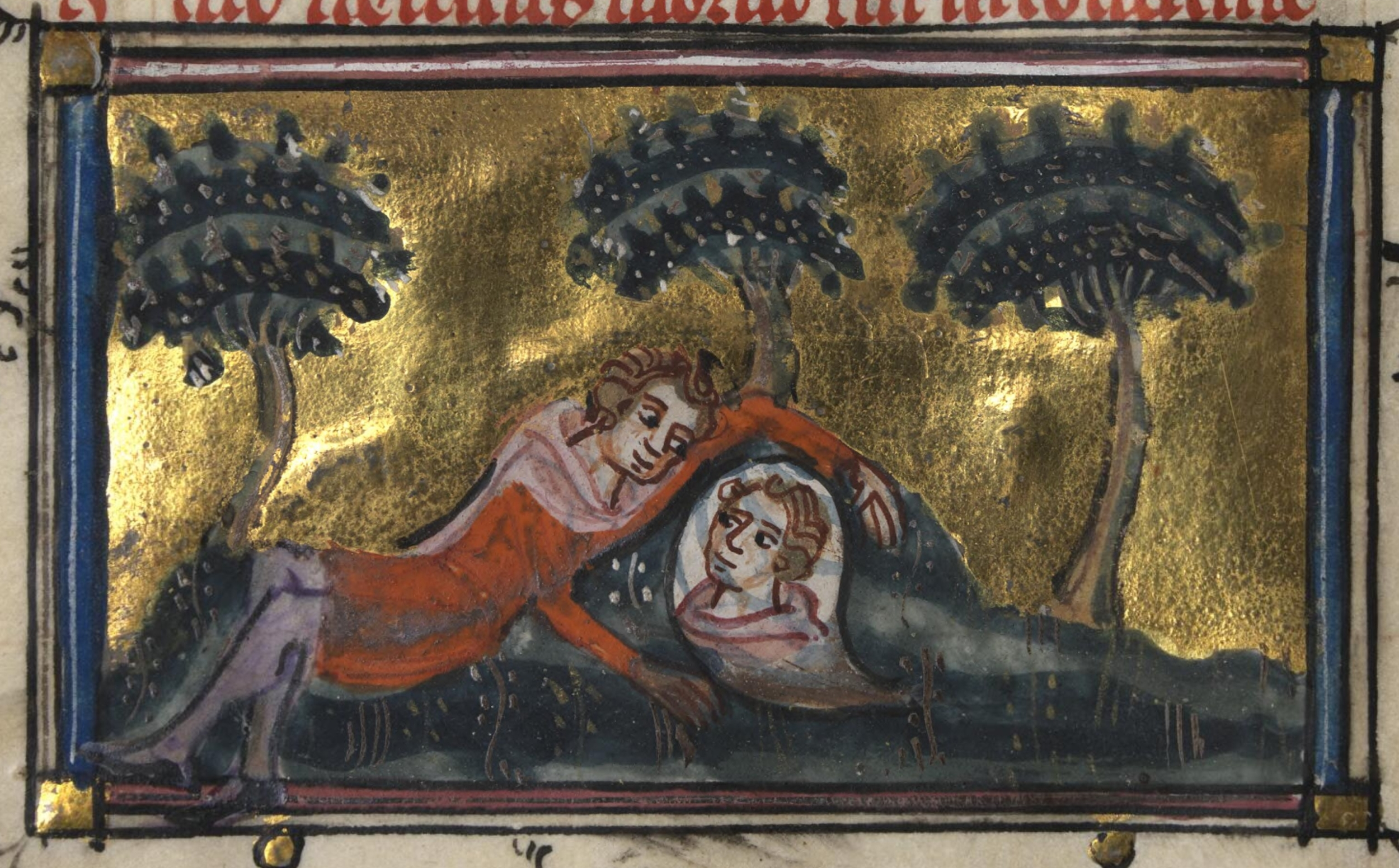
Narcissus gazes at the spring. From a 14th Century copy of Roman de la Rose.

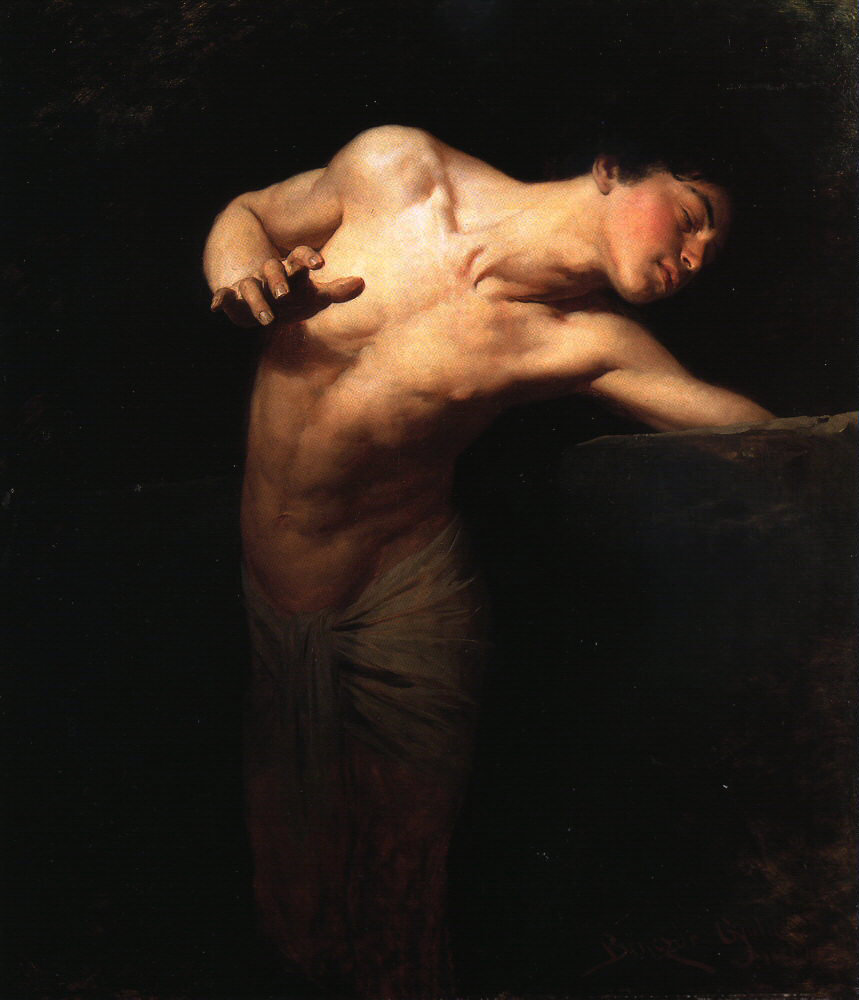
Narcissus by Gyula Benczúr

Oscar Wilde also used the myth within his works. One of his poems from 1894, The Disciple, continues the story of Narcissus after his death,

`We do not wonder that you should mourn in this manner for Narcissus, so beautiful was he.'

`But was Narcissus beautiful?' said the pool.

— The Oreads and the pool Narcissus gazed in, in Oscar Wilde, The Disciple, Poems in Prose

Before this Wilde published The Picture of Dorian Gray in 1890, and used Narcissus as an example of beauty multiple times. In Chapter 1, Lord Henry used the myth to describe the beauty of the man Basil (the protagonist) had painted. Basil explained to Lord Henry he did not want to part with his work because he had put much of himself into it.

...and this young Adonis, who looks as if he was made out of ivory and rose-leaves. Why, my dear Basil, he is a Narcissus, and you—well...

— Lord Henry, in Oscar Wilde, The Picture of Dorian Gray, Chapter 1

Paulo Coelho's The Alchemist also starts with a story about Narcissus, found (we are told) by the alchemist in a book brought by someone in the caravan. The alchemist's (and Coelho's) source was very probably Hesketh Pearson's The Life of Oscar Wilde (1946) in which this story is recorded (Penguin edition, p. 217) as one of Wilde's inspired inventions. This version of the Narcissus story is based on Wilde's "The Disciple" from his "Poems in Prose (Wilde) ".

Seamus Heaney references Narcissus in his poem "Personal Helicon" from his first collection "Death of a Naturalist":

To stare, big-eyed Narcissus, into some spring
Is beneath all adult dignity.

Petrarchan poetry, often in the form of a Petrarchan sonnet, has been profoundly impacted by the myth of Narcissus. Most notably, Petrarch's Sonnet 45 contains themes and motifs inspired by the myth of Narcissus when the love interest, Laura, loves her reflection more than the narrator.

=== Music ===
- In Gilbert and Sullivan's opera Patience, the idyllic poet Archibald Grosvenor calls himself "a very Narcissus" after gazing at his own reflection.
- Composer Nikolai Tcherepnin wrote his ballet "Narcisse et Echo, Op. 40" in 1911 for Sergei Diaghilev's Ballets Russes and was danced by Nijinski.
- The fifth of Benjamin Britten's Six Metamorphoses after Ovid for solo oboe (1951) is titled "Narcissus", "who fell in love with his own image and became a flower".

=== Visual art ===
Narcissus has been a subject for many painters such as Caravaggio, Poussin, Turner, Dalí, Waterhouse, Carpioni, Lagrenée, and Roos.

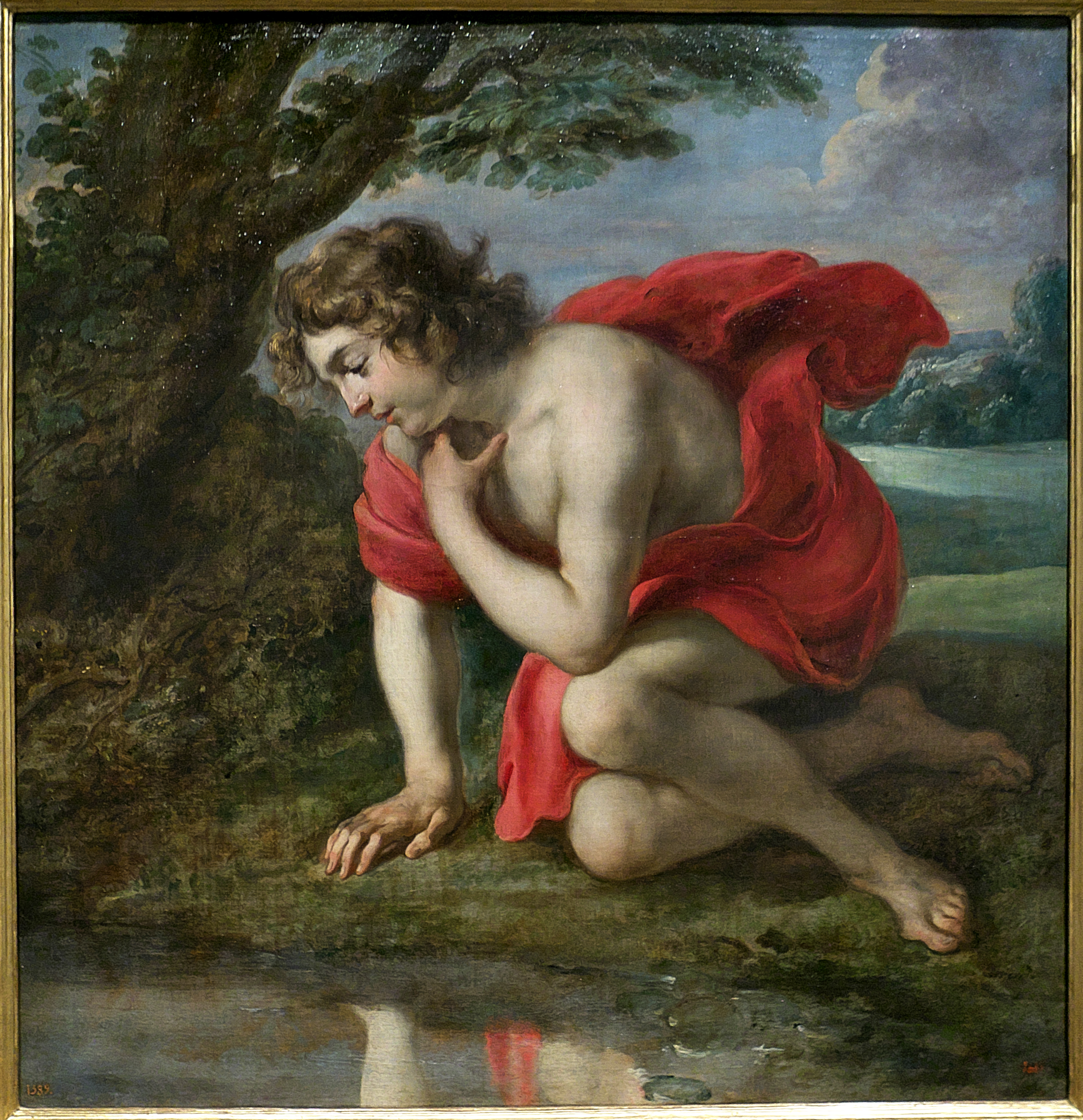
Narciso, Jan Cossiers

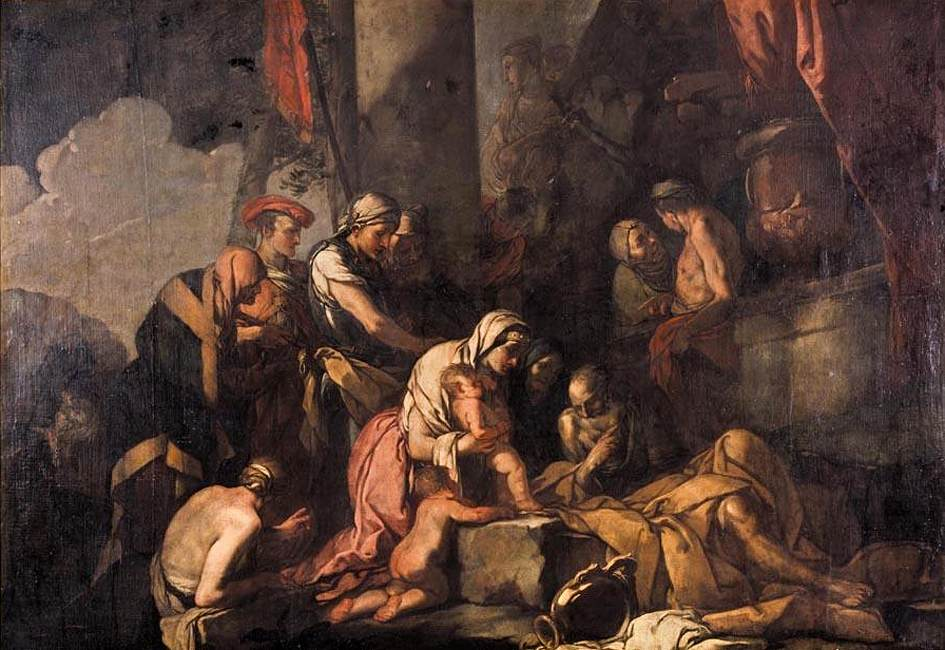
Liriope Bringing Narcissus before Tiresias, Giulio Carpioni

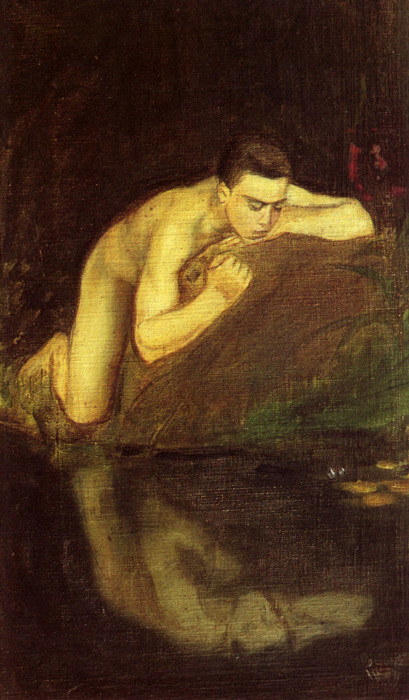
Narkisos, Magnus Enckell

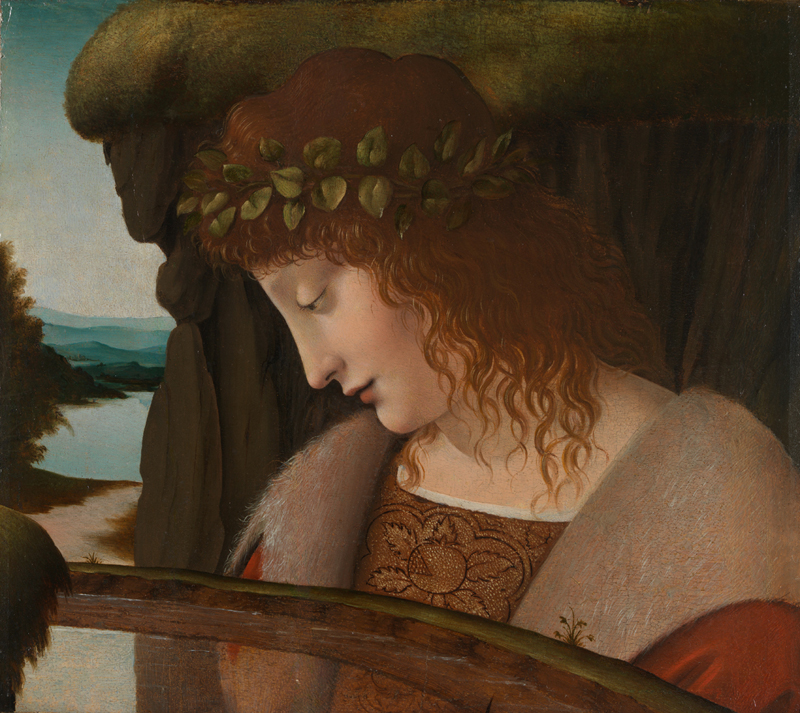
Narcissus, follower of Giovanni Antonio Boltraffio

Sculptors such as Paul Dubois, John Gibson, Henri-Léon Gréber, Benvenuto Cellini and Hubert Netzer have sculpted Narcissus.

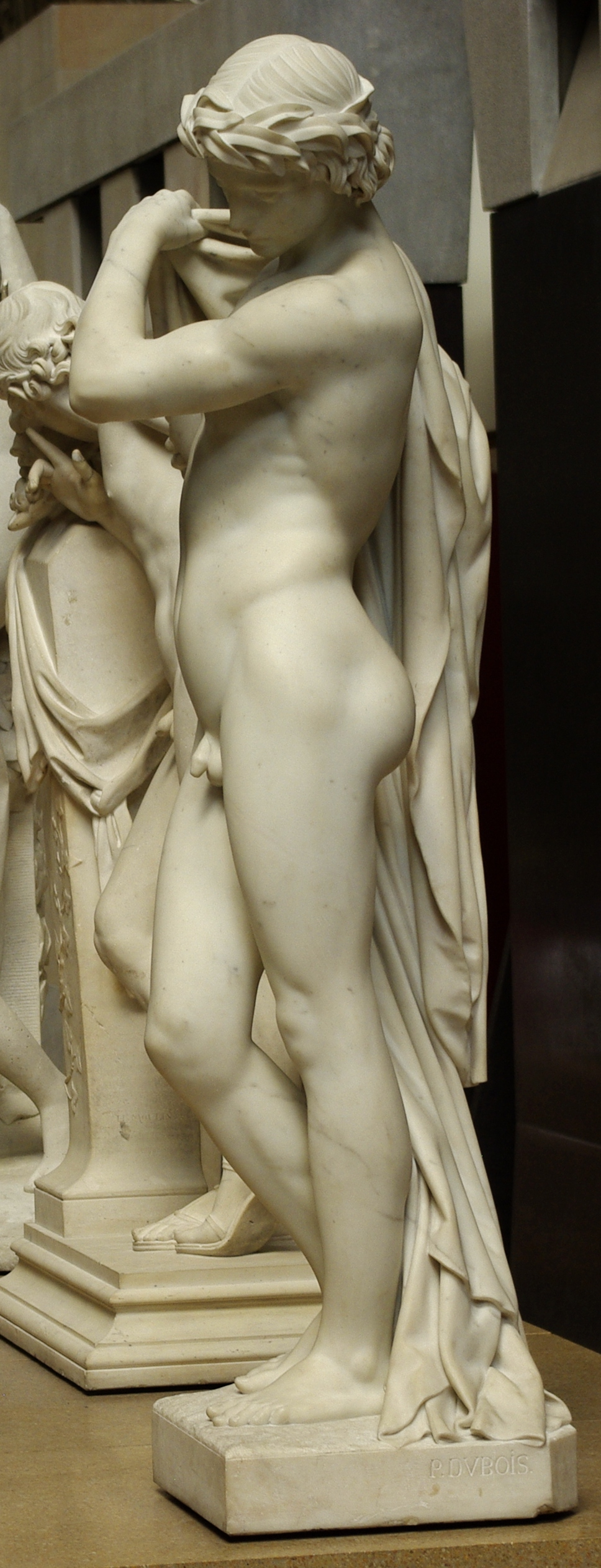
Narcisse, Paul Dubois

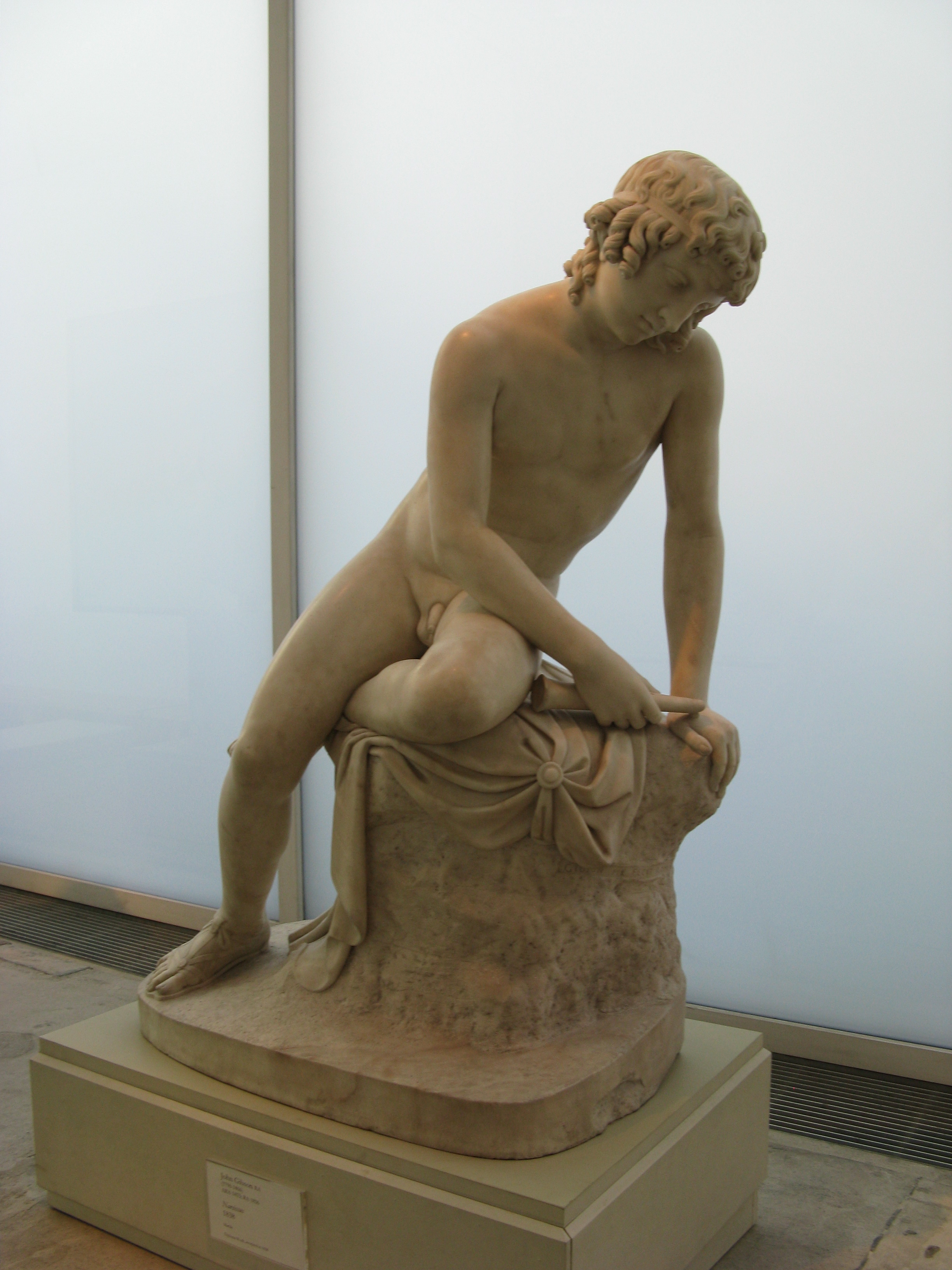
Narcissus, John Gibson

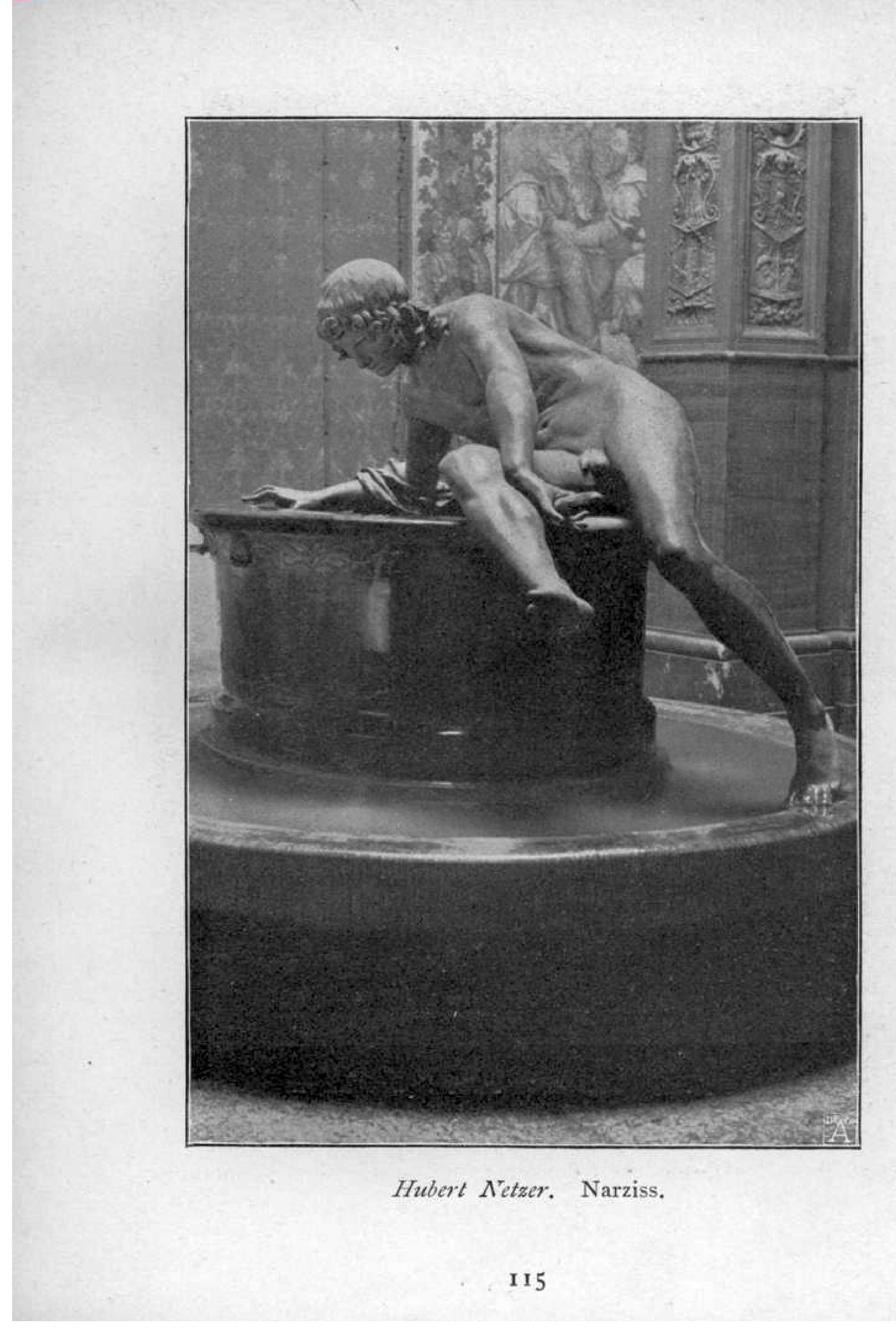
Narziss, Hubert Netzer

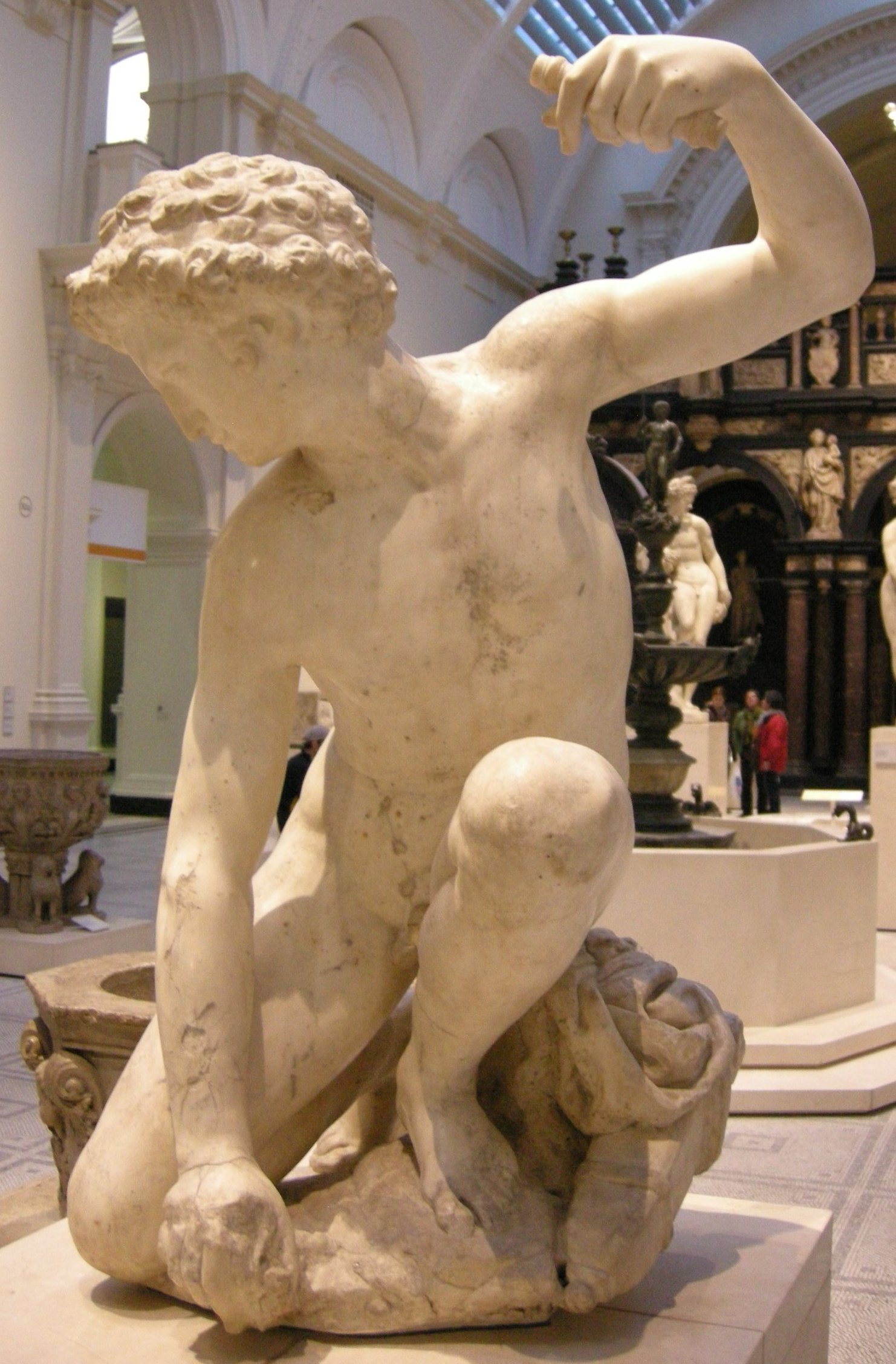
Narcissus, possibly Valerio Cioli

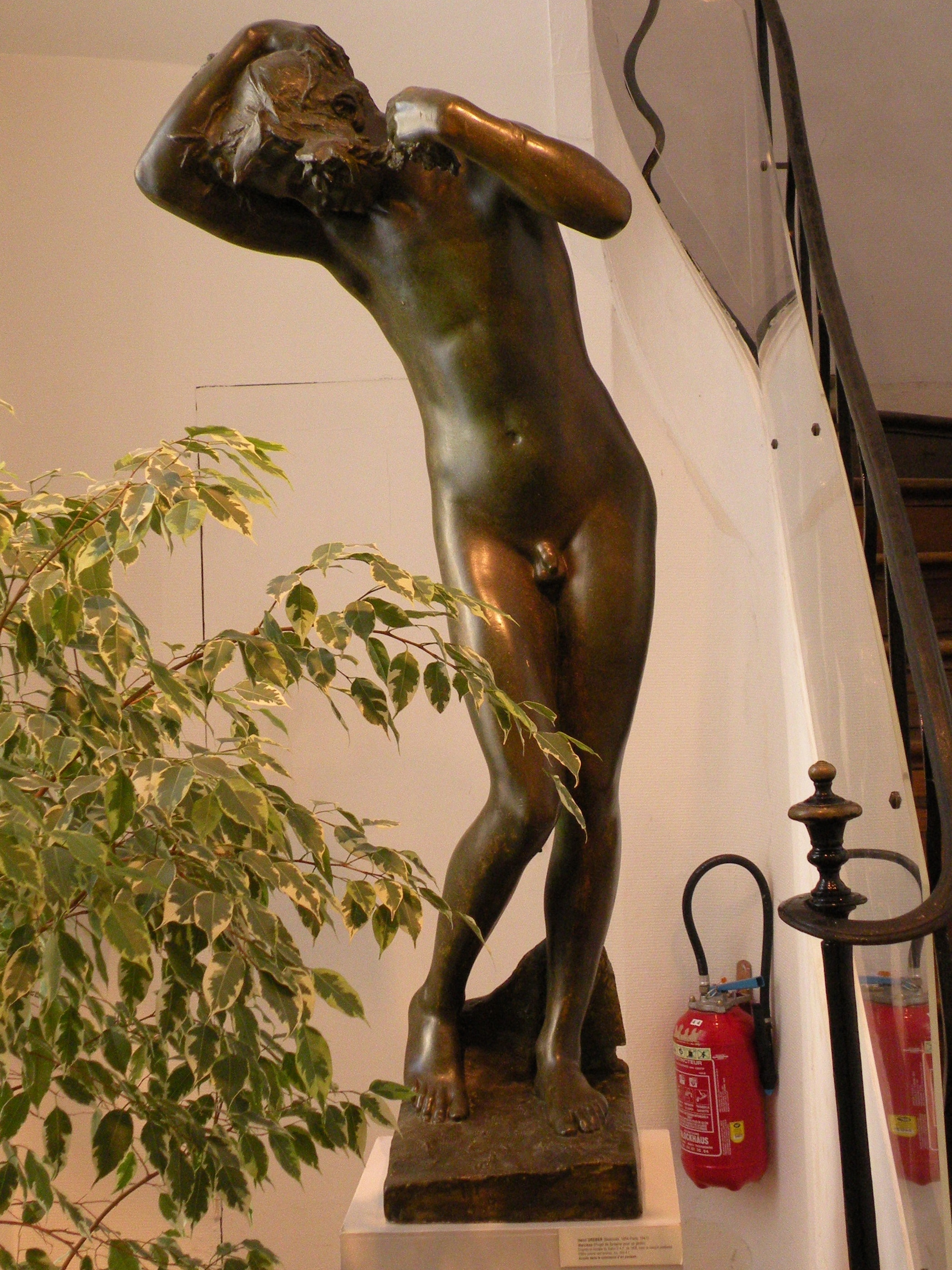
Narcisse, Henri-Léon Gréber

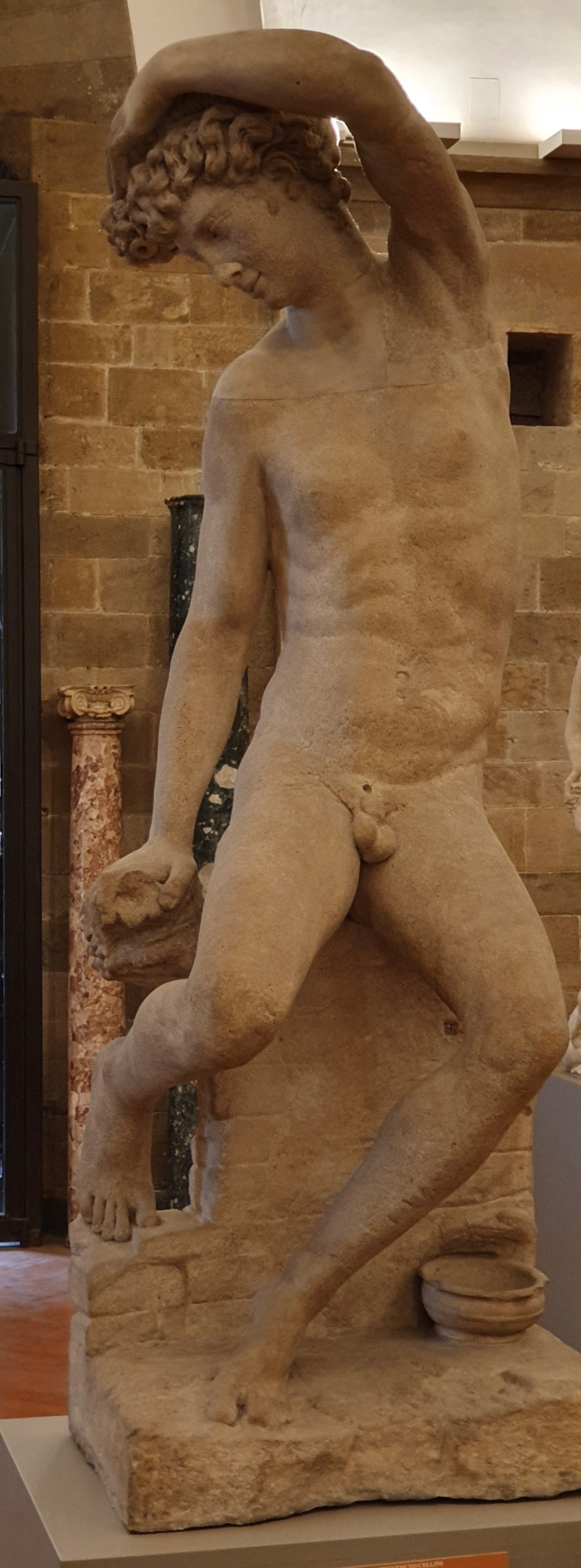
Narcisse, Benvenuto Cellini

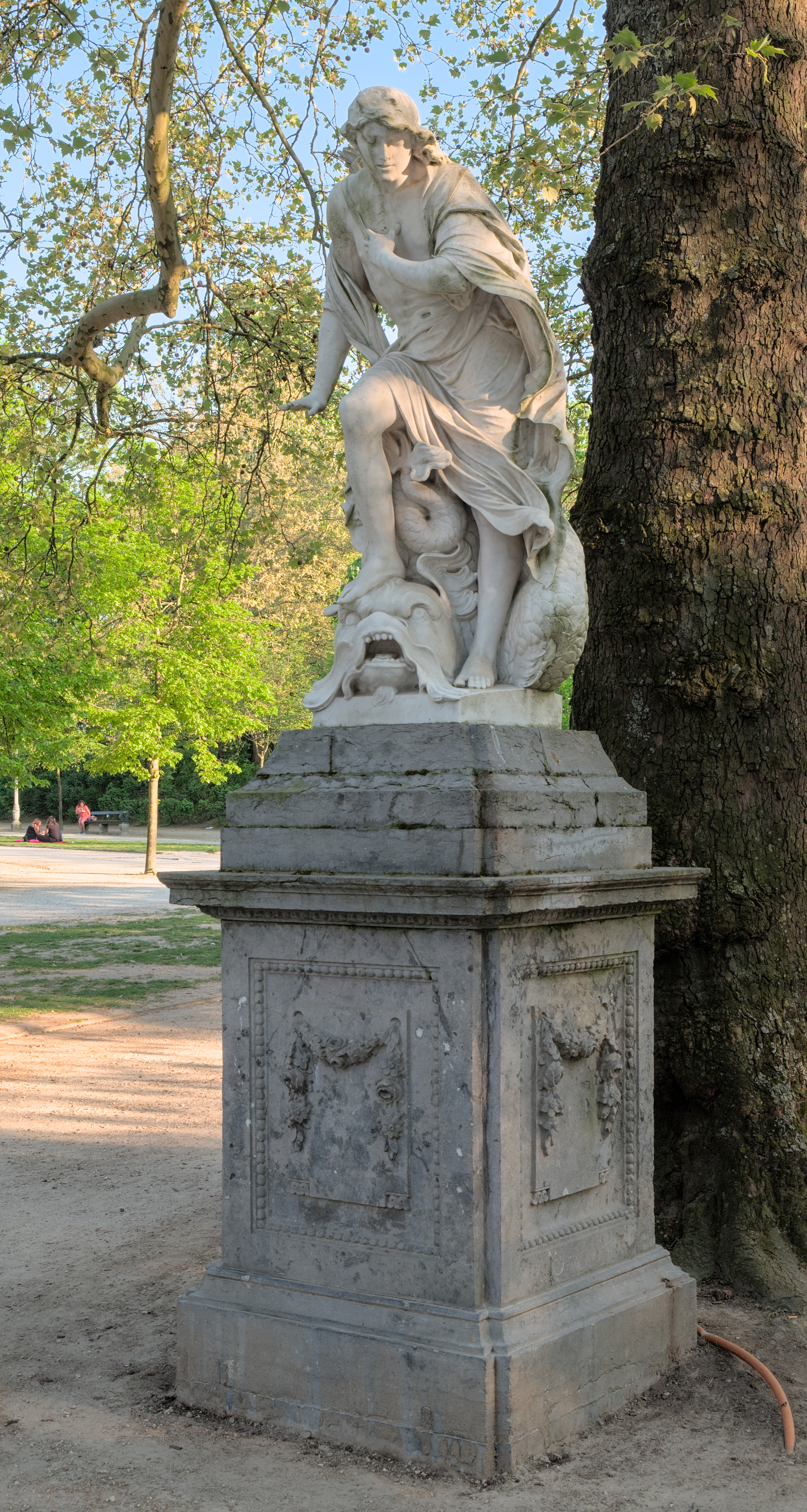
Narcisse, Gabriel Grupello and Albert Desenfans

== See also ==
- Egocentrism
