= Kalistrat Zografski =

Christian composer

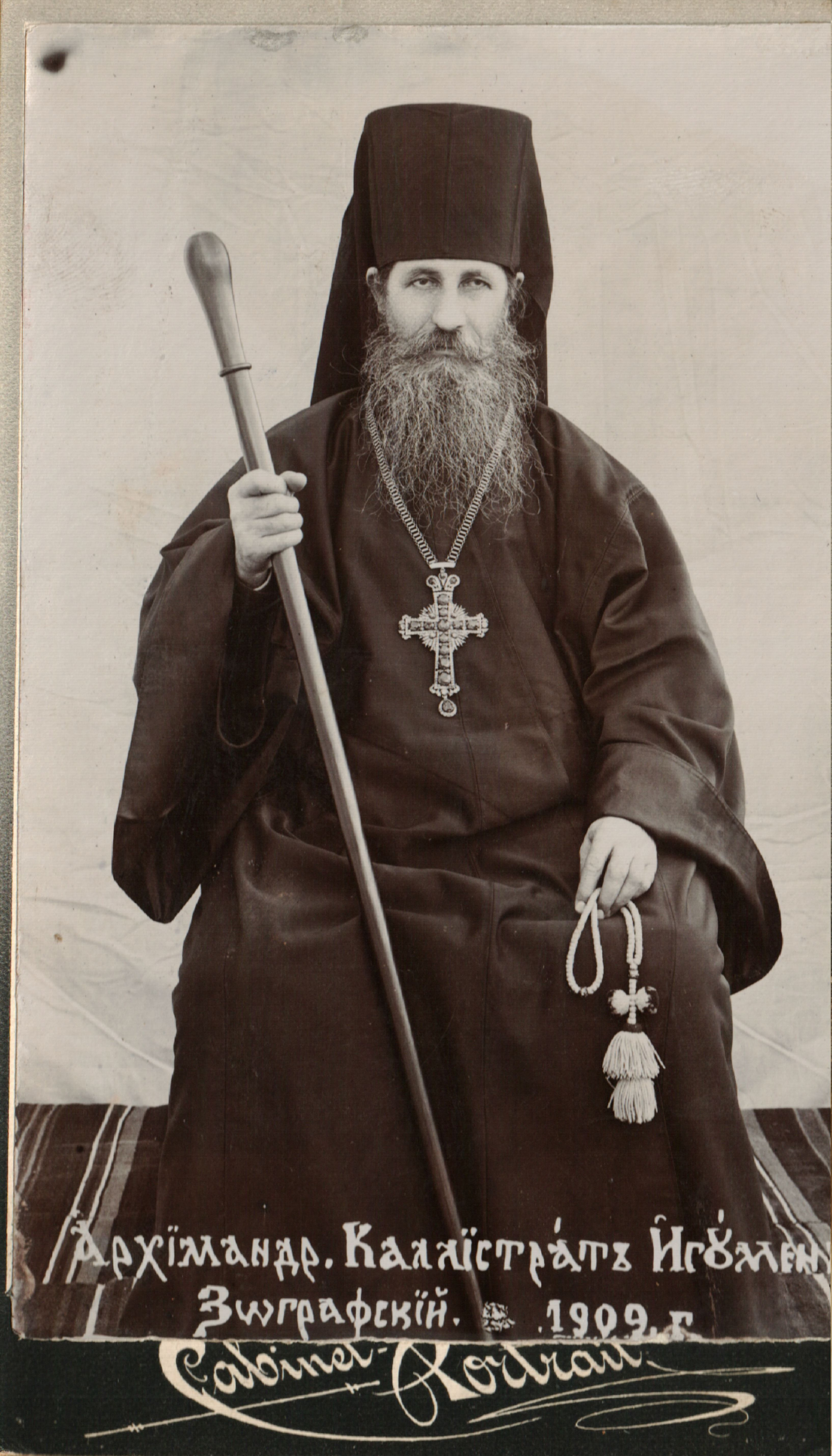
- Portrait of Kalistrat Zograf as abbot of the monastery Zograf.
- Born: Krastan Sandzhakov; 1821; Struga, Ottoman Empire
- Died: 1914 (aged 92–93); Zograf monastery, Greece
- Other name: Калистрат Зографски
- Education: Struga, Bitola, Thessaloniki
- Occupations: chanter, composer
- Known for: Reformer of Orthodox Church music

Kalistrat Zografski or Kalistrat of Zograf (Bulgarian: Калистрат Зографски; Greek: Καλλίστρατ ζωγράφος; Macedonian: Калистрат Зограф; c. 1821 – c. 1914) was a 19th-century Orthodox Christian composer, chanter, educator, Bulgarian abbot and archimandrite of the Zograf monastery, and reformer of Orthodox Church music.

== Early life ==
Born in Struga in 1821, then in Ottoman Empire, today in North Macedonia. Extensively educated and absorbed ascetic theologian, musicologist and philologist. While as a student in his pre-monastic period, he worked as a Greek language teacher, but also as a professor in Byzantine church music. While residing in the Zograf Monastery (Mount Athos) founded the music school and the translation calligraphic literary school. As а brilliant theorist of the nematic Byzantine musical tradition, furthermore composer and chanter on the one hand and an expert linguist in Medieval Greek, Church Slavonic, Modern Greek, Bulgarian and Romanian language on the other hand, he created timeless masterpieces and translations, thereby enriching the cultural heritage spiritual barns of the Orthodox ecumene to the utmost. Kalistrat Zografski is likely to be regarded as the best connoisseur of Byzantine neumatic ladder, created by the famous ascetic, composer and chanter, St. John Kukuzel (12th century). He died in 1914, as Archimandrite of the monastery Zograf, in Mount Athos, Greece. It is assumed for him being primary educated in his hometown and beyond. There is evidence for him attending the music school of Naum Miladinov. However, in Bulgarian Zograf monastery on Mount Athos developed extensive and fruitful theoretical, composer's and translational work, providing a widespread reputation among connoisseurs of the Eastern church music.

== His contribution as a master of psaltic art ==
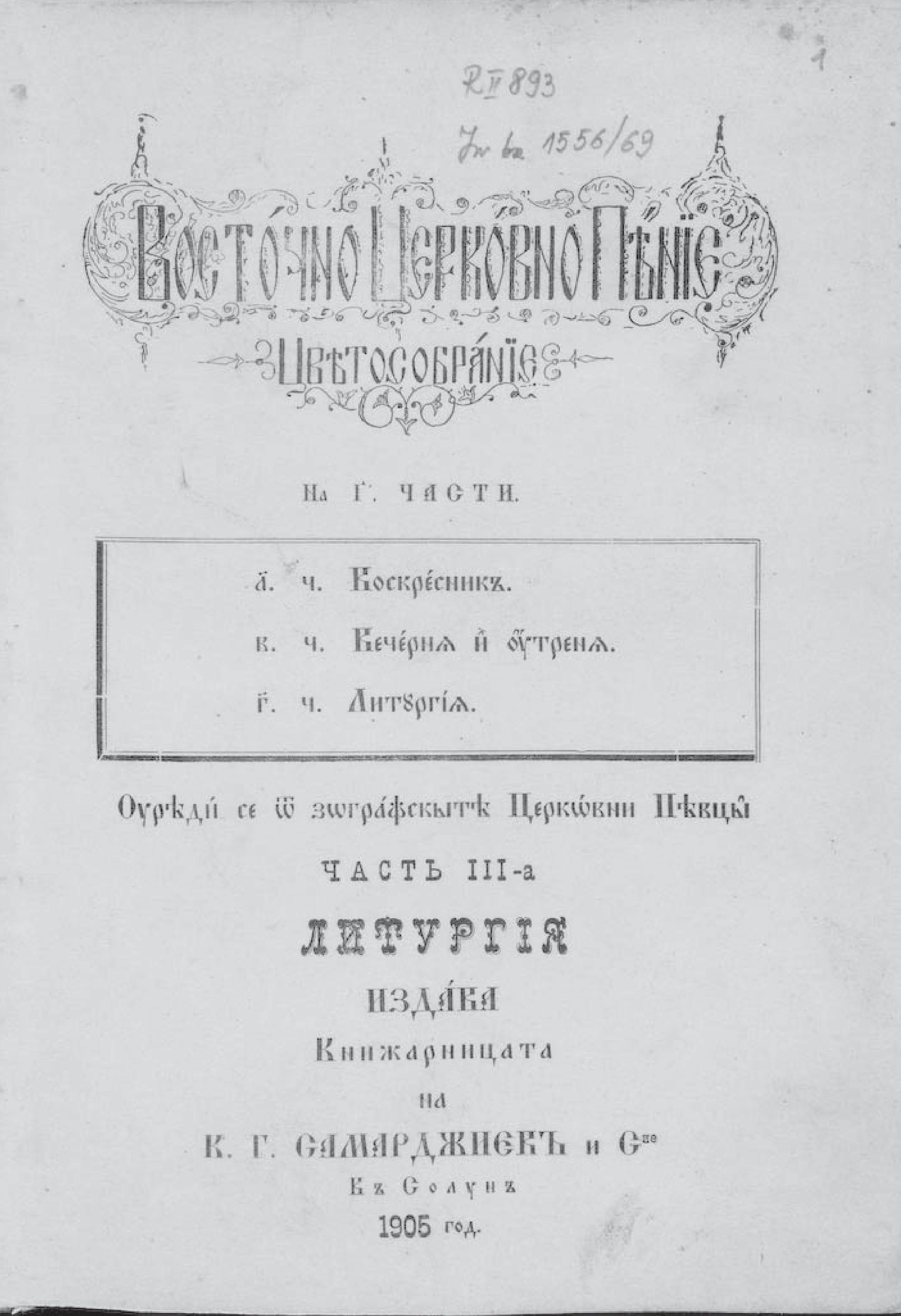
Eastern Church Chants, Part 3, 1905, by Archimandrite Kalistrat Zografski

Kalistrat's transcriptions of some of the Kukuzel's musical opus will be remembered as unsurpassed. He is the author of basic music literature as "Eastern church singing", published in four volumes, printed on Mount Athos in 1905 year. As a talented composer, he created several original compositions. The best known are the eucharistic canon "The Father and The Son ..." and "It's dignified" in different voices.

As an editor of the monastic publishing records and as a connoisseur in many classical and living languages, Kalistrat Zografski first translated and printed services of St. Kliment, St. Naum and Seven Saints, from Church Slavonic, encoded by the famous Moscopolski Code. He died in monastic Zograf's cell in 1914 year. Due to his humble, gnostic, and ascetic life, he is considered as one of the most beloved clerics of the athonite monastery Zografos. His relics are today stored in Zograf's monastery ossuary. His contribution to music and philology is the subject of numerous studies in scientific circles. The most significant piece by Kalistrat Zografski is a collection Eastern church chants, in four volumes, which were published in Thessaloniki in 1905. Namely, it is noteworthy to point out his extensive engagement to the full implementation of this church-musical work: as a theorist, editor of the whole publication and translator for numerous variants of Greek, Romanian, and Bulgarian, including transcription of works, written in the Kukuzel's notation to the new Chrisantos neumatic ladder.

For his gnostic, godly, ascetic life, he is considered one of the most beloved priests of Aton and as such he will remain in the eternal memory of his native Struga. It is because of his contribution to church and spiritual life of the people who gravitate to it Church "St. George "-Struga St. George. In the temple is inscribed the municipal decision of 1894 year, which reads:

Let the memory of Kalistrat be eternal for his contribution to the ecclesial communion and municipality.

== Reception history of Kalistrat Zografski ==
- About Archimandrite Kalistrat(Krastan Sandzakov) Zografski in the Macedonian Encyclopedia is written:

"Kalistrat Zografski (Krastan Sandzakov) (Struga 1821 ‡ Zografos monastery on Mount Athos 1913) ‡ theologian ecclesial-musical activist and composer of spiritual chants. The beginnings of its general and theological education he did were in his native city, and according to some information, theoretical foundations of Byzantine orthodox music they learned in the school of Naum Miladin. By leaving to the Holy Mountain, he was a teacher of Greek and gifted church chanter. In the church of Athos monastery Zografos, Kalistrat Zografski overall reached a duty Archimandrite. As editor in chief of the monastery's publications and translator of Greek and Romanian, he made a significant contribution to the enriching of ecclesial musical repertoire. From Greek, he translated the services of St. Clement, St. Naum, St. Sedmochislenitsi, and others. However, the most extensive work main author, as well as editor, is the four-volume work Chrisant notation 'Eastern ecclesial chant' (Thessaloniki, 1905) "

Harvard Dictionary of Music, lists Kalistrat Zografski as one of the important Macedonian ecclesiastical musical composers of the 19th century.

- The last major event and exhibition held in Athens, in honor of the most important monks, ascetics and personalities of monastic life on the territory of Greece, Archimandrite Kalistrat Zografski is presented in the bulletin as one of the very few extraordinary representative of the spiritual and cultural heritage in the referring orthodox community.

== Works ==
- Служба иже во Святих Отца нашего архιерарха и чудотворца Климента, архиепископа Болгарскаго иже во Охрид (1901)
- Служба Свѧтых Седмочисленник (1903)
- Восточно церковно пение; Цветособрание – част III – Литургия (1905)
- Источно црковно пеење(Eastern church chants)-Вечерно и утрено црковно пеење,автор-Калистрат Зографски, реиздание 2013
- Источно црковно пеење(Eastern church chants)-Литургија и Воскресеник,автор-Калистрат Зографски, реиздание 2013

== Gallery ==
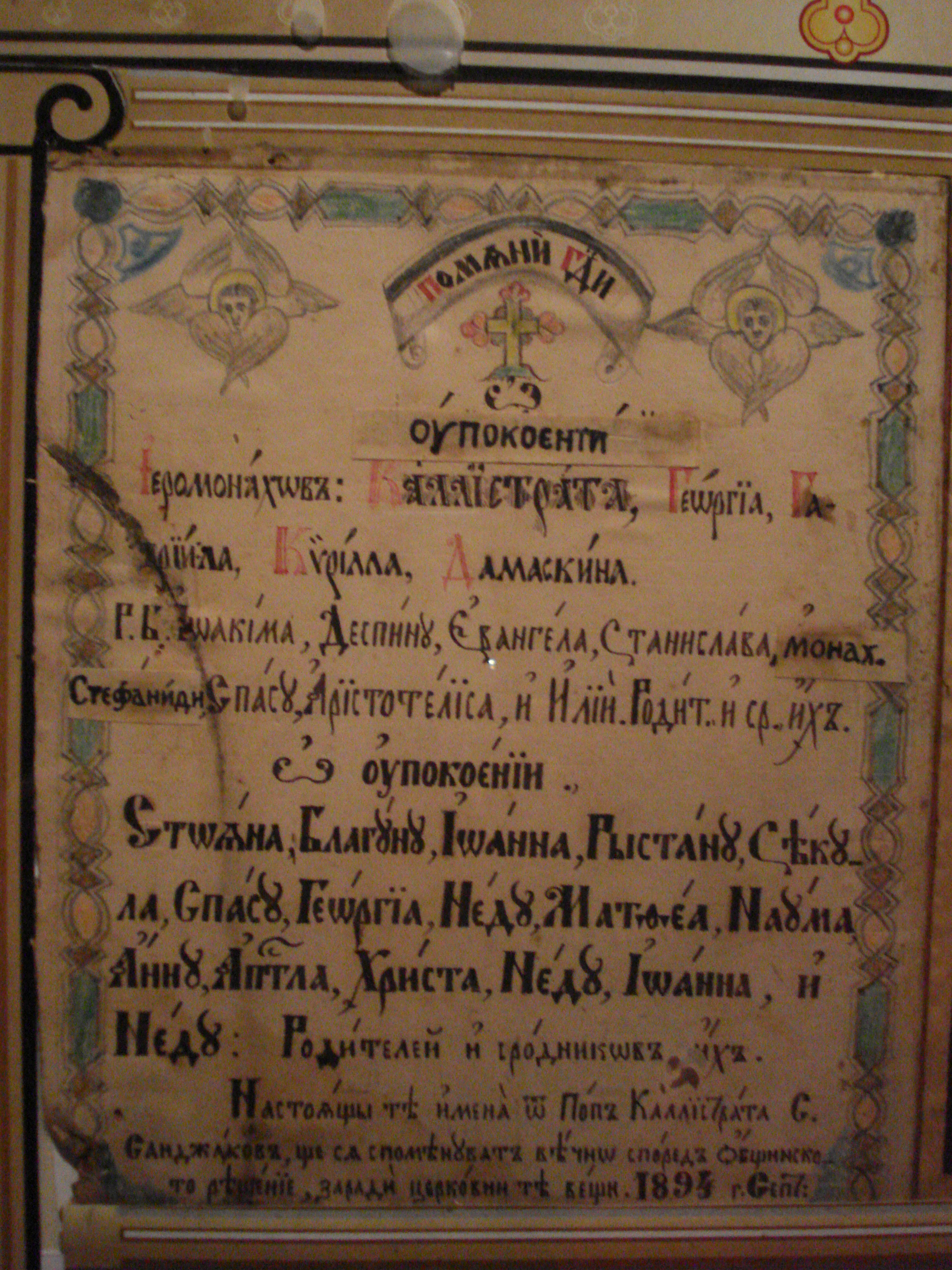
Diptych from the Cathedral of St. George the Victorious - Struga, 1894 with the name of Kalistrat Sandzhakov

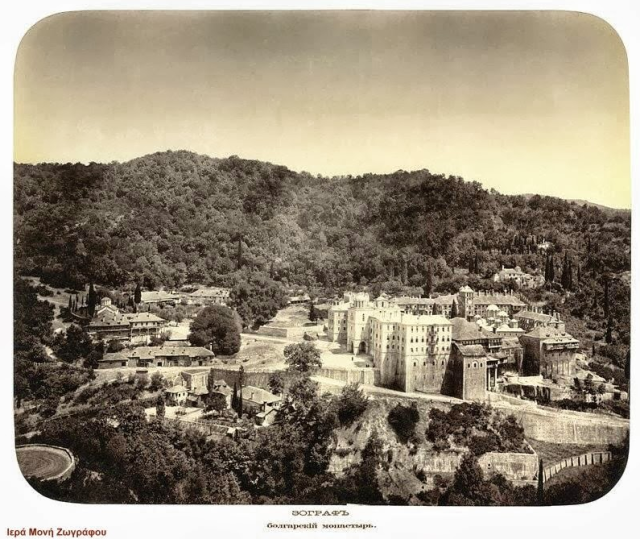
Picture of the monastery "Zograf", Mount Athos somewhere between 1867 and 1871

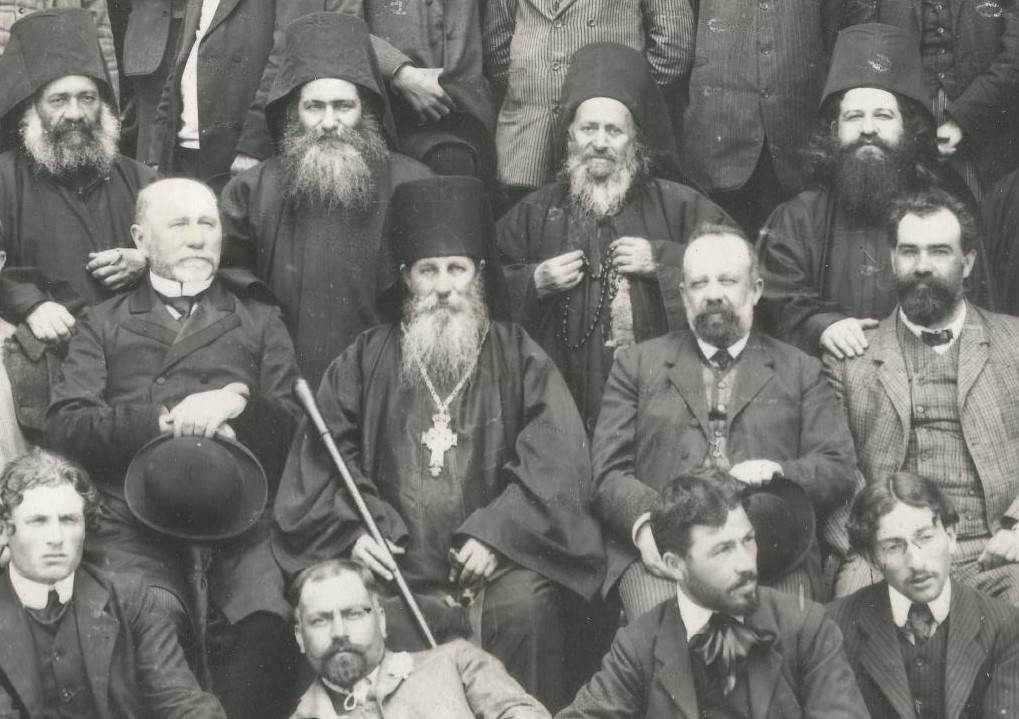
Kalistrat Zografski in Struga

== Public records ==
- https://www.youtube.com/watch?v=b4gq2CCTfUU
- https://www.youtube.com/watch?v=aE5DiI-VDSU
- https://www.youtube.com/watch?v=6eXdU-WJqfY
- https://www.youtube.com/watch?v=S8x-rIPY_W4
- https://www.youtube.com/watch?v=MVwzh7hd2k0

== Sources ==
- Short Spiritual History of Macedonia and MPC

=== Manuscripts ===
- "УСПЕНИЕ" периодика на манастирот Успение Богородичино, 5/2003, Јанковец – Преспа
- д-р Јане Коџобашија "Црковно-музичките дејци, Будителскиот дух", списание Премин бр. 3
- ѓ. Васко Голабоски – Света Гора Атонска историја и живот
