= Callistratus of Carthage =

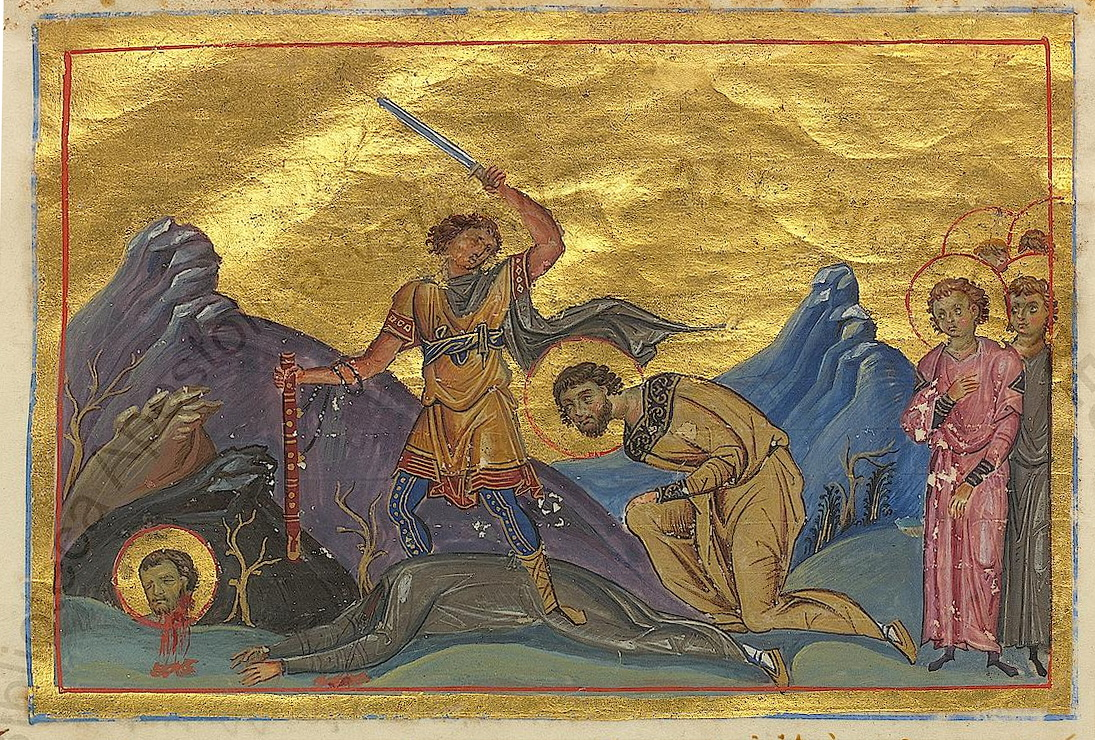
Martyrdom of Callistratus, from the Menologion of Basil II, p. 70.

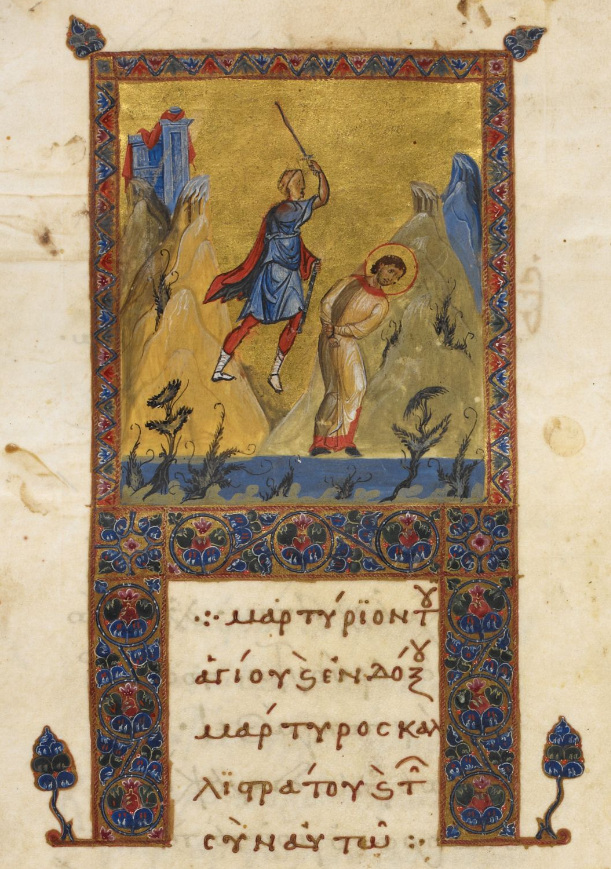
Martyrdom of Callistratus, from BL Add MS 11870, folio 209v.

Callistratus (Note: Also spelled Kallistratos, from Greek.) of Carthage and his forty-nine companions were Christian martyrs executed at Rome during the Diocletianic persecution (303–311), now commemorated as saints in the Roman Catholic and Eastern Orthodox churches. Their hagiography, known from the compilation of Symeon the Metaphrast, contains fantastic elements.

According to the hagiography, Callistratus was a native of Carthage and a member of the "Chalendon" cohors of the Roman army. He was caught praying by some pagan comrades and hauled before the military tribune, who ordered him to offer sacrifices to the pagan gods. He refused, was tortured and finally tied in a bag and thrown into the sea. He was rescued by a dolphin and, once ashore, preached the Gospel to the 49 soldiers who had witnessed his miraculous survival. All were converted and then all 50 were executed. Callistratus was cut into pieces. Some other Christian soldiers buried their bodies and a cult grew up at that location. Later a church was built on the spot. If this last part is at all accurate, they were among the first warrior saints with an established cult.

Callistratus and his companions are in the Martyrologium Romanum under September 26 and in the Synaxarium Ecclesiae Constantinopolitanae under September 27. The Armenian Apostolic Church commemorates Callistratus and his companions on the Monday after the fifth Sunday after Pentecost.

The earliest artistic depiction of Callistratus or his companions is in the Menologion produced for the Emperor Basil II around 1000. Despite his being a warrior saint, he is not depicted as a soldier. He is depicted beheaded. This seems to have set the standard for later depictions. The Metaphrastic biography is illustrated in British Library Add MS 11870 and Biblioteca Marciana gr. Z. 586 with a miniature of his execution. In Bodleian Library MS Barocci 86 he is one of the saints depicted in the frontispiece. He is shown as a prince. Similar iconography appears in later menologia. Callistratus and/or his companions are depicted in the Church of the Metamorphosis, the monasteries of Meteora and Cozia and in bust form in the church of Pelinovo.
