= Poems in Prose (Wilde collection) =

Prose poem set by Oscar Wilde

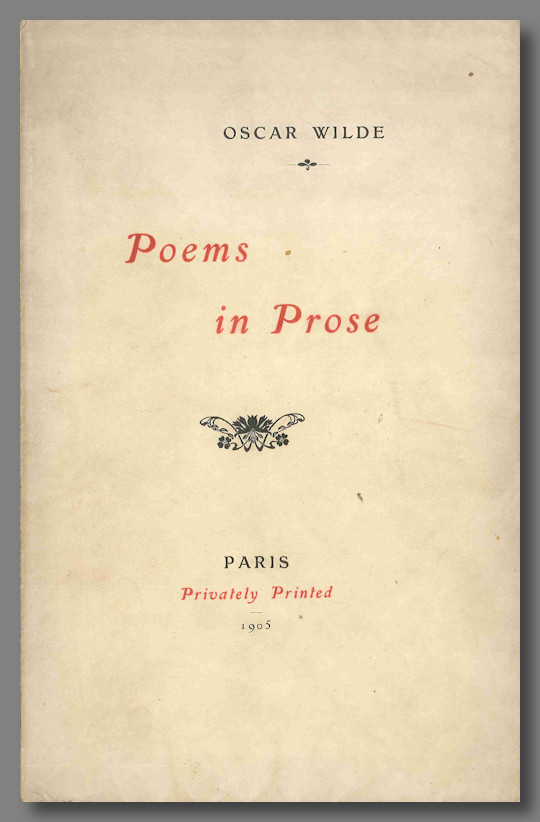
Privately Printed [by Charles Carrington], 1905.

Poems in Prose is the collective title of six prose poems published by Oscar Wilde in The Fortnightly Review (July 1894). Derived from Wilde's many oral tales, these prose poems are the only six that were published by Wilde in his lifetime, and they include (in order of appearance): "The Artist", "The Doer of Good", "The Disciple", "The Master", "The House of Judgment" and "The Teacher of Wisdom". Two of these prose poems, "The House of Judgment" and "The Disciple", had appeared earlier in The Spirit Lamp, an Oxford undergraduate magazine, on 17 February and 6 June 1893 respectively. A set of illustrations for the prose poems was completed by Wilde's friend and frequent illustrator, Charles Ricketts, who never published the pen-and-ink drawings in his lifetime. The set of prose poems was released in a privately printed chapbook in 1905.

== Form and influences ==
According to The New Princeton Encyclopedia of Poetry and Poetics, the defining traits of the prose poem are "unity even in brevity and poetic quality even without the line breaks of free verse: high patterning, rhythmic and figural repetition, sustained intensity, and compactness". Invented in the nineteenth century, the modern prose poem form is largely indebted to Charles Baudelaire's experiments in the genre, notably in his Petits poèmes en prose (1869), which created the subsequent interest in France exemplified by later writers such as Stéphane Mallarmé and Arthur Rimbaud. In English literature, Edgar Allan Poe and Charles Kingsley were progenitors of the form.

== Summaries ==
=== The Artist ===
In this prose poem, an artist is filled with the desire to create an image of "The Pleasure that abideth for a Moment". Able to fashion this image out of bronze only, he searches the world for the metal but all he can find is the bronze of one of his earlier pieces, "The Sorrow that endureth for Ever". The prose poem ends with the artist melting down his earlier creation to create his sculpture of "The Pleasure that abideth for a Moment".

=== The Doer of Good ===
This tale narrates the lives of four individuals after they have been helped by Christ. Noticing a man who is living exorbitantly, Christ asks him why he is living this way, to which the man replies that he was a leper and Christ healed him: how else should he live? Seeing another man lusting after a prostitute, Christ asks this man why he looks at the women in that way, to which he replies that he was blind but now can see: at what else should he look? Christ turns to the woman, and asks her, too, why she is living in sin: you have forgiven me my sins, she says in turn. Lastly, Christ comes upon a man weeping by the roadside. When Christ asks why he is weeping, the man replies: I was raised from the dead, so what else should I do but weep?

=== The Disciple ===
This story is told from the perspective of the reflection pool in which Narcissus gazed at himself. Beginning immediately after Narcissus' death, the prose poem captures the Oreads and the pool grieving for the loss of Narcissus. Seeing that the pool has become a "cup of salt tears", the Oreads try to console the pool, saying that it must be hard not to mourn for someone so beautiful. The pool, however, confesses that it did not know Narcissus was beautiful; instead, it admits that it is mourning because its own beauty was reflected in Narcissus' eyes.

"The Disciple" is used by Paulo Coelho as the basis for his prologue to The Alchemist.

=== The Master ===
Joseph of Arimathea comes upon a weeping man, who he mistakenly thinks is mourning because of Christ's crucifixion. Instead, the man confesses that he is grieving because, in spite of performing the same miracles as Christ performed, no one has crucified him.

=== The House of Judgment ===
Standing before God in the House of Judgment, a sinner listens to God read the list of his sins. After each catalogue of sins, the man replies that he has done those things of which he is accused. God, then, sentences the man to Hell, but the sinner replies that he has always lived there. God, then, sentences the man to go to Heaven, but the man responds by saying that in no way could he ever imagine Heaven. Stumped by the man's replies, God must remain silent.

=== The Teacher of Wisdom ===
A disciple preaches the gospel to the multitudes but finds that he remains unhappy. The man's soul warns him that he is dividing his treasure by giving away his knowledge of God, after which the man hoards his remaining knowledge and makes shelter in a cave in which a centaur had lived. Having lived in the cave for some while, the hermit encounters a robber passing by one day. The robber is arrested by the hermit's glare, which the latter says is a look of pity because he has treasure more valuable than all of the robber's stolen goods. The robber threatens the hermit, but the hermit will not give away his knowledge until the robber threatens to sell his stolen treasure for the pleasures of the city. Finally, the hermit gives away his remaining knowledge and expires, but is then greeted by God, who tells the man that he will now know the perfect love of God.
