= Dennis =

Name list

- Pronunciation: /ˈdɛn.ɪs/
- Gender: Male
- Language: Greek, Latin, English, Danish, Swedish
- Name day: Sweden: August 7

Origin
- Meaning: Dionysus
- Region of origin: Greece

Other names
- Alternative spelling: Denis, Dennys
- Variant form: Denise (Female)
- Nicknames: Denny, Deni
- Related names: Denis, Dinis, Diniz, Sidney

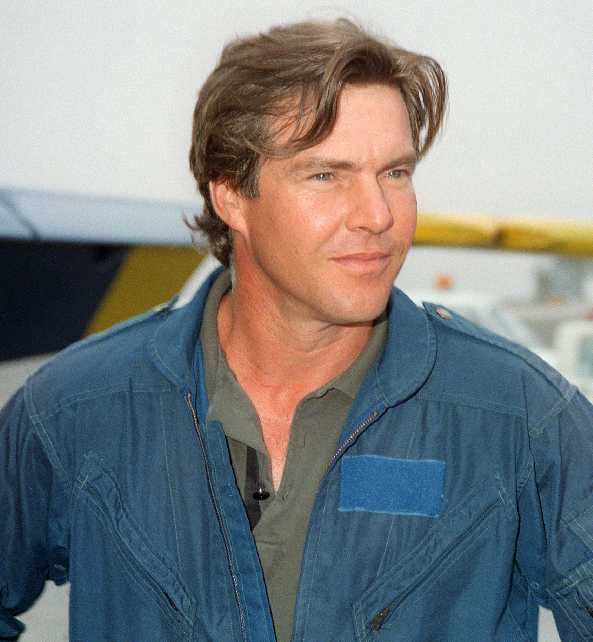
Actor Dennis Quaid

Dennis or Denis is a first or last name from the Greco-Roman name Dionysius, via one of the Christian saints named Dionysius.

The name came from Dionysus, the Greek god of ecstatic states, particularly those produced by wine, which is sometimes said to be derived from the Greek Dios (Διός, "of Zeus") and Nysos or Nysa (Νῦσα), where the young god was raised. Dionysus (or Dionysos; also known as Bacchus in Roman mythology and associated with the Italic Liber), the Thracian god of wine, represents not only the intoxicating power of wine, but also its social and beneficent influences. He is viewed as the promoter of civilization, a lawgiver, and a lover of peace—as well as the patron deity of both agriculture and the theatre.

Dionysus is a god of mystery religious rites, such as those practised in honour of Demeter and Persephone at Eleusis near Athens. In the Thracian mysteries, he wears the "bassaris" or fox-skin, symbolizing new life. (See also Maenads.)

A mediaeval Latinised form of the Anglo-Norman surname Le Denys was Dacus, which correctly meant Dacian, but when the Vikings were about was often used to mean "Danish" or "The Dane". The name became modernised as Denys, then later as Dennis.

Alternative forms and spellings of the name include Denis, Denys, Dennys, Denish, Deon, Deonne, Deonte, and Dion, Dionice. Diminutive forms include Den, Dennoh, Deno, Denny, Deny and Deen.

The name Sydenie (alternate spellings: Sydney or Sidney) may derive from a village in Normandy called Saint-Denis. A medieval diminutive was Dye, from which the names Dyson and Tyson are derived.

Dennis is a very popular English, Irish and Danish name, common throughout the English-speaking world, and a very popular French name, common throughout the Francophone world. It is also common as a German, Italian, Dutch, Croatian, Belarusian, Ukrainian, Russian, Bulgarian, Brazilian, Bosnian, and Albanian name.

Dionizy is the Polish version of the name, while Dionigi and Dionisio are the Italian versions of the name. The Irish name Donnchadh is sometimes anglicised as Denis, but has a different origin and is in fact related to the names Duncan and Donagh. Feminine versions of the name include: Denise, Denisa, Deni, Denice, Deniece, Dione, and Dionne.

== Variants ==
- Dānnísī (丹尼斯): Chinese
- Dénes, Dienes, Gyenis, Gyenes: Hungarian
- Denis: Albanian, Bosnian, Bulgarian (Денис), Croatian, Czech, English, French, German, Italian, Macedonian (Денис), Polish, Portuguese, Romanian, Russian (Денис), Serbian (also Денис), Slovak, Slovene
- Deniseu (데니스): Korean
- Denisas: Lithuanian
- Deniss: Latvian
- Denisu (デニス): Japanese
- Denijs: Middle Dutch
- Deniz: Turkish (actual meaning is sea) A common male and female Turkish name, etymologically not related to "Dennis", but based on the Turkish word for "sea": 'deniz'.
- Dênis: Portuguese (Brazilian)
- Dennis: Danish, Dutch, English, German, Norwegian, Swedish
- Denny: English
- Denys (Денис): Ukrainian
- Dinis, Diniz, Dionísio: Portuguese
- Dion: English, French (medieval diminutive), Greek (diminutive: Δίων)
- Dionigi: Italian
- Dionisius, Dennis : Indonesian
- Dionís: Catalan
- Dionise, Dionisie: Romanian
- Dionisije (Дионисије): Serbian
- Dionisio: Italian, Spanish
- Dionisos (Դիոնիսոս): Armenian
- Dionizy; Dionizjusz (archaic): Polish
- Dionysios (Διονύσιος): Greek
- Dionýz: Slovak
- Diviš: Czech
- Donncha: Irish
- Dzianis (Дзяніс): Belarusian
- Genis (Генис): Udmurt
- Tõnis: Estonian

== People with the given name Dennis ==
=== Common combinations with the given name Dennis ===
- Dennis Allen
- Dennis Anderson
- Dennis Avery
- Dennis Bailey
- Dennis Baker
- Dennis Bell
- Dennis Bennett
- Dennis Blair
- Dennis Boles
- Dennis Boyd
- Dennis Brown
- Dennis Burton
- Dennis Carter
- Dennis Casey
- Dennis Davis
- Dennis Donovan
- Dennis Dougherty
- Dennis Edwards
- Dennis Elwell
- Dennis Evans
- Dennis Flores
- Dennis Francis
- Dennis Freeman
- Dennis Gallagher
- Dennis Geiger
- Dennis Gibson
- Dennis Gilbert
- Dennis Green
- Dennis Greene
- Dennis Hale
- Dennis Hampson
- Dennis Harris
- Dennis Hayden
- Dennis Hayes
- Dennis Hickey
- Dennis Hughes
- Dennis Isherwood
- Dennis James
- Dennis Jennings
- Dennis Jensen
- Dennis John
- Dennis Johnson
- Dennis Jones
- Dennis Kelly
- Dennis Kennedy
- Dennis King
- Dennis Law
- Dennis Lawrence
- Dennis Lee
- Dennis Leigh
- Dennis Leonard
- Dennis Lloyd
- Dennis Lyons
- Dennis Marks
- Dennis Marshall
- Dennis Matthews
- Dennis McCarthy
- Dennis McCord
- Dennis McCoy
- Dennis McGuire
- Dennis McNamara
- Dennis Millar
- Dennis Miller
- Dennis Montgomery
- Dennis Moore
- Dennis Moran
- Dennis Morgan
- Dennis Morris
- Dennis Mullins
- Dennis Murphy
- Dennis Murray
- Dennis Nelson
- Dennis Nolan
- Dennis O'Brien
- Dennis O'Connor
- Dennis O'Neill
- Dennis O'Sullivan
- Dennis Olsen
- Dennis Peters
- Dennis Phillips
- Dennis Rasmussen
- Dennis Richardson
- Dennis Rivera
- Dennis Roberts
- Dennis Robertson
- Dennis Schmidt
- Dennis Scott
- Dennis Smith
- Dennis Stewart
- Dennis Sullivan
- Dennis Taylor
- Dennis Thompson
- Dennis Walker
- Dennis Ward
- Dennis Waterman
- Dennis White
- Dennis Williams
- Dennis Wilson
- Dennis Young

=== A–E ===
- Dennis van Aarssen (born 1994), Dutch singer
- Dennis Aase (1942–2023), American race car driver
- Dennis Abgrall (born 1953), Canadian ice hockey player
- Dennis Edward Aboagye (born 1985), Ghanaian politician
- Dennis Acton, American politician
- Dennis Adams (born 1948), American artist
- Dennis Adams (boxer) (1934–1971), American boxer
- Dennis Adeniran (born 1999), English footballer
- Dennis Dominic Adjei (born 1964), Ghanaian judge
- Dennis Adkins, American politician
- Dennis Agajanian, American musician
- Dennis Agyekum (born 1996), Ghanaian footballer
- Dennis A. Ahlburg, Australian economist
- Dennis Akumu (1934–2016), Kenyan politician and trade union leader
- Dennis Alas (born 1985), Salvadoran football player
- Dennis Albaugh (born 1955), American billionaire, founder and chairman of Albaugh LLC
- Dennis Alcapone (born 1947), Jamaican reggae DJ and record producer
- Dennis Alexander (1935–2011), English footballer
- Dennis Alexio (born 1959), American kickboxer
- Dennis Algiere (born 1960), American politician
- Dennis Allison, American academic
- Dennis Altman, Australian academic and gay rights activist
- Dennis Alvdén (born 1997), Swedish politician
- Dennis E. Alward (1859–1930), American government official
- Dennis Oguerinwa Amadi, Nigerian politician
- Dennis Amato (born 1980), German footballer
- Dennis Amiss (born 1943), English cricketer and administrator
- Dennis Dengsø Andersen (born 1949), Danish sailor
- Dennis Andersson (born 1991), Swedish motorcycle rider
- Dennis Andres (born 1987), German-Canadian actor and stuntman
- Dennis Andries (born 1953), Guyanese boxer
- Dennis Antal (born 2005), English footballer
- Dennis Aogo (born 1987), German footballer
- Dennis Appiah (born 1992), French footballer
- Dennis Apuan (1964–2020), American politician
- Dennis Arakaki (born 1942), American politician and social worker
- Dennis Archer (born 1942), American jurist and politician
- Dennis Archer (cricketer) (born 1963), Bermudian cricketer
- Dennis Argall (1943–2023), Australian diplomat
- Dennis Armfield (born 1986), Australian rules footballer
- Dennis Armitage (1928–2005), British artist
- Dennis Arundell (1898–1988), English actor
- Dennis Ashbaugh, American painter
- Dennis Lee Askew (1953–2016), American author and musician
- Dennis Aspinall (born 1947), Australian rules footballer
- Dennis Assanis (born 1959), Greek-American mechanical engineer
- Dennis Atiyeh (born 1963), Syrian wrestler
- Dennis Atkins, Australian journalist
- Dennis Aust (born 1940), American baseball player
- Dennis Austin (1947–2023), American software developer
- Dennis Avoth (1947–2023), Egyptian-born British boxer
- Dennis Awtrey (born 1948), American basketball player
- Dennis Ayling (1917–1998), British cinematographer
- Dennis Baddeley (1921–2006), English rugby league footballer
- Dennis Bain (born 1990), Bahamian sprinter and hurdler
- Dennis Baino (born 1975), Surinamese footballer
- Dennis Bakhtov (born 1979), Russian boxer
- Dennis Baldry (born 1931), English cricketer
- Dennis Bamburg Jr., American politician
- Dennis Banda (born 1988), Zambian footballer
- Dennis Banda (politician) (born 1941), Canadian politician
- Dennis Banks (1937–2017), American indigenous activist, teacher and author
- Dennis Banton (1930–2010), English cricketer
- Dennis Barden (born 1936), British mathematician
- Dennis Bardens (1911–2004), British writer
- Dennis Barker (1929–2015), British journalist
- Dennis Baron (born 1944), American linguist
- Dennis Barrie, American museum director
- Dennis Barth (1951–1978), Jamaican gangster
- Dennis Bartley (born 1944), Australian rules footballer
- Dennis Barton (1939–2022), Canadian politician
- Dennis Báthory-Kitsz (born 1949), Hungarian-American author and composer
- Dennis E. Batt, American journalist and activist
- Dennis Bauer (born 1980), German fencer
- Dennis Baxley (born 1952), American politician
- Dennis Beecraft (born 1968), Australian rugby league footballer
- Dennis Beemsterboer (born 1982), Dutch rower
- Dennis Bekkers (born 1980), Dutch taekwondo practitioner
- Dennis Belindo (1938–2009), Kiowa-Diné painter, educator, analyst and activist
- Dennis Bendall (born 1956), Australian rugby league player
- Dennis Bennie, American venture capitalist
- Dennis Bergkamp (born 1969), Dutch footballer
- Dennis D. Berkey, mathematician and college administrator
- Dennis Berkholtz (born 1945), American handball player
- Dennis Bermudez (born 1986), American mixed martial artist
- Dennis Berran (1887–1943), American baseball player
- Dennis Berry (1921–1994), English musician, composer, arranger and producer
- Dennis Berry (director) (1944–2021), American-French film director, actor and screenwriter
- Dennis Bevington (born 1953), Canadian politician
- Dennis Beyak, Canadian sportscaster
- Dennis Biddle (born 1935), American baseball player
- Dennis Bilde (born 1989), Danish bridge player
- Dennis Binder (born 1928), American singer-songwriter
- Dennis Bingham (1880–1940), British polo player
- Dennis Biodrowski (1940–2014), American football player
- Dennis Black (born 1939), American politician
- Dennis Blake (born 1970), Jamaican track and field athlete
- Dennis A. Blakeslee (1856–1933), American politician
- Dennis Bland (1911–1997), English cricketer
- Dennis Bligen (born 1962), American football player
- Dennis Bloem (born 1952), South African politician
- Dennis Blundell (1921–2003), British speed skater
- Dennis Bock, Canadian writer and lecturer
- Dennis E. Bolen, Canadian novelist
- Dennis Bond (1947–2025), English footballer
- Dennis Bonnen (born 1972), American businessman and politician
- Dennis Bonner (born 1964), American politician
- Dennis Bonvie (born 1973), Canadian ice hockey player
- Dennis Booth (born 1949), English footballer
- Dennis Jose Borbon, Filipino fraudster
- Dennis Borcky (born 1964), American football player
- Dennis Borkowski (born 2002), German footballer
- Dennis Bots (born 1974), Zambian-Dutch film director
- Dennis C. Bottorff (born 1944), American business executive
- Dennis Bounds, American news anchor
- Dennis Boutsikaris (born 1952), American character actor
- Dennis Bovell (born 1953), Barbadian-British reggae musician
- Dennis Bowen (1950–2012), American character actor
- Dennis Bowsher (born 1983), American modern pentathlete
- Dennis Bozic (born 1990), Swedish ice hockey player
- Dennis Bradley, American attorney and politician
- Dennis Bradshaw (born 1936), American tennis player
- Dennis Bradwell, 19th-century British businessman
- Dennis Brain (1921–1957), English virtuoso horn player
- Dennis Bray (born 1939), British biologist
- Dennis Breakwell (born 1948), English cricketer
- Dennis Eugene Breedlove (1939–2012), American botanist
- Dennis Brickley (1929–1983), English footballer
- Dennis Bright, Sierra Leonean politician
- Dennis Brinkmann (born 1978), German footballer and manager
- Dennis Broad (born 1956), South African cricketer
- Dennis Brock (born 1995), German footballer
- Dennis Brockenborough, American musician
- Dennis Bromley (1924–2015), British gerontologist
- Dennis Brookes (1915–2006), English cricketer
- Dennis G. Brummitt (1881–1935), American politician
- Dennis Brunod (born 1978), Italian ski mountaineer and sky-runner
- Dennis Brutus (1924–2009), South African activist and writer
- Dennis Bryon (1949–2024), Welsh rock drummer
- Dennis Buchanan (1932–2001), Australian airline owner
- Dennis Buchner (born 1977), German politician
- Dennis Budimir (1938–2023), American jazz and rock guitarist
- Dennis Bührer (born 1983), German footballer
- Dennis Bulli (born 1987), Jamaican cricketer
- Dennis Burgess (1926–1980), British actor
- Dennis K. Burke, American lawyer
- Dennis Burkley (1945–2013), American actor
- Dennis Burnett (born 1944), English footballer
- Dennis Burns (1898–1969), American baseball player
- Dennis Burtt (born 1957), American baseball player
- Dennis Buschening (born 1991), German-Thai professional footballer
- Dennis Bush, American politician
- Dennis M. Bushnell, NASA scientist
- Dennis Bushyhead (1826–1898), Cherokee leader
- Dennis D. Buss (1942–2018), American electrical engineer
- Dennis Butler (born 1943), English footballer
- Dennis Butler (born 1944), English football player and manager
- Dennis E. Butler (born 1940), American politician
- Dennis Byars (1940–2022), American politician
- Dennis Byatt (born 1958), English footballer
- Dennis Byng (1927–2008), American painter and professor
- Dennis Byrd (1946–2010), American football player
- Dennis Byrd (1966–2016), American football player
- Dennis Byron (born 1943), Saint Kitts and Nevis judge
- Dennis Bythewood, United States Space Force general
- Dennis Cagara (born 1985), Danish footballer
- Dennis Cahill, Irish priest
- Dennis Cahill (musician) (1954–2022), American guitarist
- Dennis Cakebread, English athlete
- Dennis Calero (born 1972), American artist and illustrator
- Dennis Callahan (1941–2012), American politician
- Dennis Callan (1932–2006), Welsh footballer
- Dennis Cambal (1949–2018), American football player
- Dennis Cambell (1907–2000), British admiral
- Dennis Canario (born 1960), American politician
- Dennis Canavan (born 1942), Scottish politician
- Dennis Cardoza (born 1959), American politician
- Dennis Carpenter (1928–2003), American politician
- Dennis Carroll (born 1960), Australian rules footballer
- Dennis A. Carson, American physician and hematologist
- Dennis Carvalho (1947–2026), Brazilian director, actor and voice actor
- Dennis Caryl (born 1942), American football coach
- Dennis Castillo (born 1993), Costa Rican footballer
- Dennis M. Cavanaugh (born 1947), American judge
- Dennis O. Cawthorne (born 1940), American politician
- Dennis Ceylan (born 1989), Danish boxer
- Dennis Chalker (born 1954), US Navy SEAL and author
- Dennis Chamberland, American bioengineer
- Dennis Chambers (born 1959), American drummer
- Dennis Charlton, New Zealand footballer
- Dennis S. Charney (born 1951), American medical researcher
- Dennis Chávez (1888–1962), American politician
- Dennis Chembezi (born 1997), Malawian footballer
- Dennis Cheng, American development executive
- Dennis K. Chesney, American astronomer
- Dennis Chessa (born 1992), German footballer
- Dennis Chew (born 1973), Singaporean media personality
- Dennis Chin (born 1987), Jamaican footballer
- Dennis Chinnery (1927–2012), British actor
- Dennis Chitty (1912–2010), Canadian zoologist
- Dennis Choi, American neurologist
- Dennis Cholowski (born 1998), Canadian ice hockey player
- Dennis H. Chookaszian, American businessman
- Dennis Christopher (born 1950), American actor
- Dennis Christu (born 1989), Greek-Czech footballer
- Dennis Chun (born 1952), American actor
- Dennis Chung (born 2001), Filipino footballer
- Dennis di Cicco, American astronomer
- Dennis Cirkin (born 2002), English footballer
- Dennis Claridge (1941–2018), American football player
- Dennis Clarke (born 1948), English footballer
- Dennis Claude (c. 1782–1863), American politician
- Dennis Clerkin, American bridge player
- Dennis Clifford (born 1992), American basketball player
- Dennis Clontz (1951–2004), American journalist
- Dennis Coates (born 1953), British middle-distance runner
- Dennis Cochran (1921–1944), Royal Air Force officer
- Dennis Cochrane (born 1950), Canadian politician
- Dennis Cocke (1924–2008), Canadian politician
- Dennis Cockrum, American actor
- Dennis Coenen (born 1991), Belgian cyclist
- Dennis de Coetlogon, 18th-century French medical doctor
- Dennis Coffey (born 1940), American guitarist
- Dennis Cohoon (born 1953), American politician
- Dennis Coi (1961–1987), Canadian figure skater
- Dennis Coke (born 1993), Jamaican badminton player
- Dennis Cole (1940–2009), American actor
- Dennis Coleman (born 1948), American football player
- Dennis Coles (born 1970), American rapper known as Ghostface Killah
- Dennis Collander (born 2002), Swedish footballer
- Dennis Colleran (born 2003), American baseball player
- Dennis Comeau, American fashion designer
- Dennis Cometti (1949–2026), Australian sports commentator, player and coach
- Dennis Condrey (born 1952), American professional wrestler
- Dennis Conlan (1838–1870), American soldier
- Dennis Conner (born 1942), American yachtsman
- Dennis Connors (born 1985), American Para-cyclist
- Dennis Considen, Irish-born surgeon
- Dennis Constable (1925–2011), English cricketer
- Dennis Conta (born 1940), American politician and consultant
- D. D. Conway (1868–1926), American politician
- Dennis Cook (born 1962), American baseball player
- Dennis Cooley, Canadian writer and professor
- Dennis Coombe (1911–1979), New Zealand tennis player
- Dennis Cooper (born 1953), American writer
- Dennis Copperwheat (1914–1992), George Cross recipient in World War II
- Dennis Copps (1929–2020), New Zealand cricket umpire
- Dennis Coralluzzo (1953–2001), American wrestling promoter
- Dennis Corrigan (born 1944), American illustrator
- Dennis Coslett (1939–2004), Welsh political activist
- Dennis Coughlin (1844–1913), American baseball player
- Dennis Coughlin (footballer) (born 1937), English footballer
- Dennis Covington (1948–2024), American author
- Dennis Cowals (1945–2004), American photographer
- Dennis Cox (1925–2001), English cricketer and cricket administrator
- Dennis Craig, American academic administrator
- Dennis Crall, United States Marine Corps general
- Dennis Crane (1945–2003), American football player
- Dennis Creehan (born 1949), American gridiron football coach
- Dennis Creffield (1931–2018), British artist
- Dennis Crompton (1935–2025), English architect
- Dennis Crompton (footballer) (1942–2015), English footballer
- Dennis Cronin (born 1967), English footballer
- Dennis Crookes (born 1931), South African cricketer and businessman
- Dennis Crosby (1934–1991), American singer and actor
- Dennis Cross (1924–1991), American film and television actor
- Dennis Crouch (born 1975), American legal scholar
- Dennis Crouch (bassist) (born 1967), American bassist
- Dennis Crowley (born 1976), American internet entrepreneur
- Dennis Cruz (born 1983), Spanish DJ and record producer
- Dennis Culp (born 1970), American musician
- Dennis Cunningham (1936–2022), American civil rights lawyer
- Dennis Curatolo (born 2004), Italian footballer
- Dennis Curling, Welsh rugby union and rugby league footballer
- Dennis P. Curran (born 1953), American organic chemist
- Dennis Currier, American college soccer coach
- Dennis Cusick, Native American painter
- Dennis Cutts (born 1968), American basketball coach
- Dennis Daa (born 1979), Filipino basketball player
- Dennis Daley (born 1996), American football player
- Dennis Damon (born 1948), American politician
- Dennis Danell (1961–2000), guitarist with the band Social Distortion
- Dennis Daniel, American actor
- Dennis B. Danielson, American politician
- Dennis Danvers, American novelist
- Dennis Darling (born 1975), Bahamian athlete
- Dennis Daube (born 1989), German footballer
- Dennis Dauda (born 1988), Zimbabwean footballer
- Dennis Daudi Afande (1937–2021), Kenyan diplomat
- Dennis Daugaard (born 1953), American politician
- Dennis Dauttmam (1964–2025), Brazilian politician
- Dennis David (1918–2000), British World War II flying ace
- Dennis Russell Davies (born 1944), American conductor and pianist
- Dennis Dawson (born 1949), Canadian politician
- Dennis Day (1916–1988), American actor, comedian and singer
- Dennis Day (artist), Canadian artist
- Dennis Day (Mouseketeer) (1942–2018), American murder victim
- Dennis Harold De Jong (1931–2003), Zambian Roman Catholic priest
- Dennis Dease (born 1943), American university president
- Dennis DeBar (born 1971), American politician
- Dennis DeBarr (born 1953), American baseball player
- Dennis DeConcini (born 1937), American lawyer and politician
- Dennis Deer (1972–2024), American politician
- Dennis Del Favero, Australian artist and academic
- Dennis Del Valle (born 1989), Puerto Rican male volleyball player
- Dennis Delane (1694–1750), Irish actor
- Dennis Delaney (born 1953), American writer
- Dennis Deletant (born 1946), British-Romanian historian
- Dennis Delgado, American visual artist and critic
- Dennis Dellwo (born 1945), American politician
- Dennis Demmers (born 1975), Dutch footballer and coach
- Dennis Dengering (born 1993), Dutch professional football player
- Dennis Denisoff, Canadian author, poet and scholar
- Dennis Dennehy, Irish political activist
- Dennis Denora (1951–2018), Filipino journalist and publisher
- Dennis DeShazer (born 1963), American producer
- Dennis E. Desjardin (born 1950), American mycologist
- Dennis Desrosiers (born 1949), Canadian ice hockey player and coach
- Dennis DeTurck (born 1954), American mathematician
- Dennis Detwiller (born 1972), American game designer
- Dennis DeVaughn (born 1960), American football player
- Dennis Devereux, American politician
- Dennis Dewane, American politician
- Dennis DeYoung (born 1947), lead singer and keyboardist for pop music group Styx
- Dennis Diekmeier (born 1989), German footballer
- Dennis Dieks (born 1949), Dutch physicist and philosopher
- Dennis Diken (born 1957), American DJ and record producer
- Dennis Anthony Dillon (born 1959), American minister, journalist, publisher and community activist
- Dennis Dioukarev (born 1993), Swedish politician
- Dennis Dixon (born 1985), American football player
- Dennis Dobson (1919–1978), British book publisher
- Dennis Donahue (born 1944), American biathlete
- Dennis C. Donaldson (1938–2024), American politician
- Dennis Donnini (1925–1945), British soldier and Victoria Cross recipient
- Dennis Dottin-Carter (born 1981), American football player
- Dennis Douds (born 1941), American football player and coach
- Dennis Dourandi (born 1983), Cameroonian footballer
- Dennis Dove (born 1981), American baseball player
- Dennis Dowidat (born 1990), German footballer
- Dennis Dowouna (born 2000), Ghanaian footballer
- Dennis Drainville (born 1954), Canadian politician
- Dennis Drayna, American geneticist
- Dennis Dressel (born 1998), German footballer
- Dennis Drew (born 1957), American musician
- Dennis Drinkwater, American businessman
- Dennis Driscoll (1862–1901), American baseball player
- Dennis Droomers (born 1980), Dutch vocalist
- Dennis Dugan (born 1946), American actor and film director
- Dennis Duigan (1902–1962), Australian decathlete
- Dennis Dullnig, Swiss professional wrestler
- Dennis Dun (born 1952), American actor
- Dennis Dunaway (born 1946), American musician
- Dennis Duncan (1943–2014), American gridiron football player
- Dennis Vincent Durning (1923–2002), American Catholic missionary
- Dennis Dutko (1943–1990), American politician
- Dennis L. Dutremble (born 1947), American politician
- Dennis DuVal (born 1952), American basketball player
- Dennis Dyer (1914–1990), South African cricketer
- Dennis Eadie (1875–1928), British stage actor
- Dennis Eagan (1926–2012), British field hockey player
- Dennis East (1949–2022), South African songwriter and musical producer
- Dennis Wayne Eaton (1957–1998), American convicted mass murderer
- Dennis Eberhard, American composer
- Dennis E. Eckart (born 1950), American lawyer and politician
- Dennis Eckersley (born 1954), American baseball player
- Dennis Eckert (born 1997), German footballer
- Dennis Eckhoff (1945–1995), American football player
- Dennis Ede (1931–2021), archdeacon of Stoke
- Dennis Edlund (born 1965), Swedish professional golfer
- Dennis Edney (1946–2023), Canadian lawyer
- Dennis Egan (1947–2022), American politician
- Dennis Eichhorn (1945–2015), American writer
- Dennis Eilhoff (born 1982), German footballer
- Dennis Elliott (born 1950), British musician and artist
- Dennis Elsas (born 1948), American disc jockey and voiceover artist
- Dennis Emery (1933–1986), English footballer
- Dennis Endras (born 1985), German ice hockey goaltender
- Dennis Engel (born 1995), German footballer
- Dennis Engelman (born 1995), German footballer
- Dennis vanEngelsdorp (born 1969), American entomologist
- D. J. Enright (1920–2002), British academic, poet, novelist and critic
- Dennis Epple, American economist
- Dennis Erdmann (born 1990), German footballer
- Dennis Erickson (born 1947), American football head coach
- Dennis Espino (born 1973), Filipino basketball player
- Dennis Esposito (born 1988), Italian footballer
- Dennis Etchison (1943–2019), American writer
- Dennis Eveland (born 1952), American guitarist
- Dennis G. Eveleigh (born 1947), American judge
- Dennis Everberg (born 1991), Swedish ice hockey player

=== F–K ===
- Dennis Fadeski (born 1977), American soccer player
- Dennis Fakudze (born 1983), Swazi footballer
- Dennis H. Farber (1946–2017), American painter
- Dennis Farina (1944–2013), American character actor
- Dennis Farnon (1923–2019), Canadian composer
- Dennis Farr (1929–2006), British art historian and curator
- Dennis Feickert (born 1948), American politician
- Dennis Feldman, American film producer
- Dennis Felton (born 1963), American basketball coach
- Dennis Fentie (1950–2019), Canadian politician
- Dennis Fenton (1888–1954), American sport shooter
- Dennis Ferguson (1948–c. 2012), Australian sex offender
- Dennis Ferguson (politician) (born 1961), American politician
- Dennis Fernández (born 1986), Cuban triple jumper
- Dennis Ferrer (born 1970), American DJ and record producer
- Dennis Ferrera (born 1980), Honduran footballer
- Dennis Fidler (1938–2015), English footballer
- Dennis Field, British bobsledder
- Dennis Fields (born 1945), American politician
- Dennis Filmer (1916–1981), Malawian sports shooter
- Dennis Fimple (1940–2002), American actor
- Dennis Firestone (born 1944), Australian CART driver
- Dennis Fitzgerald (1936–2001), American freestyle wrestler
- Dennis Fitzgerald (baseball) (1865–1936), English baseball player
- Dennis D. Fitzgerald (1943–2008), first Principal Deputy Director
- Daniel Fitzpatrick, British administrator in India
- Dennis Flanagan (1919–2005), American editor
- Dennis Flanders (1915–1994), British artist
- Dennis Flannigan (1939–2024), American politician
- Dennis Flemion (1955–2012), American musician
- Dennis Flinta (born 1983), Danish footballer
- Dennis Flydtkjær (born 1978), Danish politician
- Dennis Flynn (Canadian politician) (1923–2003), Canadian politician
- Dennis J. Flynn (born 1942), American judge
- Dennis Thomas Flynn (1861–1939), American lawyer
- Dennis Foggia (born 2001), Italian motorcycle rider
- Dennis Foley, American novelist
- Dennis Fong (born 1977), American businessperson
- Dennis Foon (born 1951), Canadian playwright, producer, screenwriter and novelist
- Dennis Ford (1931–2009), South African swimmer
- Dennis Henry Forsdick (1924–2016), British physician
- Dennis Fowles (born 1951), Welsh runner
- Dennis Fowlkes (born 1961), American football player
- Dennis Franchione (born 1951), American football coach
- Dennis Franklin (born 1953), American football player
- Dennis Franks (1953–2021), American football player
- Dennis Franz (born 1944), American actor
- Dennis Franzin (born 1993), German footballer
- Dennis Frederickson (born 1939), American politician
- Dennis C. Frederickson (1931–2017), American politician and businessman
- Dennis Frederiksen (1951–2014), American singer
- Dennis Freedman, Australian writer and satirist
- Dennis Fry (1907–1983), British linguist
- Dennis Fryzel (1942–2009), American football player and coach
- Dennis Fujii (born 1949), United States Army soldier
- Dennis B. Funa, Filipino lawyer, businessman, public official, law book author, professor of law, constitutionalist, and the current Commissioner of the Philippines' Insurance Commission
- Dennis Furlong (1945–2018), Canadian politician
- Dennis Gabor (1900–1979), Hungarian electrical engineer and inventor
- Dennis Gabryszak (born 1951), American politician
- Dennis Gadbois (born 1963), American football player
- Dennis Gaitsgory (born 1973), Israeli-American mathematician
- Dennis Galabuzi Ssozi, Ugandan civil engineer, politician and businessman
- Dennis P. Gallon, American academic
- Dennis Gamsy (born 1940), South African cricketer
- Dennis Ganendra, Malaysian civil servant and business executive
- Dennis Gansel (born 1973), German film director
- Dennis Gardeck (born 1994), American football player
- Dennis Gassner (born 1948), American-Canadian production designer
- Dennis Gastmann, German reporter and television presenter
- Dennis Gates (born 1980), American basketball coach
- Dennis Gaubatz (born 1940), American football player
- Dennis Geary (1831–1882), American politician
- Dennis van der Geest (born 1975), Dutch judoka
- Dennis Gentenaar (born 1975), Dutch footballer
- Dennis Gentry (born 1959), American football player
- Dennis George (born 1983), West Indian cricketer
- Dennis Gersten, American dramatist
- Dennis Giangreco, American author
- Dennis Giannini (born 1950), Canadian ice hockey player
- Dennis Gilchrist (born 1936), American baseball player
- Dennis Gildea (1898–1976), American football player
- Dennis Gile (born 1981), American football player
- Dennis Gillespie (1936–2001), Scottish footballer
- Dennis Gilligan (1931–2019), British wrestler
- Dennis Gillings (born 1944), British-born American billionaire statistician and entrepreneur
- Dennis Gjengaar (born 2004), Norwegian footballer
- Dennis Gladiator (born 1981), German politician
- Dennis R. Glass, American businessman
- Dennis Glover, Australian writer
- Dennis Golden, American football coach
- Dennis Gonsalves, American phytopathologist
- Dennis González (1954–2022), American jazz musician, poet and visual artist
- Dennis Good (1926–2021), English cricketer
- Dennis Goodwin (1929–2011), English rugby league footballer
- Dennis Goossens (born 1993), Belgian artistic gymnast
- Dennis Gordon (footballer) (1924–1998), English footballer
- Dennis Gordon (politician), Jamaican politician
- Dennis Gorski (1944–2021), American politician
- Dennis Gorsline (born 1943), American football player
- Dennis Goulden, Canadian documentarian
- Dennis Grabosch (born 1978), German actor
- Dennis Grady (1886–1974), American football, basketball and baseball coach
- Dennis Graham (1896–1967), American baseball player
- Dennis Grainger (1920–1986), English footballer
- Dennis Grassow (born 1971), German footballer
- Dennis Gratton (1934–2016), English footballer
- Dennis Gratz (born 1978), Bosnian lawyer and politician
- Dennis Gray, British mountain climber
- Dennis Gray (speedway rider) (1929–2021), British motorcycle speedway rider
- Dennis Greenhouse (born 1950), American politician
- Dennis Greenland (1930–2012), British soil scientist
- Dennis Grey (born 1947), American basketball player
- Dennis Griffin, American academic administrator
- Dennis Griffiths (1933–2015), British journalist and historian
- Dennis Griffiths (footballer) (1935–2005), Welsh footballer
- Dennis Grimaldi, American theatrical producer
- Dennis Grote (born 1986), German footballer
- Dennis Gruending (born 1948), Canadian politician
- Dennis Gruenling, American musical artist
- Dennis Gustafsson (born 1972), Swedish bandy player
- Dennis Guth, American politician
- Dennis Guy (1944–2022), Northern Irish footballer
- Dennis Gyamfi (born 2001), Dutch footballer
- Dennis Gyllensporre (born 1964), Swedish Army officer
- Dennis Hackett (1929–2016), British newspaper editor
- Dennis Hackin, American screenwriter
- Dennis Hadley Currie (1874–1928), United States military officer
- Dennis Hadžikadunić (born 1998), Bosnian footballer
- Dennis Haley (born 1982), American gridiron football player
- Dennis C. Haley (1893–1966), president of Suffolk University
- Dennis Hall (born 1971), American wrestler
- Dennis Hall (footballer) (1923–2005), Australian rules footballer
- Dennis Hallman (born 1975), American mixed martial artist
- Dennis Marvin Ham (1941–2019), Canadian businessman and political figure
- Dennis Hamilton (1944–2012), American basketball player
- Dennis Hammer, American television producer
- Dennis Hammond (1819–1891), American politician
- Dennis B. Hankins (born 1959), American diplomat
- Dennis Hapugalle (1930–2000), Sri Lankan Sinhala army brigadier
- Dennis Harbour (born 1961), English darts player
- Dennis Harding (born 1940), British archaeologist and academic
- Dennis Hardman (born 1943), Zimbabwean sports shooter
- Dennis Hare, Californian artist
- Dennis Harper, American educator
- Dennis Harper (footballer) (born 1936), English footballer
- Dennis Harrah (born 1953), American football player
- Dennis Harrison (born 1956), American football player
- Dennis J. Harte (1866–1917), American politician
- Dennis Hartley (1936–2019), English rugby league footballer
- Dennis L. Hartmann, American atmospheric scientist
- Dennis Haskell, Australian poet, critic and academic
- Dennis Haskins (born 1950), American actor
- Dennis Hastert (1942–2026), American politician
- Dennis Hatcher (1953–2024), Australian rower
- Dennis Hatsell (1930–1998), English footballer
- Dennis Haueisen (born 1978), German cyclist
- Dennis Hauger (born 2003), Norwegian racing driver
- Dennis Haugh (1883–1959), Irish boxer
- Dennis Haustein (born 1990), German politician
- Dennis Havig (born 1949), American football player
- Dennis Havrilla (born 1987), American football player
- Dennis Hawker (1921–2003), British bishop
- Dennis Hawkins (born 1947), Welsh footballer
- Dennis Hay (1949–2025), British field hockey player
- Dennis K. Hays (born 1953), American diplomat
- Dennis Haysbert (born 1954), American actor
- Dennis Hayslett, American conductor
- Dennis Walter Hearne, American diplomat
- Dennis Heath (1934–2006), English footballer and manager
- Dennis Heaton, Canadian screenwriter
- Dennis Hediger (born 1986), Swiss footballer
- Dennis Hedke (born 1952), American politician
- Dennis H. Heeke (1927–2009), American politician
- Dennis van der Heijden (born 1997), Dutch footballer
- Dennis Hejhal (born 1948), American mathematician
- Dennis Hejlik, United States Marine Corps general
- Dennis Helmich (born 1991), German politician
- Dennis Hennig (1951–1993), Australian pianist
- Dennis Herbert, 1st Baron Hemingford (1869–1947), British Conservative politician
- Dennis Herbert, 2nd Baron Hemingford (1904–1982), British peer
- Dennis Hernandez (born 1984), Filipino politician
- Dennis Herod (1923–2009), English footballer
- Dennis Herrera, American attorney
- Dennis Herrick (born 1952), Puerto Rican wrestler
- Dennis Herring, American record producer
- Dennis Hertel (born 1948), American politician
- Dennis Hess (born 1947), American chemical engineer
- Dennis P. Hession, American attorney and adjunct professor
- Dennis Hettinga (born 1995), Dutch footballer
- Dennis Heussner (1943–2012), Australian canoeist
- Dennis Hextall (born 1943), Canadian ice hockey player
- Dennis Heywood (1852–1936), Welsh footballer
- Dennis Higgins (1939–2023), American baseball player
- Dennis Higgins (footballer) (1915–1942), English footballer
- Dennis Hightower (born 1941), American government official
- Dennis Hildeby (born 2001), Swedish ice hockey player
- Dennis Hill (1929–2020), English footballer
- Dennis Hillebrand (born 1979), German footballer and manager
- Dennis Hillman (1918–1994), English footballer
- Dennis Hillman (weightlifter) (born 1933), British weightlifter
- Dennis Hisey, American politician
- Dennis Robert Hoagland (1884–1949), American plant scientist
- Dennis Hodgetts (1863–1945), English footballer
- Dennis Høegh (born 1989), Danish footballer
- Dennis Hoey (1893–1960), English actor
- Dennis Hof (1946–2018), American businessman and politician
- Dennis Hogan (sociologist), American sociologist
- Dennis Hogan (boxer) (born 1985), Irish boxer
- D. J. Hogg (born 1996), American basketball player
- Dennis Hoggart (born 1939), Scottish footballer
- Dennis Hohloch (born 1991), German politician
- Dennis Holahan (born 1942), American attorney and academic
- Dennis Holdren (born 1965), American racing driver
- Dennis Hollart (born 1983), Dutch footballer
- Dennis Hollingsworth (born 1967), American politician
- Dennis Holmberg (born 1951), American baseball player and manager
- Dennis Holmes (born 1950), American film and television actor
- Dennis Holt (born 1942), American poet, linguist and translator
- Dennis Holt (born 1958), American drummer, percussionist, and singer
- Dennis H. Holtschneider (born 1962), American academic administrator
- Dennis Homan (born 1946), American football player
- Dennis Hong, American roboticist
- Dennis Hood (born 1970), Australian politician
- Dennis Hopeless, American comic book writer
- Dennis Hopper (1936–2010), American actor, filmmaker and artist
- Dennis Hopson (born 1965), American basketball player
- Dennis Horlander, American politician
- Dennis Horn (1909–1974), English track cyclist
- Dennis Morton Horne (1920–2015), English chess player
- Dennis Horner (born 1988), American basketball player
- Dennis Horner (rugby league) (1924–1978), English rugby league footballer
- D. J. Houlton (born 1979), American baseball player
- Dennis Housden (born 1953), English footballer
- Dennis Houston (born 1999), American football player
- Dennis Howard (born 1954), American politician
- Dennis Howitt (born 1945), British psychologist
- Dennis Hull (born 1944), Canadian ice hockey player
- Dennis Huntley (1928–2021), British artist
- Dennis P. Hupchick (born 1948), American historian
- Dennis Hutter, American basketball coach
- Dennis Hwang, South Korean graphic artist
- Dennis Iapichino (born 1990), Swiss footballer
- Dennis Ibrahim (born 1974), German footballer
- Dennis Ichiyama, American graphic designer
- Dennis Idahosa (born 1980), Nigerian politician
- Dennis Iliadis (born 1969), Greek film director
- Dennis Iliohan (born 1972), Dutch footballer
- Dennis Ireland (born 1954), New Zealand motorcycle racer
- Dennis Irwin (1951–2008), American jazz double bassist
- Dennis Itumbi (born 1985), Kenyan political strategist
- Dennis Iverson (born 1981), Australian Olympic judoka
- Dennis Iverson (politician) (born 1943), American politician
- Dennis Izon (1907–1967), English footballer
- Dennis Jackson (1932–2014), English footballer
- Dennis K. Jackson (born 1946), United States Army general
- Dennis Jacobs (born 1944), American judge
- Dennis Jahn (born 1992), German politician
- Dennis Janke (born 1950), American comic book artist
- Dennis Janssen (born 1992), Dutch footballer
- Dennis Jastrzembski (born 2000), German footballer
- Dennis Jeans (1934–2020), British-born Australian geographer
- Dennis Jenkerson (born 1957), American fire commissioner
- Dennis Jenkins, American archaeologist
- Dennis Jenkins (footballer) (born 1947), Australian rules footballer
- Dennis Jernigan (born 1959), American musician
- Dennis C. Jett (born 1945), American diplomat
- Dennis Joel (1947–2006), American former child actor and singer
- Dennis Johnsen (born 1998), Norwegian footballer
- Dennis de Jong (born 1955), Dutch politician
- Dennis Jonsson (born 1983), Swedish football defender
- Dennis Jonsson (speedway rider) (born 1991), Swedish speedway rider
- Dennis Joseph (1957–2021), Malayalam scriptwriter and director
- Dennis Junk (born 1984), German politician
- Dennis Jürgensen, Danish writer
- Dennis Kaars (born 1988), Dutch footballer
- Dennis Kamakahi (1953–2014), Hawaiian musician
- Dennis Kardon, American painter
- Dennis Karjala (1939–2017), American law professor
- Dennis Kasper (born 1943), American microbiologist
- Dennis Kassian (born 1941), Canadian ice hockey player
- Dennis Kasumba (born 2003), Ugandan baseball player
- Dennis Katunarich (born 1950), Australian lawn bowler
- Dennis Kavanagh (born 1941), British political analyst
- Dennis Kay (1948–2007), New Zealand cricketer
- Dennis Kaygin (born 2004), Turkish footballer
- Dennis Kayser, American football coach
- Dennis J. Kearney (born 1949), American politician
- Dennis Kearns (born 1945), Canadian ice hockey player
- Dennis Keating (born 1940), Irish footballer
- Dennis Keene (born 1965), American politician
- Dennis Keeney (born 1937), American scientist
- Dennis Kelleher (1918–2002), Irish footballer
- Dennis Kemp (born 1946), American gridiron footballer
- Dennis Kemp (field hockey) (1931–2023), Australian field hockey player
- Dennis Kempe (born 1986), German footballer
- Dennis Kenney, American singer, actor, wardrobe stylist, creative director, fashion designer and educator
- Dennis Kent, American geologist and geophysicist
- Dennis Key (born 1947), New Zealand rugby league footballer
- Dennis Keyes (born 1985), American football player
- Dennis Kim, Canadian violinist
- Dennis Kimberly (1790–1862), American politician
- Dennis Kipruto Kimetto (born 1984), Kenyan long-distance runner
- Dennis Kincaid (1905–1937), British civil servant and novelist
- Dennis F. Kinlaw (1922–2017), American biblical scholar
- Dennis Kinney (born 1952), American baseball player
- Dennis T. Kirby (1835–1922), American Civil War recipient of the Medal of Honor
- Dennis H. Klatt (1938–1988), American researcher
- Dennis Klecker (born 1990), German politician
- Dennis Raymond Knapp (1912–1998), American judge
- Dennis Kohlruss (born 1988), German strongman
- Dennis Konuszewski (born 1971), American baseball player
- Dennis Koslowski (born 1959), American wrestler
- Dennis Kozlowski (born 1946), American businessman
- Dennis Kramer (1992–2023), German-American basketball player
- Dennis Kriegshauser, American politician
- Dennis Krull, American politician
- Dennis Kruppke (born 1980), German footballer
- Dennis Kruse (born 1946), American politician
- Dennis Kuchar (1956–2022), Australian cardiologist
- Dennis Kucinich (born 1946), American politician
- Dennis J. Kuester, American businessman
- Dennis Kuipers (born 1985), Dutch rally driver
- Dennis Kutrieb (born 1979), German football manager
- Dennis Kwok (born 1978), Hong Kong former politician

=== L–R ===
- Dennis van de Laar (born 1994), Dutch racing driver
- Dennis LaBounty, American politician
- Dennis Lacey (1919–1942), South African flying ace
- Dennis Lajola (born 1989), American tennis player
- Dennis Lake (born 1937), American politician
- Dennis Lam (born 1959), Hong Kong ophthalmologist, businessman and politician
- Dennis Lambert, American record producer
- Dennis Lambourne (born 1945), Welsh association football player
- Dennis Lamp (born 1952), American baseball player
- Dennis Lander (born 1993), German politician
- Dennis Landgraf (born 2001), German politician
- Dennis Landolt (born 1986), American football player
- Dennis Lane (1881–1942), American trade unionist
- Dennis Larsen, Danish rower
- Dennis R. Larsen, United States Air Force general
- Dennis LaRue (born 1959), American ice hockey official
- Dennis Latimer (1895–1976), British flying ace
- Dennis Latos (born 1992), American film director
- Dennis Lattimer (1946–2025), New Zealand mural artist and illustrator
- Dennis Lau (born 1985), Malaysian electric violinist
- Dennis Laurente (born 1977), Filipino boxer
- Dennis Lauscha, American sports executive
- Dennis Le Gassick (born 1947), Australian rules footballer
- Dennis Leary, American restaurateur and chef
- Dennis Leech (born 1943), British racing driver
- Dennis Leeflang (born 1979), Dutch rock drummer
- Dennis Lees (1924–2008), British economist
- Dennis Leh (born 1946), American politician
- Dennis Lehane (born 1965), American novelist
- Dennis Leman (born 1954), English footballer
- Dennis Lemke (born 1989), German footballer
- Dennis Lemma (born 1971), American law enforcement
- Dennis Lennon (1918–1991), British architect and interior designer
- Dennis Lens (born 1977), Dutch badminton player
- Dennis Lenz, American politician
- Dennis deLeon (1948–2009), American lawyer, activist and community leader
- Dennis Leston (1917–1981), English entomologist
- Dennis P. Lettenmaier, American hydrologist
- Dennis Letts (1934–2008), American actor
- Dennis Leung (born 1973), Hong Kong politician
- Dennis M. Levi, South African optometrist
- Dennis Levine (born 1952), American investor and white-collar criminal
- Dennis Lewallyn (born 1953), American baseball player
- Dennis Lewis, American spiritual writer
- Dennis Lewis (footballer) (1925–1996), Welsh footballer
- Dennis Leyckes (born 1982), German decathlete
- Dennis Licht (born 1984), Dutch athlete
- Dennis Lick (born 1954), American football player
- Dennis Liddiard, American make-up artist
- Dennis Lightfoot (born 1962), English cyclist
- Dennis Lillee (born 1949), Australian cricketer
- Dennis Lillie (1945–2022), Australian cricketer
- Dennis Lim (footballer), Singaporean footballer
- Dennis K.J. Lin, Taiwanese-American statistician
- Dennis Lind (born 1993), Danish racing driver
- Dennis Linde (1943–2006), American songwriter
- Dennis Lindley (1923–2013), British statistician
- Dennis Lindsey (born 1969), American basketball executive
- Dennis Lindskjold (born 1977), Danish darts player
- Dennis Linthicum, American politician
- Dennis C. Liotta, American chemist
- Dennis Lippert (born 1996), German footballer
- Dennis Lipscomb (1942–2014), American actor
- Dennis Lisk (born 1977), German rapper known as Denyo
- Dennis List (1946–2007), New Zealand writer
- Dennis Lister, Bermudian politician
- Dennis Littlejohn (born 1954), American baseball player
- Dennis Liwewe (1936–2014), Zambian football commentator
- Dennis Lo (born 1963), Hong Kong molecular biologist
- Dennis Lock (born 1950), English cricketer
- Dennis Locorriere (born 1949), American musician
- Dennis Löfqvist (born 1967), Swedish speedway rider
- Dennis Lonergan (1906–1965), Australian politician
- Dennis Longhorn (born 1950), English footballer
- Dennis Looze (born 1972), Dutch triathlete
- Dennis López (born 1986), Honduran-born Guatemalan international footballer
- Dennis Lota (1973–2014), Zambian footballer
- Dennis Lotis (1925–2023), South African-born British singer, actor and entertainer
- Dennis Lukens (born 1952), American soccer coach
- Dennis Lundy (born 1972), American football player
- Dennis Lupu (born 2000), Italian-born Romanian footballer
- Dennis Luyt (born 1963), Dutch retired general
- Dennis Michael Lynch (born 1969), American film producer
- Dennis Lyxzén (born 1972), Swedish musician
- Dennis MacDonald, American theologian
- Dennis MacKay (1942–2024), Canadian politician
- Dennis Mackrel (born 1962), American drummer
- Dennis Madalone (born 1954), American actor
- Dennis Madden (1913–1967), Welsh rugby union and rugby league footballer
- Dennis Maelzer (born 1980), German politician
- Dennis Hart Mahan (1802–1871), American military theorist, civil engineer and professor
- Dennis Maher, American artist
- Dennis Mahon (born 1950), American right-wing terrorist
- Dennis Mahoney (born 1974), American writer and artist
- Dennis Mahony (1821–1879), American politician
- Dennis Mallonee (born 1955), American comic book writer
- Dennis Malloy, American politician
- Dennis Malura (born 1984), German footballer
- Dennis Man (born 1998), Romanian footballer
- Dennis Mangers (born 1940), American politician
- Dennis Mannion, American sports executive
- Dennis Mannion (politician), American politician
- Dennis Manteit (born 1943), Australian rugby league footballer
- Dennis Mapa (born 1969), Filipino economist and statistician
- Dennis Marcellino (1948–2022), American musician
- Dennis Marineau (born 1962), Canadian bobsledder
- Dennis Marriott (1939–2014), English cricketer
- Dennis Marschall (born 1996), German racing driver
- Dennis Marsh (born 1951), New Zealand singer
- Dennis Martin (born 1947), Scottish footballer
- Dennis Martínez (born 1955), Nicaraguan baseball player
- Dennis Maruk (born 1955), Canadian ice hockey player
- Dennis Masina (born 1982), Liswati footballer
- Dennis Mast (born 1992), German footballer
- Dennis Mathiasen (born 1981), Danish handball player
- Dennis Matthies (born 1946), American academic
- Dennis P. McAuliffe (1922–2012), United States Army brigadier
- Dennis McCann (born 2001), Irish boxer
- Dennis McCauley (born 1985), American ice hockey player
- Dennis McComak (born 1952), American archer
- Dennis McCort, American novelist and translator
- Dennis McCulloch, American football coach
- Dennis McDermott (1922–2003), Canadian trade unionist
- Dennis McDonald (born 1938), American politician
- Dennis McDougal (1947–2025), American author and newspaper journalist
- Dennis McEldowney (1926–2003), New Zealand writer and educator
- Dennis McFarland (born 1949), American novelist and short story writer
- Dennis McGee (1893–1989), American musician
- Dennis V. McGinn (born 1945), American former government official
- Dennis McGrane (born 1962), American ski jumper
- Dennis McGrath (1946–2004), Australian rules footballer
- Dennis McKenna (born 1950), American pharmacognosist
- Dennis L. McKiernan (born 1932), American writer
- Dennis McKinley (born 1976), American football player
- Dennis McKinney (born 1960), American politician
- Dennis McKinnon (born 1961), American football player
- Dennis McKnight (born 1959), American football player
- Dennis McNeil (born 1960), American opera singer
- Dennis Meadows (born 1942), American scientist
- Dennis Meadows (politician) (born 1966), Jamaican politician
- Dennis Melander (born 1983), Swedish footballer
- Dennis Melland, American curler
- Dennis C. Mendiola (born 1980), Northern Mariana Islander politician
- Dennis Mendyk, American football and baseball player
- Dennis Mepham (born 1958), American soccer player
- Dennis Meredith (born 1945), Australian field hockey player
- Dennis Merzel (born 1944), American Buddhist writer
- Dennis Meyer (born 1950), American football player
- D. Michael Quinn (1944–2021), American historian
- Dennis Michie (1870–1898), United States Army officer, football player and coach
- Dennis Milligan (born 1957), American politician
- Dennis Mills (born 1946), Canadian politician
- Dennis Milne (born 1946), Scottish footballer
- Dennis Miloseski, American product designer
- Dennis Milton (1961–2026), American boxer
- Dennis Mimm (born 1983), Austrian footballer
- Dennis Mims (born 1980), American professional basketball player
- Dennis Mitchell (born 1966), American track and field athlete
- Dennis Mizzi (born 1964), Maltese footballer
- Dennis Mochan (born 1935), Scottish footballer and manager
- Dennis Moeller (born 1967), American baseball player
- Dennis Möhring (born 1976), German politician
- Dennis Mojen (born 1993), German actor
- Dennis Momotaro (born 1954), Marshallese businessman and government minister
- Dennis Montali (born 1940), American judge
- Dennis Morin (1946–2012), American entrepreneur and programmer
- Dennis Morrison (born 1951), American football player
- Dennis Mortimer (born 1952), English footballer
- Dennis Mosley (born 1957), American football player
- Dennis Moss (born 1954), American politician
- Dennis Mount (1929–2016), English rower
- Dennis Mueller (born 1940), American economist
- Dennis Mugo, Kenyan actor
- Dennis Muilenburg (born 1964), American businessman, CEO of Boeing
- Dennis Munari (1948–2023), Australian rules footballer
- Dennis Muren (born 1946), American visual effects pioneer
- Dennis Murillo (born 1992), Brazilian footballer
- Dennis Murphree (1886–1949), American politician
- Dennis Musgraves (born 1943), American baseball player
- Dennis Must (1934–2024), American writer
- Dennis M. Nagy (1943–2023), American Air Force lieutenant general
- Dennis Neary (1944–2024), American politician
- Dennis Nehring, American politician
- Dennis Neilson-Terry (1895–1932), British actor and theatre manager
- Dennis Neuman (born 1989), Dutch baseball player
- Dennis Neville, American cartoonist
- Dennis Newall, Scottish football manager
- Dennis Newinski (1944–2009), American politician
- Dennis Ngabirano, Ugandan teacher, psychologist and entrepreneur
- Dennis Ng'ang'a (born 1993), Kenyan footballer
- Dennis Nieblas (born 1990), Spanish footballer
- Dennis Nielsen (born 1947), American colonel and politician
- Dennis Nikrasch (1941–2010), American locksmith
- Dennis Nilsen (1945–2018), Scottish serial killer
- Dennis Nilsson (born 1976), Swedish darts player
- Dennis Nineham (1921–2016), British theologian and academic
- Dennis Nkrumah-Korsah (born 1996), Ghanaian footballer
- Dennis Nnamdi Agbo (born 1964), Nigerian politician
- Dennis Noble (1898–1966), British singer
- Dennis de Nooijer (born 1969), Dutch football player and manager
- Dennis Norfleet (born 1993), American football player
- Dennis Northcutt (born 1977), American football player
- Dennis Novak (born 1993), Austrian tennis player
- Dennis Novikov (born 1993), American tennis player
- Dennis Nurkse (born 1949), American poet
- Dennis Nutt (born 1963), American basketball player and coach
- Dennis Nyback (1953–2022), American film archivist
- Dennis Nyquist (1939–2016), American electrical engineer
- Dennis O'Bryen (1755–1832), Irish dramatist and political pamphleteer
- Dennis J. O'Callaghan (born 1940), American virologist
- Dennis O'Doherty (born 1924), American veteran and politician
- Dennis O'Donnell (1880–?), English footballer
- Dennis J. O'Donovan (died 1982), American Roman Catholic priest
- Dennis O'Driscoll (1954–2012), Irish poet, essayist, critic and editor
- Dennis J. Patrick O'Grady (1943–2012), American politician
- Dennis O'Keefe (1908–1968), American actor
- Dennis O'Keefe (politician) (born 1944), Canadian politician
- Dennis O'Kelly, Irish breeder of thoroughbred racehorses
- Dennis O'Neil (1939–2020), American comic book writer and editor
- Dennis Patrick O'Neil (1940–2003), Roman Catholic bishop
- Dennis O'Rourke (1945–2013), Australian cinematographer
- Dennis O'Toole (born 1949), American baseball player
- Dennis Oakes (born 1946), English cricketer and footballer
- Dennis Oalo (born 1997), Kenyan footballer
- Dennis Odhiambo (born 1985), Kenyan footballer
- Dennis Oehler, American Paralympic athlete
- Dennis Oh (born 1981), American actor and model
- Dennis Okaru (born 1990), Nigerian footballer
- Dennis Okot (born 1990), Ugandan footballer
- Dennis Okoth (born 1982), Kenyan footballer
- Dennis Oli (born 1984), English footballer
- Dennis Oliech (born 1985), Kenyan footballer
- Dennis Olshove (born 1950), American politician
- Dennis Olson, Canadian ice hockey player
- Dennis Olsson (born 1994), Swedish footballer
- Dennis Ombachi (born 1990), Kenyan rugby union player
- Dennis Onkotz (born 1948), American football player
- Dennis Oppenheim (1938–2011), American artist, sculptor and photographer
- Dennis Orcollo (born 1979), Filipino pool player
- Dennis Osadebay (1911–1994), Nigerian politician
- Dennis Osadebe (born 1991), Nigerian artist
- Dennis H. Osborne (1919–2016), British artist and teacher
- Dennis Östlundh (born 1977), Swedish footballer
- Dennis Overbye (born 1944), American astrophysicist
- Dennis Owchar (born 1953), Canadian ice hockey player
- Dennis Owens (born 1960), American football player
- Dennis Ozment (born 1945), American politician
- Dennis Pacey (1928–2009), English footballer
- Dennis Packard (born 1982), American ice hockey player
- Dennis Padilla (born 1962), Filipino actor and comedian
- Dennis Paepke (born 1945), American baseball player
- Dennis Page (1919–2009), British bishop
- Dennis Paoli, screenwriter and playwright
- Dennis Parichy, American lighting designer
- Dennis Parker (born 1950), American football player and coach
- Dennis Parker (speedway rider) (1925–2008), British motorcycle speedway rider
- Dennis F. Parker (1945–2016), American musician and recording engineer
- Dennis Parlato (born 1947), American dancer, actor and singer
- Dennis Parmenter (1950–2020), American politician
- Dennis Parrett (born 1959), American politician
- Dennis Parry (1912–1955), British novelist
- Dennis Partee (born 1946), American football player
- Dennis Patera (born 1945), American football player
- Dennis Patrick (1918–2002), American actor
- Dennis Patterson (born 1948), Canadian politician
- Dennis Patterson (ice hockey) (born 1950), Canadian ice hockey player
- Dennis Paul (fl. 2010s–2020s), American politician
- Dennis Paulson (born 1962), American professional golfer
- Dennis Paustenbach (born 1952), American scientist, businessman, researcher and author
- Dennis Pavao (1951–2002), Hawaiian musician
- Dennis Peacock (born 1953), English footballer
- Dennis Pearce (born 1974), English footballer
- Dennis Pearson (born 1955), American football player
- Dennis Pell (1929–2003), English footballer
- Dennis Pennington (1776–1854), American politician
- Dennis Perju (born 1994), Romanian rugby union football player
- Dennis M. Perluss (born 1948), American judge
- Dennis Peron (1945–2018), American marijuana activist
- Dennis Persson (born 1988), Swedish ice hockey player
- Dennis T. Phalen (1856–1922), American politician
- Dennis Piers (1929–2005), South African cricketer
- Dennis Pili-Gaitau (born 1988), New Zealand rugby union player
- Dennis Pineda (born 1974), Filipino politician and businessman
- Dennis Pitta (born 1985), American football player
- Dennis Politic (born 2000), Romanian footballer
- Dennis Pollard (born 1934), English boxer
- Dennis Polonich (born 1953), Canadian ice hockey player
- Dennis Poore (1916–1987), British racing driver
- Dennis Poppenhagen (born 1938), American politician
- Dennis Postlewhite (born 1957), English footballer
- Dennis Potter (1934–1994), English television dramatist, screenwriter and journalist
- Dennis Powell (born 1963), American baseball player
- Dennis Powell (boxer) (1924–1993), Welsh boxer
- Dennis Powers, American politician
- Dennis Praet (born 1994), Belgian footballer
- Dennis Prager (born 1948), American radio host
- Dennis Preece (1940–1997), American sports coach
- Dennis Preston, Australian rugby league player
- Dennis Price (1915–1973), English actor
- Dennis Price (American football) (born 1965)
- Dennis Priestley (born 1950), English darts player
- Dennis Proctor (1905–1983), British civil servant
- Dennis Provisor (born 1943), American musician
- Dennis Puleston (1905–2001), Anglo-American environmentalist, adventurer and designer
- Dennis E. Puleston (1940–1978), American archaeologist and ecologist
- Dennis Purperhart (born 1969), Surinamese footballer
- Dennis Pursley, American swimming coach
- Dennis Pyle (born 1961), American politician
- Dennis Quaid (born 1954), American actor
- Dennis Quigley (1913–1984), Scottish footballer
- Dennis Rabbitt (born 1956), American serial rapist
- Dennis Rader (born 1945), American serial killer
- Dennis Radtke (born 1979), German politician
- Dennis Raetz (born 1946), American football player and coach
- Dennis Ralston (1942–2020), American tennis player
- Dennis Ram (born 1974), Dutch politician
- Dennis Ramirez (born 2001), American soccer player
- Dennis Rampling (1923–2015), English footballer
- Dennis Randall (1945–2018), American football player
- Dennis Raphael, Canadian sociologist
- Dennis Raven (born 1967), Dutch judoka
- Dennis Rawlins, American astronomer and historian
- Dennis V. Razis (1923–2017), Greek oncologist
- Dennis Rea (born 1957), American musician
- Dennis Reboletti (born 1968), American politician
- Dennis van der Ree (born 1979), Dutch footballer
- Dennis A. Reed (1822–?), American politician
- Dennis Reeves (born 1944), Scottish footballer
- Dennis Regan, American stand-up comedian
- Dennis Reid (1943–2023), Canadian curator and art historian
- Dennis Reimer (born 1939), United States Army general
- Dennis Reksten (born 1949), Norwegian musician
- Dennis Remmert (1938–2020), American football player
- Dennis Retera (born 1986), Dutch racing driver
- Dennis Ribant (1941–2023), American baseball player
- Dennis Riccio, American football and wrestling coach
- Dennis Richards, Canadian politician
- Dennis Richmond (1943–2025), American news anchor
- Dennis Riddell (born 1956), American politician
- Dennis Ridge (1904–1966), English footballer
- Dennis Riemer (born 1988), German footballer
- Dennis Riggin (1936–2016), Canadian ice hockey player
- Dennis Rijnbeek (born 1972), Dutch swimmer
- Dennis Riley (1943–1999), American classical composer
- Dennis L. Riley (1945–2023), American politician
- Dennis Ritchie (1941–2011), American computer scientist
- Dennis Roach, American politician
- Dennis Roady (born 1983), American YouTube personality
- Dennis Robbins (born 1949), American musician
- Dennis Roch (born 1973), American politician
- Dennis Roddy (born 1954), American journalist
- Dennis Rodman (born 1961), American basketball player
- Dennis Rofe (born 1950), English footballer and manager
- Dennis Rogan, Baron Rogan (born 1942), British politician
- Dennis Rohde (born 1986), German politician
- Dennis Roland (born 1983), American football player
- Dennis Roland (American football coach) (1956–2008)
- Dennis Roldan (born 1956), Filipino actor, basketball player, businessman, politician and convicted kidnapper
- Dennis Rollins, English jazz trombonist
- Dennis Rommedahl (born 1978), Danish footballer
- Dennis Rosa, American politician
- Dennis Rosin (born 1996), German footballer
- Dennis Ross (born 1948), American diplomat and author
- Dennis Ross (politician) (born 1959), American politician
- Dennis Rowland (born 1948), American jazz vocalist
- Dennis Ruffo, Canadian music promoter
- Dennis Ruprecht (born 1999), American politician
- Dennis Russ (born 1992), German footballer
- Dennis Ryder, South African politician

=== S–Z ===
- Dennis Saikkonen (born 1992), Swiss-Finnish ice hockey goaltender
- Dennis Salanović (born 1996), Liechtensteiner footballer
- Dennis Saleebey (1936–2014), American academic
- Dennis Salinas (born 1986), Salvadoran goalkeeper
- Dennis Sanchez, American writer
- Dennis Antonio Sánchez (born 1962), Honduran politician
- Dennis Sanchez (soccer), American soccer coach
- Dennis Sandole (1913–2000), American musician
- Dennis S. Sands, American sound engineer
- Dennis Santana (born 1996), Dominican professional baseball pitcher
- Dennis Sarfate (born 1981), American baseball player
- Dennis Satin (born 1968), German film director and screenwriter
- Dennis Saunders (born 1949), American baseball player
- Dennis Savory (born 1943), British archer
- Dennis Scard (born 1943), English musician
- Dennis van Scheppingen (born 1975), Dutch tennis player
- Dennis Schiller (born 1965), Swedish footballer
- Dennis Schmid (born 1969), American tennis player
- Dennis Schmitt (born 1946), veteran explorer, adventurer and composer
- Dennis Schmitt (footballer) (born 1993), German footballer
- Dennis Schmitz (1937–2019), American poet
- Dennis Schneider (1942–2023), Canadian politician
- Dennis Marion Schnurr (born 1948), American Catholic archbishop
- Dennis Schofield (born 1947), English cricketer
- Dennis Scholes (1928–2016), English rugby league footballer
- Dennis Schröder (born 1993), German basketball player
- Dennis Schulp (born 1978), Dutch footballer
- Dennis W. Schulstad (born 1944), United States Air Force general
- Dennis Schulting, Dutch philosopher
- Dennis Schultz (born 1951), American sprinter
- Dennis W. Sciama (1926–1999), British physicist
- Dennis Seaton (born 1967), English singer
- Dennis Seidenberg (born 1981), German ice hockey player
- Dennis Seimen (born 2005), German footballer
- Dennis Selby (1920–1969), Welsh footballer
- Dennis J. Selkoe (born 1943), American physician
- Dennis Sepp (born 1973), Dutch footballer
- Dennis Șerban (born 1976), Romanian footballer
- Dennis Sergeyev (born 1983), Russian ice hockey player
- Dennis L. Serrette (1940–2024), American politician
- Dennis Setterington (1945–2005), Scottish footballer
- Dennis Setzer (born 1960), American racing driver
- Dennis Shanahan, Australian editor
- Dennis Shasha (born 1955), American computer scientist
- Dennis Shaver, American track and field coach
- Dennis Shaw (born 1947), American football player
- Dennis Shaw (cricketer) (1931–2017), English cricketer
- Dennis Shea (1924–1982), Welsh cricketer
- Dennis J. Shea (1876–1958), American football executive
- Dennis Shedd (born 1953), American judge
- Dennis Shepard (born 1954), American LGBTQ rights activist
- Dennis Shepherd (1926–2006), South African boxer
- Dennis Shere, American author, journalist and lawyer
- Dennis Sherrill (born 1956), American baseball player
- Dennis Shiels (born 1938), Northern Irish footballer
- Dennis Showalter (1942–2019), American historian
- Dennis Shryack (1936–2016), American film producer
- Dennis Shuttleworth (1928–2001), British Army officer, rugby union administrator and England international player
- Dennis Sigalos (born 1959), American speedway rider
- Dennis Siim (born 1976), Danish footballer
- Dennis Silk (1931–2019), English cricketer and educator
- Dennis Silverthorne (1923–2004), British figure skater
- Dennis Simoes, Portuguese theatre actor and female impersonator
- Dennis Simpson (1919–2002), English footballer
- Dennis Simpson (baseball) (1904–1977), American baseball player
- Dennis Sinclair (1931–2011), English footballer
- Dennis Sitali Alibuzwi, Zambian general
- Dennis Siver (born 1979), German martial artist
- Dennis Skillicorn (1959–2009), American executed serial killer
- Dennis Skinner (born 1932), British politician
- Dennis Skotak, American visual effects artist
- Dennis Slamar (born 1994), German footballer
- Dennis Slamon (born 1948), American physician
- Dennis Patrick Slattery, American poet
- Dennis Smalldon (1926–1959), Welsh professional golfer
- Dennis Smarsch (born 1999), German footballer
- Dennis Smelt (1763–1818), American politician
- Dennis Smook, Canadian politician
- Dennis Smylie (1946–2017), American musician
- Dennis Snower (born 1950), American-German economist
- Dennis Sobchuk (born 1954), Canadian ice hockey player
- Dennis Soga (1917–2003), South African cricketer and rugby union player
- Dennis Sommers (1940–2020), American baseball player
- Dennis Sonne (born 1984), German politician
- Dennis Sørensen (born 1981), Danish footballer
- Dennis Sorrell (1940–2019), English footballer
- Dennis Souza (born 1980), Brazilian footballer
- Dennis Spicer (1935–1964), British ventriloquist
- Dennis Spiegel, American lyricist
- Dennis E. Spies (born 1968), American Catholic priest
- Dennis Spooner (1932–1986), British writer
- Dennis Springer (born 1965), American baseball player
- Dennis Sproul (born 1956), American football player
- Dennis Spurgeon (born 1943), American nuclear engineer
- Dennis Srbeny (born 1994), German footballer
- Dennis Stallings (born 1974), American football player
- Dennis Stamp (1946–2017), American professional wrestler
- Dennis Stanford (1943–2019), American archaeologist
- Dennis K. Stanley (1906–1983), American education professor, university administrator and intercollegiate sports coach
- Dennis Stapleton, American politician
- Dennis Stevens (1933–2012), English footballer
- Dennis Stevenson (born 1946), Australian politician
- Dennis Stevenson, Baron Stevenson of Coddenham (born 1945), British businessman
- Dennis Stock (1928–2010), American journalist and photographer
- Dennis Stojković (born 2002), Serbian footballer
- Dennis Stokes (1911–1998), English cricketer
- Dennis Stokoe (1925–2005), English footballer
- Dennis Storer (1932–2007), American rugby and soccer coach
- Dennis Storhøi (born 1960), Norwegian actor
- Dennis Störl (born 1979), German ski jumper
- Dennis E. Stowell (1944–2011), American politician and chemical engineer
- Dennis Strandberg (born 1993), Swedish racing driver
- Dennis Stratton (born 1952), British guitarist
- Dennis Streifel (born 1945), Canadian politician and business agent
- Dennis Strickland (born 1957), American racing driver
- Dennis Strigl (born 1946), American corporate executive
- Dennis Sveum (figure skater), American ice dancer
- Dennis Sveum (ice hockey) (born 1986), Norwegian ice hockey player
- Dennis Swanson (born 1938), American television executive
- Dennis Swilley (born 1955), American football player
- Dennis Szczęsny (born 1993), Polish-German handball player
- Dennis Talbot (born 1954), Australian boxer
- Dennis Talbot (British Army officer) (1908–1994), British Army general
- Dennis Tan (born 1970), Singaporean politician and lawyer
- Dennis Tankersley (born 1979), American baseball player
- Dennis P. Tarnow, American dentist
- Dennis Tedlock (1939–2016), American anthropologist
- Dennis Telgenkamp (born 1987), Dutch footballer
- Dennis Tetteh (born 1995), Ghanaian footballer
- Dennis Thering (born 1984), German politician
- Dennis Therrell (born 1956), American football player
- Dennis Thiessen (born 1961), Canadian wheelchair curler
- Dennis Thomas (born 1953), American football player
- Dennis "Dee Tee" Thomas (1951–2021), founding member of the band Kool & the Gang
- Dennis Thorley (born 1956), English footballer
- Dennis Thrower (1938–2018), English footballer
- Dennis Thurman (born 1956), American football player
- Dennis Timbrell (born 1946), Canadian politician
- Dennis Tindall, New Zealand footballer
- Dennis Tinerino (1945–2010), American bodybuilder
- Dennis Tinnon (born 1988), American basketball player
- Dennis Tippets (born 1938), American politician
- Dennis Tipping (1939–2025), Australian sprinter
- Dennis Tipsword, American politician
- Dennis Tirpak, American climatologist
- Dennis Tito (born 1940), American engineer, multimillionaire and space tourist
- Dennis Tiziani, American professional golfer
- Dennis To (born 1981), Hong Kong martial artist and actor
- Dennis Tobenski (born 1982), American composer
- Dennis Toeppen, American businessman
- Dennis Torchia, American biophysicist
- Dennis Townhill (1925–2008), English organist and composer
- Dennis Trammell (born 1982), American basketball player
- Dennis Trevelyan (1929–2024), British civil servant
- Dennis Trewin (born 1946), Australian statistician
- Dennis Trillo (born 1981), Filipino actor
- Dennis Trott (born 1955), Bermudian sprinter
- Dennis Trotter (1950–2003), English rugby league footballer
- Dennis Trudeau (1948–2025), Canadian journalist
- Dennis True (1988–2025), German politician
- Dennis Tubieron (born 1989), Filipino boxer
- Dennis Tucker (born 1928), British athlete
- Dennis Tueart (born 1949), English footballer
- Dennis Tufano (born 1946), American singer
- Dennis Turner (1942–2014), British politician
- Dennis Tutty (born 1945), Australian rugby league footballer and coach
- Dennis Tyler (born 1942), American politician
- Dennis Chima Ugwuegbu, Nigerian professor
- Dennis Uphill (1931–2007), English footballer
- Dennis Utter (1939–2011), American politician
- Dennis Uy (born 1973), Chinese-Filipino businessman
- Dennis Anthony Uy (born 1966), Filipino businessman
- Dennis Vacco (born 1952), American lawyer and politician
- Dennis van Valkenburgh (born 1944), American sprint canoer
- Dennis Van der Meer (1933–2019), South African tennis administrator, instructor and coach
- Dennis Van Roekel, American labor leader
- Dennis Van Vaerenbergh (born 1998), Belgian footballer
- Dennis Van Zant (born 1952), American basketball player
- Dennis Vance (1924–1983), British TV producer and director
- Dennis Vanendert (born 1988), Belgian cyclist
- Dennis Vaske (born 1967), American ice hockey player
- Dennis Velez, US Navy admiral
- Dennis Vélez Barlucea, Puerto Rican politician
- Dennis Ververgaert (born 1953), Canadian ice hockey player
- Dennis L. Via, United States Army general
- Dennis Vial (born 1969), Canadian ice hockey player
- Dennis Villanueva (born 1992), Filipino footballer
- Dennis Villarojo (born 1967), Filipino Catholic bishop
- Dennis Vinzant (1906–1976), American athlete and coach
- Dennis Viollet (1933–1999), English footballer
- Dennis Virkler (1941–2022), American film editor
- Dennis Visser (born 1993), South African rugby union footballer
- Dennis Visser (speed skater) (born 1995), Dutch speed skater
- Dennis Vitolo (born 1956), American racing driver
- Dennis Vos (born 2001), Dutch footballer
- Dennis Vosper, Baron Runcorn (1916–1968), British Conservative politician
- Dennis de Vreugt (born 1980), Dutch chess grandmaster
- Dennis Wagner (American football) (born 1958), American football player and coach
- Dennis Wagner (chess player) (born 1997), German chess grandmaster
- Dennis Waidner (born 2001), German footballer
- Dennis Waight (1895–1984), British military officer
- Dennis Wainwright(1935–2024), Bermudian cricketer
- Dennis Walaker (1941–2014), American politician
- Dennis Walcott (born 1951), American politician
- Dennis Walger (born 1984), German rugby union player
- Dennis Walks, Jamaican singer
- Dennis Wallace (born 1962), Jamaican sprinter
- Dennis Walsh (1933–2005), British astronomer
- Dennis G. Walsh (born 1965), American bishop of the Catholic Church
- Dennis Walters (1928–2021), British politician
- Dennis Walters (golfer) (born 1949), American trick-shot golfer
- Dennis Wanjala (born 1998), Kenyan footballer
- Dennis Wann (born 1950), English footballer
- Dennis Wardlow, American politician
- Dennis Waring, American historian and ethnomusicologist
- Dennis Warmerdam (born 1994), Dutch field hockey player
- Dennis Warrior (1922–2011), English rugby league footballer
- Dennis Washburn (born 1954), American scholar and translator
- Dennis Washington (born 1934), American billionaire industrialist
- Dennis Watkin (1912–1983), English cricketer
- Dennis Watkins (born 1978), American magician
- Dennis Watkins (playwright), Australian playwright, producer and performer
- Dennis Wallace Watson (1914–2008), Canadian-American professor
- Dennis Weatherby (1959–2007), American scientist
- Dennis Weathersby (born 1980), American football player
- Dennis Weatherstone (1930–2008), British banker
- Dennis Weaver (1924–2006), American actor
- Dennis Weening (born 1977), Dutch television presenter
- Dennis Wegner (born 1991), German footballer
- Dennis Weiland (born 1974), German footballer
- Dennis Werth (born 1952), American baseball player
- Dennis Westcott (1917–1960), English footballer
- Dennis Wheatley (1897–1977), English author
- Dennis Whitney (1942–2005), American spree killer
- Dennis A. Wicker (born 1952), American lawyer and politician
- Dennis Widdop (1931–2016), English footballer
- Dennis Wideman (born 1983), Canadian ice hockey player
- Dennis Widgren (born 1994), Swedish footballer
- Dennis Wiersma (born 1986), Dutch politician
- Dennis van Wijk (born 1962), Dutch footballer
- Dennis Wilder, American intelligence officer
- Dennis Williamson, English rugby league footballer
- Dennis Willis (born 1967), American film director
- Dennis Wilshaw (1926–2004), English footballer
- Dennis van Winden (born 1987), Dutch road bicycle racer
- Dennis Windross (1938–1989), English footballer
- Dennis Winston (born 1955), American football player and coach
- Dennis Wirgowski (1947–2014), American football player
- Dennis Wise (born 1966), English footballer and manager
- Dennis Wit (born 1951), American soccer player
- Dennis Wliszczak (born 1978), Austrian Paralympic athlete
- Dennis Wojtanowski (born 1950), American politician
- Dennis Wojtkiewicz, American painter
- Dennis Wolf (born 1978), German bodybuilder
- Dennis Wolfberg (1946–1994), American comedian and actor
- Dennis C. Wolff (born 1951), American farmer, non-profit founder and former public official
- D. J. Wonnum (born 1997), American football player
- Dennis Woodberry (born 1961), American football player
- Dennis Woodhead (1925–1995), English footballer
- Dennis Woodruff (1952–2024), American actor
- Dennis Woodside, American businessman
- Dennis Woolverton (1790–1875), Canadian politician
- Dennis Worden, American comic book writer
- Dennis Wright (1919–1993), English footballer
- Dennis H. Wright (1931–2020), British pathologist
- Dennis Wrong (1923–2018), Canadian-born American sociologist and professor
- Dennis Wuycik (born 1950), American basketball player
- Dennis Wyndham (1887–1973), South African actor
- Dennis Wyness (born 1977), Scottish footballer
- Dennis Yaager, Australian soccer player
- Dennis Yagmich (born 1948), Australian cricketer
- Dennis Yamada (1944–2020), American politician
- Dennis Yao (born 1953), American academic
- Dennis K. Yorath (1905–1981), Canadian aviator
- Dennis Yost (1943–2008), American singer
- Dennis Yu, Hong Kong film director
- Dennis Zachariasson (born 1974), Danish cricketer
- Dennis Zanette (1970–2003), Italian cyclist
- Dennis Zent (born 1948), American politician
- Dennis Ziadie (1946–1986), Jamaican footballer
- Dennis Ziegenhorn (born 1947), American politician
- Dennis Zine (born 1947), American politician
- Dennis Zuill (born 1978), Bermudian footballer

=== Fictional characters ===
- Dennis Blunden, main character from Head of the Class
- Dennis Creevey, minor character from Harry Potter
- Dennis Finch, main character from Just Shoot Me
- Dennis Guilder, a main character in Stephen King's novel Christine and its film adaptation
- Dennis Lapman, character from Final Destination 5
- Dennis, Steve’s pet wolf from A Minecraft Movie (2025)
- Dennis Loughran, aka Denisovich, from the 2015 animated sequel film Hotel Transylvania 2 and its two sequels Hotel Transylvania 3: Monster Vacation and Hotel Transylvania 4: Transformania is the young vampire/human hybrid son of vampire Mavis and human Johnathon.
- Dennis, a minor toy truck character from the Ted tv series
- Dennis Nedry, character from Jurassic Park
- Dennis Reynolds, main character from It's Always Sunny in Philadelphia
- Dennis, Stanley's talking pet goldfish in the Playhouse Disney animated show Stanley
- Dennis Tanner, character on Coronation Street from its first episode in 1960 until 2014.
- Dennis the Hitman, is Plankton's bounty hunter and the secondary main villain from The SpongeBob SquarePants Movie (2004)
- Dennis the Diesel, minor character from Thomas and Friends
- Dennis, character from Far Cry 3
- Dennis, the title character in the 2006 film Love Belongs to Everyone (released in Belgium as Dennis van Rita), played by Matthias Schoenaerts
- Dennis the Menace (UK comics) in The Beano
- Dennis the Menace (U.S. comics), a daily syndicated newspaper comic strip whose eponymous protagonist is named Dennis Mitchell
  - Dennis the Menace (film) (released in the United Kingdom as Dennis), a 1993 live-action American family film based on the comic strip
- Dennis the Peasant, minor character from Monty Python and the Holy Grail
- Dennis Duffy, a minor character from 30 Rock
- "Phantom Dennis", Cordelia Chase's deceased roommate on Angel
- Dennis "Cutty" Wise, character on the HBO drama The Wire
- Dennis, a localized name for Kurama, in the Tagalog dub of YuYu Hakusho (known in the Philippines as Ghost Fighter)
- Dennis Whitaker, a character from the HBO medical drama "The Pitt", played by Gerren Howell

== People with the surname Dennis ==
=== A–L ===
- Ancil Dennis, Tobago politician
- Aubrey Dennis (1929–2010), South African cricketer
- Bill Dennis (born 1935), American NASCAR driver
- Bo Dennis, fictional star of Lost Girl
- C. J. Dennis (1876–1938), Australian poet
- Carl Dennis (born 1939), American poet and educator
- Carolyn Dennis (born 1954), American singer and actor
- Cathy Dennis (born 1969), English singer-songwriter, record producer and actress
- Cecil Dennis (1931–1980), Liberian political figure who served as Minister of Foreign Affairs
- Charles Dennis (born 1946), Canadian actor, playwright, director and screenwriter
- Cheri Dennis (born 1979), American singer
- Cindy-Lee Dennis, Canadian professor, University of Toronto
- Clare Dennis (1916–1971), Australian breaststroke swimmer
- David W. Dennis (1912–1999), American politician
- Derek Dennis (born 1988), American football player
- Diana Dennis (born 1951), American female bodybuilder
- Eddie Dennis (born 1986), Welsh professional wrestler
- Elias Smith Dennis (1812–1894), American lawyer, politician and soldier
- Elizabeth Salisbury Dennis (born 1943), Australian plant molecular biologist
- Emmanuel Dennis (born 1997), Nigerian football player
- Eugene Dennis (1905–1961), American politician and leader of the Communist Party USA
- Everette Dennis (fl. 2010s), American scholar
- Felix Dennis (1947–2014), English magazine publisher and philanthropist
- Ferdinand Dennis (born 1956), Jamaican-born writer, broadcaster, journalist
- Franklyn Dennis (born 1947), Canadian cricketer
- Gabriel Lafayette Dennis (1896–1954), Liberian politician
- Geoffrey Dennis (1892–1963), English writer
- George Dennis (disambiguation), multiple people
- Hershel Dennis (born 1984), American football player
- Hugh Dennis (born 1962), English actor, comedian, writer
- Jack Dennis (born 1931), American electrical engineer and computer scientist
- Jake Dennis (born 1995), British Formula E driver
- James Dennis (disambiguation), multiple people
- John Dennis (disambiguation), multiple people
- Kristian Dennis (born 1990), English footballer
- Lawrence Dennis (1893–1977), American diplomat, consultant and author
- Les Dennis (born 1953), English comedian and actor
- Littleton Dennis Jr. (1765–1833), associate justice of the Maryland Court of Appeals
- Littleton Purnell Dennis (1786–1834), American politician
- Lori Dennis (born 1969), American interior designer

=== M–Z ===
- Mabel Sessions Dennis (1895–1990), American newspaper editor, publisher, and socialite
- Matt Dennis (1914–2002), American singer and bandleader
- Matthew Dennis (English footballer) (born 2002), English footballer
- Monika Larsen Dennis (born 1963), Swedish sculptor, filmmaker
- Morgan Dennis (1892–1960), American illustrator and author
- N. Dennis (1929–2013), Indian politician
- Nick Dennis (1904–1980), American actor
- Nigel Dennis (1912–1989), English writer, critic, playwright and magazine editor
- Oliver Perry Dennis (1858–1927), American architect
- Patrick Dennis (1921–1976), American author
- Peter Dennis (disambiguation), multiple people
- R. Keith Dennis (1944–2024), American mathematician
- RayJ Dennis (born 2001), American basketball player
- Richard Dennis (born 1949), American commodities trader
- Richard William George Dennis (1910–2003), British mycologist
- Rillie P. Dennis (died 1955), American politician from Maryland
- Robert J. Dennis (fl. 1980s–2020s), American businessman, chairman and CEO of Genesco
- Ron Dennis (born 1947), English former executive chairman of McLaren Automotive
- Roy L. Dennis (1961–1978), American boy afflicted with craniodiaphyseal dysplasia
- Samuel Dennis (academic) (fl. 1770s–1790s), English academic administrator
- Samuel Dennis (Australian politician) (1870–1945), Australian politician
- Samuel K. Dennis (died 1892), American politician
- Samuel K. Dennis Jr. (1874–1953), American politician and judge
- Sandy Dennis (1937–1992), American theater and film actress
- Shaun Dennis (1969–2025), Scottish footballer
- Simon Dennis (disambiguation), multiple people
- SirVocea Dennis (born 2000), American football player
- Stefan Dennis (born 1958), Australian actor
- Steve Dennis (Canadian football) (1951–2026), Canadian football player
- Tom Dennis (disambiguation), multiple people
- Wesley Dennis (born 1963), American country music artist
- Weston Dennis (fl. 2010s–2020s), also known as Westballz, American Super Smash Bros. Melee player
- William Dennis (disambiguation)
- Willie Dennis (1926–1965), American jazz trombonist
- Willye Dennis (1926–2012), American librarian and civil rights activist

== See also ==
- Deioneus: Deon, Deion, Deone, Dion, Dione, Dionne
- Dionysius: Dionis, Dionisi, Dionisia, Dionisie, Dionisi, Dionisije, Dionisio, Dionisius/Dionisiy, Dionys, Dionysio, Dionysios, Dionysious
  - Denice (disambiguation, given name), Denis (given name, surname), Denisa, Denise (disambiguation, given name), Deniska, Denni, Dennis, Dennise, Deniss, Denisse, Denny (given name, surname), Dennys, Denys, Denyse
