= Schulting =

Schulting is a Dutch surname.

People with this surname:

- Dennis Schulting, Dutch philosopher
- Harry Schulting (born 1956), Dutch track and field athlete
- Peter Schulting (born 1987), Dutch cyclist
- Suzanne Schulting (born 1997), Dutch short track speed skater
