= Widdop =

Widdop is a surname. Notable people with the surname include:

- Dennis Widdop (1931–2016), English footballer
- Gareth Widdop (born 1989), English professional rugby league footballer
- Jane Widdop (born 2002), American actor
- Walter Widdop (1892–1949), British operatic tenor.

Widdop Reservoir is located near Hebden Bridge and managed by Yorkshire Water.
