= Peter Dennis (disambiguation) =

- Peter Dennis (1933–2009), a British actor
- Peter Dennis, a British illustrator

Peter Dennis may also refer to:

- Hugh Dennis (Peter Hugh Dennis, born 1962), English actor, comedian and voice-over artist

== See also ==
- Peter Denis (1713–1778), English naval officer and Member of Parliament
- Dennis (surname)
