= Dennis Griffiths (footballer) =

Welsh footballer

Personal information
- Date of birth: 12 August 1935
- Place of birth: Ruabon, Wales
- Date of death: 13 August 2005 (aged 70)
- Place of death: Wrexham, Wales
- Position: Right-half

Youth career
- Wrexham

Senior career*
Years	Team	Apps	(Gls)
1953–1958	Wrexham	67	(3)
- Bangor City
- * Club domestic league appearances and goals

Dennis Griffiths (12 August 1935 – 13 August 2005) was a Welsh professional footballer, who played as a right-half. He made appearances in the English Football League for Wrexham in the 1950s. He also played for Welsh league club Bangor City.
