= Dennis Gibson =

Dennis Gibson may refer to:

- Dennis Gibson (American football) (born 1964), former American football linebacker
- Dennis Gibson (academic) (born 1942), British-born Australian academic and mathematician
