= Dennis Peters =

Dennis Peters may refer to:

- Dennis Alaba Peters (1927–1996), Gambian actor
- Dennis G. Peters (1937–2020), analytical chemist
