= Dennis Geiger =

Dennis Geiger may refer to:

- Dennis Geiger (footballer, born 1984), German footballer
- Dennis Geiger (footballer, born 1998), German footballer

== See also ==
- Geiger
