= Dennis Hess =

American chemical engineer and academic

Dennis W. Hess
- Born: Dennis William Hess; March 1, 1947 (age 78); Reading, Pennsylvania, U.S.
- Education: Albright College (B.S.); Lehigh University (M.S., Ph.D.)
- Known for: Research on thin films, surfaces and interfaces, and plasma processing for microelectronics
- Scientific career
- Fields: Chemical engineering; materials science; microelectronics; plasma processing
- Institutions: Georgia Institute of Technology; University of California, Berkeley; Lehigh University; Fairchild Semiconductor

Dennis William Hess (born March 1, 1947) is an American chemical engineer and academic who is Emeritus Professor of Chemical and Biomolecular Engineering at the Georgia Institute of Technology. His research has focused on thin films, surfaces and interfaces, and plasma processing, including applications in microelectronics manufacturing and materials processing. He served as President of The Electrochemical Society (ECS) for the 1996–1997 term and held editor-in-chief roles for ECS journals, including Electrochemical and Solid-State Letters and the ECS Journal of Solid State Science and Technology.

== Early life and education ==
Hess was born in Reading, Pennsylvania. He earned a B.S. in chemistry from Albright College and M.S. and Ph.D. degrees in physical chemistry from Lehigh University.

== Career ==
After completing graduate studies, Hess joined Fairchild Semiconductor in Palo Alto, California (1973–1977), where his work included research on silicon oxidation and passivation of semiconductor and dielectric surfaces and interfaces, and later supervision of CMOS process development.

In 1977, he joined the University of California, Berkeley, as a faculty member in chemical engineering, later serving in administrative roles including Assistant Dean in the College of Chemistry and Vice Chair of the department. In 1991, he moved to Lehigh University, where he served as department chair.

Hess joined the Georgia Institute of Technology faculty in 1996 and served on the faculty through 2020, later becoming emeritus.

== Research ==
Hess’s research interests include thin films, surfaces and interfaces, and plasma processing, with applications in microelectronics-related materials and device processing.

== Professional service ==
Hess served as President of The Electrochemical Society for the 1996–1997 term. He has held editorial leadership roles, including editor-in-chief positions for ECS journals.

== Awards and honors ==
Hess has received multiple honors from The Electrochemical Society, including:

Honorary Membership (2016).

Edward Goodrich Acheson Award (2012).

Henry B. Linford Award for Distinguished Teaching (2014).

Gordon E. Moore Medal for Outstanding Achievement in Solid State Science and Technology (2005).

Thomas D. Callinan Award (1993).

He was named an ACS Fellow in the 2013 class of ACS Fellows.

Hess has been elected a fellow of multiple professional societies:

- Fellow of The Electrochemical Society (1993).
- Fellow of the American Institute of Chemical Engineers (1998).
- Fellow of the American Association for the Advancement of Science (2002).

== Selected works ==
- Hess, Dennis W. Leadership by Engineers and Scientists: Professional Skills Needed to Succeed in a Changing World. John Wiley & Sons, 2018.
