= Dennis Bennett =

Dennis Bennett may refer to:

- Dennis Bennett (baseball) (1939–2012), Major League Baseball player
- Dennis Bennett (priest) (1917–1991), American Episcopal priest
