= Dennis Hettinga =

Dutch footballer (born 1995)

Personal information
- Date of birth: 12 September 1995 (age 31)
- Place of birth: Deventer, Netherlands
- Height: 1.87 m (6 ft 2 in)
- Position: Centre back

Team information
- Current team: Helios

Youth career
- 2010–2013: SV Helios

Senior career*
Years	Team	Apps	(Gls)
2013–2014	Helios		
2014–2015	Rohda Raalte		
2015–2019	Go Ahead Eagles	26	(0)
2019–2020	TOP Oss	5	(0)
2020	WHC		
2021–2022	De Treffers	24	(1)
2022–2023	DOVO		
- * Club domestic league appearances and goals as of 4 September 2020

Dennis Hettinga (born 12 September 1995) is a Dutch footballer. He formerly played for Go Ahead Eagles and TOP Oss.

== Club career ==
He started his career at hometown club Helios, then played for Rohda Raalte and finally made his Eerste Divisie debut for Go Ahead Eagles on 8 September 2017 in a game against FC Volendam. He moved to TOP Oss in 2019 after his contract with the Eagles was not extended and a he decided to quit professional football a year later to focus on a social career. In 2021 he joined amateur side De Treffers, after half a season with WHC, only to be snapped up by DOVO in summer 2022. He returned to childhood club Helios in 2023.
