= Dennis Postlewhite =

English footballer

Personal information
- Full name: Dennis John Postlewhite
- Date of birth: 13 October 1957 (age 69)
- Place of birth: Birkenhead, England
- Position: Central defender

Senior career*
Years	Team	Apps	(Gls)
1976–1979	Tranmere Rovers	33	(1)
- * Club domestic league appearances and goals

Dennis Postlewhite (born 13 October 1957) is an English footballer, who played as a central defender in the Football League for Tranmere Rovers.
