= Dennis Hall (footballer) =

Australian rules footballer

Personal information
- Full name: Dennis Valentine Hall
- Born: 13 December 1923
- Died: 15 February 2005 (aged 81)
- Original team: Coburg District
- Height: 173 cm (5 ft 8 in)
- Weight: 67 kg (148 lb)

Playing career^{1}
Years	Club	Games (Goals)
1943–45	Fitzroy	5 (0)
- ^{1} Playing statistics correct to the end of 1945.

Dennis Hall (13 December 1923 – 15 February 2005) was a former Australian rules footballer who played with Fitzroy in the Victorian Football League (VFL).
