= Dennis John =

Dennis John may refer to:

- Dennis John (rugby union), former rugby union coach and player
- Dennis John (footballer) (1935–2013), former footballer

== See also ==
- Dennis St John (1928–2007), British actor
