= Tom Dennis =

Tom Dennis may refer to:

- Tom Dennis (rugby league) (fl. 1930s), rugby league footballer
- Tom Dennis (snooker player) (1882–1940), English snooker and billiards player

== See also ==
- Tom Denniss (born 1961), Australian athlete, inventor, scientist, and entrepreneur
- Thomas Dennis (disambiguation)
