= Dennis Jahn =

German politician (born 1992)

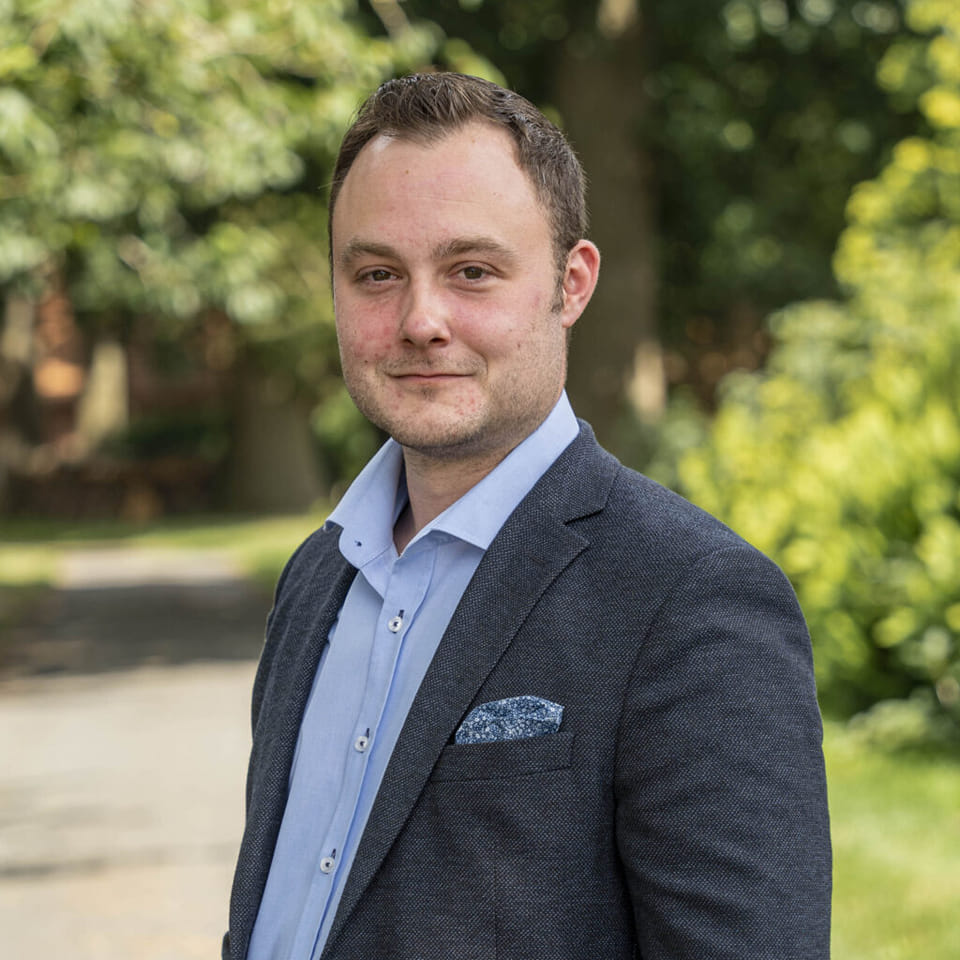
- Jahn in 2022

Member of the Landtag of Lower Saxony
- Incumbent
- Assumed office 8 November 2022

Personal details
- Born: 30 March 1992 (age 34)
- Party: Alternative for Germany (since 2017)

Dennis Jahn (born 30 March 1992) is a German politician serving as a member of the Landtag of Lower Saxony since 2022. He has been a member of the Alternative for Germany since 2017.
