= Dennis Roberts =

Dennis Roberts may refer to:

- Dennis J. Roberts (1903–1994), American politician in Rhode Island
- Dennis J. Roberts II (1941–2021), American attorney and politician
- Dennis Roberts (footballer) (1918–2001), English footballer
