= Dennis Marks =

Dennis Marks may refer to:

- Dennis Marks (screenwriter) (1932–2006), American screenwriter, producer and voice actor
- Dennis Marks (music director) (1948–2015), head of music at BBC Television
- Dennis Howard Marks (1945–2016), Welsh drug smuggler and author
