= Dennis Nolan =

Dennis Nolan may refer to:

- Dennis Nolan (politician) (born 1961), Republican member of the Nevada Senate
- Dennis E. Nolan (1872–1956), United States Army general
