= Dennis Bartley =

Australian rules footballer

Personal information
- Full name: Dennis Bartley
- Born: 15 November 1944
- Original team: East Brighton
- Height: 185 cm (6 ft 1 in)
- Weight: 85 kg (187 lb)
- Position: Forward

Playing career^{1}
Years	Club	Games (Goals)
1964–65	St Kilda	10 (7)
- ^{1} Playing statistics correct to the end of 1965.

Dennis Bartley (born 15 November 1944) is a former Australian rules footballer who played with St Kilda in the Victorian Football League (VFL).
