= Dennis Mugo =

Kenyan actor

Dennis Mugo is a Kenyan actor, popularly known as OJ.

== Career ==
He began acting in the high-school television series Tahidi High. He was also part of the Tahidi High technical team and assistant director. He played the role of a bad boy.

He works for the Embu County Government in the Department of Youth Empowerment and Sports. He is in charge of Talent Academy and manages the entire facility. He works alongside Tahidi High actor Immaculate Murugi, popularly known as Ashley, at the academy.
