= Simon Dennis =

Simon Dennis may refer to:

- Simon Dennis (cricketer) (born 1960), English cricketer
- Simon Dennis (footballer) (born 1973), Australian rules footballer
- Simon Dennis (rower) (born 1976), British rower
