= Dennis Mullins =

Dennis Mullins could refer to:

- Spike Mullins (1915–1994), full name Dennis Jeremiah Mullins, British comedian
- Pat Mullins (1937–2017), full name Dennis Patrick Mullins, American businessman and chairman of the Republican Party of Virginia.
