= Dennis Junk =

German politician (born 1984)

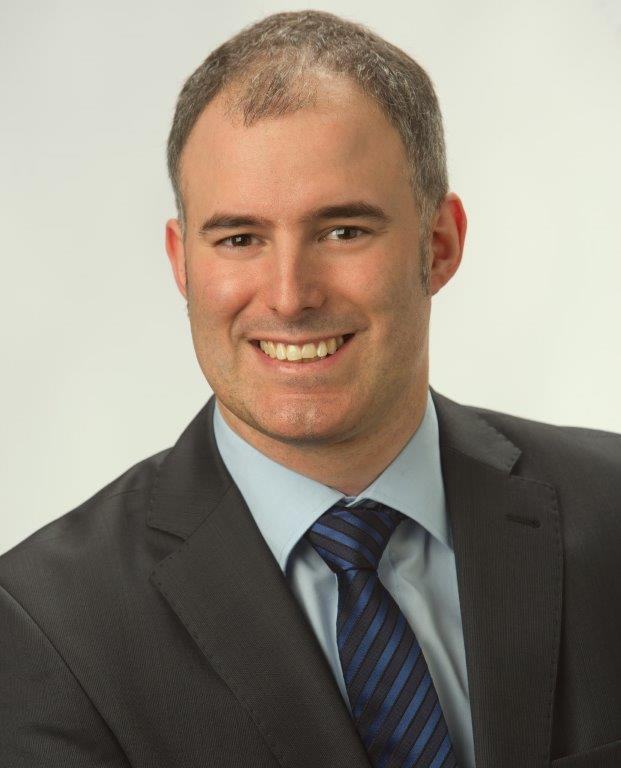
- Junk in 2019

Member of the Landtag of Rhineland-Palatinate
- Incumbent
- Assumed office 18 May 2021
- Preceded by: Elfriede Meurer
- Constituency: Wittlich

Personal details
- Born: 30 April 1984 (age 42)
- Party: Christian Democratic Union (since 2003)

Dennis Junk (born 30 April 1984) is a German politician serving as a member of the Landtag of Rhineland-Palatinate since 2021. From 2014 to 2021, he served as mayor of Wittlich-Land.
