= Dennis M. Levi =

South African optometrist

- Born: South Africa
- Occupation: university professor

Academic background
- Education: University of Houston

Academic work
- Discipline: vision science
- Sub-discipline: optometry
- Institutions: University of Houston; University of California, Berkeley

Dennis M. Levi is a South African optometrist. He is professor of optometry and vision science and a professor of neuroscience at the School of Optometry of the University of California at Berkeley, in California in the United States. He is a former dean of the same school, an appointment he took up in 2001. He was previously the Cullen Distinguished Professor of Optometry on the faculty of the University of Houston, in Houston, Texas, where he also did his PhD. He is a fellow of the American Academy of Optometry and Optica (formerly OSA). In 2016, he received the Edgar D. Tillyer Award, "For ground-breaking studies of normal spatial vision, plasticity in the adult visual system, and amblyopia."

Levi has conducted significant research into amblyopia.
