= Dennis Jenkins (footballer) =

Australian rules footballer

Personal information
- Full name: Dennis Jenkins
- Born: 29 January 1947 (age 79)
- Original team: Kew Amateurs
- Height: 183 cm (6 ft 0 in)
- Weight: 83 kg (183 lb)

Playing career^{1}
| Years | Club | Games (Goals) |
| 1967–68 | Hawthorn | 12 (0) |
- ^{1} Playing statistics correct to the end of 1968.

Dennis Jenkins (born 29 January 1947) is a former Australian rules footballer who played with Hawthorn in the Victorian Football League (VFL).
