= Dennis Schofield =

English cricketer (born 1947)

Dennis Schofield (born 9 October 1947, in Holmfirth, Yorkshire, England) is an English former first-class cricketer, who played three first-class matches for Yorkshire County Cricket Club from 1970 to 1974.

== Playing career ==
He appeared against Leicestershire in 1970, Worcestershire in 1971 and Nottinghamshire in 1974. In addition, Schofield played in three List A one day matches in 1970 and 1971. He also played in games for the Yorkshire Second XI from 1970 to 1976.

A right-arm fast bowler, Schofield took five first-class wickets, all in the same spell against Nottinghamshire, at an average of 22.40. He scored 13 runs in four not out innings. Schofield took two one day wickets at 55.50, but scored a duck in his only innings in that format.
