= Dennis Jennings =

Dennis Jennings may refer to:

- Dennis Jennings (footballer) (1910–1996), English footballer
- Dennis Jennings (Internet pioneer), Irish physicist, academic and Internet pioneer
