= Dennis Christu =

Greek-Czech footballer

Personal information
- Full name: Dennis Christu
- Date of birth: 27 July 1989 (age 37)
- Place of birth: Larissa, Greece
- Height: 1.79 m (5 ft 10 1/2 in)
- Position: Striker

Team information
- Current team: Fotbal Třinec
- Number: 7

Youth career
- Slovan Záblatí
- Bohumín
- Baník Ostrava

Senior career*
Years	Team	Apps	(Gls)
2010–2011	Žilina	4	(0)
2011–2012	Banik Ostrava	2	(0)
2012–	Fotbal Třinec	0	(0)

International career
	Czech Republic U15	3	(1)
	Czech Republic U17	1	(0)
	Czech Republic U17	3	(0)
- * Club domestic league appearances and goals as of 23 September 2010

Dionysios "Dennis" Christu (born 27 July 1989 Larissa) is a Greek-Czech footballer who plays as a striker for FK Fotbal Třinec. He played two league matches for Czech team Banik Ostrava in 2011.
