= Dennis McCoy =

Dennis McCoy may refer to:

- Dennis McCoy (BMX rider) (born 1966), American BMX rider
- Dennis McCoy (alpine skier) (born 1945), American former alpine skier
- Dennis C. McCoy (born 1942), former American politician in the Maryland House of Delegates
