= Dennis King =

Dennis King may refer to:

- Dennis King (actor) (1897–1971), English actor and singer
- Dennis King (author) (born 1952), American non-fiction author
- Dennis King (politician) (born 1971), Canadian politician, premier of Prince Edward Island

== See also ==
- Denis King (born 1939), English composer and singer
- Denis Grant King (1903–1994), archaeological draftsman
