= Dennis James (disambiguation) =

Dennis James may refer to:

- Dennis James (1917–1997), American actor and game show host
- Dennis James (bodybuilder) (born 1969), African-American bodybuilder
- Dennis James (musician), American musician prominent in the revival of silent films
