= Dennis Bland =

English cricketer

Robert Dennis Fraser Bland (16 May 1911 – 10 April 1997) was an English first-class cricketer active 1929–34 who played for Nottinghamshire. He was born and died in Nottingham.
