= Dennis Phillips =

Dennis Phillips may refer to:

- Dennis Phillips (poet) (born 1951)
- Dennis Phillips (poker player) (born 1954), amateur poker player
- Dennis Phillips (pole vaulter) (born 1946), winner of the 1968 USA Indoor Track and Field Championships
