= Dennis Lloyd (disambiguation) =

Dennis Lloyd (born 1993) is an Israeli singer, songwriter, and musician.

Dennis Lloyd may also refer to:

- Dennis Lloyd, Baron Lloyd of Hampstead (1915–1992), British jurist
- Dennis Lloyd (cricketer) (born 1948), New Zealand cricketer
