= Dennis Avery =

Dennis Avery may refer to:

- Dennis Avery (politician) (born 1946), Indiana politician
- Dennis T. Avery (1936–2020), director of the Center for Global Food Issues at the Hudson Institute
