= Dennis Ziegenhorn =

American politician (born 1947)

Member of the Missouri House of Representatives from the 160th district
- In office January 6, 1993 – January 4, 1995
- Preceded by: Ollie Amick
- Succeeded by: Joe Heckemeyer

Member of the Missouri House of Representatives from the 157th district
- In office January 5, 1983 – January 6, 1993
- Preceded by: Gary L. Smith
- Succeeded by: David Schwab

Member of the Missouri House of Representatives from the 159th district
- In office January 7, 1981 – January 5, 1983
- Preceded by: Clifford LaPlant
- Succeeded by: Mary Kasten

Personal details
- Born: December 10, 1947 (age 78) Sikeston, Missouri
- Party: Democratic

Dennis Ziegenhorn (born December 10, 1947) is an American politician who served in the Missouri House of Representatives from 1981 to 1995.
