= Dennis Thompson =

Dennis Thompson may refer to:

- Dennis Thompson (drummer) (1948–2024), drummer with the MC5
- Dennis Thompson (footballer) (1925–1986), English footballer who played for Sheffield United and Southend United
- Dennis Thompson (politician), American politician
- Dennis F. Thompson (1940–2025), political scientist and professor at Harvard University
