= Dennis Ngabirano =

Ugandan teacher, psychologist and entrepreneur

- Born: Uganda
- Education: St. Lawrence University (Uganda)
- Occupation(s): Entrepreneur, psychologist, and teacher
- Known for: Founder and CEO of food processing company Psalms Food Industries
- Spouse: Maureen Ngabirano

Dennis Ngabirano is a Ugandan teacher, psychologist and entrepreneur. He is the founder and CEO of Psalms Food Industries, a food processing company widely known as Sumz. He founded his successful food processing business as a result of his university project.

== Background and career ==
He opened a unisex salon to augment his salary, but the business survived for only two years and later opened a grocery store which also operated in same trajectory of the first business – surviving for just two years before it collapsed.

Ngabirano took a study leave from teaching and enrolled at St. Lawrance University in Uganda for a post graduate program. During his studies, he was asked to develop a business plan as part of his academic works, he considered goat rearing but quickly abandoned the plan because it is capital intensive. While still studying for his post graduate degree, Ngabirano married his wife Maureen and took her to Mombasa, Kenya for honeymoon. In Mombasa, Ngabirano and his wife met a young man making raw plantain chips on the street, curious about its taste and possible market viability in his home country of Uganda he bought some for a taste and became interested in producing it in Uganda but with ripe plantain.

As demand increased, he expanded his products to include other chips and installed processing plants.
