= Dennis McCord =

Dennis McCord may refer to:

- Dennis McCord, wrestler who used the stage name Austin Idol
- Dennis McCord (ice hockey) (1952–2005), ice hockey player
