= Dennis Olsen =

Dennis Olsen may refer to:

- Dennis Olsen (actor) (born 1938), Australian actor and singer
- Dennis Olsen (racing driver) (born 1996), Norwegian racing driver

== See also ==
- Dennis Olson, Canadian ice hockey player
