= Dennis Morris =

Dennis Morris may refer to:

- Dennis Morris (photographer), British photographer
- Dennis Morris (American football) (born 1987), American football tight end
- Dennis Ivor Morris (1924–2005), British-born Australian botanist
