= Dennis Charlton =

New Zealand footballer

Personal information
- Full name: Dennis H Charlton
- Place of birth: New Zealand

Senior career*
| Years | Team | Apps | (Gls) |
- Christchurch City
- Technical Old Boys

International career
| 1954 | New Zealand | 3 | (0) |
- * Club domestic league appearances and goals

Dennis Charlton was an association football player who represented New Zealand at international level.

Charlton played three official A-international matches for New Zealand in 1954, all against trans-Tasman neighbours Australia, the first a 2–1 win on 14 August, followed by consecutive 1–4 losses on 28 August and 4 September respectively.
