= Dennis Ward =

Dennis Ward may refer to:

- Dennis Ward (musician) (born 1969), American bassist, guitarist, vocalist and record producer
- Dennis Ward (rugby league) (1944–2021), Australian rugby league footballer
