= Dennis Morgan (disambiguation) =

Dennis Morgan (1908–1994) was an American actor and singer.

Dennis Morgan may also refer to:

- Dennis Morgan (American football) (1952–2015), American football running back
- Dennis Morgan (songwriter) (born 1952), songwriter and music publisher
