= Dennis Lyons (disambiguation) =

Dennis Lyons (1916–2011) was a British scientist.

Den(n)is Lyons may also refer to:

- Dennis Lyons, Baron Lyons of Brighton (1918–1978), British public relations consultant and peer
- Denny Lyons (1866–1929), US baseball player
- Denis Lyons (1935–2014), Irish politician
