= Dennis Robertson =

Dennis Robertson may refer to:

- Dennis Robertson (economist) (1890–1963), English economist
- Dennis Robertson (ice hockey) (born 1991), Canadian ice hockey defenceman
- Dennis Robertson (politician) (born 1956), Scottish politician
