= Dennis Hale =

Dennis Hale may refer to:

- Dennis Hale (political scientist), associate professor of political science at Boston College
- Dennis Hale (rugby league), New Zealand former international rugby league referee
- Dennis Hale (vocalist) (1922–1960), English vocalist
- Dennis Hale (1940–2015), the sole survivor of the sinking of the SS Daniel J. Morrell
