= Dennis Rivera =

Dennis Rivera could refer to:

- Dennis Rivera (labor official) (born 1950), American labor official
- Dennis Rivera (wrestler) (born 1979), American professional wrestler
