= Dennis McGrath =

Australian rules footballer

Personal information
- Full name: Dennis McGrath
- Born: 7 September 1946
- Died: 19 August 2004 (aged 57)
- Original team: Noble Park
- Height: 193 cm (6 ft 4 in)
- Weight: 87 kg (192 lb)
- Position: Ruck

Playing career^{1}
Years	Club	Games (Goals)
1965–68	North Melbourne	36 (6)
- ^{1} Playing statistics correct to the end of 1968.

Dennis McGrath (7 September 1946 – 19 August 2004) was an Australian rules footballer who played with North Melbourne in the Victorian Football League (VFL).
