= Dennis Lee Askew =

American author and musician

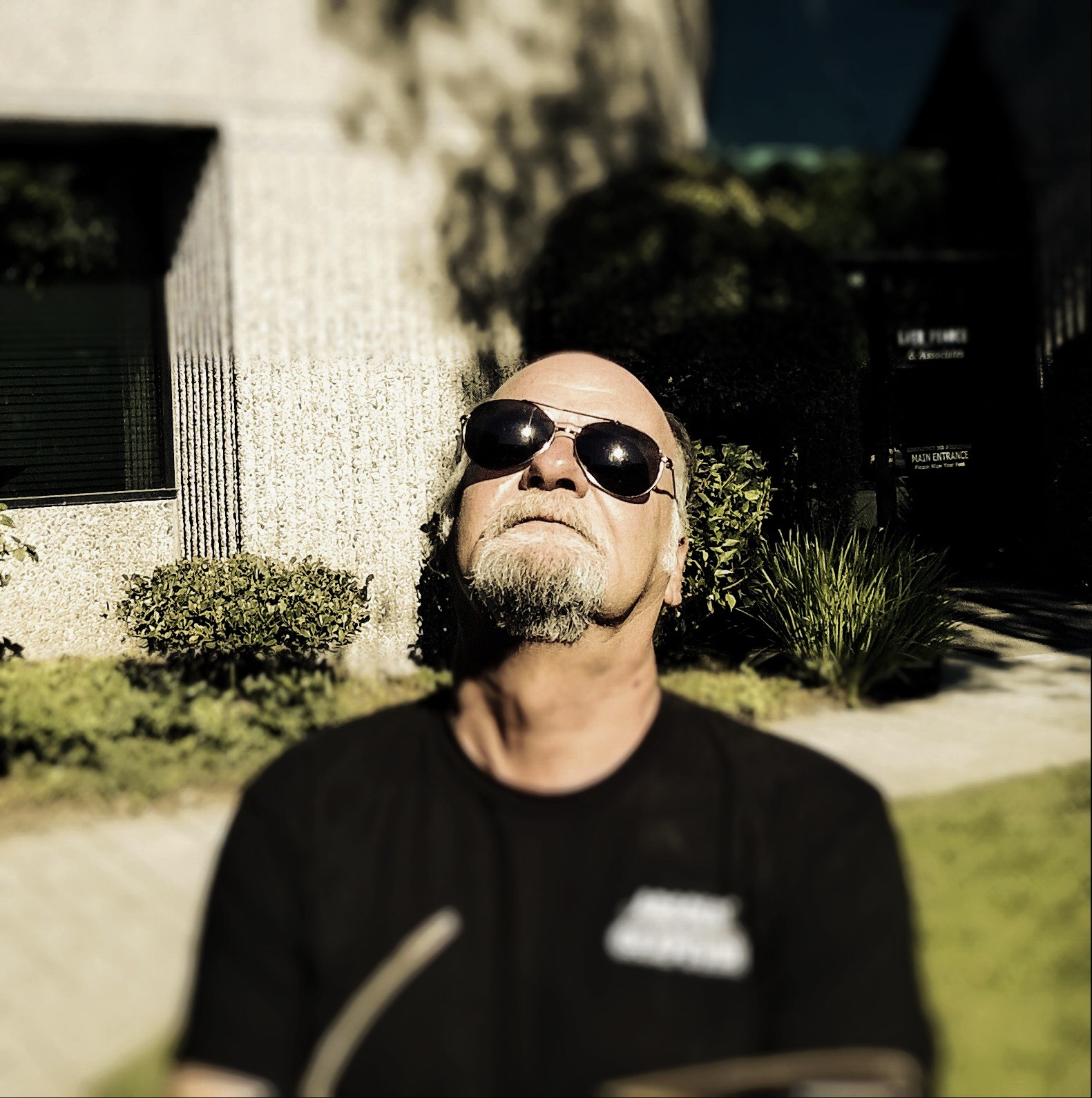
- In sunny Laguna Hills, CA - Nov. 9, 2013
- Born: Dennis Lee Askew; April 19, 1953; Las Vegas, NV
- Died: December 21, 2016 (aged 63); Santa Ana, California
- Occupations: Poet, musician, painter, author, journalist and community volunteer activist

Dennis Lee Askew (born April 19, 1953), also known as Den the Pen, is an American poet, musician, painter, author, journalist and community volunteer activist.

== Early years ==
Askew was raised in a small town environment. The population of Las Vegas, Nevada during the early 1950s was less than 50,000. His father and his uncle were gamblers and club owners from Florida and moved to Nevada after World War II.

== Career ==
In the late 1950s and into the early 1960s, Askew took jazz guitar lessons and formed numerous backyard and back-porch bands. He formed The Stars in the early 1970's. The band later changed its name to the Universe.

In 1976 Askew landed a recording contract with a small record label in Los Angeles called PBR Records and recorded a self-titled album. The progressive-rock album was released globally to worldwide acclaim. In 1978 Askew released a follow-up album, a rock operetta called Star Child under the Universe banner.

In 1980 Askew wrote about rock'n'roll and contemporary music under the banner "Rock Talk" at the Las Vegas Sun newspaper for five years. By 1988, Askew was out of the music industry and he wrote a widely acclaimed novel called "A Handful of Dreams". He also wrote a stageplay and a screenplay.

In 1993 he followed up with a series of poetry books called The Big World of Love and writing under the nom de plume of Den the Pen, he followed up with four more books of poetry based on the central theme of love. It was during this time that Askew began painting, combining words and watercolors.

In 1996 he went online at DenThePen.com, and the website featuring his poems has been online for over 20 consecutive years. While building sites for the Universe and Rock Talk over the years, he continued writing in different fields, including a sci-fi film treatment, and editing six fine art books on such nationally meritorious painters as Millard Sheets and Ken Potter.

From the 90's and into the millennium, Askew wrote about economics and the financial markets for a dozen years. He wrote speeches for the senior management of publicly traded companies as well as speeches on the importance of volunteering in local communities.
