= Dennis Housden =

English footballer (born 1953)

Personal information
- Date of birth: 15 March 1953 (age 72)
- Place of birth: Islington, England

Senior career*
Years	Team	Apps	(Gls)
1971–1973	Gillingham	16	(1)
- * Club domestic league appearances and goals

Dennis Housden (born 15 March 1953) is an English former professional footballer of the 1970s. He was born in Islington, and played in the Football League for Gillingham, making 16 appearances.
