= Dennis Helmich =

German politician (born 1991)

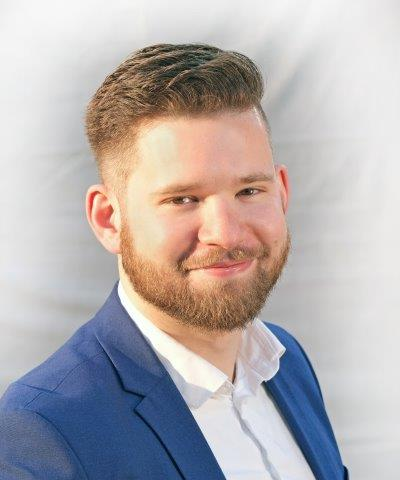
- Helmich in 2021

Member of the Landtag of Saxony-Anhalt
- Incumbent
- Assumed office 6 October 2026

Personal details
- Born: 8 September 1991 (age 35)
- Party: Alliance 90/The Greens (since 2009)

Dennis-Tobias Helmich (born 8 September 1991) is a German politician who was elected member of the Landtag of Saxony-Anhalt in 2026. He has served as co-chairman of Alliance 90/The Greens in Saxony-Anhalt since 2021.
