= Dennis Boles =

Dennis Boles may refer to:

- Sir Dennis Boles, 1st Baronet (1861–1935), British Conservative Member of Parliament (MP) 1911–1921
- Dennis Coleridge Boles (1885–1958), British Army officer and Conservative politician
