= Dennis Lawrence (disambiguation) =

Dennis Lawrence (born 1974) is a footballer.

Dennis Lawrence may also refer to:

- Dennis Lawrence (cross-country skier) (born 1965), Canadian cross-country skier
- Denis Lawrence, see Antonio Cabral

== See also ==
- Denny Lawrence, Australian actor, writer, producer and director
- Lawrence Dennis (1893–1977), American diplomat, consultant and author
