= Dennis Isherwood =

Dennis Isherwood may refer to:

- Dennis Isherwood (footballer, born 1924) (1924–1974), English footballer with Chester
- Dennis Isherwood (footballer, born 1947) (born 1947), English footballer with Birmingham City
