= Dennis Kennedy =

Dennis Kennedy may refer to:

- D. James Kennedy (1930–2007), American pastor, evangelist, and Christian broadcaster
- Dennis Kennedy (author) (born 1940), American author of books on theater and performance
- Dennis Campbell Kennedy (1936–2026), writer on Irish and European affairs
