= Dennis Watkin =

English cricketer

Dennis Watkin (28 June 1912 – 23 March 1983) was an English first-class cricketer active 1937–49 who played for Nottinghamshire. He was born in Stapleford; died in Bramcote.
