= Dennis Burton =

Dennis Burton may refer to:

- Dennis Burton (immunologist), British immunologist
- Dennis Burton (artist) (1933–2013), Canadian artist

== See also ==
- Dennis Barton (1939–2022), Canadian politician
