= Dennis Casey =

Dennis or Denis Casey may refer to:

- Denis Casey, see 2008–2012 Irish banking crisis
- Dennis Casey (baseball) (1858–1909), baseball player
- Dennis Casey (politician) (born 1960), member of the Oklahoma House of Representatives
- Dennis Casey (musician), member of Flogging Molly
