= Dennis Richardson =

Dennis Richardson may refer to:

- Dennis Richardson (public servant) (born 1947), former Director-General of ASIO, former Australian ambassador to the US
- Dennis Richardson (politician) (1949–2019), American politician
- Dennis Richardson (Hollyoaks), a fictional character in the British soap opera Hollyoaks
