= Dennis Elwell =

Dennis Elwell is the name of:

- Dennis Elwell (astrologer) (1930–2014), British astrologer
- Dennis Elwell (politician) (born 1945), former mayor of Secaucus, New Jersey
