= Dennis McNamara =

Dennis McNamara may refer to:

- Denny McNamara (born 1952), Minnesota politician and member of the Minnesota House of Representatives
- Dennis McNamara (footballer) (1935–2017), English footballer for Tranmere Rovers
- Denis McNamara (1926–2009), British wrestler
