= Dennis McGuire =

Dennis McGuire may refer to:

- Dennis McGuire (canoeist) (1939–1998), Australian sprint canoeist
- G. Dennis McGuire, American Church of God pastor
- Execution of Dennis McGuire (1960–2014), American convicted murderer executed in Ohio
