= Dennis Milne =

Scottish footballer (born 1946)

Personal information
- Date of birth: 3 April 1946 (age 80)
- Position: Centre half

Youth career
- Torry Former Pupils
- 1962–1965: Arsenal

Senior career*
Years	Team	Apps	(Gls)
1965–1966	Heracles Almelo	5	(0)
1966–1967	Royal Antwerp	0	(0)
- Bonnymuir Juveniles
1968–1972	Forfar Athletic	119	(0)
1972–1973	Brechin City	30	(0)
- Montrose Roselea
Total		154+	(0+)
- * Club domestic league appearances and goals

Dennis Milne (born 3 April 1946) is a Scottish former professional footballer who played as a centre half.

== Career ==
After playing youth football for Torry Former Pupils and Arsenal, Milne signed for Dutch club Heracles Almelo in 1965, making five appearances (the club finished 16th in the 1965–66 Eredivisie and were relegated). After one season he moved to Belgian club Royal Antwerp, where he made two appearances in friendly matches but was not registered for competitive fixtures, reported later as being due to an administrative error. He then returned to Scotland, playing with Bonnymuir Juveniles, Forfar Athletic, Brechin City, and Montrose Roselea.
