= Dennis Chima Ugwuegbu =

Nigerian professor of psychology

Dennis Chima Ugwuegbu is the first Nigerian professor of psychology. He is also the co-founder of the Department of Psychology University of Ibadan and served as the department’s first professor and chair for over fifteen years. He is one of 36 Psychotherapists in Ypsilanti, Michigan. He is the managing director of SERC.

== Early life and education ==
He was born on 2 November 1942 in Orlu, Imo State, Nigeria. His father, Ugwuegbu Osuoha Uzoechi Nwaoha, was a farmer, and his mother, Margaret Nwannediya, was a trader and farmer. He had his education at Wayne State University, B.A., 1966, M.A., 1968 and Kent State University, Ph.D., 1973.

== Career ==
He lectured at the University of Ibadan, Ibadan, Oyo State, Nigeria, between 1973 and 1977. He was a senior lecturer at the same institution between 1978 and 1982. He was the first professor of psychology and department chair between 1982 and 2004. He worked as a visiting professor to University of Waterloo between 1982 and 1983. Also to University of Michigan, as a visiting professor between 1999 and 2003. He was the board chairman of Owerri Digital Village, 1980–1990. He serves as the coordinator for Examination Commission for Foreign Medical Graduates.

== Memberships ==
- He is a member of American Psychological Association.
- He is the founder and the president of African Society for the Psychological Study of Social Issues.
- He is a member of Nigerian Psychological Society. He was the president of Nigerian Association for the Gifted and Talented.
- He is an executive member of Igbo Community Development Association (executive member).

== Publications (journals and articles) ==
Ugwuegbu has written over 250 scientific journal articles and books. Some of these are:

- (With Geder Siann) Educational Psychology in a Changing World, Allen & Unwin (London, England), 1980, 5th edition, 1989.
- (Editor, with S.O. Onwumere) Social Research and Information Gathering, Federal Government Press (Lagos, Nigeria), 1987.
- (Editor) Youth and Pornography, Federal Government Press (Lagos, Nigeria), 1991.
- (With Ben U. Eke) The Psychology of Management in African Organizations, Quorum Books (Westport, CT), 2001.
- The Shifting Tides of Value Orientation: A Case for National Development, Vantage Publishers (Ibadan, Nigeria), 2004.
- Black jurors' personality trait attribution to a rape case defendant Dr. Denis Chimaeze E. Ugwuegbu (University of Ibadan).
