= Dennis Flores =

Dennis Flores may refer to:

- Dennis Flores (soccer) (born 1993), American soccer player
- Dennis Flores (activist), Puerto Rican activist
