= Dennis Edwards (disambiguation) =

Dennis Edwards (1943–2018) was an American soul and R&B singer, notably a lead singer in The Temptations.

Dennis Edwards may also refer to:

- Dennis Edwards (footballer) (1937–2019), inside forward, mostly for Charlton Athletic
- Dennis Edwards (American football) (born 1959), defensive end for the Los Angeles Rams
- Dennis Edwards Jr. (1921–2017), judge in New York City
