= Dennis Dougherty =

Dennis Dougherty may refer to:

- Dennis A. Dougherty (born 1952), chemist at Caltech
- Dennis Joseph Dougherty (1865–1951), American cardinal of the Roman Catholic Church
