= Dennis Francis =

Dennis Francis may refer to:

- Dennis Francis (artist) (born 1957), American comic book creator
- Dennis Francis (diplomat) (born 1956), Trinidad and Tobago diplomat
