= Dennis Maher =

American artist

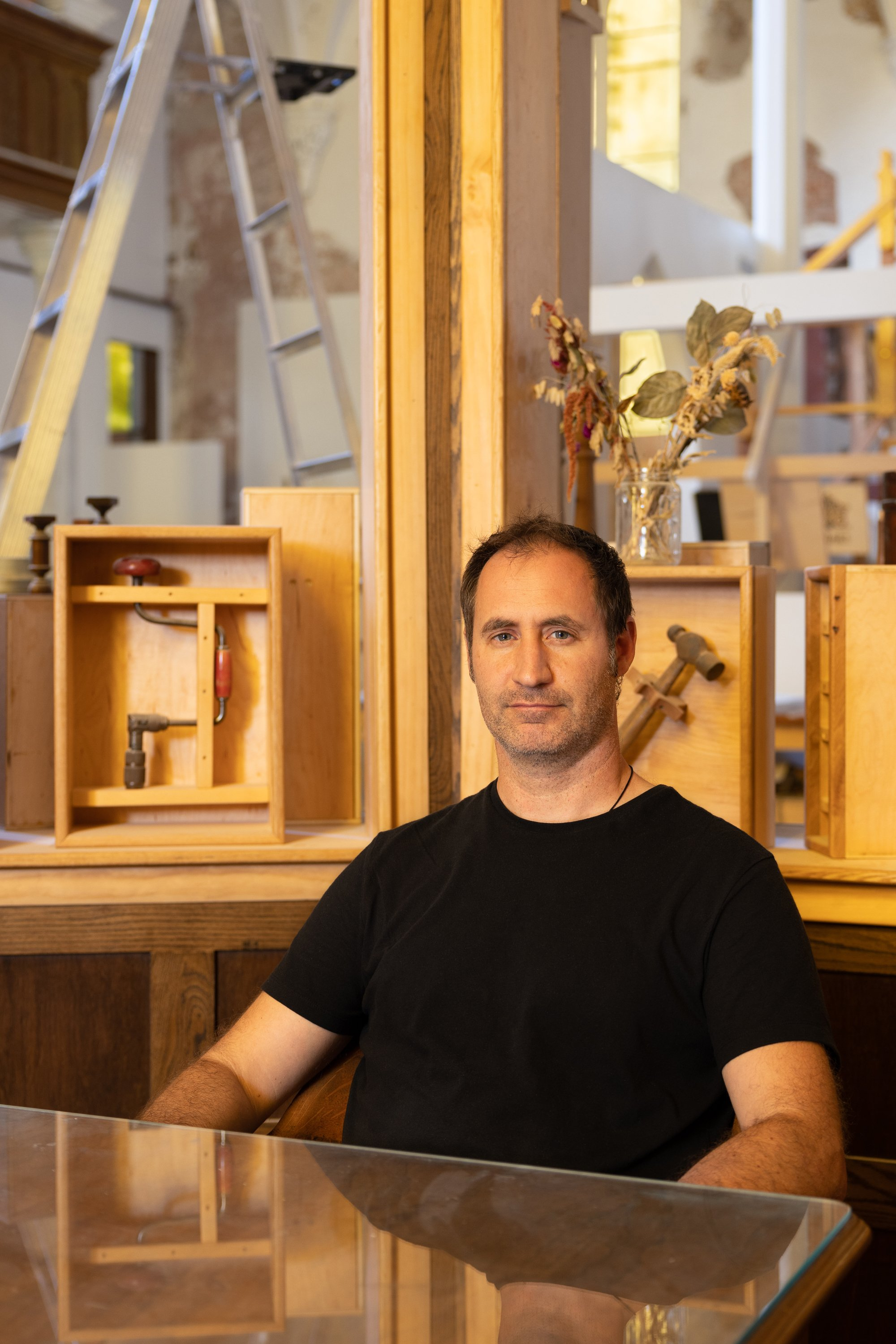
- Maher in 2022
- Born: February 3, 1976 (age 50); Baltimore, Maryland U.S.
- Education: Cornell University
- Known for: Artist; Designer
- Website: www.assembledcityfragments.com

Dennis Maher (born 1976) is an American artist based in Buffalo, NY. He works in sculpture, installation art, architecture, and design. Maher creates surreal environments from repurposed and newly built architectural fragments, furnishings, miniatures, and other objects. Maher is the founder and Executive Director of Assembly House 150 and a clinical professor in the Department of Architecture at SUNY University at Buffalo, directing initiatives that combine art and design with preservation studies, city building, and public memory.

== Early work ==
From 2003 to 2010, Maher worked on Buffalo-area demolition and renovation sites, where he developed an interest in discarded building materials, building dismantlement, and reassembly. His work is inspired by processes of ruination and reconstruction in architecture, and the circularity of materials, especially in post-industrial environments, in cities, and houses.

Maher has exhibited at Black and White Gallery and Project Space, New York, NY; Burchfield Penney Art Center, Buffalo, NY; Real Art Ways, Hartford, CT; Pittsburgh Biennial, Pittsburgh, PA; Buffalo AKG Art Museum, Buffalo, NY; Bi-City Biennale of Architecture and Urbanism, Shenzhen, China; Mattress Factory Art Museum, and Pittsburgh, PA.

== Career ==
Maher calls his works "Architectural dreamworlds" for their engagement with imagination and the built environment. Maher’s residence in Buffalo, NY The Fargo House, is a total environment of art and architectural experimentation. It is a continuously evolving assemblage project that mixes living spaces with gallery and all-encompassing artwork. In 2009, Maher worked with local housing activists to acquire two adjacent structures, an 1890s-era Victorian and an 1860-era rear cottage, which was slated for demolition on Fargo Avenue in Buffalo. While living in the main house, Maher remade the interior using secondhand objects such as antique furniture, architectural salvage, models, and miniatures. Inside the house, an evolving world of imagined miniature cities and other mise en scenes collides with basic functions like eating, cooking, and sleeping. In 2012, as an Artist-in-Residence at the Buffalo AKG Art Museum, Maher worked with building industry tradespeople on The House of Collective Repair project. Maher's experiences connecting tradespeople, art and houses fortified his regard for houses as symbols of the psyche and as thresholds between imagination and everyday life.

"A Second Home" was an installation by Maher at the Mattress Factory Art Museum in Pittsburgh from 2016 to 2023. The installation transformed the three-story house at 516 Sampsonia Way into a wonderland that collaged a house's real and imagined counterparts. The project incorporated antique furnishings, architectural salvage, miniatures, and other objects to create a multi-layered architectural oasis.

In 2015, Maher began the Assembly House project, a long-term initiative to convert the former Immaculate Conception Church at 150 Edward Street in Buffalo, New York's Allentown historic district into a cultural and educational destination. The building, contains an evolving 3D collage of architectural fragments, sculptural environments, models, and other artifacts. Assembly House is home to the Society for the Advancement of Construction Related Arts (SACRA), a construction arts training and job placement program developed by Dennis Maher with the Buffalo AKG Art Museum.
