= Dennis A. Ahlburg =

Australian economist

Dennis Allan Ahlburg is an Australian American economist who is Distinguished Professor of Economics Emeritus at Trinity University where he served as the university's 18th president.

== Career ==
Before his role with Trinity, he was the Dean of the Leeds Business Faculty at the University of Colorado at Boulder, with a previous professorship at the University of Minnesota. On May 15, 2014, Ahlburg announced that he would step down as Trinity University president effective January 1, 2015. He is a Distinguished Professor of Economics at Trinity.
