= Dennis Gratton =

English footballer

Personal information
- Full name: Dennis Gratton
- Date of birth: 21 April 1934
- Place of birth: Rotherham, England
- Date of death: 18 April 2016 (aged 81)
- Place of death: Rotherham, England
- Position: Centre half

Youth career
- Thurcroft Village YC

Senior career*
Years	Team	Apps	(Gls)
–	Worksop Town		
1955–1959	Sheffield United	6	(0)
1959–1961	Lincoln City	45	(0)
1961	Boston United	7	(0)
- * Club domestic league appearances and goals

Dennis Gratton (21 April 1934 – 18 April 2016) was an English footballer who made 51 appearances in the Football League playing for Sheffield United and Lincoln City as a centre half. He also played non-league football for Worksop Town and briefly for Boston United.
