= Dennis Daudi Afande =

Kenyan diplomat (1937–2021)

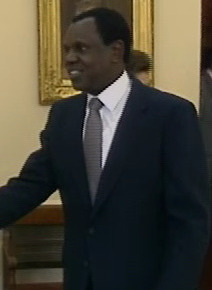
- Afande in 1988
- Born: 1937; Matayos, Busia County, Kenya
- Died: 2021 (aged 83–84)
- Occupation: Diplomat

Denis Daudi Afande (1937-2021) was a long-serving Kenyan diplomat who held eight ambassadorial positions. A consummate diplomat, Afande joined the public service at Kenya's Independence (1964). He served as Kenya's Deputy Chief of Protocol under founding President Jomo Kenyatta and Chief of Protocol under President Daniel arap Moi. He later served as Kenya's ambassador to the United States (1988-1994), the United Nations Mission in Geneva, Switzerland, the United Kingdom, Germany, France, Egypt and Saudi Arabia.

Afande retired in 1995 as Permanent Secretary of the Ministry of Health, having also served as Permanent Secretary of the Ministry of Home Affairs. In retirement, Afande served on the Boards of several state and private-sector institutions, including the Capital Markets Authority, Kenya Power and Lighting Corporation, Kenya Airways, Standard Chartered Bank, Undugu Society, and Nyumbani Children's Home, among others.

Afande was also a member of the Standing Committee on Human Rights and the National Council of Children's Services.

He was notably Kenya's ambassador to the United States in February 1990, at the time Kenya's Foreign Affairs Minister Robert Ouko was murdered two weeks after President Moi and a delegation of 83 ministers and civil servants, including the late Robert Ouko, visited Washington D.C. for a 'Prayer Breakfast' hosted by President George H. W. Bush.

The Washington Trip

Afande was Kenya's ambassador in Washington in February 1990, when former Foreign Affairs Minister Robert Ouko was murdered and hosted the delegation of Kenya's Ministers led by President Daniel Moi. This trip became a crucial part of the story and the investigations and theories surrounding the murder of Robert Ouko, who was murdered two weeks after the trip.

== Death ==
Denis Afande died on Sunday, June 6, 2021, at 11 pm at Avenue Hospital in Kisumu, aged 84. A month previously, he had been hit by a motorbike near his home in Busia as he walked to his local Catholic Church. He was survived by five children and many grandchildren.

President Uhuru Kenyatta mourned the late Afande as consummate diplomat and pioneer public servant who had a long and notable service, holding important positions in Kenya. In his message, Kenyatta said Ambassador Afande helped "position Kenya on the global map as a steadfast republic".
