= Dennis Donovan =

Dennis Donovan may refer to:

- Dennis D. Donovan (1859–1941), U.S. Representative from Ohio
- Dennis F. Donovan (1889–1974), U.S. federal judge for the District of Minnesota
