= Lori Dennis =

American interior designer

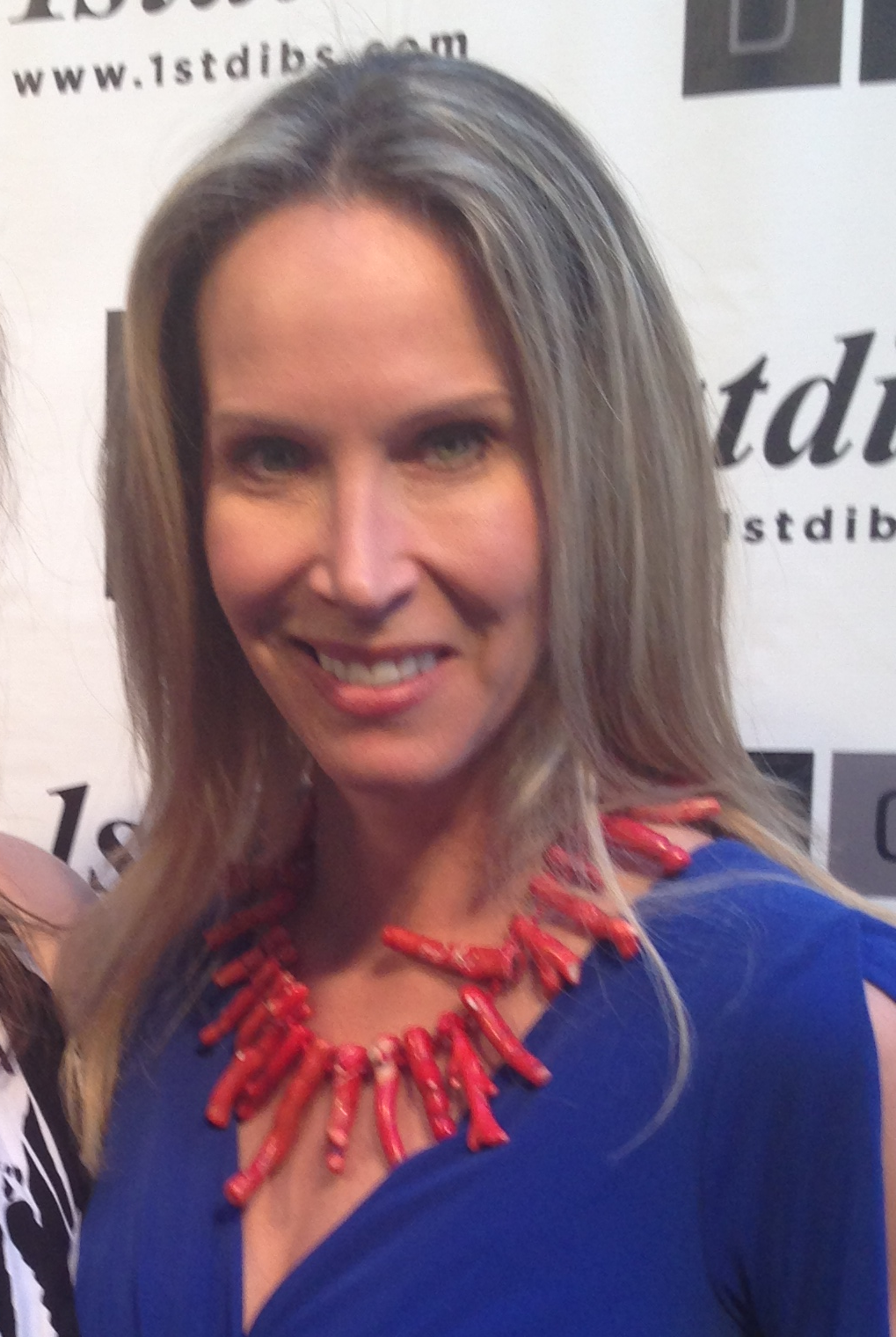
- Dennis in 2013
- Born: August 14, 1969
- Education: UCLA, Los Angeles
- Known for: Interior Design
- Website: https://www.loridennis.com/

Lori Dennis (born August 14, 1969) is an interior designer, author, and lecturer.

== Early life ==
Dennis developed her interest in design and architecture at an early age. As a teenager, she worked on her parents' remodel and attended weekly open houses.

Prior to interior design, Dennis was a stockbroker who rehabbed and sold homes and apartment buildings. She would reupholster furniture as a cost saving measure and later began to design her own furniture.

== Career ==
Dennis graduated from the UCLA Interior Architecture Master's Program in July 2000. While completing coursework, Dennis was In-house Designer for SeminarPlanet.com. In 1999, she went to work for Cheryl Rowley Interior Design. A year later, she established her own firm, Lori Dennis, Inc. Lori Dennis, Inc. specializes in sustainable (green or eco-friendly) interior design, and she is currently the principal designer of the firm. They are one of the nation's top Green Interior Design Firms, presented with the Greeopia Award in 2008, as well as the HOME Magazine "2008 Best Green Remodel" award.

In 2006, Dennis passed the NCIDQ Exam (National Council for Interior Design Qualification) and became a full member of the American Society of Interior Designers.

In 2013, Dennis co-founded Interior Design Camp, which was later sold to publicly traded Kabuni. She also joined as a star of Real Designing Women, a television show that aired on HGTVCanada.

Dennis describes her design philosophy incorporates sustainability and feng shui. Dennis is a LEED certified interior designer.
