= Dennis Hampson =

Dennis Hampson may refer to:

- Sir Dennis Hampson, 3rd Baronet (d. 1719), of the Hampson Baronets, MP for Wycombe
- Sir Dennys Francis Hampson, 11th Baronet (1897–1939), of the Hampson Baronets
- Denis Hampson (c. 1695–1807), Irish harper
