= Dennis Taylor (disambiguation) =

Dennis Taylor (born 1949) is a retired Northern Irish snooker player.

Dennis Taylor may also refer to:

- Dennis Taylor (racing driver) (1921–1962), British racing driver
- Dennis Taylor (musician) (1953–2010), Nashville-based saxophonist
- Dennis Taylor (footballer) (born 1990), Jamaican footballer
- Dennis E. Taylor, Canadian novelist and computer programmer
