= Dennis Hayden =

Dennis Hayden may refer to:

- Dennis Hayden (actor) (born 1952), American actor, producer and writer
- Dennis Hayden (gymnast), American artistic gymnast
