= Dennis Patrick Slattery =

American author, poet, and educator (born 1944)

Dennis Patrick Slattery (born October 12, 1944) is an American author, poet and educator. He is a core distinguished faculty member at Pacifica Graduate Institute, where he was involved in the development of the Mythological Studies program. He is best known for his book The Wounded Body, which was included in The Best Books for Academic Libraries in 2002.

== Early life and education ==
Slattery was born October 12, 1944. He earned his Bachelor of Arts in English and Psychology from Kent State University in 1968, followed by a Master of Arts in Comparative Literature in 1972. He later pursued advanced studies at the University of Dallas, where he obtained a second Master of Arts in Literature and Phenomenology, as well as a Ph.D. in Literature and Phenomenology in 1976

== Career ==
Slattery taught for 40 years in elementary, secondary, undergraduate, and graduate programs. He received the rank of Distinguished Core Faculty at Pacifica Graduate Institute.

Slattery writes and lectures about the poetic imagination, writing and reading as mythic activities, the relation of psyche, spirit and matter, and the place of contemplation within the academic setting. He has also studied the psychology of writers through examination of their work.

Slattery is the author of several books including: The Idiot: Dostoevsky’s Fantastic Prince; The Wounded Body: Remembering the Markings of Flesh; Grace in the Desert: Awakening to the Gifts of Monastic Life; Harvesting Darkness: Essays on Literature, Myth, Film and Culture and A Limbo of Shards: Essays on Memory, Myth and Metaphor. He is also the author of three volumes of poetry: Casting Shadows; Just Below the Water Line; and Twisted Sky. He has also contributed articles to books and journals.

With Lionel Corbett he has co-edited Depth Psychology: Meditations in the Field as well as Psychology at the Threshold. With Glen Slater, he has co-edited Varieties of Mythic Experience: Essays on Religion, Psyche and Culture. With Jennifer Selig, he has co-edited Reimagining Education: Essays On Reviving the Soul Of Learning. He serves as the Faculty Adviser to Between, the student literary journal as well as The Mythological Studies Journal, the student on-line journal, both published by Pacifica Graduate Institute.
