= Dennis Nelson =

Dennis Nelson may refer to:

- Dennis Nelson (American football) (born 1946), former American football player
- Dennis Nelson (footballer) (born 1950), Scottish former footballer
