= Dennis Lambourne =

Welsh association football player

Personal information
- Full name: Dennis James Lambourne
- Date of birth: 7 October 1945 (age 81)
- Place of birth: Swansea, Wales
- Position: Forward

Senior career*
Years	Team	Apps	(Gls)
- Llanelli
1964–1966	Wrexham	15	(4)
- Bangor City
- * Club domestic league appearances and goals

Dennis James Lambourne (born 7 October 1945) is a Welsh former professional footballer who played as a forward. He made appearances in the English football league for Wrexham. He also played in the Welsh league for Llanelli and Bangor City.
