= Dennis Sergeyev =

Russian ice hockey player

- Born: 24 August 1983 (age 42) Moscow, Russia
- Height: 6 ft 2 in (188 cm)
- Weight: 207 lb (94 kg; 14 st 11 lb)
- Position: Centre
- Shoots: Right
- KHL team Former teams: HC Neftekhimik Nizhnekamsk; Vityaz Chekhov
- NHL draft: Undrafted
- Playing career: 2003–present

Denis Valeryevich Sergeyev (born 24 August 1983) is a Russian professional ice hockey forward. He is currently playing for HC Neftekhimik Nizhnekamsk of the Kontinental Hockey League (KHL). He had previously played for Vityaz Chekhov of the KHL.
