= Dennis Jensen (disambiguation) =

Dennis Jensen (born 1962) is a former Australian politician.

Dennis Jensen may also refer to:

- Dennis Jensen (runner) (born 1969), Danish long-distance runner
- Dennis Otzen Jensen (born 1974), Danish freestyle and butterfly swimmer
