= Dennis Widdop =

English footballer

Personal information
- Full name: Dennis Anthony Widdop
- Date of birth: 14 March 1931
- Place of birth: Keighley, England
- Date of death: October 2016 (aged 85)
- Place of death: North Yorkshire, England
- Position: Winger

Senior career*
Years	Team	Apps	(Gls)
- Portadown
1954–1955	Bradford City	1	(0)
- * Club domestic league appearances and goals

Dennis Anthony Widdop (14 March 1931 – October 2016) was an English professional footballer who played as a winger.

== Career ==
Born in Keighley, Widdop signed for Bradford City from Portadown in July 1954. He made 1 league appearance for the club, before being released in June 1955.

== Sources ==
- Frost, Terry (1988). Bradford City A Complete Record 1903-1988. Breedon Books Sport. ISBN 0-907969-38-0.
