= Dennis Schulting =

Dutch philosopher (born 1969)

- Born: 1969 (age 56–57)

Education
- Education: University of Amsterdam (MA); University of Warwick (PhD)

Philosophical work
- Era: 21st-century philosophy
- Region: Western philosophy
- Institutions: University of Amsterdam
- Main interests: Kantian philosophy
- Website: https://dschulting.wixsite.com/dennisschulting/bio

Dennis Schulting (born 1969) is a Dutch philosopher and former Assistant Professor of Metaphysics and the History of Philosophy at the University of Amsterdam. He is known for his works on Kantian philosophy.

== Books ==
- Kant's Transcendental Deduction and the Theory of Apperception: New Interpretations, edited with Giuseppe Motta and Udo Thiel, De Gruyter 2022
- The Bounds of Transcendental Logic, Palgrave Macmillan 2022
- Apperception and Self-Consciousness in Kant and German Idealism, Bloomsbury 2020
- Kant’s Deduction From Apperception: An Essay on the Transcendental Deduction of the Categories, De Gruyter 2019
- Kant's Radical Subjectivism: Perspectives on the Transcendental Deduction, Palgrave Macmillan (2017)
- Kantian Nonconceptualism (ed.), Palgrave 2016
- The Bloomsbury Companion to Kant, edited with Gary Banham and Nigel Hems, Bloomsbury Academic 2015
- Kant’s Deduction and Apperception: Explaining the Categories, Palgrave Macmillan 2012
- The Continuum Companion to Kant, edited with Gary Banham and Nigel Hems, Continuum 2012
- Kant's Idealism: New Interpretations of a Controversial Doctrine, edited with Jacco Verburgt, Springer 2010
