= Denis (given name) =

- Pronunciation: English: /ˈdɛn.ɪs/ French: [dəni] Russian: [dʲɪˈnʲis]
- Gender: Male
- Language: English, French, Russian, German, Czech, Slovak, Slovene, Romanian, Serbo-Croatian, Albanian
- Name day: France: 9 October

Origin
- Meaning: Dionysus
- Region of origin: Greece

Other names
- Variant forms: Denise (Female); Denys (Ukrainian)
- Related names: Dennis

Denis (Russian: Денис) is a masculine given name. Notable people with the name include:

== Mononymous ==
- Denis of Paris (3rd century), French bishop and Christian martyr
- Denis (bishop of Győr) (13th century), Hungarian prelate
- Denis, son of Ampud (died 1236), Hungarian baron
- Denis the Carthusian (1402-1471), Roman Catholic theologian and mystic
- Denis of Hungary (c. 1210-1272), Hungarian-born Aragonese knight
- Denis of Portugal (1261-1325), king of Portugal
- Denis of the Nativity (1600-1638), French sailor and cartographer
- Denis, Lord of Cifuentes (1354-1397), infante of Portugal
- Denis the Little (c. 470-c. 544), Scythian monk
- Dênis (footballer, born 1983) (born 1983), Brazilian footballer
- Denis (footballer, born 1987) (born 1987), Brazilian professional footballer
- Denis (footballer, born 1989) (born 1989), Brazilian footballer
- Denis (footballer, born 2004) (born 2004), Brazilian footballer
- Denis, Palatine of Hungary (12th century), Hungarian lord

== A ==
- Denis Abdulahi (born 1990), Finnish professional footballer
- Denis Abdullin (born 1985), Russian KHL player
- Denis Aberhart (born 1953), New Zealand cricketer
- Denis Ablyazin (born 1992), Russian artistic gymnast
- Denis Abukuse (born 1999), Kenyan rugby sevens player who represented Kenya at the Olympics
- Denis Adam (1924-2018), New Zealand businessman and art patron
- Denis Adamov (born 1998), Russian footballer
- Denis Auguste Affre (1793-1848), French Roman Catholic archbishop
- Denis Afinogenov (born 1974), Russian UHL and RSL player
- Denis Agre (born 1988), Bulgarian NBL player
- Denis Akiyama (1952–2018), Canadian actor
- Denis Aksenov (born 1986), Russian political figure
- Denis Alekseyev (born 1987), Russian sprint athlete
- Denis Alexander (born 1945), British writer, journal editor, biochemist, theistic evolutionist, creationism critic, Evangelical Anglican, and academic
- Denis Alexander, 6th Earl of Caledon (1920-1980), Irish Earl
- Denis Alibec (born 1991), Romanian professional footballer
- Denis Alijagić (born 2003), Czech professional footballer
- Denis Alimov (born 1979), Russian luger
- Denis Allan (born 1944), Canadian chess player
- Denis Allchurch (born 1953), Canadian provincial politician
- Denis Allen (disambiguation), several people
- Denis van Alsloot (c. 1570-c. 1626), Flemish landscape- and genre painter, draughtsman, and tapestry designer
- Denis Alt (born 1980), German politician
- Denis Amelote (1609–1678), French biblical writer and scholar
- Denis Amici (born 1972), Sammarinese politician
- Denis Antonov (born 1986), Russian rugby union player
- Denis ApIvor (1916–2004), British composer
- Denis Arkhipov (born 1979), Russian NHL player
- Denis Arlashin (born 1990), Russian professional footballer
- Denis Arndt (1939–2025), American actor
- Denis Arnold (1926–1986), British musicologist
- Denis Edward Arnold (1918-2015), British Army officer
- Denis Atkins (1938–2016), English professional footballer
- Denis Atkinson (1926–2001), West Indian cricketer
- Denis Auroux (born 1977), French mathematician
- Denis Avdić (born 1982), Slovenian comedian, police officer, and radio host
- Denis Avey (1919–2015), British World War II veteran and holocaust survivor
- Denis Avril (born 1972), French international professional rugby union
- Denis Ayrapetyan (born 1997), Russian short-track speed skater
- Denis Azabagić (born 1972), Bosnian classical guitarist

== B ==
- Denis Bachurin (born 1991), Russian professional ice hockey player
- Denis Badré (born 1943), French politician
- Denis Bajramović (born 1961), Croatian basketball coach and player
- Denis Baker (born 1966), New Zealand novelist and short story writer
- Denis Bakurskiy (born 1981), Russian professional footballer
- Denis Bališ (born 1992), Slovak footballer
- Denis Ball (1926-2003), Canadian ice hockey player
- Denis Banks (born 1959), Australian VFL/AFL player
- Denis Barantsev (born 1992), Russian KHL player
- Denis Barbe (born 1978), Seychellois footballer
- Denis Barberet (1714–1770), French biologist and veterinarian
- Denis Barbet, French Paralympic alpine skier
- Denis Albert Bardou (1841–1893), French scientific equipment optician
- Denis Barnes (1914–1992), English civil servant
- Denis Barnett (1906–1992), British Royal Air Force officer
- Denis Barré (born 1948), Canadian canoeist
- Denis Barrett, Anglican priest in New Zealand in the 20th century
- Denis Barry (disambiguation), several people
- Denis Barthe, French member of rock band Noir Désir
- Denis Bastick (born 1981), Irish Gaelic footballer
- Denis Bauda (born 1947), French professional footballer and manager
- Denis Baum (born 1987), German footballer
- Denis Baumgartner (born 1998), Slovak footballer
- Denis Baupin (born 1962), French political figure
- Denis Bayev (born 1983), Ukrainian KHL player
- Denis Baylac (born 1973), French former professional footballer
- Denis Baylor (1940-2022), American neurobiologist
- Denis Beauvais (born 1962), Canadian artist
- Denis Bećirović (born 1975), Bosnian politician, professor, and historian
- Denis Bédard (born 1950), Canadian composer and organist
- Denis Begbie (1914-2009), South African cricketer
- Denis Begic (born 1970), Swedish politician
- Denis Behan (born 1984), Irish football coach and player
- Denis Bélanger (born 1964), Canadian singer and songwriter
- Denis de Belleval (born 1939), Canadian politician and administrator
- Denis Belliveau, American photographer, author, and explorer
- Denis Bellotti (born 1986), Italian short-track speed skater
- Denis Bérardier (1735-1794), French priest and theologian
- Denis Berezovsky (born 1974), Russian military personnel
- Denis Berger (born 1983), Austrian footballer
- Denis Bernard (disambiguation), several people
- Denis Berthiaume (1969-2022), Canadian academic and researcher
- Denis Bertolini (born 1977), Italian professional road racing cyclist
- Denis Betts (born 1969), English rugby league coach and player
- Denis Bingham (1829-1897), Irish cricketer and military historian
- Denis Biryukov (born 1988), Russian volleyball player
- Denis Biševac (born 1996), Serbian-born Bosnian professional footballer
- Denis Black (1897-1973), British track and field athlete
- Denis Blackmore (1943-2022), American mathematician and professor
- Denis Blanchette (born 1956), Canadian politician
- Denis Blondin (born 1947), Canadian anthropologist and writer
- Denis Blundell (1907-1984), New Zealand lawyer, cricketer, and diplomat
- Denis Bodrov (born 1986), Russian KHL player
- Denis Bogdan (born 1996), Belarusian-born Russian volleyball player
- Denis Bokov (born 2005), Russian footballer
- Denis Bolshakov (born 1987), Russian professional footballer
- Denis Bond (disambiguation), several people
- Denis Bonin, Canadian candidate in the 2011 Ontario provincial election
- Denis John Boocker (1922-1987), Welsh professional rugby league footballer
- Denis Bordun (born 2005), Romanian footballer
- Dénis Bouanga (born 1994), French-born American MLS player
- Denis Bouchard (born 1953), Canadian actor and playwright
- Denis Boucher (born 1968), Canadian MLB pitcher
- Denis Bourdoncle (born 1964), French professional footballer
- Denis Bouriakov (born 1981), Russian flautist
- Denis Bovey (1929-2023), Scottish Episcopalian priest
- Denis Bowen (1921-2006), South African artist, gallery director, and art promoter
- Denis Boyarintsev (born 1978), Russian football coach and player
- Denis Boyd (1891-1965), English Royal Navy officer
- Denis Boyles, American journalist, editor, university lecturer, and author
- Denis Boytsov (born 1986), Russian professional boxer
- Denis Braccini, French actor
- Denis Bradley (disambiguation), multiple people
- Denis Caulfield Brady (1804-1886), Irish Roman Catholic politician
- Denis Braidotti (born 1972), Italian international judoka
- Denis Bray (1926-2005), British senior colonial civil servant in Hong Kong
- Denis Brean (1917-1969), Brazilian composer, journalist, broadcaster, and lyricist
- Denis Brennan (born 1945), Irish Roman Catholic prelate
- Denis Brian (1923-2017), Welsh journalist and writer
- Denis Brière (1945/1946-2022), Canadian forestry professor and academic administrator
- Denis Brihat (1928–2024), French photographer
- Denis Brînzan (born 1996), Romanian professional footballer
- Denis Brizuela (born 1997), Argentine professional footballer
- Denis Brodeur (1930–2013), Canadian photographer and ice hockey player
- Denis William Brogan (1900-1974), Scottish writer and historian
- Denis Brogniart (born 1967), French sport journalist and television host
- Denis Brott (born 1950), Canadian cellist, music teacher, conductor, and music festival founder and artistic director
- Denis Browne (disambiguation), several people
- Denis Bryant (1918-2005), Australian Anglican bishop and Royal Air Force officer
- Denis Buckley (disambiguation), several people
- Denis Buican (1934–2025), Romanian-French scientist, bilingual writer, biologist, philosopher, and science historian
- Denis Bukhryakov (born 1981), Russian professional footballer
- Denis Bullough (1895–1975), English footballer
- Denis Buntić (born 1982), Croatian handball player
- Denis Burgarella (born 1960), French astrophysicist
- Denis Burke (disambiguation), several people
- Denis Parsons Burkitt (1911-1993), Irish surgeon
- Denis Burns (born 1952), Irish hurling manager- and player
- Denis Bushuev (born 1982), German football manager
- Denis Bušnja (born 2000), Croatian footballer
- Denis Butler (disambiguation), several people
- Denis Butsayev (born 1977), Russian statesman
- Denis Buzy (1883-1965), French archaeologist
- Denis Byam (born 1977), Vincentian cricketer
- Denis Byrne (born 1974), Irish hurler
- Denis Byrne (Medal of Honor) (1833-1905), Irish-born American Army soldier

== C ==
- Denis Čabrić, past member of Bosnian rock band Regina (Bosnia and Herzegovina band)
- Denis Calincov (born 1985), Moldovan football manager and player
- Denis Calvaert (c. 1540-1619), Antwerp-born Flemish painter
- Denis Cameron (disambiguation), multiple people
- Denis Campbell (?-1603), Scottish Anglican priest in Ireland
- Denis-François Camusat (1697-1732), French historian
- Denis Caniza (born 1974), Paraguayan footballer
- Denis Cannan (1919-2011), British dramatist, playwright, and scriptwriter
- Denis Canuel (born 1962), Canadian archer
- Denis Capel-Dunn (1903-1945), British lawyer and military bureaucrat
- Denis Caputo (born 1989), Argentine footballer
- Denis Dominique Cardonne (1721-1783), French orientalist and translator
- Denis Carey (disambiguation), several people
- Denis Carter, Baron Carter (1932-2006), British agriculturalist and politician
- Denis Carufel (1954–2023), Canadian NHL player
- Denis Cashman (1843-1897), Irish political prisoner and diarist
- Denis William Cashmore (1907-1982), English footballer
- Denis Cauchi (born 1965), Maltese professional footballer
- Denis Caverzasi (born 1994), Italian professional footballer
- Denis Čery (born 1994), Slovak footballer
- Denis Chachkhalia (born 1950), Abkhazian writer, historian, and translator
- Denis Chalifoux (born 1971), Canadian NHL and LNAH player
- Denis Chalifoux (politician) (born 1955), Canadian politician
- Denis Chang (born 1944), Hong Kong barrister and politician
- Denis Charles (1933-1998), Virgin Islands-born American jazz drummer
- Denis Charvet (born 1962), French rugby union player
- Denis Chassé (born 1970), Canadian NHL player
- Denis Chavis (18th century), Syrian priest and monk
- Denis Chen (born 1977), Guatemalan footballer
- Denis Chervyakov (born 1970), Russian NHL player
- Denis Cheryshev (born 1990), Russian footballer
- Denis Chevrier (born 1954), French engineer
- Denis Chouinard (born 1964), Canadian film director and screenwriter
- Denis Churkin (disambiguation), several people
- Denis Chushyalov (born 1992), Russian footballer
- Denis Cioban (born 1985), Moldovan road bicycle racer
- Denis Ciobanu (born 2004), Romanian footballer
- Denis Ciobotariu (born 1998), Romanian professional footballer
- Denis Clapton (born 1939), English footballer
- Denis Clark (born 1950), Australian footballer
- Denis Clarke (born 1959), Irish footballer
- Denis Clavel (1942–2024), French poet and politician
- Denis Clemente (born 1986), Puerto Rican BSN player
- Denis Cobell (born 1938), English humanist, freethought writer, secularist, pacifist, and atheist
- Denis Coderre (born 1963), Canadian politician
- Denis Coe (1929-2015), British politician
- Denis Coffey (hurler) (born 1983), Irish hurler
- Denis Coffey (physician) (1865-1945), Irish physiology professor
- Denis Joseph Cogan (c. 1858-1944), Irish businessman and politician
- Denis Colin (born 1956), French bass clarinettist and composer
- Denis Collins (disambiguation), several people
- Denis Čomor (born 1990), Bosnian professional footballer
- Denis Compton (1918-1997), English multi-sportsman
- Denis Comtet (born 1970), French organist, pianist, choral conductor, and conductor
- Denis Connaghan (1945–2024), Scottish footballer
- Denis Connaghan (footballer, born 1976) (born 1976), Scottish footballer
- Denis Connolly (born 1965), Irish installation- and video artist, and author
- Denis Constantin (born 1980), Mauritian badminton player
- Denis Conway (disambiguation), multiple people
- Denis Coolican (1913-1995), Canadian businessman and politician
- Denis Cordner (1924-1990), Australian rules footballer, industrial chemist, and diplomat
- Denis Ćorić (born 1977), Bosnian football manager
- Denis Corr (1908–1981), Northern Irish cyclist
- Denis Cosgrove (1948-2008), British cultural geographer and geography professor
- Denis Côté (born 1973), Canadian independent filmmaker and producer
- Denis Cotter, Irish celebrity chef, author, and restaurant proprietor
- Denis Cotter (cricketer) (1862-1905), Australian cricketer
- Denis Coughlan (born 1945), Irish hurler, Gaelic footballer, and manager
- Denis Coughlan (Blackrock hurler) (1871-1903), Irish sportsperson
- Denis Coulson (born 1994), Irish rugby union player
- Denis Cousins (born 1939), English cricketer
- Denis Couttet (1900-1956), French cross-country skier
- Denis Martin Cowley (1919-1985), British barrister and judge
- Denis Cregan (born 1940), Irish publican and politician
- Denis Creissels (born 1943), French linguistics professor
- Denis Cristofovici (born 1986), Moldovan goalkeeper
- Denis Crossan, Scottish cinematographer
- Denis Crouzet (born 1953), French historian
- Denis Crowley-Milling (1919-1996), Welsh World War II fighter pilot
- Denis Cubis, Australian rugby league footballer
- Denis Cukici (born 2003), Finnish professional footballer
- Denis Cullen (1886-1971), Irish politician and trade union official
- Denis Joseph Cummings (1885-1956), New Zealand policeman and police commissioner
- Denis Cunningham (born 1950), Hong Kong fencer
- Denis Curzi (born 1975), Italian long-distance runner
- Denis Cuspert (1975-2018), German rapper and ISIL member
- Denis Cussen (1901-1980), Irish sprinter, rugby union player, and doctor
- Denis Cyplenkov (born 1982), Russian professional arm wrestler
- Denis Cyr (born 1961), Canadian NHL player

== D ==
- Denis Dallan (born 1978), Italian rugby union footballer
- Denis Dalton (disambiguation), multiple people
- Denis Daluri (born 1998), South Sudanese professional footballer
- Denis Daly (disambiguation), several people
- Denis D'Amour (1959-2005), Canadian guitarist
- Denis Dangue Réwaka, Gabonese diplomat
- Denis Darbellay (born 1998), Swiss-born Thai footballer
- Denis Dasoul (1983-2017), Belgian footballer
- Denis Davydov (disambiguation), several people
- Denis Gage Deane-Tanner (1876-?), British Army personnel
- Denis Dechko (born 1990), Belarusian footballer
- Denis Decrès (1761-1820), French Navy officer, count, and duke
- Denis Defforey (1925-2006), French businessman
- Denis Degtev (born 1988), Russian professional football player
- Denis DeJordy (born 1938), Canadian NHL player
- Denis Delestrac (born 1968), French director and producer
- Denis Delfino (?-1626), Italian Roman Catholic prelate
- Denis Dempsey (1826-1896), Irish-born British Army soldier who moved to Canada
- Denis Denisenko (born 1971), Russian astronomer
- Denis Denisov (born 1981), Russian KHL and NHL player
- Denis Dercourt (born 1964), French film director and screenwriter
- Denis Dereshev (born 1978), Russian footballer
- Denis Desmond (born 1943), British company director and public administrator
- Denis-Louis Destors (1816-1882), French architect
- Denis Detcheverry (born 1953), French politician
- Denis Devaux (1939–2025), French footballer and manager
- Denis Devlin (1908-1959), Irish poet and diplomat
- Denis Diderot (1713-1784), French philosopher and co-founder of the Encyclopédie
- Denis Dighton (1792-1827), English painter
- Denis E. Dillon (1933-2010), American prosecutor and politician
- Denis Dimitrov (born 1994), Bulgarian sprinter
- Denis Dmitriev (born 1986), Russian track cyclist
- Denis Dobson (1908-1995), British solicitor, barrister, and civil servant
- Denis Dodart (1634-1707), French physician, naturalist, and botanist
- Denis Doherty (1861-1935), Australian businessman, pastoralist, and politician
- Denis Doksanský (born 1973), Czech politician
- Denis Dolecsko (1903-?), Romanian fencer
- Denis Dolgodvorov (born 1982), Russian freestyle skier
- Denis Donaldson (1950-2006), Irish volunteer
- Denis Donkervoort (born 1988), Dutch racing driver
- Denis Donnelly (1833-1896), Irish-born Australian politician
- Denis Donoghue (disambiguation), several people
- Denis Dorogaev (born 1977), Russian Paralympic swimmer
- Denis Dorozhkin (born 1987), Russian professional footballer
- Denis Douglin (born 1988), American professional boxer
- Denis Dowling (1910-1996), New Zealand-born English baritone
- Denis Doyle (1900-?), Irish footballer
- Denis Drăguș (born 1999), Romanian professional footballer
- Denis J. Driscoll (1871-1958), American lawyer, educator, and politician
- Dénis Duarte (born 1994), Portuguese professional footballer
- Denis Duboule (born 1955), Swiss-French biologist
- Denis Dubourdieu (1949-2016), French winemaker and oenology professor
- Denis Ducarme (born 1973), Belgian politician
- Denis Ducharme (born 1955), Canadian politician
- Denis Auguste Duchêne (1862-1950), French World War I general
- Denis Duchosal (born 1971), Swiss footballer
- Denis Duclos (born 1947), French sociologist and research director
- Denis Dufour (born 1953), French composer of art music
- Denis Duga (born 1994), Slovak professional footballer
- Denis Duk (born 1977), Belarusian academic
- Denis Dumitrașcu (born 1995), Romanian professional footballer
- Denis Dunlop (1892-1959), English sculptor and World War I personnel
- Denis Dupays, French choir conductor
- Denis Dupéré (1948-2019), Canadian NHL player
- Denis Dupont (born 1993), Belgian racing driver
- Denis Durnian (1950–2025), English professional golfer
- Denis Dutton (1944-2010), American philosopher of art, web entrepreneur, and media activist
- Denis Duverne (born 1953), French businessman
- Denis Dyachenko (born 1986), Ukrainian footballer
- Denis Dyack (born 1966), Canadian video game developer
- Denis Dyca (born 1996), Albanian footballer
- Denis Dynon (1822-1863), Irish recipient of the Victoria Cross
- Denis Dyogtev (born 1988), Russian professional footballer

== E ==
- Denis Eadie (1917-2015), British Army officer
- Denis Earp (1930-2019), South African military commander
- Denis Eden (1878-1949), English artist
- Denis Edozie (1935-2018), Nigerian jurist and judge
- Denis Emorine (born 1956), French poet, playwright, short-story writer, essayist, and novelist
- Denis Epstein (born 1986), German professional footballer
- Denis Espinoza (born 1983), Nicaraguan footballer
- Denis Éthier (1926-2017), Canadian politician
- Denis Evans (born 1951), Australian scientist and emeritus professor
- Denis Evans (rugby union) (1936–2022), Welsh international rugby union player
- Denis Evers (1913-2007), English athlete and aviator
- Denis Ezhov (born 1985), Russian NHL player

== F ==
- Denis Fahey (1883-1954), Irish Catholic priest, philosopher, and theologian
- Denis Farkasfalvy (1936-2020), Hungarian-American Catholic priest and monk
- Denis Farrelly (1912-1974), Irish Fine Gael politician
- Denis Faul (1932-2006), Irish Roman Catholic priest and civil rights campaigner
- Denis Favier (born 1959), French military officer
- Denis Fayzullin (born 2001), Russian footballer
- Denis Fedenko (born 1999), Russian footballer
- Denis Fedorenko (born 2003), Russian footballer
- Denis Fedotov (born 1977), Russian professional football coach and player
- Denis Feeney (born 1955), New Zealand professor
- Denis Fegne (born 1960), French politician
- Denis L. Feron (1928-2015), Belgian Olympic alpine skier
- Denis Fetahović (born 1979), Montenegrin footballer
- Denis Field (1931–2021), English athlete
- Denis Fillion (1948-2016), Canadian curler
- Denis Firago (born 2000), Belarusian professional footballer
- Denis Fitzgerald (born 1949), Australian professional rugby league footballer
- Denis Fladung (born 1979), Russian professional footballer
- Denis Flageollet, French watchmaker
- Denis Flahaut (born 1978), French professional road racing cyclist
- Denis Flannery (1928-2012), Australian rugby league footballer
- Denis Fogarty (born 1983), Irish rugby union player
- Denis Foley (1934-2013), Irish politician
- Denis Follows (1908-1983), British sports administrator
- Denis Fomin (born 1996), Russian footballer
- Denis Fonvizin (1745-1792), Russian writer and playwright
- Denis Foreman (1933-2016), South African cricketer and footballer
- Denis Forest (1960-2002), Canadian actor
- Denis Forman (1917-2013), Scottish television industry executive
- Denis Forov (born 1984), Armenian Greco-Roman wrestler
- Denis Foyatier (1793-1863), French sculptor
- Denis Franchi (born 2002), Italian professional footballer
- Denis Francoeur (born 1963), Canadian ice hockey coach
- Denis Franskevich (born 1981), Kazakhstani-Russian VHL player
- Denis-Luc Frayssinous (1765-1841), French prelate, statesman, orator, and writer
- Denis Furtună (born 1999), Moldovan professional footballer

== G ==
- Denis Galanin (born 1983), Russian video game developer and children's author
- Denis Galimzyanov (born 1987), Russian racing cyclist
- Denis Gallagher (1922-2001), Irish politician
- Denis Galloway (1878-1957), Scottish ethnographic artist and photographer
- Denis P. Galvin (born 1938), American career government administrator
- Denis Gankin (born 1989), Kazakhstani archer
- Denis Gargan (1819-1903), Irish Roman Catholic cleric and educator
- Denis Gargaud Chanut (born 1987), French slalom canoeist
- Denis Gariyev (born 1978), Russian far-right activist
- Denis Garon (born 1963), Canadian weightlifter
- Denis Garrett (1906-1989), British plant pathologist and mycologist
- Denis Gaté (born 1958), French rower
- Denis Gaultier (1597 or 1602/1603-1672), French lutenist and composer
- Denis Gauthier (born 1976), Canadian NHL player
- Denis Gavini (1820-1916), French politician
- Denis Genreau (born 1999), French-born Australian professional footballer
- Denis George (c. 1751-1821), Irish barrister and judge
- Denis Geppert (born 1976), German luger
- Denis Gerrard (1903-1965), British lawyer and judge
- Denis Gershun (born 1976), Russian professional football coach and player
- Denis Gerstorf, German psychologist
- Denis Gibbons (1932-2002), Australian folk musician, radio announcer, and musicologist
- Denis Dunbar Gibbs (1927-2015), English physician
- Denis Gifford (1927-2000), British writer, broadcaster, journalist, comic artist, and film-, comics-, television-, and radio historian
- Denis Giraudet (born 1955), French rally co-driver
- Denis Gizatullin (born 1983), Russian international motorcycle speedway rider
- Denis Glavina (born 1986), Croatian professional footballer
- Denis Gleeson (1896-1970), Australian rules footballer
- Denis Glennon, Irish Gaelic footballer
- Denis Glover (1912-1980), New Zealand poet and publisher
- Denis Glushakov (born 1987), Russian international footballer
- Denis Gnezdilov (born 1986), Russian Paralympic athlete
- Denis Goavec (born 1957), French footballer and manager
- Denis Godeas (born 1975), Italian footballer and current assistant coach
- Denis Godefroy (1549-1622), French jurist
- Denis Godla (born 1995), Slovak professional ice hockey player
- Denis Gojko (born 1998), Polish professional footballer
- Denis Goldberg (1933-2020), South African social campaigner
- Denis Goldring (1932–2024), British geologist
- Denis Golenko (born 1996), Belarusian professional footballer
- Denis Golovanov (born 1979), Russian professional tennis player
- Denis Goltsov (born 1990), Russian sambist and mixed martial arts fighter
- Denis Golubev (born 1991), Russian KHL player
- Denis Gomez (born 1991), Colombian professional footballer
- Denis V. Gonchar, Russian diplomat
- Denis Goodwin (1929-1975), English radio- and television comedy scriptwriter and actor
- Denis Gorbunov (1977-2006), Russian serial killer
- Denis Gorey (1874-1940), Irish politician
- Denis Gorin (1979–2024), Russian serial killer and cannibal
- Denis Gougeon (born 1951), Canadian composer and music educator
- Denis Goulet (1931-2006), French human development theorist
- Denis Grabe (born 1990), Estonian professional pool player
- Denis Grachev (disambiguation), several people
- Denis Coulthard Graham (1929-2002), British biological chemist
- Denis Granečný (born 1998), Czech professional footballer
- Denis Grant King (1903-1994), English archaeological draftsman, artist, historic monument conservation campaigner, and archaeologist
- Denis Granville (1637-1703), English non-juring cleric
- Denis Gratias (born 1947), French scientist and emeritus research director
- Denis Grbić (born 1986), Slovenian footballer
- Denis Grebeshkov (born 1983), Russian KHL and NHL player
- Denis Grechikho (born 1999), Belarusian professional footballer
- Denis Greenhill, Baron Greenhill of Harrow (1913-2000), British diplomat and officer
- Denis Gremelmayr (born 1981), German inactive tennis player
- Denis Grgic (born 1991), German professional footballer
- Denis Gribanov (born 1986), Russian sailor
- Denis Griffiths (1922-2001), Welsh operatic tenor
- Denis Grimes (1864-1920), Irish sportsperson
- Denis Grondin (born 1954), Canadian Roman Catholic prelate
- Denis Grot (born 1984), Belarusian VHL and NHL player
- Denis Gruzhevsky (born 2000), Belarusian professional footballer
- Denis Gudayev (born 1991), Russian professional footballer
- Denis Guedj (1940-2010), French novelist and science professor
- Denis Gulin, Russian Paralympic athlete
- Denis Gurdzhi (born 2003), German figure skater
- Denis Gurianov (born 1997), Russian NHL player
- Denis Gusev (born 1981), Russian professional bodybuilder
- Denis Gusev (politician) (born 1976), Russian politician
- Denis Guye (1901-1986), English rower
- Denis Guyer (born 1966), American politician
- Denis Rolleston Gwynn (1893-1973), Irish journalist, writer, history professor, and British Army personnel

== H ==
- Denis Haines (born 1957), English musician
- Denis Halilović (born 1986), Slovenian footballer
- Denis Hall, British physicist, laser researcher, and academic
- Denis Hall (bishop) (1899-1983), British Anglican colonial bishop
- Denis Hallett (1922-2013), British weightlifter
- Denis Halliday (born c. 1941), Irish diplomat
- Denis Hallinan (1849-1923), Irish Roman Catholic bishop
- Denis Hamel (born 1977), Canadian NHL player
- Denis Hamilton (1918-1988), English newspaper editor
- Denis Hamlett (born 1969), Costa Rican-American APSL player and current coach
- Denis Handlin (born 1951), Australian entrepreneur and business executive
- Denis Hanley (1903-1980), British electrical engineer and politician
- Denis Hanrahan (1933-1987), New Zealand Roman Catholic bishop
- Denis Hardy (disambiguation), several people
- Denis Hart (born 1941), Australian Roman Catholic prelate
- Denis Haruț (born 1999), Romanian professional footballer
- Denis Harvey (1929-2003), Canadian journalist and television executive
- Denis Haughey (born 1944), Irish politician
- Denis Haydon (1930-1988), British biophysicist and academic
- Denis Hayes (born 1944), American environmentalist and Earth Day founder
- Denis A. Hayes (1860-1917), American labor union leader
- Denis Haynes (1923-2012), English cricketer
- Denis Heagney (1898-1942), Australian rules footballer
- Denis Healey (1917-2015), British politician
- Denis Healy (Irish politician), Irish politician
- Denis Heaslip (1933-2020), Irish hurler
- Denis Hegarty (1912-1998), South African sailor
- Denis Hempson (c. 1695-1807), Irish harper
- Denis Hendren (1882-1962), English cricketer and umpire
- Denis Hennequin (born 1958), French businessman, entrepreneur, and administrator
- Denis Henrion (17th century), French mathematician
- Denis Henriquez (born 1945), Aruban writer
- Denis Henry (disambiguation), several people
- Denis Herard (1944–2023), Canadian politician
- Denis Hergheligiu (born 1999), Romanian professional footballer
- Denis Caulfield Heron (1824-1881), Irish lawyer and politician
- Denis Héroux (1940-2015), Canadian film director and producer
- Denis Herron (born 1952), Canadian NHL player
- Denis Heskin (1899-1975), Irish politician
- Denis Hickey (born 1964), Australian cricketer
- Denis Hickie (born 1976), Irish professional rugby union player
- Denis J. Hickie (1943-2021), Irish rugby union player
- Denis Higgs (1932-2011), British mathematician and mathematic doctor- and professor
- Denis Hills (1913-2004), British author, teacher, traveler, and adventurer
- Denis Hill-Wood (1906-1982), English football chairman and cricketer
- Denis Hinton (born 1939), Australian politician
- Denis Hollenstein (born 1989), Swiss NL player
- Denis Hollywood (born 1944), Scottish footballer
- Denis Horgan (1871-1922), Irish shot putter
- Denis Horník (born 1997), Slovak footballer
- Denis Houf (1932-2012), Belgian international footballer
- Denis Houle, Canadian actor
- Denis Howe (1928-2020), English footballer
- Denis Howe (editor), British editor
- Denis Howell (1923-1998), British politician
- Denis Hrezdac (born 2001), Romanian professional footballer
- Denis M. Hughes, American reserve system director
- Denis Hughson (born 1944), former Australian rules footballer
- Denis Huisman (1929–2021), French academic and writer
- Denis Hunt (1937–2019), English professional footballer
- Denis Hurley (disambiguation), several people
- Denis Huseinbašić (born 2001), professional footballer
- Denis Hutchinson (born 1932), former South African professional golfer

== I ==
- Denis Iartsev (born 1990), Russian judoka
- Denis Ignashin (born 1988), Russian VHL player
- Denis Iguma (born 1994), Ugandan professional footballer
- Denis Ilescu (born 1987), Moldovan footballer
- Denis Inkin (born 1978), Russian professional boxer
- Denis Ireland (1894-1974), Irish essayist and political activist
- Denis Irwin (born 1965), Irish footballer and sports television presenter
- Denis Ispas (born 1993), Romanian professional footballer
- Denis Istomin (born 1986), Uzbek professional tennis player
- Denis Istomin (ice hockey) (born 1987), Russian NHL player
- Denis Ivanov (disambiguation), several people

== J ==
- Denis Jachiet (born 1962), French Catholic prelate
- Denis Jack (born 1941), Scottish professional footballer
- Denis Jacquat (born 1944), French politician
- Denis James (1895-1965), English Archdeacon of Barnstaple
- Denis Jamet (?-1625), French Roman Catholic missionary in Canada
- Denis Jančo (born 1997), Slovak footballer
- Denis Janot (fl. 1529-1544), French printer and bookseller
- Denis Jäpel (born 1998), German footballer
- Denis Jeambar (born 1948), French journalist
- Denis Jenkinson (1920-1996), British sports journalist
- Denis Jérome (born 1939), French experimental physicist
- Denis Jeršov (1966-2017), Lithuanian engineer and oil and gas entrepreneur
- Denis Johansson (1928-1991), Finnish middle-distance runner
- Denis Johnson (1949-2017), American novelist, short-story writer, and poet
- Denis Johnson (inventor) (c. 1760-1833), English coachmaker and pioneer bicycle-maker
- Denis Johnston (1901-1984), Irish writer, war correspondent, and radio and TV producer
- Denis Jones (1906-1987), Irish politician
- Denis Jordan (1914-1982), Anglo-Australian chemist
- Denis Joseph (born 1958), South African politician
- Denis Jourdanet (1815-1892), French physician and physiologist
- Denis Julien (c. 1772-?), American fur trader and explorer of French-Canadian Huguenot origin
- Denis Juneau (1925-2014), Canadian painter, sculptor, and designer
- Dênis Júnior (born 1998), Brazilian footballer

== K ==
- Denis Kadrić (born 1995), German-born chess player representing Montenegro
- Denis Kaliberda (born 1990), German volleyball player of Ukrainian descent
- Denis Kalinin (born 1980), Russian robber and serial killer
- Denis Kang (born 1977), Canadian professional mixed martial artist
- Denis Kapustin (disambiguation), multiple people
- Denis Karić (born 1972), Bosnian footballer
- Denis Kartsev (born 1976), Russian KHL player
- Denis Karyagin (born 2002), Bulgarian professional volleyball player
- Denis Katsyv, Ukrainian-, Russian-, and Israeli businessman
- Denis Kavlinov (born 1995), Russian footballer
- Denis Kaykov (born 1997), Russian footballer
- Denis Kazionov (born 1987), Russian KHL and NHL player
- Denis Kazungu (born c. 1989), Rwandan serial killer
- Denis Kearney (1846/1847/1848-1907), Irish-born American anti-capitalist, drayman, and labor organizer
- Denis Keefe (born 1958), British diplomat and ambassador to Serbia
- Denis Keegan (1924-1993), British barrister and company manager
- Denis Kelleher (1931-2002), Irish Gaelic footballer
- Denis Kelly (bishop) (1852-1924), Irish Roman Catholic bishop
- Denis Kendall (1903-1995), English engineer, businessman, and politician
- Denis Kenzo (born 1989), Russian DJ and music producer
- Denis Keogh (1838-1911), Irish-born Australian storekeeper and politician
- Denis Kessler (1952–2023), French businessman
- Denis Kevans (1939-2005), Australian poet, songwriter, and folk singer
- Denis Khismatullin (born 1984), Russian chess grandmaster
- Denis Khlopotnov (born 1978), Russian NHL player
- Denis Khlystov (born 1979), Russian KHL player
- Denis Khodykin (born 1999), Russian pair skater
- Denis Kiggundu (born 2000), Ugandan footballer
- Denis Kilbride (1848-1924), Irish politician
- Denis Kina (born 1992), German footballer
- Denis Kinane (born 1957), Scottish immunologist, cell biologist, and infection-, immunity-, and genomics specialist
- Denis Kinchela (born c. 1965), Australian rugby league footballer
- Denis Kindl (born 1992), Czech professional ice hockey player
- Denis King (born 1939), English composer and singer
- Denis Kipkoech (born 2006), Kenyan runner
- Denis Kirilenko (born 1984), Russian professional footballer
- Denis Kiselyov (born 1978), Russian professional football coach and player
- Denis Kitchen (born 1946), American underground cartoonist, publisher, author, agent, and CBLDF founder
- Denis Kiwanuka Lote (1938-2022), Ugandan Roman Catholic prelate
- Denis Klinar (born 1992), Slovenian footballer
- Denis Klobučar (born 1983), Croatian cross-country skier
- Denis Klopkov (born 1986), Russian professional footballer
- Denis Klyuyev (born 1973), Russian football manager and player
- Denis Kniga (born 1992), Russian professional footballer
- Denis Knitel (born 1977), Tajikistani professional footballer
- Denis Koberskiy (born 1974), Russian footballer
- Denis Kochetkov (born 1980), Russian KHL player
- Denis Kokarev (born 1985), Russian VHL player
- Denis Kolinger (born 1994), German-born Romanian professional footballer
- Denis Kolodin (born 1982), Russian football coach and player
- Denis Komivi Amuzu-Dzakpah (born 1943), Togolese Roman Catholic bishop
- Denis Kondakov (born 1978), Russian professional footballer
- Denis Koretskiy (born 1976), Russian footballer
- Denis Kornilov (born 1986), Russian ski jumper
- Denis Kopotun (born 1996), Canadian YouTuber
- Denis Borisovich Korolyov (born 1987), Russian professional footballer
- Denis Kostin (born 1995), Russian KHL player
- Denis Kostrzhevskiy (born 1968), Ukrainian businessman
- Denis Koval (born 1991), Russian speed skater
- Denis Kovalevich (born 2003), Belarusian professional footballer
- Denis Kozhukhin (born 1986), Russian pianist
- Denis Kozlov (disambiguation), several people
- Denis Kramar (born 1991), Slovenian footballer
- Denis Kravchenko (born 1976), Russian politician
- Denis Kravtsov (born 1990), Russian footballer
- Denis Krestinin (born 1994), Lithuanian basketball player
- Denis Krivoshlykov (born 1971), Russian team handball player
- Denis Krivushkin (born 1978), Kazakhstani cross-country skier
- Denis Kudla (born 1992), American professional tennis player
- Denis Kudla (wrestler) (born 1994), German Greco-Roman wrestler
- Denis Kudryavtsev (born 1992), Russian athlete
- Denis Kulakov (disambiguation), several people
- Denis Kulbayev (born 1975), Tajikistani footballer
- Denis Kulikov (born 2004), Israeli footballer
- Denis Kuljiš (1951-2019), Croatian writer, entrepreneur, and journalist
- Denis Kulyash (born 1983), Russian NHL player
- Denis Kurepanov (born 1988), Russian KHL player
- Denis Kurian (born 1984), Belarusian journalist and television presenter
- Denis Kutin (born 1993), Russian footballer
- Denis Kuzin (born 1989), Kazakhstani speed skater
- Denis Kwok (born 1990), Hong Kong member of Cantopop boy band Error

== L ==
- Denis La Fontaine (1929-2011), Indian aviator
- Denis Labryga (born 1996), Polish mixed martial artist
- Denis Laktionov (born 1977), Russian footballer
- Denis Lalanne (1926-2019), French sports journalist
- Denis Lalor, Irish hurler and footballer
- Denis Lamb (born 1937), American career diplomat
- Denis Lambert (born 1961), Canadian boxer
- Denis Lambin (1520-1572), French classical scholar
- Denis Lamothe, Canadian politician
- Denis Lamoureux (born 1954), Canadian evangelical, academic, theologian, and theistic evolutionist
- Denis Landry (born 1957), Canadian mayor
- Denis Landy (born 1962), Irish politician
- Denis Langaskens (born 1966), Belgian professional tennis player
- Denis Langlois (race walker) (born 1968), French race walker
- Denis Langlois (director), Canadian director, screenwriter, producer, actor, and editor
- Denis Lanigan (1874-1933), Australian rules footballer
- Denis Lapaczinski (born 1981), German professional footballer and manager
- Denis Lapalme (1959–2021), Canadian amputee athlete and actor
- Denis Laptev (born 1991), Belarusian footballer
- Denis Larkin (1908–1987), Irish politician and trade union official
- Denis Larocque (born 1967), Canadian NHL player
- Denis Laskey (1916–1987), British ambassador to Romania and Austria
- Denis Lathoud (1966–2025), French handball player and coach
- Denis Latin (born 1966), Croatian television host
- Denis Lavagne (born 1964), French football coach and player
- Denis Lavant (born 1961), French actor
- Denis Law (1940–2025), Scottish footballer
- Denis Lawson (born 1947), Scottish actor and director
- Denis Lawson (footballer) (1897–1968), Scottish footballer
- Denis Lazavik (born 2006), Belarusian chess grandmaster
- Denis Lazure (1925–2008), Canadian psychiatrist and politician
- Denis Le Bihan (born 1957), French medical doctor, physicist, and academy director
- Denis Le Grant (?-1352), French composer
- Denis Le Marchant (1795-1874), British barrister, civil servant, writer, and politician
- Denis-Nicolas Le Nourry (1647-1724), French Benedictine scholar
- Denis Le Saint, French businessman
- Denis Leamy (born 1981), Irish rugby union player and current coach
- Denis Leary (born 1957), American actor and comedian
- Denis Lebedev (born 1979), Russian boxer
- Denis Lebel (born 1954), Canadian politician
- Denis Lebrun (born 1958), American comic artist (Blondie strip)
- Denis Legersky (born 1987), Slovak ice hockey player and coach
- Denis Lemeunier (born 1965), French wheelchair racer
- Denis Lemieux (born 1964), Canadian politician
- Denis Lenaghan (born 1956), Australian footballer
- Denis Leng (1934-2020), English cricketer
- Denis Lenoir (born 1949), French cinematographer
- Denis LePage, Canadian member of disco band Lime (band)
- Denis Leproux (born 1964), French racing cyclist
- Denis Leushin (born 1985), Russian competitive figure skater
- Denis Levaillant (born 1952), French composer, pianist, and writer
- Denis Levitsky (born 1997), Belarusian professional footballer
- Denis Lhuillier (born 1973), French football manager and player
- Denis Lian (born 1972), Singaporean race car driver
- Denis Lidjan (born 1993), Slovenian footballer
- Denis Lill (born 1942), New Zealand-born British actor
- Denis G. Lillie (1884-1963), British biologist
- Dénis Lindbohm (1927-2005), Swedish author and occultist
- Denis Lindsay (disambiguation), several people
- Denis Linsmayer (born 1991), German professional footballer
- Denis Ljubović (born 1988), Croatian footballer
- Denis Loginov (born 1985), Russian NHL player
- Denis Loktev (born 2000), Israeli swimmer
- Denis Lortie (born 1959), Canadian corporal
- Denis Losier (born 1952), Canadian businessman, economist, public servant, and politician
- Denis Losnikov (born 1994), Estonian volleyball player
- Denis Loubet, digital artist
- Denis Love (1955-2012), Scottish international lawn bowler
- Denis Lovegrove (1904-1979), Australian politician
- Denis Matthew Lowney (1863-1918), Irish-born American Roman Catholic prelate
- Denis Jean Achille Luchaire (1846-1908), French historian
- Denis Lukyanov (born 1989), Russian athletics competitor
- Denis Lunghi (born 1976), Italian professional racing cyclist
- Denis Lutge (1879-1953), Australian pioneer rugby league- and rugby union player
- Denis Lyamin (born 1979), Russian lieutenant general
- Denis Lynch (born 1976), Irish show jumper
- Denis Lyons (1935-2014), Irish politician

== M ==
- Denis Maccan (born 1984), Italian footballer
- Denis Florence MacCarthy (1817-1882), Irish poet, translator, and biographer
- Denis MacEoin (1949-2022), British academic, scholar, and writer
- Denis Machuel (born 1964), French business executive
- Denis Mackail (1892-1971), English fiction writer
- Denis Mackey (1934-1990), Australian medical practitioner
- Denis MacShane (born 1948), British politician, author, and commentator
- Denis Madden (born 1948), Irish police officer and recipient of the Scott Medal
- Denis J. Madden (born 1940), American Roman Catholic prelate
- Denis Maffey (1922-1995), English footballer
- Denis Magadiyev (born 1992), Russian professional footballer
- Denis Maguire (1721-1798), Irish Roman Catholic churchman
- Denis Maher (born 1991), Irish hurler
- Denis Mahmudov (born 1989), Macedonian footballer
- Denis Mahon (1910-2011), British collector and art historian
- Denis Mahon (British Army officer) (1787-1847), Irish landlord
- Denis Mahony (1928-2017), Irish Gaelic footballer
- Denis Maidanov (born 1976), Russian singer, songwriter, actor, and politician
- Denis Makarov (born 1998), Russian professional footballer
- Denis Makarov (ice hockey) (born 1983), Russian ice hockey player
- Denis Makhnev (born 2000), Kazakhstani chess grandmaster
- Denis Malgin (born 1997), Swiss NHL player
- Denis Malinin (born 1983), Kazakhstani professional footballer
- Denis Malone (1922-2000), British jurist in the Caribbean
- Denis Mandarino (born 1964), Brazilian composer, artist, and writer
- Denis Mbuyu Manga (born 1939), Congolese politician
- Denis Mangafic (born 1989), German footballer
- Denis Mann (born 1935), Scottish glass artist
- Denis Manturov (born 1969), Russian politician
- Denis Marandici (born 1996), Moldovan footballer
- Denis Marconato (born 1975), Italian LBA player
- Denis Margalik (born 1997), Argentine figure skater
- Dênis Marinho (born 1963), Brazilian rower
- Denis Marion (1906-2000), Belgian journalist and chess player
- Denis Markaj (born 1991), Kosovan-Swiss professional footballer
- Denis Marleau (born 1954), Canadian director
- Denis-Simon de Marquemont (1572-1626), French cleric
- Dênis Marques (born 1981), Brazilian footballer
- Denis Márquez Lebrón, Puerto Rican politician
- Denis Marshall (disambiguation), several people
- Denis Martin (1920-1988), Northern Irish singer, actor, and theater producer
- Denis-Constant Martin (born 1947), French scholar
- Denis Martínez Roque (born 1990), Cuban dancer and choreographer
- Dénis Martins (born 1997), Portuguese professional footballer
- Denis Mashkarin (born 1973), Russian professional footballer
- Denis Mashkin (born 1996), Russian footballer
- Denis Masi (born 1942), British artist
- Denis Masséglia (born 1981), French politician
- Denis Mast (born 1941), Swiss cross-country skier
- Denis Matiola (born 1978), Russian professional footballer
- Denis Matrosov (born 1972), Russian actor
- Denis Matsuev (born 1975), Russian classical pianist and jazz performer
- Denis Matsukevich (born 1986), Russian professional tennis player
- Denis Matthews (1919-1988), English pianist and musicologist
- Denis Matveev (born 1983), Russian cosmonaut
- Denis Matyugin (born 1992), Russian footballer
- Denis Maydanov (born 1976), Russian singer, songwriter, actor, and politician
- Denis McBride (disambiguation), several people
- Denis McCullough (1883-1968), Irish politician
- Denis McDaid (1899-1981), Irish Roman Catholic clergyman
- Denis McDonald, Irish lawyer and judge
- Denis McDonough (born 1969), American politician, appointed President Obama's second-term Chief of Staff
- Denis McFadden (born 1946), Australian hairdresser-turned-businessman and entrepreneur
- Denis McGrath (1968-2017), Canadian-American screenwriter and producer
- Denis McGrath (lawyer) (1910-1986), New Zealand politician and lawyer
- Denis McKey (1910-1982), Australian VFL player
- Denis McLaughlin (born 1987), Irish professional association footballer
- Denis McLean (1930-2011), New Zealand diplomat, academic, author, and civil servant
- Denis McLoughlin (1918-2002), British illustrator
- Denis McNamara (1926-2009), British wrestler
- Denis McQuade (born 1951), Scottish footballer
- Denis McQuail (1935-2017), British communication theorist and emeritus professor
- Denis McSwiney, Singaporean architect
- Denis Meaney (1936-2011), Australian professional rugby league footballer
- Denis Mehigan (1890-1959), Irish Gaelic footballer
- Denis Meléndez (born 1995), Honduran professional footballer
- Denis Meloche (born 1952), Canadian WHA and NHL player
- Denis Menchov (born 1978), Russian professional road bicycle racer
- Denis Menke (1940-2020), American MLB player and coach
- Denis Ménochet (born 1976), French actor
- Denis Mercier (born 1959), French military officer
- Denis Mesples (born 1963), French equestrian
- Denis Mesritz (1919-1945), Dutch lawyer
- Denis Metlyuk (born 1972), Russian RSL and NHL player
- Denis Michaud (born 1946), Canadian luger
- Denis Mickiewicz (born 1929), Russian conductor and professor emeritus of Russian literature
- Denis Miéville (1946-2018), Swiss logic expert
- Denis Mihai (born 2003), Romanian Greco-Roman wrestler
- Denis Mijatović (born 1983), Croatian futsal player
- Denís Milar (born 1952), Uruguayan footballer
- Denis Miller (1918-2009), New Zealand bomber and airline pilot
- Denis Mitchell (disambiguation), several people
- Denis Mitchison (1919-2018), British bacteriologist
- Denis Moiseychenkov (born 1986), Russian bobsledder
- Denis Mojstrovič (born 1986), Slovenian footballer
- Denis Moloney (born 1954), Irish solicitor, lawyer, and academic
- Denis Rolando Moncada Colindres, Nicaraguan lawyer and diplomat
- Denis Mondor, Canadian judge and lawyer
- Denis Monette (1936–2023), Canadian journalist and author
- Denis Moore (cricketer) (1910-2003), English cricketer
- Denis Moore (American football) (1944–1995)
- Dennis Moran (disambiguation), several people
- Denis Moreau (born 1967), French philosopher
- Denis Morel (born 1948), Canadian NHL referee
- Denis Morozov (born 1973), Russian businessman
- Denis Mosalev (born 1986), Russian KHL player
- Denis Moschitto (born 1977), German actor
- Denis Moynihan (1885–1975), Roman Catholic bishop
- Denis Muhović (born 1976), Bosnian karate competitor and coach
- Denis Mujkić (born 1983), Bosnian footballer
- Denis Mukwege (born 1955), Congolese gynecologist and pastor
- Denis Mulcahy (born 1956), Irish hurler
- Denis Dowling Mulcahy (1833-1900), Irish criminal and medical doctor
- Denis Murphy (disambiguation), several people
- Denis Murray (disambiguation), several people
- Denis Mustafaraj (born 1986), Albanian footballer
- Denis Myšák (born 1995), Slovak sprint canoeist

== N ==
- Denis Naegelen (born 1952), French professional tennis player
- Denis Napthine (born 1952), Australian politician
- Denis Nash, American epidemiologist
- Denis Naughten (born 1973), Irish politician
- Denis Navarro (born 1987), Brazilian auto racing driver
- Denis Neale (born 1944), English international table tennis player
- Denis Nekrasov (cyclist) (born 1997), Russian cyclist
- Denis Nekrasov (Russian nationalist) (1985–2022), Russian nationalist
- Denis Nesci (born 1981), Italian politician
- Denis Nevedrov (born 1994), Russian futsal player
- Denis Neves (born 1990), Brazilian footballer
- Denis Neville (1915-1995), English footballer and manager
- Denis Nikisha (born 1995), Kazakh short track speed skater
- Denis Nikitin (born 1997), Russian footballer
- Denis Nikonorov (born 2004), Russian football player
- Denis Nizhegorodov (born 1980), Russian race walker
- Denis Noble (born 1936), British biologist
- Denis Norden (1922-2018), English comedy writer and television presenter
- Denis Norman (1931-2019), British-Zimbabwean politician
- Denis Novato (born 1976), Slovene musician and champion accordion player
- Denis Nsanzamahoro (died 2019), Rwandan actor and filmmaker
- Denis Nulty (born 1963), Irish Roman Catholic prelate
- Denis Kalume Numbi, Congolese general and politician
- Denis Nya (born 1996), Nigerian professional footballer
- Denis Nyangweso (born 1978), Ugandan politician
- Denis Nyhan (1939-2021), New Zealand harness racer
- Denis Nzioka (born 1985), Kenyan sexual- and gender minority activist-author

== O ==
- Denis Obua (disambiguation), several people
- Denis O'Brien (disambiguation), several people
- Denis O'Callaghan (Australian rules footballer) (born 1949), Australian footballer
- Denis O'Callaghan (rugby league) (1939-2017), Australian rugby league footballer
- Denis J. O'Connell (1849-1927), Irish-born American Roman Catholic bishop
- Denis Ó Connmhaigh (15th century), Irish Roman Catholic clergyman and bishop
- Denis O'Connor (disambiguation), several people
- Denis O'Conor Don (1912-2000), British Army personnel
- Denis Maurice O'Conor (1840-1883), Irish barrister and politician
- Denis O'Cullean (14th century), Irish Roman Catholic priest
- Denis O'Dea (1905-1978), Irish stage- and film actor
- Denis O'Dell (1923-2021), British film producer
- Denis Odoi (born 1988), Belgian professional footballer
- Denis O'Donaghue (1848-1925), American Roman Catholic bishop
- Denis O'Donnell (1875-1933), Irish entrepreneur
- Denis O'Donovan (born 1955), Irish politician
- Denis O'Driscoll (born 1952), Irish Gaelic footballer
- Denis O'Dwyer, Irish footballer
- Denis O'Gorman (disambiguation), multiple people
- Denis O'Hare (born 1962), American actor, singer, and author
- Denis O'Hearn, American sociology- and anthropology professor
- Denis O'Keeffe, Irish sportsperson
- Denis O'Leary (1863-1943), American educator, lawyer, and politician
- Denis Olegov (born 1998), Bulgarian writer and journalist of Russian descent
- Denis Olivera (born 1999), Uruguayan footballer
- Denis Omedi (born 1994), Ugandan footballer
- Denis Omerbegović (born 1986), Bosnian-Herzegovinian professional footballer
- Denis O'Miachain (?-1285), Irish Roman Catholic priest, and Archdeacon of Achonry
- Denis O'Mulkyran (?-1224), Irish Roman Catholic priest, and Archdeacon of Ardcarne
- Denis O'Neil (born 1936), Australian sailor
- Denis Onyango (born 1985), Ugandan professional footballer
- Denis O'Regan (born 1953), English photographer
- Denis O'Regan (jockey) (born 1982), Irish jockey
- Denis O'Riordan (born 1941), Irish hurler
- Denis Ormerod (1922-2005), British Army soldier
- Denis O'Rourke (born 1946), New Zealand politician
- Denis Örs (born 2005), Russia-born Turkish short track speed skater
- Denis Osadchenko (born 1990), Ukrainian-German footballer
- Denis Osborne (1932-2014), British diplomat and academic
- Denis Osin, American mathematician
- Denis Osipau (born 1983), Belarusian freestyle skier
- Denis Osipov (born 1987), Russian-born Chinese KHL player
- Denis Osokin (born 2002), Russian footballer
- Denis Ostier (born 1993), French actor
- Denis O'Sullivan (disambiguation), several people
- Denis Oswald (disambiguation), several people
- Denis J. Oullahan (1824-1889), American politician
- Denis Ovens (born 1957), English professional darts player
- Denis Owen (1931-1996), British ecologist, naturalist, author, broadcaster, and teacher

== P ==
- Denis Pack (1775-1823), Anglo-Irish military officer
- Denis Pack-Beresford (disambiguation), several people
- Denis Pagan (born 1947), Australian footballer and coach
- Denis Pain (1936-2019), New Zealand jurist and sports administrator
- Denis Pankratov (born 1974), Russian swimmer
- Denis-Pierre-Jean Papillon de la Ferté (1727-1794), French civil servant, art connoisseur, theater manager, producer, and theater manager
- Denis Papin (1647-1713), French physicist, mathematician, and inventor
- Denis-Benjamin Papineau (1789-1854), Canadian merchant, seigneur, and bookseller
- Denis-Émery Papineau (1819-1899), Canadian notary and political figure
- Denis Paradis (born 1949), Canadian politician and lawyer
- Denis Parfenov (born 1987), Russian political figure and deputy
- Denis Parkinson (1915-2004), English motorcycle road racer
- Denis Parshin (born 1986), Russian NHL player
- Denis Alva Parsons (1934-2012), English sculptor and carver
- Denis Pasler (born 1978), Russian statesman and politician
- Denis Pätoprstý (born 1997), Slovak professional ice hockey player
- Denis Patry (born 1953), Canadian ice hockey player
- Denis Pauli (born 1978), German politician
- Denis Payton (1943-2006), English musician and member of the Dave Clark Five
- Denis Pchelintsev (born 1979), Russian professional football coach and player
- Denis Pearce (1896-1968), British fencer
- Denis Péc (1220s-1280s), Hungarian baron and soldier
- Denis Pederson (born 1975), Canadian NHL player
- Denis Peel (1886-1927), English cricketer
- Denis Pelizzari (born 1960), French cyclist
- Denis Pelli (born 1954), American psychology professor and scientist
- Denis Peploe (1914-1993), Scottish artist and sculptor
- Denis Peposhi (born 1995), Albanian professional footballer
- Denis Pereira Gray (born 1935), British general practitioner
- Denis Peremenin (born 1976), Russian footballer
- Denis Perera (1930-2013), Sri Lanka Army 8th Commander
- Denis Perez (born 1965), French ice hockey player and coach
- Denis Perger (born 1993), Slovenian professional footballer
- Denis Periša (born 1983), Croatian political activist, whistle blower, and computer hacker
- Denis Perron (1938-1997), Canadian politician
- Denis Pervushin (born 1977), Russian professional football coach and player
- Denis Pétau (1583-1652), French Jesuit theologian
- Denis Peterson (born 1944), American hyperrealist painter
- Denis Petrashov (born 2000), Kyrgyzstani swimmer
- Denis Petrić (born 1988), Slovenian professional footballer of Serbian descent
- Denis Petro (born 1999), Slovak professional footballer
- Denis Petrov (born 1968), Russian pair skater
- Denis Pettiaux (born 1956), Belgian acrobat and referee
- Denis Petukhov (born 1978), Russian-American ice dancer
- Denis Petushinskiy (born 1967), Russian-New Zealand pole vaulter
- Denis Phipps (born 1985), Dominican MLB player
- Denis Pidev (born 1992), Bulgarian footballer
- Denis Piel (born 1944), French photographer and filmmaker
- Denis Pigott (born 1946), Australian equestrian
- Denis Pimankov (born 1975), Russian swimmer
- Denis Pineda (born 1995), Salvadoran professional footballer
- Denis Pinto (born 1995), Costa Rican-born Bolivian footballer
- Denis Pirie, British politician
- Denis Pischikov (born 1983), Russian robber and serial killer
- Denis Pittard (born 1945), Australian rugby league footballer
- Denis Pitts (1930-1994), English journalist, filmmaker, and novelist
- Denis Pjeshka (born 1995), Albanian footballer
- Denis Platonov (born 1981), Russian NHL player
- Denis Podalydès (born 1963), French actor and scriptwriter of Greek descent
- Denis-Will Poha (born 1997), French professional footballer
- Denis Polyakov (born 1991), Belarusian professional footballer
- Denis Popov (born 1979), Russian association football manager and player
- Denis Popov (footballer, born 2002) (born 2002), Russian footballer
- Denis Popović (born 1989), Slovenian professional footballer
- Denis Potoma (born 2000), Slovak professional footballer
- Denis Potvin (born 1953), Canadian NHL player
- Denis Poyarkov (born 1989), Russian professional footballer
- Denis Pozder (born 1989), Bosnian-German professional footballer
- Denis Pratten, British international rugby union player
- Denis Preston (1916-1979), British record producer, recording studio owner, radio presenter, and music critic
- Denis Price (1908-1966), British Army general
- Denis Prieur (disambiguation), several people
- Denis Pritt (1887-1972), British barrister and politician
- Denis Prokopenko (born 1991), Kazakh footballer
- Denis Pronovost (born 1953), Canadian radio host, journalist, and politician
- Denis Pushilin (born 1981), Ukrainian politician, head of the Donetsk People's Republic
- Denis Fernand Py (1887-1949), French sculptor, medal artist, and engraver
- Denis Pyramus (12th- and 13th century), Benedictine monk and poet

== Q ==
- Denis Quilley (1927-2003), English actor and singer

== R ==
- Denis Radu (born 2003), Romanian footballer
- Denis Railton (1940–2023), Australian rules footballer
- Denis Rake (1901–1976), British secret agent
- Denis Rampersad (born 1974), Trinidadian cricketer
- Denis Rancourt (born 1957), Canadian physics professor
- Denis Ranque (born 1952), French engineer and businessman
- Denis Rassulov (born 1990), Moldovan footballer
- Denis Rathbone (1912-1991), English track and field athlete
- Denis Rearden (c. 1810-1885), Irish politician
- Denis Reardon (1917–2010), Welsh boxer
- Denis Redman (1910-2009), British Army officer
- Denis Reggie, American wedding photographer
- Denis Rehák (born 1985), Slovak NHL player
- Denis Reidy, Irish Gaelic footballer
- Denis Renaud (born 1974), French football manager
- Denis Rența (born 2004), Romanian footballer
- Denis Retaillé (born 1953), French geography professor
- Denis Reul (born 1989), German DEL player
- Denis de la Reussille (born 1960), Swiss politician
- Denis Rey (born 1966), French alpine skier
- Denis Reynolds, Australian magistrate and judge
- Denis Rice (born 1958), Irish rower
- Denis Rich (born 1954), Australian AFL umpire
- Denis Richards (1910-2004), British historian
- Denis Rickett (1907-1997), British civil servant
- Denis Ring (1897-1977), Irish hurler
- Denis Ristov (born 1990), Serbian footballer
- Denis Rivière (1945-2020), French painter
- Denis Rixson (1918-1994), British Royal Air Force officer
- Denis Robert (born 1958), French investigative journalist, novelist, and filmmaker
- Denis Robin (disambiguation), several people
- Denis Rocan (born 1949), Canadian politician
- Denis Rodier, Canadian comic book illustrator
- Denis Rodionov (born 1985), Kazakh footballer
- Denis Rodríguez (born 1996), Argentine footballer
- Denis Rogers (1917-1987), New Zealand doctor and politician
- Denis Michael Rohan (1941–2013), Australian arsonist
- Denis Romanenco (born 1974), Moldovan footballer
- Denis Rooke (1924-2008), English industrialist and engineer
- Denis Rose (1922-1984), English jazz pianist and trumpeter
- Denis Rose (athlete) (born 1959), Seychellois sprinter
- Denis Lerrer Rosenfield (born 1950), Brazilian writer and columnist
- Denis de Rougemont (1906-1985), Swiss writer and cultural theorist
- Denis Rouleau, Canadian Royal Canadian Navy officer
- Denis Rousseau, American scientist and professor
- Denis Roux (born 1961), French cyclist
- Denis Ruddy (born 1950), Scottish footballer
- Denis Rugovac (born 1993), Czech road and track cyclist
- Denis Rukundo (born 1996), Rwandan professional footballer
- Denis Russell (1909-1986), English cricketer
- Denis Rustan (born 1983), Russian professional footballer
- Denis Rusu (disambiguation), several people
- Denis Ryan (disambiguation), several people

== S ==
- Denis Sadovsky (born 1997), Belarusian professional footballer
- Denis Saifutdinov (born 1981), Russian motorcycle speedway rider
- Denis Salagayev (born 1979), Russian snowboarder
- Denis de Sallo (1626-1669), French writer and lawyer
- Denis Eduardovich Samokhin (born 1977), Russian former competitive ice dancer, coach, and judge
- Denis Samoylov (born 1999), Russian footballer
- Denis Sampson, Irish-born Canadian writer and literary critic
- Denis Sanders (1929-1987), American film director, screenwriter, and producer
- Denis Sandona (born 1955), French biathlete
- Denis Santry (1879–1960), Irish architect and cartoonist
- Denis Santachiara, Italian designer
- Denis Sargan (1924-1996), British econometrician
- Denis Sassou Nguesso (born 1943), Congolese politician and military officer
- Denis-Christel Sassou Nguesso, Congolese politician
- Denis A. Saunders (born 1947), Australian ornithologist and conservationist
- Denis Saurat (1890-1958), Anglo-French scholar, writer, and broadcaster
- Denis Sauvage (1520-1587), French translator, historian, publisher, philologist, and historiographer
- Denis Savard (born 1961), Canadian NHL player
- Denis Savenkov (born 1983), Belarusian gymnast
- Denis Saverot, French journalist, author, and editor of French wine publications
- Denis Savin (born 1984), Russian ballet dancer
- Denis Savitsky (born 1998), Russian boxer
- Denis Sayers (born 1934), English cricketer
- Denis Scanlon (born 1954), Australian VFL player
- Denis Scannell, Irish sportsperson
- Denis Scheck (born 1964), German literary critic, journalist, television presenter, and translator
- Denis Scherbakov (born 1978), Belarusian professional football referee
- Denis Schneider (born 1946), French painter
- Denis Schuller (born 1948), Australian cricketer of German descent
- Denis Scuto (born 1964), Luxembourgish footballer
- Denis Šefik (born 1976), Serbian water polo player
- Denis Ségui Kragbé (1938-1998), Ivorian shot putter and discus thrower
- Denis Selimović (born 1979), Slovenian professional footballer
- Denis Selishchev (born 1994), Russian professional footballer
- Denis Semionov (born 1985), Russian new media artist
- Denis Sergeev (born 1982), Russian amateur boxer
- Denis Sergeev (GRU officer) (born 1973), Russian military officer
- Denis Serikov, Russian media manager and radio personality
- Denis Serre (born 1954), French mathematician and professor
- Denis Shafikov (born 1985), Russian professional boxer
- Denis Shanagher (born 1956), American international rugby union player
- Denis Shapovalov (born 1999), Israeli-Canadian tennis player
- Denis Shaw (1921-1971), British character actor
- Denis Shcherbak (born 1989), Russian professional footballer
- Denis Shcherbitsky (born 1996), Belarusian professional footballer
- Denis Shchetkin (born 1982), Kazakhstan footballer
- Denis Shebanov (born 1989), Russian professional association footballer
- Denis Shemelin (born 1978), Kazakhstani KHL player
- Denis Shepilov (born 2000), Russian footballer
- Denis Gem Shepstone (1888-1966), South African politician
- Denis Shevchuk (born 1992), Russian footballer
- Denis Shevelev (born 1981), Russian professional footballer
- Denis Shipwright (1898-1984), British soldier
- Denis Shishov, Russian major general
- Denis Shkarpeta (born 1981), Uzbekistani professional road cyclist
- Denis Shore (1915-1963), South African athlete
- Denis Shpakovsky (born 2001), Belarusian professional footballer
- Denis Shurshin (born 1989), Russian track cyclist
- Denis Shvedov (born 1981), Russian actor
- Denis Shvidki (born 1980), Ukrainian-born Russian NHL player
- Denis Silva (disambiguation), several people
- Denis Simachev (born 1974), Russian fashion designer and TV presenter
- Denis Simani (born 1991), Swiss-born Albanian footballer
- Denis Simard, Canadian candidate in the 2000 Canadian federal election
- Denis Simon, American professor and academic administrator
- Denis Simonet (born 1985), Swiss politician
- Denis Simplikevich (born 1991), Russian rugby union footballer
- Denis Simpson (1950-2010), Canadian actor and singer
- Denis Sinor (1916-2011), Hungarian-born American paleolinguist and historian
- Denis Sinyayev (born 1984), Russian professional footballer
- Denis Sire (1953-2019), French cartoonist
- Denis Skorokhodov (born 1981), Russian professional footballer
- Denis Smalley (born 1946), New Zealand composer and musician
- Denis Smallwood (1918-1997), British Royal Air Force commander
- Denis Šme (born 1994), Slovenian footballer
- Denis Smith (disambiguation), several people
- Denis Smyslov (born 1979), Russian professional cyclist
- Denis Snimshchikov (born 1975), Russian professional footballer
- Denis Sobolev (born 1993), Russian professional footballer
- Denis Sokolov (disambiguation), several people
- Denis Solovyov (born 1977), Russian professional football coach and player
- Denis Sommer (born 1957), French politician
- Denis Sonet (1926-2015), French Roman Catholic priest, chaplain, marriage counselor, and educator
- Denis Soskov (born 1977), Russian footballer
- Denis Souza Jr. (born 1998), Brazilian kickboxer
- Denis Soynikov (born 1986), Russian professional footballer
- Denis Špička (born 1988), Czech cyclist
- Denis Spirin (born 1980), Russian footballer
- Denis Spitsov (born 1996), Russian cross-country skier
- Denis Špoljarić (born 1979), Croatian handball player and current assistant coach
- Denis Spotswood (1916-2001), English Royal Air Force personnel
- Denis Ssebuggwawo Wasswa (1870-1886), Ugandan Catholic martyr and saint
- Denis Stairs (disambiguation), several people
- Denis Stasyuk (born 1985), Russian KHL and NHL player
- Denis Stevens (1922-2004), British musicologist
- Denis Stinat (born 1983), French association footballer
- Denis Stoff (born 1992), Ukrainian singer
- Denis Stoffels (c. 1570-1629), Dutch Bruges bishop
- Denis Štojs (born 1978), Slovenian motorcycle speedway rider
- Denis Stracqualursi (born 1987), Argentine footballer
- Denis Strauch (1937-1965), Australian VFL player
- Denis Streak (born 1949), Zimbabwean cricketer
- Denis Streker (born 1991), German footballer
- Denis Strelkov (born 1990), Russian racewalker
- Denis Suárez (born 1994), Spanish footballer
- Denis Sugrue (1927-2014), Irish rower
- Denis Sullivan (disambiguation), several people
- Denis Sutherland, New Zealand mayor
- Denis Švec (born 1996), Slovak footballer
- Denis Sverdlov (born 1978), British-based Russian businessman

== T ==
- Denis Taaffe (1759-1813), Irish political writer and historian
- Denis Tabako (born 1974), Belarusian rower
- Denis Tahirović (born 1985), Croatian footballer
- Denis Talalay (born 1992), Russian footballer
- Denis Martin Tapsoba (1916-2008), Burkinabe Roman Catholic bishop
- Denis Tarasov (born 1993), Russian Paralympic swimmer
- Denis Tardif, Canadian politician
- Denis Țăroi (born 2008), Romanian footballer
- Denis Ten (1993-2018), Kazakhstani figure skater
- Denis Teofikov (2000–2021), Bulgarian singer
- Denis Terentyev (born 1992), Russian professional footballer
- Denis Thatcher (1915-2003), British businessman, husband of British Prime Minister Margaret Thatcher
- Denis Thériault (born 1959), Canadian author, playwright, and screenwriter of French-Canadian descent
- Denis Thomalla (born 1992), German professional footballer
- Denis Thwaites (1944-2015), English professional footballer murdered in the 2015 Sousse attacks
- Denis Tierney (1914–1970), Irish rugby union player
- Denis Tillinac (1947-2020), French writer and journalist
- Denis Tishagin (born 1975), Russian skier
- Denis Tkachuk (born 1989), Russian professional footballer
- Denis Tolebaev (born 1987), Kazakhstani footballer
- Denis Tolpeko (born 1985), Russian KHL player
- Denis Tomaj (?-1241), Hungarian baron
- Denis Tomic (born 1998), Austrian professional footballer
- Denis Tomlinson (1910-1993), Rhodesian cricketer
- Denis Tonucci (born 1988), Italian footballer
- Denis Toussaint Lesage (1758-1796), French deputy, politician, and lawyer
- Denis Trapashko (born 1990), Belarusian footballer
- Denis Trautmann (born 1972), German race walker
- Denis Trček (born 1963), Slovenian computer scientist and university professor
- Denis Trento (born 1982), Italian ski mountaineer
- Denis Tristant (born 1964), French handball player
- Denis Troch (born 1959), French professional footballer and manager
- Denis Trottier (born 1952), Canadian politician and teacher
- Denis Trudel (born 1963), Canadian actor and politician
- Denis Truscott (1908-1989), British businessman and mayor
- Denis Tsargush (born 1987), Russian freestyle wrestler of Abkhaz descent
- Denis Tsoumou (born 1978), Congolese professional footballer
- Denis Tsygurov (1971-2015), Russian NHL player
- Denis Tumasyan (born 1985), Russian football coach and player of Armenian descent
- Denis Tunnicliffe, Baron Tunnicliffe (born 1943), British pilot and railwayman
- Denis Tuohy (born 1937), Irish television broadcaster, newsreader, journalist, and actor
- Denis Türje (1200s-1255), Hungarian baron, landowner, and military leader
- Denis Twitchett (1925-2006), British sinologist and scholar
- Denis Tyndall (1890-1965), British Army personnel and Anglican priest
- Denis Tyurin (born 1980), Russian KHL player

== U ==
- Denis van Uffelen (born 1971), Belgian professional tennis player
- Denis Ugarov (born 1975), Russian professional football coach and player
- Denis Ulanov (born 1993), Kazakh Olympic weightlifter
- Denis Ursu (born 2004), Romanian professional footballer
- Denis Urubko (born 1973), Russian-Polish mountaineer
- Denis Uryvkov (born 1985), Russian professional footballer

== V ==
- Denis Vairasse (c. 1630-1672), French Huguenot writer
- Denis Valdez Perez (born 1979), Russian footballer
- Denis Vambolt (born 1995), Russian footballer
- Denis Van Weynbergh (born 1967), Danish offshore yachtsman
- Denis Vann (1916-1961), English cricketer
- Denis Vaucher (1898-1993), Swiss cross country skier
- Denis Vaugeois (born 1935), Canadian author, publisher, and historian
- Denis Vaughan (1926-2017), Australian-born orchestral conductor and multi-instrumentalist
- Denis Vavilin (born 1982), Russian footballer
- Denis Vavro (born 1996), Slovak professional footballer
- Denis Velić (born 1982), Swedish football manager and player
- Denis Ventúra (born 1995), Slovak professional footballer
- Denis Verdini (born 1951), Italian politician, banker, and convicted felon
- Denis Verschueren (1897-1954), Belgian racing cyclist
- Denis Vetchinov (1976-2008), Russian military personnel
- Denis Viane (born 1977), Belgian footballer
- Denis Vidal (born 1954), French anthropologist
- Denis Vieru (born 1996), Moldovan judoka
- Denis Viger (1741-1805), Canadian carpenter, businessman, and political figure
- Denis-Benjamin Viger (1774-1861), Canadian politician, lawyer, and businessman
- Denis Vikhrov (born 1992), Russian footballer
- Denis Villeneuve (born 1967), Canadian film director, film producer, and screenwriter
- Denis Višinský (born 2003), Czech professional footballer
- Denis Volodin (born 1982), Kazakhstani professional footballer
- Denis Volotka (born 1985), Kazakhstani cross-country skier
- Denis Vorobyov (born 1979), Belarusian cross-country skier
- Denis Voronenkov (1971-2017), Russian politician
- Denis Voronov (born 1991), Russian footballer
- Denis Voynov (born 1990), Russian footballer
- Denis Vrain-Lucas (1818-1882), French forger

== W ==
- Denis Waitley (1933–2025), American motivational speaker, writer, and consultant
- Denis Wakeling (1918-2004), Church of England bishop
- Denis Walker (1933–2024), Rhodesian politician and Methodist missionary
- Denis Walker (activist) (1947-2017), Aboriginal Australian activist
- Denis Walsh (disambiguation) (various)
- Denis Walter (born 1955), Australian radio presenter, baritone singer, recording artist, and media personality
- Denis Warner (1917-2012), Australian journalist, war correspondent, and historian
- Denis Watson (born 1955), Zimbabwean professional golfer
- Denis Watson (politician), Northern Irish politician
- Denis Waxin (born 1968), French serial killer- and rapist
- Denis Weaire (born 1942), Irish physicist and emeritus professor
- Denis Weidlich (born 1986), Ghanaian-German professional footballer
- Denis Welch (1945-2014), British racing driver and businessman
- Denis Whitaker (1915-2001), Canadian athlete, soldier, businessman, and author
- Denis Whitburn (born 1944), Australian film writer and producer
- Denis Wick (1931–2025), British influential orchestral trombonist
- Denis Wieczorek (born 1991), German figure skater
- Denis Wiehe (born 1940), African Roman Catholic bishop
- Denis Wigan (1893-1958), English cricketer and British Army officer
- Denis Williams (1923-1998), Guyanese painter, author, and archaeologist
- Denis John Williams (1908-1990), Welsh neurologist and epileptologist
- Denis Wilson (footballer) (1936–2026), English footballer
- Denis Wirtz (born 1965), Belgian-American scientist and educator
- Denis Wojcik, American author
- Denis Wolf (born 1983), German professional footballer
- Denis Wood (born 1945), American artist, author, cartographer, professor, and convicted child molester
- Denis Worrall (1935–2023), South African academic, businessman, politician, and diplomat
- Denis Wosik (born 1996), German-Polish kickboxer
- Denis Wright (1911-2005), British diplomat
- Denis Wright (composer) (1895-1967), English composer and music conductor
- Denis Wucherer (born 1973), German basketball coach and player
- Denis Wynne (1945–1999), Irish Gaelic footballer

== Y ==
- Denis Yachmenev (born 1984), Russian VHL player
- Denis Yakhno (born 1992), Belarusian professional footballer
- Denis Yakuba (born 1996), Russian footballer
- Denis Yakubovich (born 1988), Belarusian professional footballer
- Denis Yanakov (born 1999), Ukrainian professional footballer
- Denis Yarats, computer scientist
- Denis Yaskovich (born 1995), Belarusian professional footballer
- Denis Yevseev (born 1973), Russian chess grandmaster
- Denis Yevseyev (born 1993), Kazakh tennis player
- Denis Yevsikov (born 1981), Russian football coach and player
- Denis Yip, Hong Kong business executive
- Denis Yuskov (born 1989), Russian speed skater

== Z ==
- Denis Zabolotin (born 1998), Russian handball player
- Denis Zabrodin (born 1984), Russian professional footballer
- Denis Zachaire (1510-1556), French alchemist
- Denis Zakaria (born 1996), Swiss professional footballer
- Denis Zanette (1970-2003), Italian professional racing cyclist
- Denis Zanko (born 1964), French professional football manager and player
- Denis Zanoni (1941-1991), Australian rules footballer
- Denis Žerić (born 1998), Bosnian professional footballer
- Denis Zeunert (1931-2009), Australian rules footballer
- Denis Zhivchikov (born 1976), Kazakhstani water polo player
- Denis Zhukovskiy (born 1980), Russian professional footballer
- Denis Zimba (born 1971), Zambian boxer
- Denis Zivkovic (born 1987), American professional tennis player
- Denis Zmeu (born 1985), Moldovan footballer
- Denis Zubko (born 1974), Russian association football coach and player
- Denis Zubov (born 1981), Russian serial killer
- Denis Zubrytsky (1777-1862), Ukrainian historian
- Denis Žvegelj (born 1972), Slovenian rower
- Denis Zvizdić, Chairman of the Council of Ministers of Bosnia and Herzegovina from 2015 to 2019
- Denis Zvonić (born 1992), Bosnian footballer

== See also ==
- Deioneus: Deon, Deion, Deone, Dion, Dione, Dionne
- Dionysius: Dionis, Dionisi, Dionisia, Dionisie, Dionisi, Dionisije, Dionisio, Dionisius/Dionisiy, Dionys, Dionysio, Dionysios, Dionysious
  - Denice (disambiguation, given name), Denis (given name, surname), Denisa, Denise (disambiguation, given name), Deniska, Denni, Dennis, Dennise, Deniss, Denisse, Denny (given name, surname), Dennys, Denys, Denyse
