= Prieur =

Prieur is:

- The French word for and derived from the Latin substantive Prior
- A surname. Notable people with this surname include:
  - Barthélemy Prieur, a French sculptor
  - Denis Prieur (more than one notable person has/had this name)
  - Domaine Jacques Prieur
  - Jean-Louis Prieur
  - Philippe Prieur
  - Pierre Prieur
  - Pierre Louis Prieur
  - Sophie Prieur
  - Yves le Prieur

== See also ==
- Yves Le Prieur
