= Denis Ivanov =

Denis Ivanov may refer to:

- Denis Ivanov (footballer) (born 1983), Russian former professional footballer
- Denis Ivanov (filmmaker) (born 1978), Ukrainian producer, film distributor, cultural manager, and TV presenter
