= Denis Cotter (cricketer) =

Australian cricketer

Personal information
- Born: 1862; Melbourne, Australia
- Died: 18 November 1905 (aged 42–43); Melbourne, Australia

Domestic team information
- Years: Team
- 1887-1889: Victoria
- Source: Cricinfo, 25 July 2015

Denis Cotter (1862 – 18 November 1905) was an Australian cricketer. He played three first-class cricket matches for Victoria between 1887 and 1889. He also played in baseball games with the Melbourne Baseball Club, acting as a catcher for William Bruce.

== See also ==
- List of Victoria first-class cricketers
