= Denis-Louis Destors =

French architect

Denis-Louis Destors (October 27, 1816 – 26 May 1882) was a French architect.
