= Denis McFadden =

Denis McFadden (born Sydney 1946) is an Australian hairdresser-turned-businessman and entrepreneur. He is the founder and franchisor of Just Cuts, the largest hairdressing franchise company in the Southern Hemisphere.

McFadden's international profile was elevated when Just Cuts secured the role of Official Hairdresser of the Sydney 2000 Olympic Games and Paralympic Games.

During the COVID-19 pandemic, McFadden was a high-profile vocal national advocate for the health and safety of stylists.

McFadden is a member of the Franchise Council of Australia's Hall of Fame, which honours outstanding performers in the franchising industry.

== Career ==
McFadden completed his hairdressing apprenticeship in Sydney under master hairdressers Albert Del Grande and Robert Bunting before moving to London where he opened his first salon in the Marble Arch area at the top of Oxford Street in 1971.

In 1979, McFadden returned to Australia, opening a hairdressing salon in Sydney. In 1983, he identified a gap in the market for quality, well-priced haircuts without the need to make an appointment and Just Cuts was born.

The first Just Cuts franchise salon was opened in 1990 and as of October 2017, there are 200 Just Cuts salons across Australia and New Zealand. In 2017, the company's annual revenue was reported to be $106m, placing it at number 436 of The Australian Financial Review’s Top 500 Australian Private Companies.

In March 2004, McFadden launched Just Cuts operations in Canada.

In July 2026, McFadden released his memoir, justcuts: The Power of Showing Up.

== Philanthropy ==
To date, McFadden's Outback Trek Just Cuts "Cut-a-Rama" has raised more than $850,000 (AUD) for the Australian-based Royal Flying Doctor Service. In 2024, McFadden donated a cardiac defibrillator to Vanimo Hospital, West Sepik, Papua New Guinea.

== Television and book contributions ==
In 2010, McFadden was one of the millionaires who featured on The Secret Millionaire Australia, a reality television show which aired on the Nine Network. The same year, McFadden featured in the book by Nick Gardner, How I made My First Million, 26 Self-made Millionaires Reveal the Secrets to Their Success, a collection of stories of men and women who turned a simple idea into a successful business.

== Recognition ==
McFadden served on the board of the Franchise Council of Australia in the 1990s and was the president of the New South Wales chapter for two years. In 2013, he was inducted into the Franchise Council of Australia's Hall of Fame which honours the franchising sector's most outstanding performers.
