= Denis Tierney =

Irish rugby union player

- Full name: Denis Finbarr Tierney
- Born: 6 November 1914 Cork, Ireland
- Died: 6 June 1970 (aged 55) Peterborough, England

Rugby union career
- Position: Lock
International career
Years	Team	Apps	(Points)
1938–39	Ireland	3	(0)

Denis Finbarr Tierney (6 November 1914 – 6 June 1970) was an Irish international rugby union player.

Tierney was a native of Cork and attended University College Cork, where in addition to rugby he competed in varsity boxing. He played his rugby as a forward and was capped three times for Ireland in the late 1930s.

A doctor, Tierney joined the Jewish Hospital in Manchester as a resident surgical officer during World War II. He practised medicine in Peterborough, Cambridgeshire.

== See also ==
- List of Ireland national rugby union players
