= Denis Buckley (disambiguation) =

Denis Buckley may refer to:

- Denis Buckley (born 1990) – Irish rugby union player
- Denis Buckley (Medal of Honor) (c. 1844–1864) – Canadian soldier

== See also ==
- Dennis Burkley (1945–2013), American actor
- USS Dennis J. Buckley (DD-808)
- USS Dennis J. Buckley (DE-553)
