= Denis Henriquez =

Denis Henriquez (Oranjestad, October 10, 1945) is an Aruban writer.

He studied physics in Delft and worked as a teacher at the Erasmiaans Gymnasium from Rotterdam.

== Works ==
- 1981 E soño di Alicia. Based on "Alice in Wonderland" by Lewis Carroll
- 1988 Kas pabow (poems)
- 1992 Zuidstraat
- 1995 Delft blues
- 1999 De zomer van Alejandro Bulos

== Prizes ==
Prijsvraag van het Antilliaans Verhaal, 1990

== References and external links ==
- DBNL Denis Henriquez
