= Denis Firago =

Belarusian professional footballer

Personal information
- Date of birth: 20 November 2000 (age 25)
- Place of birth: Barawlyany, Belarus
- Height: 1.79 m (5 ft 10 in)
- Position: Forward

Youth career
- 2009–2012: Fortuna Minsk
- 2013: BATE Borisov
- 2013–2015: DYuSSh Minsk Raion
- 2016–2018: Isloch Minsk Raion

Senior career*
Years	Team	Apps	(Gls)
2018–2021	Isloch Minsk Raion	2	(0)
2021	→ Molodechno (loan)	7	(6)
- * Club domestic league appearances and goals as of 23:58, 13 December 2021 (UTC)

Denis Firago (Belarusian: Дзяніс Фірага; Russian: Денис Фираго; born 20 November 2000) is a Belarusian professional footballer.
