= Denis Savitsky =

Russian boxer

Personal information
- Nationality: Russian
- Born: Денис Витальевич Савицкий; 2 January 1998 (age 28) Markovo, Chukotka Autonomous Okrug, Russia
- Height: 5 ft (152 cm) 11
- Weight: Heavyweight

Boxing career
- Stance: Orthodox

Boxing record
- Total fights: 13
- Wins: 12
- Win by KO: 8
- Draws: 1

Denis Savitsky (born 2 January 1998) is a Russian professional boxer who currently competes in the heavyweight division.

== Professional career ==
Savisty made his pro debut in Irkutsk in September 2018. He fought Maxim Arkhipov who was also making his debut. In what was a mini upset Savitsky could only manage a draw. He wouldn't fight again for almost 2 years.

=== Savitsky vs Gadzhimagomedov ===
Savitsy won his next seven fights before facing stand out Russian amater Muslim Gadzhimagomedov in an IBA pro fight. Despite being far more experienced as a pro Savitsky could not deal with the skill of Gadzhimagomedov. He suffered a cut over his eye in the fourth round and lost wide on points on the judges scorecards

=== Savitsky vs Ziyatdinov ===
Savitsky claimed the best win when he stopped experienced Artur Ziyatdinov of Uzbekistan in the fifth round. This was the first stoppage loss of Ziyatdinovs career.

Savitsky is currently scheduled to return on July 5 in Ekaterinaburg on a card stacked with the best Russian fighters. He will face fellow Russian Saveliy Sadoma.

== Professional boxing record ==
12 fights	12 wins	0 losses
By knockout	8	0
By decision	4	0

No.	Result	Record	Opponent	Type	Round, time	Date	Location	Notes
13	Win	12–0-1	(Ghana) Nii Ashitey Larbie	TKO	2 (8), 2:28	15 Mar 2025	RCC Boxing Academy, Ekaterinburg, Russia	
12	Win	11-0-1	(Russia) Artem Kiselev	UD	8	30 Nov 2024	RCC Boxing Academy, Ekaterinburg, Russia	
11	Win	10-0-1	(Uzbekistan) Artur Ziyatdinov	TKO	5 (10), 1:09	22 Jun 2024	RCC Boxing Academy, Ekaterinburg, Russia	
10	Win	9-0-1	(Russia) Sergei Ekimov	UD	8	10 Feb 2024	KRK “Uralets”, Ekaterinburg, Russia	
9	Win	8-0-1	(Uzbekistan) Akbarjon Askarov	TKO	3 (6), 2:03	27 May 2023	RCC Boxing Academy, Ekaterinburg, Russia	
8	Win	7-0-1	(Malawi) Mussa Ajibu	TKO	1 (8), 2:24	17 Dec 2022	USC Soviet Wings, Moscow, Russia	
7	Win	6-0-1	(Russia) Denis Tsaryuk	TKO	4 (6), 0:57	19 Nov 2022	RCC Boxing Academy, Ekaterinburg, Russia	
6	Win	5–0-1	(Russia) Igor Vilchitskiy	UD	8	11 Sep 2022	Traktor Sport Palace, Chelyabinsk, Russia	
5	Win	4–0-1	(Ukraine) Oleksandr Pylypchuk	UD	6	10 Dec 2021	RCC Boxing Academy, Ekaterinburg, Russia	
4	Win	3-0-1	(Ukraine) Ivan Ovsienko	TKO	1 (4), 1:45	16 Sep 2021	Bar Studio "Opera", Barnaul, Russia	
3	Win	2-0-1	(Uzbekistan) Khushnud Mamatkulov	KO	1 (4), 1:18	28 Aug 2021	Floyd Mayweather Boxing Academy, Zhukovka, Russia	
2	Win	1–0-1	(Uzbekistan) Khushnud Mamatkulov	TKO	1 (4), 0:58	26 Jun 2021	USC Soviet Wings, Moscow, Russia	
1	Draw	0-0-1	(Russia) Maxim Arkhipov	PTS	4	21 Sep 2018	Ringriderteltet, Aabenraa, Russia	
