= Denis Cousins =

English cricketer

Denis Cousins (born 29 March 1939) is an English former cricketer. He was a right-handed batsman and right-arm medium-fast bowler who played for Cambridgeshire. He was born in Cambridge.

Cousins made his cricketing debut for Surrey Second XI during the 1967 season. Cousins made his only List A appearance for Cambridgeshire during the 1972 season, against Buckinghamshire. From the tailend, he scored 5 runs.

Cousins bowled 12 overs during the match, taking figures of 1-37.

Cousins' son, Darren, played first-class cricket, while his uncle, Harold, played Minor Counties Cricket for Cambridgeshire.
