= Denis M. Hughes =

American chairman

Denis Hughes
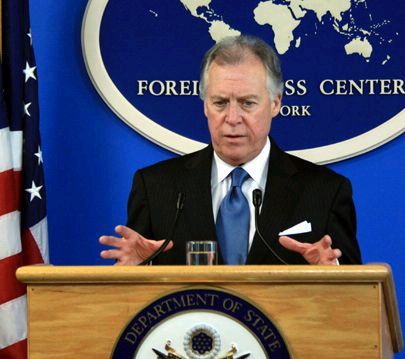
- Hughes in 2011

President of the New York AFL-CIO
- In office March 23, 1999 – December 16, 2011
- Preceded by: Edward J. Cleary
- Succeeded by: Mario Cilento

Personal details
- Born: Staten Island, New York, U.S.
- Education: Empire State College (BS)

Denis M. Hughes is chairman (formerly acting chairman and deputy chair) and Class C director of the New York Federal Reserve Board, as well as former president of the 2.5-million-member New York State AFL-CIO.

In 2003, Hughes was elected to the board of directors of the Federal Reserve Bank of New York, and currently serves as chair of the Management and Budget Committee, and is a member of the Audit Committee of the Federal Reserve Bank of New York.

He joined the New York State AFL-CIO staff in 1985 as a political director, and in February 1990 was appointed to the position of executive assistant to the president. In this capacity, Hughes acted as a union lobbyist within the federation. Hughes was elected president of the New York State AFL-CIO 1999.
