= Denis Jäpel =

German footballer

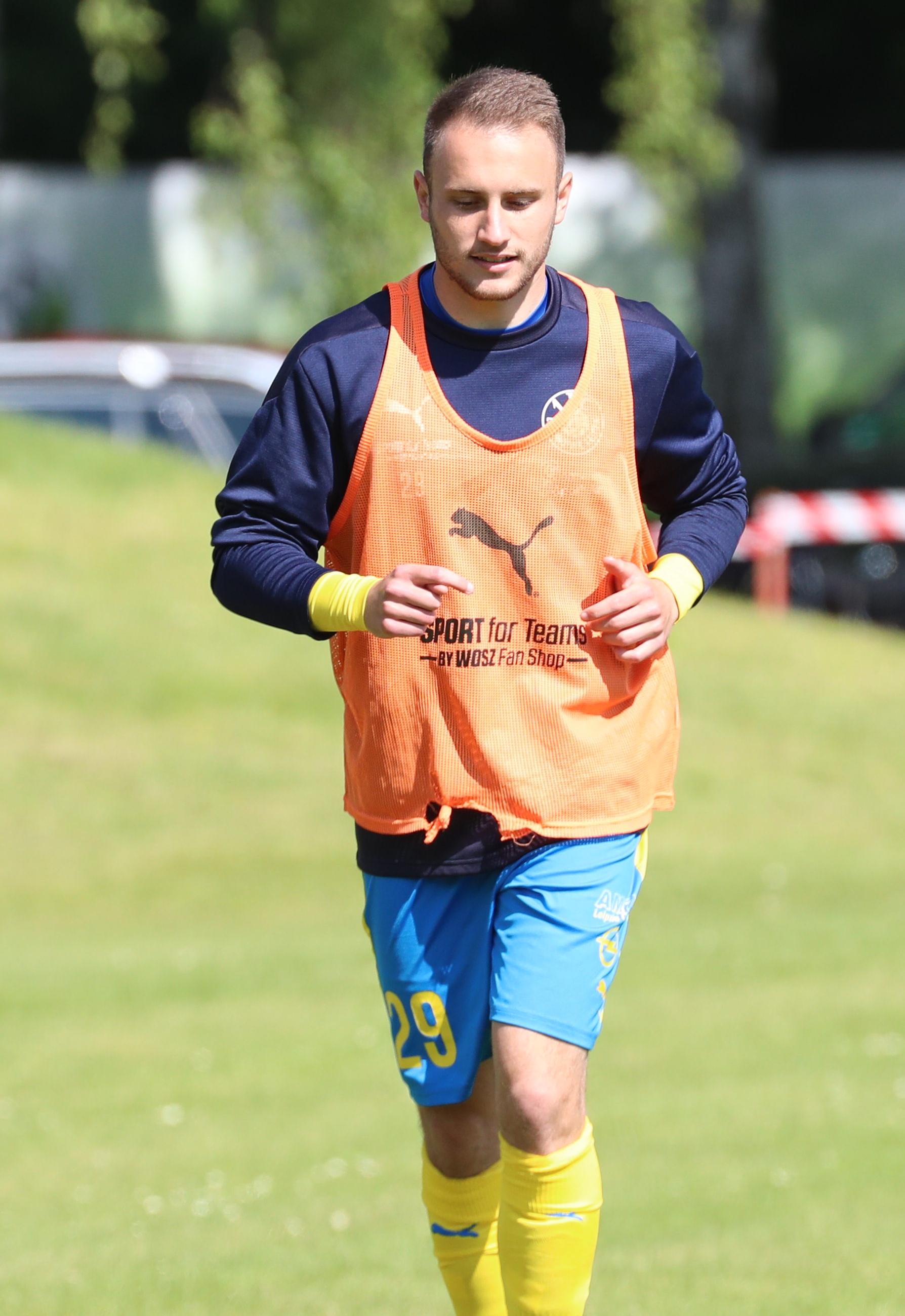

Personal information
- Date of birth: 26 May 1998 (age 28)
- Place of birth: Weimar, Germany
- Height: 1.78 m (5 ft 10 in)
- Position: Forward

Team information
- Current team: Chemie Leipzig
- Number: 33

Senior career*
Years	Team	Apps	(Gls)
2015–2017	SC 1903 Weimar	30	(24)
2017–2018	FC Carl Zeiss Jena II	28	(20)
2018–2019	FC Carl Zeiss Jena	0	(0)
2018–2019	→ VfB Germania Halberstadt (loan)	29	(8)
2019–2020	FSV Zwickau	6	(0)
2020–2021	1. FC Lokomotive Leipzig	9	(1)
2021–	Chemie Leipzig	97	(20)
- * Club domestic league appearances and goals as of 24 April 2024

Denis Jäpel (born 26 May 1998) is a German footballer who plays for Regionalliga Nordost side Chemie Leipzig.

== Professional career ==
Jäpel collided head-first into a concrete wall at the Stadion an der Gellertstraße in a match against Chemnitzer FC on 1 October 2024, while attempting to prevent a ball from crossing the endline for a goal kick. The collision knocked Jäpel unconscious, and he was hospitalized for a day.
