= Denis Hughson =

Australian rules footballer

Personal information
- Full name: Denis Hughson
- Born: 3rd of March 1943; Melbourne
- Original team: South Warrnambool
- Height: 173 cm (5 ft 8 in)
- Weight: 74 kg (163 lb)

Playing career^{1}
Years	Club	Games (Goals)
1965	Fitzroy	1 (1)
- ^{1} Playing statistics correct to the end of 1965.

Denis Hughson (born 30 August 1944) is a former Australian rules footballer who played with Fitzroy in the Victorian Football League (VFL).
