= Denis Soynikov =

Russian footballer

Personal information
- Full name: Denis Igorevich Soynikov
- Date of birth: 3 June 1986 (age 40)
- Place of birth: Kursk, Russian SFSR
- Height: 1.76 m (5 ft 9 1/2 in)
- Position: Midfielder

Team information
- Current team: FC Avangard Kursk (assistant coach)

Youth career
- Kurskrezinotekhnika Kursk

Senior career*
| Years | Team | Apps | (Gls) |
| 2003–2004 | FC Avangard Kursk | 3 | (0) |
| 2005–2006 | FC Avangard-2 Kursk | | |
| 2006–2009 | FC Avangard Kursk | 16 | (0) |
| 2008 | → FC Yelets (loan) | 11 | (1) |
| 2009 | FC Dnepr Smolensk | 10 | (1) |
| 2010 | FC Spartak Tambov | 28 | (1) |
| 2011 | FC Avangard Kursk | 9 | (0) |
| 2011–2013 | FC Gubkin | 49 | (2) |
| 2013 | FC Avangard Kursk | 1 | (0) |
| 2013–2014 | FC Oryol | 21 | (0) |
| 2015–2017 | FC Avangard Kursk | 47 | (4) |

Managerial career
- 2024–: FC Avangard Kursk (assistant)
- * Club domestic league appearances and goals

Denis Igorevich Soynikov (Russian: Денис Игоревич Сойников; born 3 June 1986) is a Russian professional football coach and a former player. He is an assistant coach with FC Avangard Kursk.

== Club career ==
He played in the Russian Football National League for FC Avangard Kursk in 2007.
