= Denis Carey =

Denis Carey may refer to:

- Denis Carey (actor) (1909–1986), British actor
- Denis Carey (athlete) (1872–1947), Irish track and field athlete
- Denis Carey (composer), Irish musician and composer
- D. J. Carey (born 1970), Irish hurler
