= Denis Oswald =

Denis Oswald may refer to:

- Denis Oswald (sports official) (born 1947), a Swiss rower and sports official
- Denis Oswald (codebreaker) (1910–1998), an English cricketer, educator and a codebreaker at Bletchley Park

== See also ==
- Denis Oswald Jordan (1914–1982), Anglo-Australian chemist
