= Denis Hardy =

Denis Hardy may refer to:

- Denis Hardy (economist), Canadian economist
- Denis Hardy (politician) (1936–2016), Canadian politician

== See also ==
- Dennis Hardy (born 1941), English former vice-chancellor of the University of Seychelles (UniSey)
