= Dennis Moran =

Dennis or Denis Moran may refer to:

- Dennis Moran (rugby league) (born 1977), British rugby league footballer
- Dennis Moran (computer criminal) (1982–2013), American computer criminal
- Denis Moran (Gaelic footballer) (born 1956), Irish Gaelic footballer

== See also ==
- Dennis Morin (1946–2012), American entrepreneur and programmer
