= Denis Mijatović =

Croatian futsal player

Mijatović
Personal information
- Full name: Denis Mijatović
- Date of birth: 1 June 1983 (age 43)
- Position: Pivot

Team information
- Current team: Vrgorac GTP

International career
Years	Team	Apps	(Gls)
- Croatia

Denis Mijatović (born 1 June 1983), is a Croatian futsal player who plays for MNK Vrgorac GTP and the Croatia national futsal team.
