= Denis Gomez =

Colombian footballer (born 1991)

Personal information
- Full name: Denis Leonardo Gomez Lozano
- Date of birth: 7 October 1991 (age 35)
- Place of birth: Colombia
- Positions: Right-back; right midfielder

Youth career
- 2007–2010: América de Cali

Senior career*
| Years | Team | Apps | (Gls) |
| 2011 | Atlético Bucaramanga | | |
| 2011 | América de Cali | | |
| 2013 | Uniautónoma | | |
| 2013–2015 | Jaguares de Córdoba | | |
| 2015–2016 | Atlético Huila | | |
| 2016 | Jaguares de Córdoba | | |
| 2017–2019 | Águilas Doradas Rionegro | | |
- * Club domestic league appearances and goals

Denis Leonardo Gomez Lozano (born 7 October 1991), commonly known as Denis Gomez, is a Colombian professional footballer who plays as a right-back or right midfielder.

== Clubs ==
- Atlético Bucaramanga: 2011
- América de Cali: 2011
- Uniautónoma: 2013
- Jaguares de Córdoba: 2013–2015
- Atletico Huila: 2015–2016
- Jaguares de Córdoba: 2016
- Águilas Doradas Rionegro: 2017–2019

== Club career ==
From 2007, Gomez played for América de Cali. First, he started in the U17 team and as of 2010 he played for the U19 team and participated in the national U19 Championship, Campeonato Postobón Sub19. In 2009, he played several matches in the Copa Postobón tournament for the first team of América de Cali.
