= Denis Collins =

Denis Collins or Dennis Collins may refer to:

- Denis Collins (business ethicist) (born 1956), American teacher of business ethics
- Denis Collins (footballer) (1953–2011), Australian rules footballer of the 1970s
- Denis Collins (journalist), American journalist and juror in the trial of Scooter Libby
- Denis Collins (politician) (born 1941), Australian politician from the Northern Territory
- Dennis J. Collins (1900–1974), American politician and lawyer
- Dennis P. Collins (1924–2009), American politician; former mayor of Bayonne, New Jersey
