= Denis Ivanov (footballer) =

Russian footballer

Personal information
- Full name: Denis Sergeyevich Ivanov
- Date of birth: 3 October 1983 (age 43)
- Place of birth: Frunze, Kyrgyz SSR
- Height: 1.78 m (5 ft 10 in)
- Position: Midfielder

Youth career
- FC Metallurg Lipetsk

Senior career*
| Years | Team | Apps | (Gls) |
| 2001–2003 | FC Titan Moscow | 95 | (6) |
| 2004–2007 | FC Metallurg Lipetsk | 120 | (14) |
| 2008 | FC Dynamo Voronezh | 26 | (2) |
| 2009 | FC Rotor Volgograd | 9 | (0) |
| 2010 | FC Yelets (amateur) | | |
- * Club domestic league appearances and goals

Denis Sergeyevich Ivanov (Russian: Денис Серге́евич Иванов; born 3 October 1983) is a former Russian professional football player.

== Club career ==
He played two seasons in the Russian Football National League for FC Metallurg Lipetsk.
