= Denis Matyugin =

Russian footballer

Personal information
- Full name: Denis Aleksandrovich Matyugin
- Date of birth: 28 May 1992 (age 34)
- Height: 1.83 m (6 ft 0 in)
- Position: Forward

Youth career
- FC Ural Sverdlovsk Oblast

Senior career*
Years	Team	Apps	(Gls)
2011–2013	FC Ural Sverdlovsk Oblast	2	(0)
2011	→ FC Gornyak Uchaly (loan)	6	(0)
- * Club domestic league appearances and goals

Denis Aleksandrovich Matyugin (Russian: Денис Александрович Матюгин; born 28 May 1992) is a former Russian football forward.

== Club career ==
He made his debut in the Russian Second Division for FC Gornyak Uchaly on 24 April 2011 in a game against FC Khimik Dzerzhinsk.

He made his Russian Football National League debut for FC Ural Sverdlovsk Oblast on 29 April 2012 in a game against FC Torpedo Moscow.
