= Denis Kapustin =

Denis Kapustin may refer to:

- Denis Kapustin (athlete) (born 1970), Russian and Soviet Olympic triple jumper
- Denis Kapustin (militant) (born 1984), founder and leader of the Russian Volunteer Corps
