= Denis Churkin =

Denis Churkin may refer to:

- Denis Churkin (footballer, born 1979), Russian football player
- Denis Churkin (footballer, born 2001), Russian football player
