= Denis Silva =

Denis Silva may refer to:

- Denis Silva (footballer, born 1985), Brazilian football centre-back
- Denis Silva (footballer, born 1986), Brazilian football defender
