= Denis Davydov (disambiguation) =

Denis Davydov (1784–1839) was a Russian soldier-poet of the Napoleonic Wars.

Denis Davydov may also refer to:

- Denis Davydov (footballer) (born 1995), Russian footballer
- Denis Davydov, a Dyugon-class landing craft, launched 2013
- Denis Davydov, a Rodina-class motorship, built c. 1954–1961
