= Denis Robin =

Denis Robin may refer to:

- Denis Robin (civil servant) (born 1962), French civil servant
- Denis Robin (cyclist) (born 1979), French road racing cyclist
