= Denis Vann =

English cricketer

Personal information
- Full name: Denis William Arthur Vann
- Born: 21 November 1916; Northampton, Northamptonshire, England
- Died: 20 January 1961 (aged 44); Kettering, Northamptonshire, England
- Batting: Right-handed
- Bowling: Unknown

Domestic team information
- Years: Team
- 1936–1937: Northamptonshire

Career statistics
Competition	First-class
Matches	4
Runs scored	47
Batting average	7.83
100s/50s	–/–
Top score	16
Balls bowled	180
Wickets	2
Bowling average	52.00
5 wickets in innings	–
10 wickets in match	–
Best bowling	2/26
Catches/stumpings	1/–
- Source: Cricinfo, 16 November 2011

Denis William Arthur Vann (21 November 1916 – 20 January 1961) was an English cricketer. Vann was a right-handed batsman whose bowling style is unknown. He was born at Northampton, Northamptonshire.

Vann made his first-class debut for Northamptonshire against Warwickshire in the 1936 County Championship. He made three further first-class appearances for the county the following season against Nottinghamshire, Cambridge University and Worcestershire. In his four first-class matches, he scored 47 runs at an average of 7.83, with a high score of 16. With the ball, he took 2 wickets at a bowling average of 52.00, with best figures of 2/26.

He died at Kettering, Northamptonshire on 20 January 1961.
