= Denis Coulthard Graham =

British biological chemist

Denis Coulthard Graham FRSE FRSC FIB FRSA (December 1929 – 12 October 2002) was a British biological chemist. He specialised in plant diseases and their treatment.

== Biography ==
Denis Coulthard Graham was born in Carlisle in December 1929.

He went to Durham University, graduating with a BSc. He then undertook postgraduate studies at the University of Edinburgh gaining a doctorate (PhD).

He became Director of Agricultural Scientific Services in the Department of Agriculture and Fisheries within the Scottish Office. The University of Edinburgh granted him a second, honorary doctorate (DSc) while in this role.

He died in Edinburgh on 12 October 2002.

== Recognition ==
In 1975 he was elected a Fellow of the Royal Society of Edinburgh. His proposers included Mary Noble.

== Personal life ==
In 1968 he married Elizabeth (Betty) Fraser, a New Zealander. They had no children. From the 1970s he lived in Caiystane Gardens in southern Edinburgh.

== Publications ==
- Chemical Control of Certain Fungal Diseases of Potato Tubers (1982)
