= Denis Vikhrov =

Russian footballer

Personal information
- Full name: Denis Yuryevich Vikhrov
- Date of birth: 15 March 1992 (age 34)
- Place of birth: Saint Petersburg, Russia
- Height: 1.87 m (6 ft 2 in)
- Position: Defender

Youth career
- FC Zenit Saint Petersburg

Senior career*
Years	Team	Apps	(Gls)
2011–2012	FC Krylia Sovetov Samara	0	(0)
2014–2016	FC Dynamo Saint Petersburg	38	(1)
2017–2018	FC Rubin Yalta	17	(0)
- * Club domestic league appearances and goals

Denis Yuryevich Vikhrov (Russian: Денис Юрьевич Вихров; born 15 March 1992) is a Russian former football player.

== Club career ==
He made his professional debut in the Russian Football National League for FC Dynamo Saint Petersburg on 30 March 2014 in a game against FC Angusht Nazran.
