= Denis Rusu =

Denis Rusu may refer to:

- Denis Rusu (footballer, born 1990), Moldovan footballer
- Denis Rusu (footballer, born 2001), Romanian footballer
