= Denis Pack-Beresford =

Denis Pack-Beresford may refer to:

- Denis Pack-Beresford (politician) (1818–1881), Irish Conservative politician
- Denis Robert Pack-Beresford (1864–1942), Irish entomologist and arachnologist, son of the above

== See also ==
- Denis Pack (1775–1823), British military officer
