= Denis Cameron =

Denis Cameron may refer to:

- Denis Cameron (photographer) (1928–2006), American photojournalist
- Denis Cameron (rugby union) (1938–2025), New Zealand rugby union player
