= Denis Kurepanov =

Russian ice hockey player

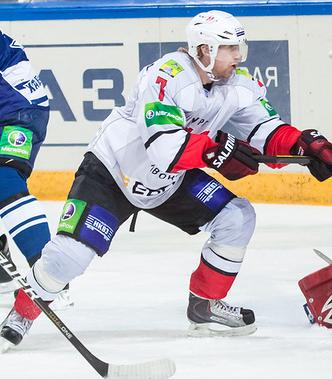
- Denis Kurepanov
- Born: March 30, 1988 (age 37) Barnaul, Russian SFSR, Soviet Union
- Height: 5 ft 8 in (173 cm)
- Weight: 181 lb (82 kg; 12 st 13 lb)
- Position: Forward
- Shoots: Left
- LM team Former teams: Diables Rouges de Briançon; Metallurg Novokuznetsk; Yuzhny Ural Orsk
- NHL draft: Undrafted
- Playing career: 2004–present

Denis Kurepanov (born March 30, 1988) is a Russian professional ice hockey forward currently playing for Diables Rouges de Briançon of the Ligue Magnus.

Kurepanov made his Kontinental Hockey League debut playing with Metallurg Novokuznetsk during the 2011–12 KHL season. Kurepanov played 149 games in the KHL over four seasons with Novokuznetsk before he was released from his contract on June 23, 2015.
