= Denis Conway =

Denis Conway may refer to:

- Denis Conway (bishop) (1722–1796), Irish Roman Catholic prelate, bishop of Limerick (1779–1796)
- Denis Conway (actor) (born 1960), Irish actor
- Dennis D. Conway (1868–1926), American politician
- Michael Denis Conway (born 1956), English footballer
