= Denis Gleeson =

Australian rules footballer (1896–1970)

Personal information
- Full name: Denis John Gleeson
- Born: 19 January 1896; South Melbourne, Victoria
- Died: 16 November 1970 (aged 74); Fitzroy, Victoria
- Original team: Lennox Juniors

Playing career^{1}
Years	Club	Games (Goals)
1917–18	Richmond	22 (0)
- ^{1} Playing statistics correct to the end of 1918.

Denis John Gleeson (19 January 1896 – 16 November 1970) was an Australian rules footballer who played with Richmond in the Victorian Football League (VFL).
