= Denis Railton =

Australian rules footballer

Personal information
- Full name: Denis Railton
- Born: 28 December 1940
- Died: 19 November 2023 (aged 82)
- Original team: Echuca
- Height: 188 cm (6 ft 2 in)
- Weight: 84 kg (185 lb)

Playing career^{1}
Years	Club	Games (Goals)
1960–63	North Melbourne	35 (2)
- ^{1} Playing statistics correct to the end of 1963.

Denis Railton (28 December 1940 – 19 November 2023) was an Australian rules footballer who played with North Melbourne in the Victorian Football League (VFL).
