= Denis Sayers =

English cricketer

Denis Sayers (born 17 March 1934) was an English cricketer. He was a right-handed batsman and a right-arm medium-pace bowler. He was born in St. Pancras, London.

Having represented the Second XI as far back as 1963, Sayers made a single first-class appearance for Essex, during the 1967 season. Sayers finished not out in the first innings, and did not bat in the second, bowling during both Nottinghamshire innings.

Sayers was a tailend batsman for the Second XI, who held this position during his one first-class match.
