= Denis Wojcik =

American novelist

- Writing career
- Genres: Historical fiction, Thriller
- Website: deniswojcik.com

Denis Wojcik is an American author from Flower Mound, Texas. Denis has written four novels including CrossRoads (2005), TurnBack (2006), Linked (2009), and Evil Behind the Smile (2010).

== Works ==
- CrossRoads, 2005
- TurnBack, 2006
- Linked, 2009
- Evil Behind the Smile, 2010
