= Denis Lindsay =

Denis Lindsay may refer to:

- Denis Christopher Lindsay, British botanist and lichenologist
- Denis Lindsay (cricketer) (1939–2005), South African cricketer

== See also ==
- Dennis Lindsey (born 1969), American professional basketball executive
