= Denis Yip =

Hong Kong business executive

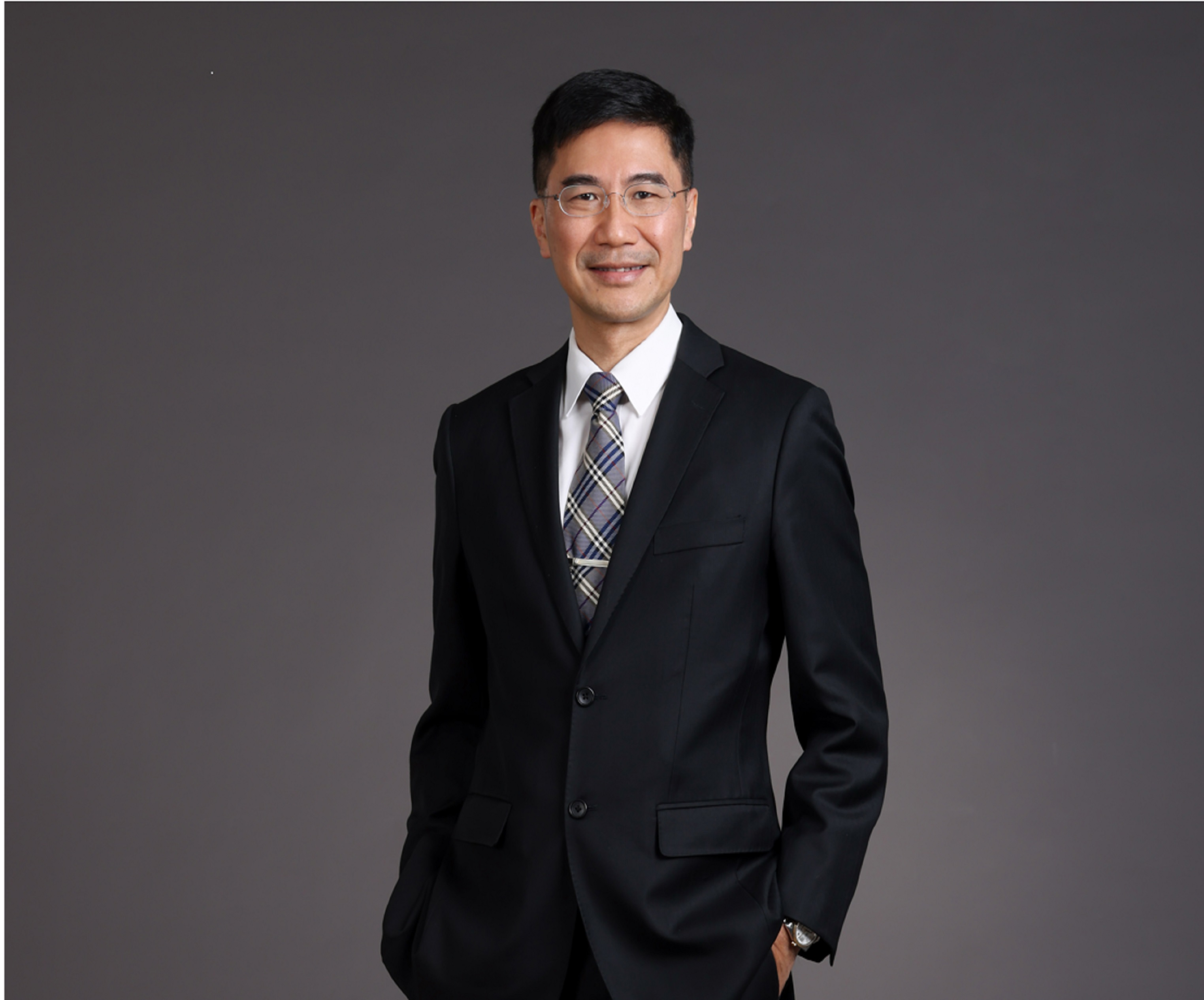

HKSAR Hong Kong Applied Science and Technology Research Institute Chief Executive Officer (CEO)
- Incumbent
- Assumed office October 2021

HKSAR Commerce and Economic Development Bureau 「Belt and Road」Commissioner
- In office June 2019 – October 2021

Personal details
- Education: University of California; Golden Gate University; University of Management and Technology; Diocesan Boys School

Denis Yip (Chinese: 葉成輝) is the chief executive officer (CEO) of the Hong Kong Applied Science and Technology Research Institute (ASTRI).

== Early life and education ==
Yip earned a BS in electrical engineering and computer science from the University of California at Berkeley and an MS in the same field in 1991. He later went on to earn an MBA from Golden Gate University.

== Career ==
From 1991 to 2006, Yip held a variety of senior management positions in the International Business Machines Corporation (IBM), including vice president of the Asia Pacific Storage Division.

He had been the senior vice president and the president of Greater China of EMC Corporation since July 2006, and the senior vice president and president of Greater China of Dell Technologies Inc. since 2016.

From 2017 to early 2019, Yip served as president and director of the Digital China Holdings Company and the Fujian Start Group respectively.

He served as the commissioner for belt and Road of the Commerce and Economic Development Bureau, Hong Kong SAR government, since June 2019.

In October 2021, Yip was named chief executive officer (CEO) of ASTRI.
