= Denis Bourdoncle =

French footballer (born 1964)

Personal information
- Full name: Denis Bourdoncle
- Date of birth: October 17, 1964 (age 62)
- Place of birth: Libourne, France
- Height: 1.78 m (5 ft 10 in)
- Position: Defender

Senior career*
Years	Team	Apps	(Gls)
1981–1988	Bordeaux	11	(1)
1984–1985	→ Libourne (loan)	9	(1)
1987–1988	→ Chamois Niortais (loan)	36	(2)
1988–1990	Chamois Niortais	57	(2)
1990–1991	Reims	26	(1)
1991–1992	Red Star	27	(0)
1992–1993	La Roche-sur-Yon	24	(0)
1993–1995	Libourne	51	(6)
Total		241	(13)
- * Club domestic league appearances and goals

Denis Bourdoncle (born October 15, 1964) is a French former professional footballer who played as a defender for a number of Ligue 1 and Ligue 2 clubs during his career.
