= Denis Kulakov =

Denis Kulakov may refer to:

- Denis Kulakov (sport shooter) (born 1982), Russian sport shooter
- Denys Kulakov (born 1986), Ukrainian football player
