= Denis Evans (rugby union) =

Welsh rugby player (1936–2022)

- Full name: Denis Pritchard Evans
- Born: 19 March 1936 Scunthorpe, England
- Died: 12 July 2022 (aged 86)

Rugby union career
- Position: Wing
International career
Years	Team	Apps	(Points)
1960	Wales	1	(0)

Denis Pritchard Evans (19 March 1936 – 12 July 2022) was a Welsh international rugby union player.

Born in Scunthorpe, Lancashire, Evans grew up in Trefil from the age of four and was educated at Tredegar Grammar School. He won an Oxford blue while studying at St Edmund Hall, Oxford, appearing in the 1959 Varsity match.

Evans made his debut for Ebbw Vale in 1955 and became club captain in the 1962–63 season. He had a stint in between with Llanelli, from where he gained his sole Wales cap, against the Springboks at Cardiff in 1960.

A businessman, Evans was based in Hong Kong for several years and served as Hong Kong Rugby Union chairman, before succeeding David East as secretary of the Welsh Rugby Union in 1989, a role he was in for four years.

== See also ==
- List of Wales national rugby union players
