= Denis Bernard =

Denis Bernard may refer to:

- Denis Bernard (actor) (born 1957), Canadian film, television and theater actor and producer
- Denis Bernard (British Army officer) (1882–1956)
- Denis Bernard (Gaelic footballer) (1932–2019), Irish Gaelic footballer
