= Denis Bradley (disambiguation) =

Denis Bradley may refer to:

- Denis Bradley, former vice-chairman of the Northern Ireland Policing Board
- Denis J. M. Bradley, American priest and philosopher
- Denis Mary Bradley, Irish-born American prelate of the Roman Catholic Church
