= Denis Fernand Py =

French sculptor, medal artist and engraver (1887–1949)

Fernand Py
- Born: Denis Fernand Py; January 10, 1887; Versailles, France
- Died: September 1, 1949 (aged 62); Sommeville, France
- Burial place: Saint-Amâtre Cemetery in Auxerre, France
- Occupations: sculptor, engraver, artist
- Employer: self-employed

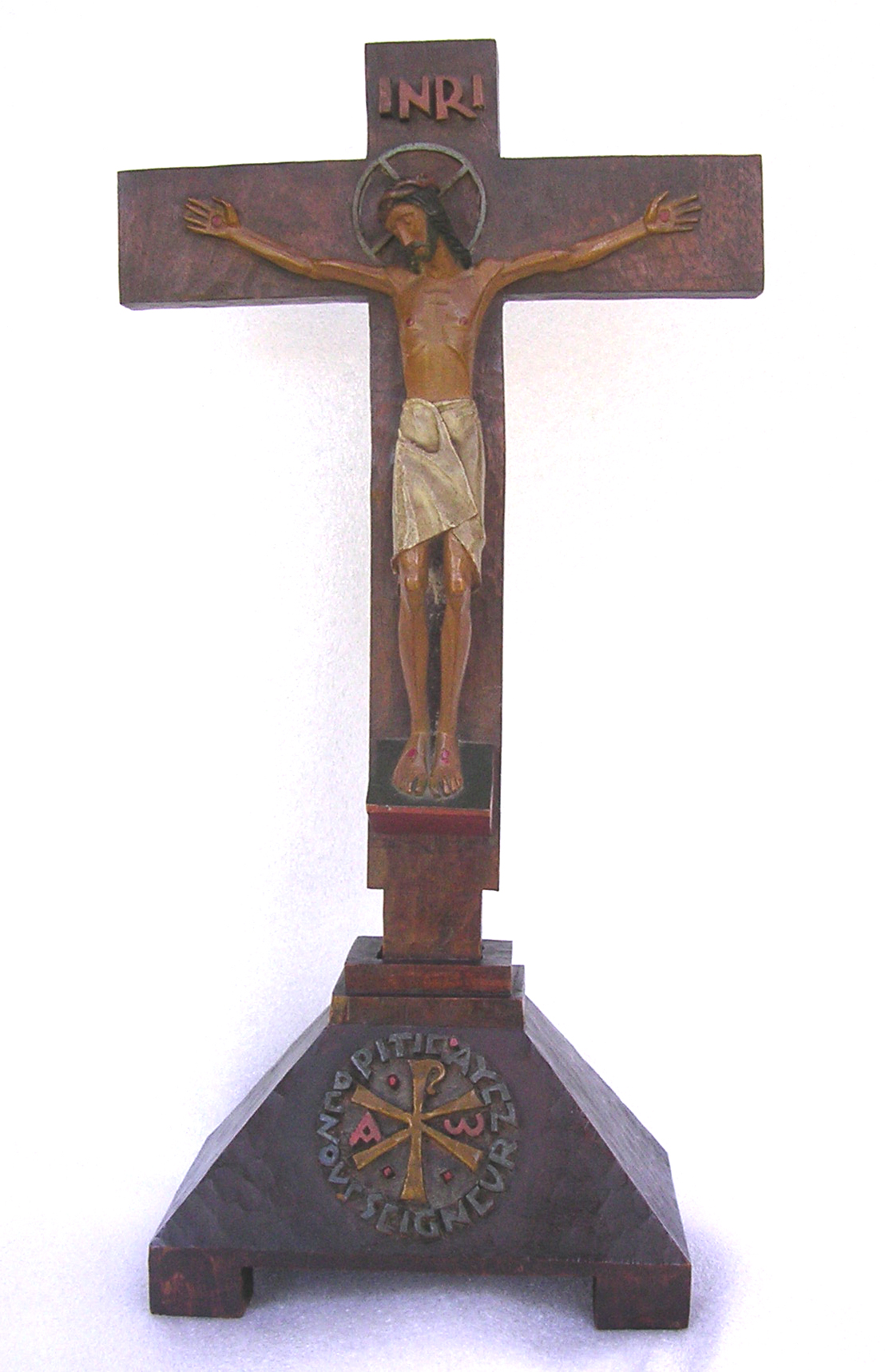
A crucifix

Denis Fernand Py, better known as Fernand Py, (1887–1949) was a "French sculptor" who "engraved religious medals with a modernist look" during the Art Deco period.

An artist of Christian sacred art, he is best known for his ivory carvings that adorn liturgical objects, his wooden statues, his nativity scenes, and his highly stylized medals with religious themes.

== Biography ==
=== Childhood and early youth ===
Py was born in Versailles France on January 10, 1887 and he died on September 1, 1949 in Sommeville France at the age of 62 years.

Py grew up in a modest house on the rue du Hasard in Versailles. His father, Louis Charles Py, was an engraver and a tailor. His mother, Eugénie Ernestine Gras, was a homemaker who raised Py along with his brothers Charles, Gaston, Marcel, and Georges as well as his sisters Marguerite and Alice.

Py had a hearing impairment which isolated him from other children his age and made him the object of bullying. According to Henri Brochet, Py was born hard of hearing while playwright and close friend, Henri Charlier, claimed that Py went deaf as a result of contracting typhoid fever. Charlier also claimed that at the age of 11 years in 1899, Py (along with his brothers Gaston and Marcel) went on "public assistance" for a time due to family hardships. Py's mother died, according to Charlier, in 1901 when Py was 13 years old.

=== Teen years and learning to carve wood ===
Py's uncle, who was an attorney, removed Py from his living situation approximately six months after the youth went on public assistance. When Py was 14 years old, his uncle placed him as an apprentice woodcarver with furniture manufacturers in the Faubourg Saint-Antoine suburb of Paris. He stayed there for three years, first as a simple apprentice and then as an apprentice worker. People took notice of Py and his talent because of his creative instinct. This was to the great displeasure of his employers who wanted Py to be content with reproducing the figures and patterns requested by customers.

A while after placing Py in his apprenticeship, his uncle died. Py completed his apprenticeship, but the furniture manufacturers did not have the funds to pay Py as a fully trained, entry level, full-time employee. In addition, his deafness made Py uncomfortable around his fellow employees and he was also no longer interested in repeatedly producing the same items as copies of old masters day in and day for customers. With his benefactor uncle gone, Py sought out other ways to make a living on his own while nourishing his artistic spirit.

=== Discovery and mastery of ivory carving ===
Around 1908, he became interested in ivory carving and began meeting with art dealers and antique dealers For these businessmen, he carved Christ and Blessed Virgin Mary figures and figurines in a medieval style. Even though he was intentionally sculpting in the style of a time period, he was beginning to sense a greater freedom in his art than when he copied masterworks for the furniture makers during his apprenticeship. He was already freer in terms of movement and the details of his figures. He was so skilled at mimicking the medieval style in his carving and sculptures that one of Py’s sculptures was authenticated by an expert as an original from the Middle Ages. Because of his strong Christian faith and morals, it was difficult for Py to accept that art dealers routinely misrepresented his work to buyers as authentic pieces from the medieval period.

=== Christian artist, friend of Charlier, and member of L'Arche ===
To get away from the misattribution and lies in the business world of art, Py moved to the countryside of France to "work in a more dignified moral atmosphere (and) to make statuettes or Christs that would go to churches or to Christians" The move, also, allowed him to free himself from copying others and to produce his own works.

In 1912, he met Henri Charlier and formed a strong friendship with him. Charlier shared his passion for hands-on carving (which he called his "spirit") with Py. He also helped Py to refine the aspects of artistic culture that he lacked. Charlier introduced him to Rodin, Cézanne, and Early Netherlandish painting (a.k.a. the Flemish primitives) among others.

Py and Charlier worked at creating art together from 1919 to 1923.

In 1920, he joined and worked with "L'Arche." This group of Christian artists was founded in 1917 by the architect Maurice Storez and Valentine Reyre. Its objective was to promote the revival of sacred art, in reaction to the Saint-Sulpician style which was still very present at the time, and to rediscover the spirit of the old craftsmen's guilds.

== Works ==
An example of his work is that of St. Patrick, Apostle of Ireland. Rather than depicting the typical elder man with a long beard wearing a Catholic priest chasuble and bishop's mitre carrying a shepherd's staff and pointing at snakes (or holding a shamrock), Py changed up the image. In Py's version of St. Patrick, the saint's body parts are not in proportion. His right hand shows the saint extending his middle and index fingers of the right hand (as in a sign for peace or victory). The depiction continues to wear the bishop's mitre and carries the shepherd's staff. The Py St. Patrick, though wears a button down cassock and cape as one might see an Anglican bishop wear. While the Py St. Patrick does not hold a shamrock (a symbol used to teach about the Triune God), but one is placed prominently nearby on the medal. The Patrick on this medal is beardless. In one corner of the medal are towers as one might assume Patrick envisioned in Armagh. Finally, around the image is the name of St. Patrick. It is not written in the vernacular, but in Latin (as Patrick spoke). Around the image, Py wrote "Sanctus Patricius" with letters that do not match in size.
