= Denis Barbe =

Seychellois footballer

Personal information
- Date of birth: 25 June 1978 (age 48)
- Place of birth: Seychelles
- Position: Midfielder

Senior career*
Years	Team	Apps	(Gls)
2003	Sunshine SC		
2004	Praslin Survivors		
2005–2013	Sunshine SC/St. Louis Suns		

International career
2003–2012	Seychelles	24	(0)
- * Club domestic league appearances and goals

Denis Barbe (born June 25, 1978) is a Seychellois footballer. He is a midfielder on the Seychelles national football team.

== See also ==
- Seychelles Football Federation
