= Denis Grachev =

Denis Grachev may refer to:

- Denis Grachev (fighter) (born 1982), Russian boxer, kickboxer and mixed martial artist
- Denis Grachev (badminton) (born 1992), Russian badminton player
