= Denis Barry (disambiguation) =

Denis (or Dennis) Barry (or Barrie) may refer to:

- Denis Barry (1929–2003), president of the United States Chess Federation from 1993 to 1996
- Dennis Barrie (born 1947), American museum director
- Denny Barry (1883–1923), Irish republican leader
- Dinny Barry-Murphy (1903–1973), Irish hurler from Cork

== See also ==
- Denis Barré (born 1948), Canadian sprint canoer
