= Denis Kozlov =

Denis Kozlov may refer to:

- Denis Kozlov (Belarusian footballer) for PMC Pastavy
- Denis Kozlov, Russian musician known under his artist name In R Voice
- Deniss Kozlovs (born 1983), Latvian judoka
