= Denis Emorine =

French poet, playwright, short-story writer, essayist and novelist

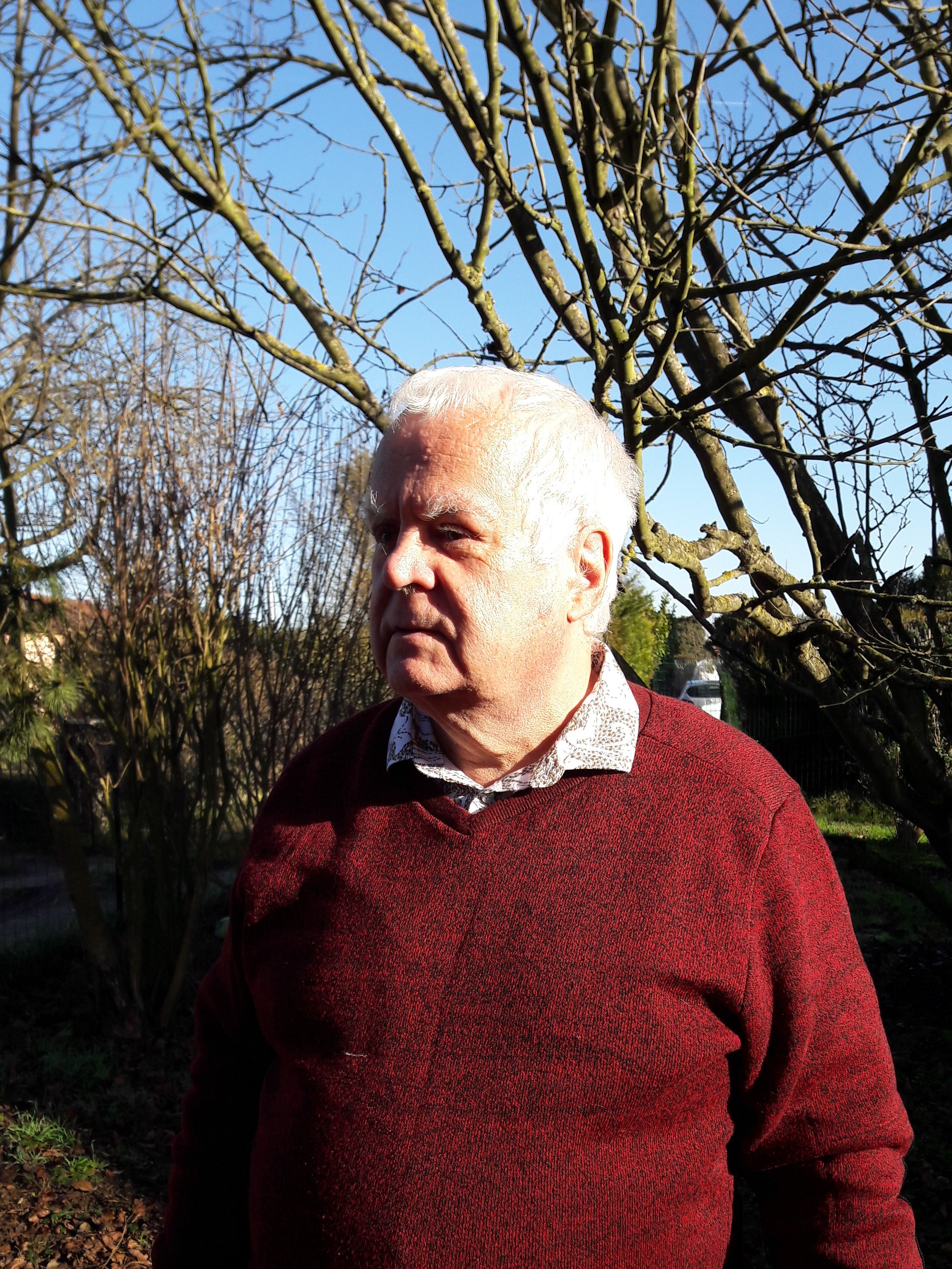
- Born: 1956 (age 69–70); Paris, France
- Education: Paris-Sorbonne University, novelist
- Occupations: Poet, essayist, playwright
- Writing career
- Notable works: Poems to Recite While Waiting for War (2012), Letters to Saïda (2011), On the Platform (2008), Side by Side (2006), No Through World (2002)
- Notable awards: Naji Naaman Literary Prize (Honor Prize for Complete Works) (2015); 1st prize of the Antonio Filoteo Omodei International Poetry Contest (2015); Poetry Prize of the Academy of Var (2009); 1st prize of the Feile Filiochta International Poetry Contest (2004)

Denis Emorine (born 1956, near Paris) is a French poet, playwright, short-story writer, essayist, and novelist.

== Life and work ==
Denis Emorine was born in 1956 in Paris. He holds a B.A. in French language and literature. Emorine is an alumnus of Paris-Sorbonne University. He has an emotional attachment to English because his mother was an English teacher. He is of Russian ancestry on his father's side. His poetry and plays have been translated into several languages (English, Russian, Japanese, Hungarian) Danish, German). His theatrical output has been staged in France, Canada and Russia. Many of his books (short stories, plays, poetry) have been published in Greece, Romania, India, Japan, Italy, South Africa and the United States. Denis Emorine collaborates with various other reviews and literary websites in the US, in Europe and Japan both in French and in English. Several reviews and essays have been published on his poetry in English, in French and in Romanian. In 2004, Denis Emorine was awarded first prize at the Feile Filiochta International Poetry Contest. In 2009, he received the poetry prize of the Academy of Var. His collection of poems, Bouria, des mots dans la tourmente was recognized by the first prize of the Antonio Filoteo Omodei International Poetry Contest in 2015. In 2015, Denis Emorine was awarded the Naji Naaman Literary Prize Lebanon (honor prize for complete work).

In 2010, Anemone Sidecar dedicated its eighth issue to the poems of Denis Emorine. His poetry has been published in many reviews and magazines worldwide such as Francopolis, Levure littéraire, Recours au Poème (France), Mad Hatters Review, Cipher Journal, Pedestal Magazine, Journal of Experimental Fiction, Wilderness House Literary Review, Snow Monkey, Cokefishing, Be Which Magazine, Anemone Sidecar, The Salt River Review, Sketchbook, Literary World (United States), Pphoo (India), Blue Beat Jacket (Japan), Magnapoets (Canada), Istanbul Literary Review. In 2017, his poem Je te rejoindrai was translated in English and Bengali and published in the Amaravati Poetic Prism international poetry anthology in India.

=== Themes ===
Writing, for Emorine, is a way of harnessing time in its incessant flight. Themes that re-occur throughout his writing include the Doppelgänger, lost or shattered identity, and mythical Venice, a place that truly fascinates him. He also has a great interest for Eastern Europe. The poetry of Emorine invites us to participate in the birth of the world. In his poetry, the "I trembles with life, with love, with death and like a magic well in turn is emptied and refilled with emotions and sensations". His poetry is the research of the eternal through beauty, love, tenderness and the profoundness of the soul and of the self.

== Prizes and awards ==
- 2015: Naji Naaman Literary Prize (Honor Prize for Complete Works)
- 2015: 1st prize of the Antonio Filoteo Omodei International Poetry Contest
- 2009: Poetry Prize of the Academy of Var
- 2004: 1st prize of the Feile Filiochta International Poetry Contest

== Literary activities ==
=== Readings, lectures and writing workshops at universities and schools ===
- Denmark: Gammel-Hellerup High School (Copenhagen), teacher : Génia Jensen. Preparations for the school-leaving examination in French, from 2002 to 2006.
- United States: Barnard College-Columbia University (New York City), teacher: Phillip John Usher, 2008.
- France: Claude Le Lorrain Secondary School (Nancy, France), teacher: Annabelle Saffroy, 2010–2011.
- Germany: Maria-Sybilla-Merian High School (Krefeld), teacher: Armin Volkmar Wernsing, 2011.
- France: Alliance française Paris Île-de-France, teacher: Isabelle Macor-Filarska, 2012.
- Hungary: Lectures on contemporary French and Francophone poetry (Department of French Studies – Eötvös Loránd University, Budapest, 2014.
- France: Secondary School Jeanne D'Arc (Mulhouse). Teacher, Nathalie Boetsch. Lecture on poetry "La mort en berne", 2018.
- Italy: Università del Salento (Lecce), Professor, Marcella Leopizzi. Videoconference "Writing or the substantiation of being. Meeting a contemporary french writer", 2020.

== Scholarly publications on the author ==
- Dominique Zinenberg (Francopolis): "Denis Emorine, Fertilité de l’abîme", Francopolis, November 2017,
- Jane Hervé (Recours au Poème): "Fil de lecture autour de Marilyne Bertoncini, Denis Emorine et Jasna Samic", Recours au Poème 2017.
- Károly Sándor Pallai (Eötvös Loránd University):
1. "La psychologie des profondeurs et la cartographie de la mort dans «La mort en berne» de Denis Emorine", Mondes Francophones, Louisiana State University, 2017, pp. 1–8.
2. "A fájdalom és emlékezet architektonikája", Bouria : Szavak a viharban, Underground Kiadó, Budapest, 2017, pp. 9–16.
3. "Poèmes d’amour et de mort à déchirer avant la guerre", Fertilité de l’abîme, Éditions Unicité, Saint-Chéron (Essonne), 2017, pp. 9–14. and Mondes Francophones, Louisiana State University
- Sonia Elvireanu (University of Cluj): "Denis Emorine, La mort en berne ou l’autofiction romanesque", La mort en berne, 5 Sens Éditions, Geneva, 2017, pp. 9–11.
- Boris Hainaud: "Une blessure qui perdure et hante chaque poème", Psaumes du mensonge, Ars Longa, Bucharest, 2016, pp. 8–13.
- Thór Stefánsson (reviewer, translator) : "Toute littérature valable a une signification multiple", Bouria : Des mots dans la tourmente, Éditions du Cygne, Paris, 2014, pp. 13–18.
- Isabelle Macor-Filarska (Alliance Française de Paris) : "Où porter notre regard", Les yeux de l’horizon, Éditions du Cygne, Paris, 2012, pp. 11–16.
- Armin Volkmar Wernsing (linguist, researcher): "Toute œuvre poétique est l’utopie d’un monde en ordre", Ces mots qui font saigner le temps, Éditions du Cygne, Paris, 2009, pp. 9–13.
- Stella Vinitchi Radulescu (Northwestern University): "La quête de l’unité", Lettres à Saïda, Éditions du Cygne, Paris, 2008, pp. 10–13.

== Works ==
=== Poetry in English ===
- Poems to Recite While Waiting for War, Oliver James Press, 2012.
- Letters to Saïda, (translated by Brian Cole), Červená Barva Press, 2011.
- Side by Side, FootHills Publishing, 2006.
- No Through World, (translated by Phillip John Usher), Ravenna Press, 2002.

=== Plays in English ===
- The Visit, (translated by Brian Cole), Off the Walls Plays, South Africa, 2013.
- After the Battle, Big Dog Plays, United States, 2013.
- The Mistake, (translated by Flavia Cosma), JAC Publishing, United States, 2012.
- Closing Time, (translated by Brian Cole), JAC Publishing, United States, 2011.
- Passions, (translated by Brian Cole), Červená Barva Press, United States, 2010.
- On the Platform, (translated by Brian Cole), Červená Barva Press, United States, 2008.

=== Poetry in French ===
- Éphémérides, Éditions Saint-Germain-des-Prés, 1982.
- Étranglement d'ajour, Éditions Solidaritude, 1984.
- Sillage du miroir, La Bartavelle Éditeur, 1994.
- Par intermittence, La Bartavelle Éditeur, 1997.
- Ellipses, Amis de Hors-Jeu Éditions, 1999.
- Rivages contigus (with Isabelle Poncet-Rimaud), Editinter, 2002.
- Lettres à Saïda, Éditions du Cygne, 2008.
- Dans le temps divisé, Le Nouvel Athanor, 2008.
- Ces mots qui font saigner le temps, Éditions du Cygne, 2009.
- Vaciller la vie, Éditions du Cygne, 2010.
- Les yeux de l’horizon, Éditions du Cygne, 2012.
- De toute éternité, Le Nouvel Athanor, 2012.
- Bouria, des mots dans la tourmente, Éditions du Cygne, 2014. Translated in Greek (Vakxikon, 2015), published in Hungarian (translation and foreword by Károly Sándor Pallai, Underground, 2017)
- Psaumes du mensonge, Psalmii minciunii, bilingual edition French-Romanian, Ars Longa, 2016.
- Fertilité de l'abîme, Éditions Unicité, 2017.
- Prélude à un nouvel exil. Poèmes suspendus à la frontière, Éditions Unicité, 2018.

=== Novels in French ===
- La mort en berne, 5 Sens, 2017.

=== Novels in English ===
- Death at Half Mast, JEF Books, United States, 2019.

=== Non-fiction ===
- Qu'est-ce que la littérature érotique ? Soixante écrivains répondent, collective book, (Éditions Zulma / La Maison des Écrivains), 1993.
- Ciseler l'absence, aphorismes et autres humeurs, La Bartavelle Éditeur, 1996.
- Au chevet des mots, Éditions du Gril, 1998, Belgium; Éditions Poiêtês, 2006, Luxembourg.
- L’écriture ou la justification d’être, choix de textes: entretien, nouvelles, théâtre et journal, Soleil Natal, « Fresque d’écrivain » collection, 2000.
- Dans les impasses du monde, Éditions du Gril 2002, Belgium.
- À la croisée des signes, divagations sur l’écriture, Soleil Natal, 2006.

=== Short stories ===
- Failles, Éditions Lacombe, 1989.
- Identités, L'Ancrier Éditeur, 1994. Translated and published in Romanian, Éditions Nemira, Bucharest, 1995.
- L’Âge de raison, Approches Éditions, 2009.
- De ma fenêtre, Chloé des Lys, 2011, Belgium.
- Triptyque vénitien, Triptic venetian, bilingual edition French-Romanian, Ars Longa, 2014.
- Valses tristes, Valsuri triste, bilingual edition French-Romanian, Ars Longa, 2016.

=== Plays in French ===
- La Méprise suivi de La Visite, Editinter, 1998; Clapàs, 2006.
- Passions, Editions Clapàs 2002.
- Passions/La Visite (Bengali translation) Éditions Pphoo, India, 2003.
- Sur le quai/On the Platform, bilingual edition French-English, Cervena Barva Press, United States, 2008.
- L’Heure de la fermeture suivi de Louis II et de Passions, Simple Edition, Canada, 2009.
- Sur le quai/Après la bataille, bilingual edition French-Romanian, Ars Longa, 2013. Translated in Greek, (Vakxikon, 2014)

=== Anthologies ===
- Mille poètes – Mille poèmes brefs, L’Arbre à paroles, 1997, Belgium.
- Livre d’or pour la paix: anthologie de la littérature pacifique, Éditions Joseph Ouaknine, 2008.
- Stranger at Home: American Poetry with an Accent, Numina Press, United States, 2008.
- L’année poétique 2009, Seghers, 2009.
- Visages de poésie, tome 3, Rafael de Surtis, 2010.
- Poètes pour Haïti, L’Harmattan, 2011.
- Butterfly away, Magnapoets, Canada, 2011.
- L’Athanor des poètes, anthologie 1991–2011, Le Nouvel Athanor, 2011.
- Poètes français et marocains, anthology 1, Polyglotte-C.i.c.c.a.t., 2013.
- Ouvrir le XXIème siècle, 80 poètes québécois et français, Moebius/Cahiers du Sens, 2013.
- À la dérive : poèmes et témoignages sur l'exil et les naufragés du monde, CreateSpace Independent Publishing Platform, 2015.
- World Poetry Yearbook 2014, The Earth Culture Press, China, 2015.
- World Poetry Yearbook 2015, The Earth Culture Press, China, 2016.
- Amaravati Poetic Prism 2017, The Cultural Centre of Vijayawada & Amaravati, India, 2017.
- Éloge et défense de la langue française, Unicité, 2016.
- Composition étoilée, Incipit en W, 2018.
- Liens et entrelacs, poètes du monde, CreateSpace Independent Publishing Platform, 2018.
- Paix! 123 Poètes francophones planétaires, 12 Artistes visuels pour une Paix universelle, Éditions Unicité, 2018.
- Plus de cent frontières, poèmes, Éditions Pourquoi viens-tu si tard?/Jeudi des mots, 2023

=== Fictions ===
- A Step Inside, Červená Barva Press, 2023 (USA).

=== Collective book ===
- « Albert Camus, Henriette Grindat, René Char. Avec le soleil pour témoin », in : La poésie au cœur des arts, conference proceedings of the Academy of Var, Toulon, 2010.
