= Denis Barrett =

Anglican priest in New Zealand

Denis Barrett, MBE was an Anglican priest in New Zealand in the 20th century.

Barrett was ordained a deacon in 1959 and a priest in 1960. He was Chaplain to the Bishop of Nelson then Vicar of Waimea from 1960 to 1966; and of Wairau from 1966 to 1970. He was Archdeacon of Māwhera from 1970 until 1976.
