= Denis Burke =

Denis Burke may refer to:

- Denis Burke (Irish politician) (1904–1971), Irish politician, senator (1948–1961)
- Denis Burke (Australian politician) (born 1948), Australian politician, Chief Minister of the Northern Territory (1999–2001)

== See also ==
- Dennis K. Burke (born 1962), U.S. Attorney for the District of Arizona (2009–2011)
