= Denis Ignashin =

Russian ice hockey player (born 1988)

- Born: March 31, 1988 (age 36); Cherepovets, Russia
- Height: 5 ft 10 in (178 cm)
- Weight: 176 lb (80 kg; 12 st 8 lb)
- Position: Forward
- Shoots: Left
- VHL team Former teams: Torpedo Ust-Kamenogorsk; HC Spartak Moscow
- NHL draft: Undrafted
- Playing career: 2010–present

Denis Ignashin (Денис Игнашин, born March 31, 1988) is a Russian ice hockey player. He is currently playing with Torpedo Ust-Kamenogorsk of the Supreme Hockey League (VHL).

Ignashin played eighteen games in the Kontinental Hockey League (KHL) with HC Spartak Moscow during the 2013–14 KHL season.
