= Denis Jack =

Scottish footballer (born 1941)

Personal information
- Date of birth: 12 January 1941 (age 85)
- Place of birth: Cowdenbeath, Scotland
- Position: Left back

Youth career
- –1961: Cowdenbeath Royals

Senior career*
Years	Team	Apps	(Gls)
1961–1971	Cowdenbeath	279	(4)
1971–1972	Forfar Athletic	8	(0)
- * Club domestic league appearances and goals

Denis Jack (born 12 January 1941) is a Scottish retired professional footballer who made over 280 appearances as a left back in the Scottish League for Cowdenbeath and Forfar Athletic.

== Career statistics ==
Appearances and goals by club, season and competition
Club	Season	League			Scottish Cup		League Cup		Total	
Club	Season	Division	Apps	Goals	Apps	Goals	Apps	Goals	Apps	Goals
Forfar Athletic	1971–72	Scottish Second Division	8	0	0	0	4	0	12	0
Career total			8	0	0	0	4	0	12	0

== Honours ==
Cowdenbeath

- Scottish League Second Division second-place promotion: 1969–70

Individual

- Cowdenbeath Hall of Fame
