= Denis Stairs =

Denis Stairs may refer to:

- Denis Stairs (engineer) (1889–1980), Canadian engineer and businessman
- Denis Stairs (political scientist) (born 1939), professor of political science
