= Denis McBride =

Denis McBride may refer to:

- Denis McBride (priest), Redemptorist priest from Scotland
- Denis McBride (rugby union) (born 1964), retired Irish rugby union player
