= Denis Donoghue =

Denis Donoghue may refer to:

- Denis Donoghue (academic) (1928–2021), Irish literary critic
- Denis Donoghue (rugby league) (1926–1993), Australian rugby league footballer
