= Denis Butler =

Denis Butler may refer to:

- Denis J. Butler (1926–2010), American member of the New York State Assembly
- Denis Butler, 9th Earl of Lanesborough (1918–1998), Anglo-Irish aristocrat

== See also ==
- Dennis Butler (born 1944), English football player and manager
- Dennis Butler (footballer, born 1943), English footballer
- Dennis E. Butler (born 1940), American politician from Iowa
