= Denis Obua =

Denis Obua may refer to:

- Denis Obua (footballer) (1947–2010), soccer player for the Uganda national team
- Denis Obua (politician) (born 1980), Minister of State for Sports in Uganda's cabinet
