= Denis Prieur =

Denis Prieur may refer to:

- Denis Prieur (mayor) (1791–1857), 10th mayor of New Orleans, Louisiana
- Denis Prieur (painter) (born 1957), French painter
