= Dionysius (disambiguation) =

Dionysius is a Romanized form of the Greek name Dionysios.

Dionysius in its different grammatical cases may refer to:

== People ==
- Dionysius the Areopagite, early Christian convert and saint
- Pseudo-Dionysius the Areopagite, a pseudepigraphical Christian theologian and mystic
- Dionysius of Halicarnassus, 1st century BC historian
- Dionysius Exiguus, inventor of the Anno Domini dating system
- Dionysius, a Greek orator and teacher of Marcus Cornelius Fronto
- Dionysius Patrick O'Brien (1934–2022), English musician
- Dionysius of Alexandria, a third century ecumenical figure
- Dionysius I of Syracuse, 5th century BC tyrant of Syracuse

== Places ==
- Agios Dionyssios, Patras, a neighbourhood in the city of Patras, Greece
- Dionysiou Monastery, an Eastern Orthodox monastery at the monastic state of Mount Athos in Greece
- St Dionysius' Church, Market Harborough, a church of the Church of England, Leicestershire
- St. Dionysius Institute in Paris, an Orthodox Christian theological institute in Paris, France
- Dionysiou Areopagitou Street, a street in Athens

== Scientific ==
- Dionysia (plant), a plant genus
- Dionysius (crater), a lunar impact crater

== Other ==
- Dionysius (album), a 1983 album by jazz drummer Dannie Richmond
- Dionysia, a large festival in ancient Athens in honor of the god Dionysus
- Dionysius (journal), a classics publication of Dalhousie University
- Codex Athous Dionysiou, a manuscript of the New Testament

== See also ==
- Deioneus: Deon, Deion, Deone, Dion, Dione, Dionne
- Dionysius: Dionis, Dionisi, Dionisia, Dionisie, Dionisi, Dionisije, Dionisio, Dionisius/Dionisiy, Dionys, Dionysio, Dionysios, Dionysious
  - Denice (disambiguation, given name), Denis (given name, surname), Denisa, Denise (disambiguation, given name), Deniska, Denni, Dennis, Dennise, Deniss, Denisse, Denny (given name, surname), Dennys, Denys, Denyse
- Dionysious (disambiguation)
- Saint Dionysius (disambiguation)
- Dionysos (disambiguation)
- Patriarch Dionysius (disambiguation)
- Dionysius III (disambiguation)
- Dionysus, a Greek god
