= Dionysius =

The name Dionysius (/daɪəˈniːʒəs, -ˈnɪʒ-, -ˈnɪziəs, -ˈniːziəs/; Greek: Διονύσιος Dionysios, "of Dionysus"; Latin: Dionysius) was common in classical and post-classical times. Etymologically it is a nominalized adjective formed with a -ios suffix from the stem Dionys- of the name of the Greek god, Dionysus, parallel to Apollon-ios from Apollon, with meanings of Dionysos' and Apollo's, etc. The exact beliefs attendant on the original assignment of such names remain unknown.

Regardless of the language of origin of Dionysos and Apollon, the -ios/-ius suffix is associated with a full range of endings of the first and second declension in the Greek and Latin languages. The names may thus appear in ancient writing in any of their cases. Dionysios itself refers only to males. The feminine version of the name is Dionysia, nominative case, in both Greek and Latin. The name of the plant and the festival, Dionysia, is the neuter plural nominative, which looks the same in English from both languages. Dionysiou is the masculine and neuter genitive case of the Greek second declension. Dionysias is not the -ios suffix.

Although in most cases transmuted, the name remains in many modern languages, such as English Dennis (Denis, Denys, Denise). The latter names have lost the suffix altogether, using Old French methods of marking the feminine, Denise. The modern Greek (closest to the original) is Dionysios or Dionysis. The Spanish is Dionisio. The Italian is Dionigi and the last name, Dionisi. Like Caesar in secular contexts, Dionysius sometimes became a title in religious contexts; for example, Dionysius was the episcopal title of the primates of Malankara Church (founded by Apostle Thomas in India) from 1765 until the amalgamation of that title with Catholicos of the East in 1934.

== People named Dionysius ==
=== Secular classical contexts ===
==== Athletics ====
- Dionysius of Alexandria (athlete), fl. 129 AD, last winner of the stadion race at the Olympic Games of the times

==== Science and philosophy ====
- Dionysius of Chalcedon, fl. 320 BC, philosopher of Megarian school
- Dionysius of Cyrene, Stoic philosopher and mathematician, c. 150 BC
- Dionysius of Lamptrai, 3rd century BC, an Epicurean philosopher and head of the "Garden"
- Dionysius Periegetes, Greek geographer, 2nd or 3rd century
- Dionysius the Renegade, Stoic philosopher from Heraclea who became a Cyrenaic, c. 300 BC

==== Letters ====
- Aelius Dionysius, Greek rhetorician from Halicarnassus (fl. early 2nd century)
- Cassius Dionysius, Greek agricultural writer (2nd cent. BC)
- Dionysius Chalcus, Athenian elegiac poet (5th century BC)
- Dionysius of Byzantium, Greek geographer (2nd century CE)
- Dionysius of Halicarnassus, Greek historian of the Roman period (c. 60 BC – after 7 BC)
- Dionysius of Miletus, Greek ethnographer and historian (fl. perhaps in the 5th century BC)
- Dionysius Thrax, Greek grammarian (2nd century BC)

==== Politics ====
- Dionysius (ambassador), 3rd century BC, ambassador to the court of the Indian ruler Ashoka
- Dionysius (Athenian Commander), an Athenian naval commander during the Corinthian War
- Dionysius I of Syracuse (c. 432 – 367 BC), also called Dionysius the Elder, ruler of Syracuse in Sicily
- Dionysius II of Syracuse (c. 397 BC – 343 BC), also called Dionysius the Younger, son of the preceding
- Dionysius of Heraclea, tyrant of Heraclea Pontica, 4th century BC
- Dionysius of Phocaea, commander of the Ionian fleet at the Battle of Lade, 494 BC
- Lucius Aelius Helvius Dionysius, 4th century, Roman Proconsul and Praefectus Urbi
- Dionysios Soter, r. 65-55 BC, Indo-Greek king in the area of eastern Punjab

=== Christian contexts ===
==== Before 1000 AD ====
- Dionysius the Areopagite, Athenian judge who was converted by Paul of Tarsus and became Bishop of Athens
- Dionysius of Vienne, d. 193, Bishop of Vienne, Gaul
- Dionysius of Corinth, 2nd-century bishop
- Faustus, Abibus and Dionysius of Alexandria, d. 250, three Christian martyrs
- Dionysius, 3rd-century Christian martyr and saint, noted in Theodore, Philippa and companions
- Dionysius of Alexandria, 3rd-century Egyptian bishop
- Pope Dionysius, 259–268
- Dionysius (bishop of Milan), also called Dionysius of Milan, bishop of Milan 349-355, saint
- Pseudo-Dionysius the Areopagite (5th century), name claimed by a pseudonymous writer, identified by some with Georgian theologian Peter the Iberian (411–491), author of Corpus Areopagiticum
- Dionysius Exiguus (c. 470–c. 540), monk from Scythia Minor who invented the Anno Domini era
- Dionysius I Telmaharoyo (d. 848), Syriac Orthodox patriarch of Antioch
- Dionysius II of Antioch (d. 908/909), Syriac Orthodox patriarch of Antioch

==== 1000 AD to before 1600 AD ====
- Dionysius (Zbyruyskyy), d. 1603, first Ukrainian Catholic bishop
- Dionysius (Archdeacon of Aghadoe), 12th cent., first recorded Archdeacon of Aghadoe
- Dionysius bar Salibi, member of Syrian Jacobite Church in the 12th century, best known for his commentary on biblical texts
- Dionysius bar Masih, d. 1204, illegitimate Maphrian of the East of the Syriac Orthodox Church
- Dionysius, Metropolitan of Kiev (c. 1300–1385), 14th century orthodox prelate
- Dionysius (Dean of Armagh), Irish cleric, Dean of Armagh 1301–1330
- Dionysius I of Constantinople, Saint, reigned from 1466 to 1471 and from 1488 to 1490
- Dionisius (late 15th century–early 16th century), also called Dionysius the Wise, Russian medieval icon-painter
- Dionysios Skylosophos (1560 AD–1611 AD), Epirotian Greek monk who led two farmer revolts against the Ottoman Turks
- Dionysius Ó Donnchadha, 1441-1478, Bishop of Kilmacduagh
- Dionysius Ó Mórdha, d. 1534, Bishop of Clonfert, Ireland
- Dionysius Part, d. 1475, auxiliary Bishop of Mainz
- Dionysius II of Constantinople, reigned from 1546 to 1556
- Dionysios of Zakynthos, 15th century Orthodox Christian Archbishop of Aegina
- Dionysios of Olympus, Saint, founded the Agios Dionysios Monastery, Olympus

==== 1600 AD and after ====
- Blessed Dionysius of the Nativity, French sailor, Portuguese knight, and Carmelite martyr
- Dionysius of Fourna, 1670-1744, Christian monk and author
- Dionysios Mantoukas, 1648-1751, the Greek Orthodox bishop of Kastoria, Western Macedonia, modern Greece, from 1694 to 1719
- Mar Dionysius I (died 1808), also known as Mar Dionysius the Great or Marthoma VI, Metropolitan of the Malankara Church (in India)
- Pulikkottil Joseph Mar Dionysious II, 1833-1909, Malankara Metropolitan
- Geevarghese Mar Dionysius of Vattasseril (1858-1934), also known as Mar Dionysius VI, Metropolitan of Malankara Church (in India), Saint
- Dionysius Kfoury, 1879-1965, bishop of the Melkite Greek Catholic Archeparchy of Alexandria
- Dionysios Bairaktaris, 1927-2011, Greek Orthodox metropolitan bishop of Chios, Psara, and Inousses
- Dionysios Mantalos, 1952-2025, Metropolitan bishop of Corinth

=== Modern contexts ===
==== Athletics ====
- Dionisis Angelopoulos, 1992-, Greek rower
- Dionysios Dimou, Olympic sailor
- Dionysios Georgakopoulos, 1963-, Greek sport shooter
- Dionysios Iliadis, Greek judoka, or Judo competitor
- Dionysios Kasdaglis, 1872-1931, Greek-Egyptian tennis player
- Dionysios Vasilopoulos, 1902-1964, Greek swimmer
- Dionysius Hayom Rumbaka, 1988-, Indonesian badminton player
- Dionysius Sebwe, 1969-, retired Liberian athlete

==== Fine arts ====
- Dionysio Miseroni, 1607-1661, Bohemian jeweler and stonecutter
- Dionysios Demetis, Greek composer
- Dionysios Solomos, 1798-1857, author of Greek Hymn to Liberty.
- Dionysios Tsokos, 1814-1862, Greek painter
- Dionysios Vegias, 1810-1884, Greek painter of the later Heptanese School
- Dionysis Makris, Greek singer
- Dionysis Papagiannopoulos, Greek actor
- Dionysis Savvopoulos, Greek songwriter, lyricist and singer
- Dionysius Rodotheatos, 1849-1892, Greek conductor and composer
- Georg Dionysius Ehret, 1708-1770, botanical illustrator
- Stratos Dionysiou, 1935-1990, a Greek laika and elafro-laika singer

==== Letters ====
- B. R. Dionysius, 1969-, Australian poet, editor, arts administrator and educator
- Benjamin Musaphia (1606–1675), Jewish doctor, scholar, and kabbalist, who sometimes called himself Dionysius
- Dionysios Kokkinos, 1884-1967, Greek historian and writer
- Dionysios Solomos (1798–1857), Greek poet
- Dionysios Zakythinos, 1905-1993, Greek Byzantinist
- Dionysius Andreas Freher, 1649-1728, commentator on Jacob Boehme
- Dionysius Godefridus van der Keessel, 1738-1816, Dutch jurist and educator to the royal house
- Dionysius Lardner (1793–1859), Irish scientific writer
- Dionysius Vossius, 1612-1635, Dutch translator

==== Science ====
- Dionysios Ikkos, 1921-1993, Greek endocrinologist

==== Politics ====
- Dionysia-Theodora Avgerinopoulou (born 1975), Greek lawyer and politician
- Dionysius Adrianus Petrus Norbertus Koolen, 1871-1945, Dutch politician
- Dionysius Wakering (born 1617), English Parliamentarian

== See also ==
- Deioneus: Deon, Deion, Deone, Dion, Dione, Dionne
- Dionysius: Dionis, Dionisi, Dionisia, Dionisie, Dionisi, Dionisije, Dionisio, Dionisius/Dionisiy, Dionys, Dionysio, Dionysios, Dionysious
  - Denice (disambiguation, given name), Denis (given name, surname), Denisa, Denise (disambiguation, given name), Deniska, Denni, Dennis, Dennise, Deniss, Denisse, Denny (given name, surname), Dennys, Denys, Denyse
- Dionysos (disambiguation)
- Patriarch Dionysius (disambiguation)
- Dionysius III (disambiguation)
