= Denny (given name) =

Denny or Dennie is a given name or nickname, primarily masculine and often a short form (hypocorism) of Dennis, Denise, Denver, Denzel, Zdenko, or Zdenka which may refer to:

== People ==
=== Denny ===
- Denny Abdi (born 1970), Indonesian diplomat
- Denny Agus (born 2000), Indonesian footballer
- Denny Altes (born 1948), American politician
- Denny Antwi (born 1993), Ghanaian footballer
- Denny Ashburnham (c.1628–1697), English landowner and politician
- Denny Barry (1883–1923), Irish patriot
- Denny Bautista (born 1980), Dominican baseball player
- Denny Bixler (1940–1981), American politician
- Denny Borsboom (born 1973), Dutch psychologist and psychometrician
- Denny Brown (born 1956), American professional wrestler
- Denny Bruce (born 1944), American record producer and music manager
- Denny Cagur, (born 1977), Indonesian comedian and TV host
- Denny Caknan (born 1993), Indonesian singer-songwriter and actor
- Denny Cardin (born 1988), Italian footballer
- Denny Carmassi (born 1947), American drummer
- Denny Chin (born 1954), American federal judge
- Denny Chronopoulos (1968–2000), Canadian football player
- Denny Clanton (born 1982), American soccer player
- Denny Clare (1853–1928), American baseball player
- Denny Cochran (1915–1992), American football player
- Denny Coffman, American politician
- Denny Cordell (1943–1995), English record producer
- Denny Crawford (1921–2005), American football player
- Denny Crum (1937–2023), American basketball coach
- Denny Curran (1875–1968), Irish Gaelic footballer and politician
- Denny Delk (born 1950), American actor
- Denny DeMarchi (1962–2020), Canadian musician
- Denny Dennis (1913–1993), British singer
- Denny Dent (1948–2004), American painter
- Denny Despert (1891–1931), American baseball player
- Denny Diante, American music producer, arranger and engineer
- Denny Dias (born 1946), American guitarist
- Denny Dillon (born 1951), American actress and comedian
- Denny Doherty (1940–2007), Canadian musician and former member of the folk group The Mamas & the Papas
- Denny Doyle (1944–2022), American baseball player
- Denny Doyle (politician) (born 1948), American politician
- Denny Driscoll (1855–1886), American baseball player
- Denny Duron (born 1952), American football player and coach
- Denny Ebbers (1974–2015), Dutch judoka
- Denny Edge (1903–1954), Canadian-American ice hockey player and coach
- Denny Elliot (1914–1998), American basketball player
- Denny Emerson (born 1941), American equestrian
- Denny Felsner (born 1970), American ice hockey player
- Denny Fercho (born 1969), American handball player
- Denny Fitzpatrick, American basketball player
- Denny Martin Flinn (1947–2007), American novelist
- Denny Flynn, American bull rider
- Denny Freeman (1944–2021), American guitarist
- Denny Galehouse (1911–1998), American baseball player
- Denny Gigliotti (born 1991), Italian footballer
- Denny González (born 1963), Dominican baseball player
- Denny Greene (1949–2015), American singer
- Denny Gropper (born 1999), Israeli footballer
- Denny Guka, Anglican Papua New Guinean priest and bishop
- Denny Gulick (born 1936), American mathematician
- Denny Hadican, American retired soccer player
- Denny Hamlin (born 1980), American NASCAR auto racer
- Denny Harriger (born 1969), American baseball player
- Denny Heck (born 1952), American politician
- Denny Hernández (born 1994), Cuban volleyball player
- Denny Herzig (born 1984), German footballer
- Denny Hickey (1890–1965), American racing driver
- Denny Hocking (born 1970), American baseball player
- Denny Holman (born 1945), American basketball player
- Denny Hoskins (born 1974), American politician
- Denny Huang (1920–2007), Hong Kong doctor and politician
- Denny Hughes (1894–1953), American football player
- Denny Hulme (1938–1992), New Zealand Formula One auto racer
- Denny Ingram (born 1976), English footballer
- Denny Januar Ali (born 1963), Indonesian journalist
- Denny Johnstone (born 1995), Scottish footballer
- Denny Jones (1910–2012), American politician
- Denny Kalyalya (born 1957), Governor of Bank of Zambia
- Denny Kantono (born 1970), Indonesian retired badminton player
- Denny Laine (1944–2023), English rock musician
- Denny Lambert (born 1970), Canadian ice hockey player
- Denny Lambert (athletic director), American athletics administrator
- Denny Lambert (rugby league) (born 1980), Australian rugby league player
- Denny Landzaat (born 1976), Dutch footballer
- Denny Lane (1818–1895), Irish businessman and nationalist public figure
- Denny Lawrence, Australian actor, writer, producer and director
- Denny Lemaster (1939–2024), American baseball player
- Denny Love (born 1992), American actor
- Denny Lyons (1866–1929), American baseball player
- Denny Mack (1850–1888), American baseball player and manager
- Denny Marcin (1942–2017), American football coach
- Denny Matthews (born 1942), American sportscaster
- Denny McCarthy (born 1993), American golfer
- Denny McKnight (1848–1900), American baseball executive
- Denny McLain (born 1944), American baseball player
- Denny McNamara (born 1952), American politician
- Denny Méndez (born 1978), Dominican-Italian actress and model
- Denny Miller (1934–2014), American actor
- Denny Moore, American linguist
- Denny Morrison (born 1985), Canadian world and Olympic champion speedskater
- Denny Moyer (1939–2010), American boxer, world light middleweight champion
- Denny Mundee (born 1968), English footballer
- Denny Myers (1905–1957), American football player and coach
- Denny Neagle (born 1968), American baseball player
- Denny Nunnelley, American politician
- Denny O'Brien (born 1973), American columnist, journalist and radio commentator
- Denny Price (1938–2000), American basketball player
- Denny R. (born 1994), Filipino author under the pen name HaveYouSeenThisGirL
- Denny Randell, American songwriter and record producer
- Denny Rehberg (born 1955), American politician
- Denny Riddleberger (born 1945), American baseball player
- Denny Rodgers (born 1968), Canadian politician
- Denny Rumba (born 1985), Indonesian footballer
- Denny Samko (born 2000), Czech footballer
- Denny Sanford (born 1935), American businessman
- Denny Seiwell (born 1943), American rock musician
- Denny Setiawan (born 1980), Indonesian badminton player
- Denny Shute (1904–1974), American professional golfer
- Denny Siegel, American actress, comedian and writer
- Denny Smith (born 1938), American businessman and politician
- Denny Solomona (born 1993), New Zealand rugby league player
- Denny Somach, American businessman, author and radio producer
- Denny Sothern (1904–1977), American baseball player
- Denny Stark (born 1974), American baseball player
- Denny Stolz (1933–2023), American football coach
- Denny Sullivan (1882–1956), American baseball player
- Denny Sullivan (third baseman) (1858–1925), American baseball player
- Denny Sumargo (born 1981), Indonesian former basketball player
- Denny Sumpter, American lawyer
- Denny Tamaki (born 1959), Japanese politician
- Denny Termer (1925–2011), English pianist and accompanist
- Denny Thorley, American video game designer
- Denny Tsettos, American musician
- Denny Urban (born 1988), American ice hockey player
- Denny Vaninger (born 1952), American soccer player
- Denny Vargas (born 1990), Dominican footballer
- Denny Veitch (1931–2011), Canadian rugby union player
- Denny Vitty, Northern Irish unionist politician
- Denny Vrandečić (born 1978), Croatian computer scientist
- Denny Walley (born 1943), American guitarist
- Denny Walling (born 1954), American baseball player
- Denny Walsh (1935–2024), American journalist
- Denny Wang (born 1998), Italian professional footballer
- Denny Weston Jr., American drummer
- Denny White, American politician
- Denny Williams (1896–1929), American baseball player
- Denny Willis (1920–1995), Scottish comedian
- Denny Wright (1924–1992), English jazz guitarist
- Denny Zeitlin (born 1938), American pianist
- Denny Zimmerman (born 1940), American racing driver

=== Dennie ===
- Dennie Christian (born 1956), German singer
- Dennie L. Farr (1861–1909), American businessman and politician
- Dennie Gordon (born 1953), American film and television director
- Dennie Hoggard (1897–1968), American pastor and politician
- Dennie Moore (1902–1978), American film and stage actress
- Dennie Olde Kalter (born 1991), Dutch darts player
- Dennie Oxley (born 1970), American politician

== Fictional characters ==
- Denny Crane, in the American TV series Boston Legal
- Denny Duquette, in the American TV series Grey's Anatomy
- Dennis “Denny” Rickman Jr, in the British soap opera EastEnders
- Denny, in the film The Room
- Mr. Denny, in Pride and Prejudice.

== Other uses ==
- Denny (hybrid hominin), name given to a fossil of an archaic human

== See also ==
- Denie Pentecost (born 1970), Australian film director and former international soccer player
- Deioneus: Deon, Deion, Deone, Dion, Dione, Dionne
- Dionysius: Dionis, Dionisi, Dionisia, Dionisie, Dionisi, Dionisije, Dionisio, Dionisius/Dionisiy, Dionys, Dionysio, Dionysios, Dionysious
  - Denice (disambiguation, given name), Denis (given name, surname), Denisa, Denise (disambiguation, given name), Deniska, Denni, Dennis, Dennise, Deniss, Denisse, Denny (given name, surname), Dennys, Denys, Denyse
