= Denny (surname) =

Denny or Dennie is a surname. Notable people with the surname include:

== People ==
=== Denny ===
- Denny baronets, three titles, including lists of titleholders
- Anthony Denny, advisor to Henry VIII of England
- Arthur A. Denny of the Denny Party, Seattle-area settler
- Bill Denny (William Joseph Denny, 1872–1946), South Australian politician
- Bob Denny, American robotic telescopes software developer
- Charles R. Denny, American lawyer, government official, and executive
- Collins Denny (1854–1943), American bishop of the Methodist Episcopal Church, South
- Collins Denny Jr. (1899–1964), American pro-segregationist lawyer.
- David Denny, Seattle founder
- Ebenezer Denny, American mayor
- Gideon Jacques Denny (1830–1886), American marine artist
- Harmar Denny, US Congressman
- Harmar D. Denny Jr., US Congressman
- Harold Denny, American war correspondent
- Jack Denny (1895–1950), American dancer
- James C. Denny, American politician
- Jay Denny, American soccer player
- Jerry Denny (1859–1927), American baseball player
- Joanna Denny (died 2006), British historian
- John Denny, American baseball player
- John Denny (politician) (1793–1875), American politician
- Mark Denny, American biologist
- Martin Denny (1911–2005), American musician
- Peter Denny (1821–1895), Scottish shipbuilder and shipowner
- Rev. Peter Denny (1917–2009), English railway modeller
- Raymond Denny (born 1963), American cricketer
- Reginald Leigh Denny (1891–1967), British-born actor
- Reginald Oliver Denny, American attacked on live television
- Robyn Denny (1930–2014), British artist
- Ross Denny (born 1955), British diplomat and ambassador
- Sandy Denny, British singer and songwriter
- Simon Denny, New Zealand artist
- Simone Denny, Canadian singer
- T. A. Denny, Irish businessman
- Thomas Denny, English artist and glassmaker
- Tyler Denny (born 1991), English professional boxer
- Wally Denny, Deputy Chief Scout of the Boy Scouts of Canada
- William Denny (disambiguation) several persons, including:

- William Denny (MP) (1578–1625), English lawyer and politician
- William Denny Jr. (born 1930), American politician in the Mississippi House of Representatives
- William Denny and Brothers, British shipbuilder based in Dumbarton, Scotland
- William F. Denny (c. 1860–1908), American vaudeville performer and pioneer recording artist
- William H. P. Denny (1811–1890), American journalist and politician in Ohio

=== Dennie ===
- Alphonso Dennie (1928–2020), Vincentian educator
- Charles Clayton Dennie (1883–1971), American dermatologist
- Frank Dennie (1885–1952), American football player, coach, and administrator
- Joseph Dennie (1768–1812), American author and journalist
- Tom Dennie (1922–2009), Canadian cross-country skier

== See also ==
- Denny (disambiguation)
- Denney (disambiguation)
- Denning (disambiguation)
- Deioneus: Deon, Deion, Deone, Dion, Dione, Dionne
- Dionysius: Dionis, Dionisi, Dionisia, Dionisie, Dionisi, Dionisije, Dionisio, Dionisius/Dionisiy, Dionys, Dionysio, Dionysios, Dionysious
  - Denice (disambiguation, given name), Denis (given name, surname), Denisa, Denise (disambiguation, given name), Deniska, Denni, Dennis, Dennise, Deniss, Denisse, Denny (given name, surname), Dennys, Denys, Denyse
