= Denys =

Denys (Ukrainian: Денис) is both a form of the given name Denis and a patronymic surname. Among others, it is a transliteration of the common Ukrainian name Денис. Notable people with the name include:

== Given name ==
=== Actors, artists, musicians, and writers ===
- Denijs van Alsloot (c.1570–c.1626), Flemish landscape and genre painter
- Denys Arcand (born 1941), Canadian film director, screenwriter and producer
- Denys Baptiste (born 1969), English jazz musician
- Denys Blakeway, British television producer
- Denys Bouliane (born 1955), Canadian composer and conductor
- Denys Burrows, Australian actor and writer
- Denys Cazet (1938–2020), French-American author
- Denys Chabot (1945–2025), Canadian writer and journalist
- Denys Clerval (1934–2016), French cinematographer
- Denys Cochin (1851–1922), French writer
- Denys Colomb de Daunant (1922–2006), French writer, poet, photographer and filmmaker,
- Denys Coop (1920–1981), British cinematographer
- Denys Corbet (1826–1909), Channel Islands poet and painter
- Denys Corley Smith (1922–1989), British author and journalist
- Denys Cowan (born 1961), African American comic book artist and television producer
- Denys Davydov (born 1987), Ukrainian citizen journalist
- Denys Desjardins (born 1966), Canadian film director, screenwriter, cinematographer and teacher
- Denys Granier-Deferre (born 1949), French film director
- Denys Graham (1926–2024), Welsh actor
- Denys Hawthorne (1932–2009), Northern Irish actor
- Denys Irving (1944–1976), Welsh musician and filmmaker
- Denys Kushnarov, Ukrainian filmmaker, journalist and actor
- Denys de La Patellière (1921–2013), French film director and scriptwriter
- Denys Lasdun (1914–2001), English architect
- Denys Ovenden (1922–2019), British illustrator and watercolourist
- Denys Pouncey (1906–1999), English cathedral organist
- Denys Puech (1854–1942), French sculptor
- Denys Rhodes (1919–1981), English novelist
- Denis de Sallo (1626–1669), French writer and lawyer
- Denys Samson (born 1989), Ukrainian dancer and choreographer
- Denys Sichynsky (1865–1909), Ukrainian composer and conductor
- Denys Spittle (1920–2003), British architect
- Denys Val Baker (1917–1984), Cornish writer
- Denys Wortman (1887–1958), American painter, cartoonist and comic strip creator

=== Sportspeople ===
- Denys Aleksandrov (born 1992), Ukrainian footballer
- Denys Andriyenko (born 1980), Ukrainian footballer
- Denys Anelikov (born 1982), Soviet footballer
- Denys Antyukh (born 1997), Ukrainian footballer
- Denys Arendaruk (born 1996), Ukrainian footballer
- Denys Babliuk (born 2001), Ukrainian sport shooter
- Dénys Bain (born 1993), French footballer
- Denys Balan (born 1993), Ukrainian footballer
- Denys Balanyuk (born 1997), Ukrainian footballer
- Denys Barvinko (1994–2021), Ukrainian footballer
- Denys Berinchyk (born 1985), Ukrainian boxer
- Denys Bezborodko (born 1994), Ukrainian footballer
- Denys Bobrov (born 1982), Ukrainian footballer
- Denys Boyko (born 1988), Ukrainian footballer
- Denys Bunchukov (born 2003), Ukrainian footballer
- Denys Byelousov (born 1996), Ukrainian football striker
- Denys Carnill (1926–2016), British field hockey player
- Denys Chamay (1941–2013), Swiss fencer
- Denys Chernysh (born 1999), Ukrainian footballer
- Denys Dedechko (born 1987), Ukrainian footballer
- Denys Demyanenko (born 2000), Ukrainian footballer
- Denys Denysenko (born 1996), Ukrainian beach volleyball player
- Denys Dobson (1880–1916), English rugby player
- Denys Dubrov (born 1989), Ukrainian swimmer
- Denys Favorov (born 1991), Ukrainian footballer
- Denys Filimonov (born 1971), Ukrainian footballer
- Denys Fomin (born 1986), Ukrainian volleyball player
- Denys Golaydo (born 1984), Ukrainian footballer
- Denys Halata (born 2000), Ukrainian footballer
- Denys Halenkov (born 1995), Ukrainian footballer
- Denys Harmash (born 1990), Ukrainian footballer
- Denys Hill (1896–1971), English cricketer
- Denys Hobson (1951–2025), South African cricketer
- Denys Hobson (cricketer, born 1983)
- Denys Holaydo (born 1984), Ukrainian-born Russian footballer
- Denys Hotfrid (born 1975), Ukrainian weightlifter
- Denys Jones (1930–2003), Welsh footballer
- Denys Kamerylov (born 1989), Ukrainian sprint canoer
- Denys Kesil (born 2000), Ukrainian swimmer
- Denys Khomutov (born 1979), Ukrainian association football player
- Denys Kolchin (born 1977), Ukrainian footballer
- Denys Kostyshyn (born 1997), Ukrainian footballer
- Denys Kostyuk (born 1982), Ukrainian road bicycle racer
- Denys Kovalenko (born 1991), Ukrainian sprint canoer
- Denys Kozhanov (born 1987), Ukrainian footballer
- Denys Kulakov (born 1986), Ukrainian footballer
- Denys Kushnirov (born 1992), Ukrainian sport shooter
- Denys Kuzyk (born 2002), Ukrainian footballer
- Denys Lukashov (born 1989), Ukrainian basketball player
- Denys Maasdorp (born 1963), South African tennis player
- Denys Miroshnichenko (born 1994), Ukrainian footballer
- Denys Molchanov (born 1987), Ukrainian tennis player
- Denys Morkel (1906–1980), South African cricketer
- Denys Nahnoynyi (born 2002), Ukrainian footballer
- Denys Ndukve (born 2000), Ukrainian footballer
- Denys Nechyporenko (born 1990), Ukrainian hurdler
- Denys Norenkov (born 1996), Ukrainian footballer
- Denys Oliynyk (born 1987), Ukrainian footballer
- Denys Onyshchenko (born 1978), Ukrainian footballer
- Denys Ostapchenko (born 2001), Ukrainian para swimmer
- Denys Ostrovskyi (born 1998), Ukrainian footballer
- Denys Ovsyannikov (born 1984), Ukrainian futsal player
- Denys Pavlyuk (born 1992), Ukrainian modern pentathlete
- Denys Pidhurskyi (born 2003), Ukrainian footballer
- Denys Pidruchnyi (born 2001), Ukrainian footballer
- Denys Popov (born 1999), Ukrainian footballer
- Denys Poyatsyka (born 1985), Ukrainian boxer
- Denys Prychynenko (born 1992), Ukrainian footballer
- Denys Rebryk (born 1985), Ukrainian footballer
- Denys Rezepov (born 2002), Ukrainian footballer
- Denys Ryabyi (born 2001), Ukrainian footballer
- Denys Rylskyi (born 1989), Ukrainian footballer
- Denys Sahaliuk (born 2002), Ukrainian freestyle wrestler
- Denys Shcherbakov (born 1988), Ukrainian orienteering competitor
- Denys Shelikhov (born 1989), Ukrainian football goalkeeper
- Denys Shevchenko (born 2003), Ukrainian footballer
- Denys Shostak (born 2003), Ukrainian footballer
- Denys Shvydenko (born 2002), Ukrainian footballer
- Denys Skepskyi (born 1987), Ukrainian footballer
- Denys Slyusar (born 2002), Ukrainian footballer
- Denys Smirnov (born 1975), Ukrainian footballer
- Denys Smith (1924–2016), British racehorse trainer
- Denys Sokolovskyi (born 1979), Ukrainian footballer
- Denys Solonenko (born 1992), Ukrainian boxer
- Denys Soroka (born 2001), Ukrainian footballer
- Denys Starchenko (born 1994), Ukrainian footballer
- Denys Stoyan (born 1981), Ukrainian footballer
- Denys Strekalin (born 1999), Ukrainian-French pair skater
- Denys Svityukha (born 2002), Ukrainian footballer
- Denys Sydorenko (born 1989), Ukrainian football goalkeeper
- Denys Sylantyev (born 1976), Ukrainian swimmer and politician
- Denys Sytnik (born 1986), Ukrainian footballer
- Denys Syzonenko (born 1984), Ukrainian swimmer
- Denys Taraduda (born 2000), Ukrainian footballer
- Denys Teslyuk (born 2003), Ukrainian footballer
- Denys Tourtchenkov (born 1978), Russian sprint canoer
- Denys Ustymenko (born 1999), Ukrainian footballer
- Denys Vasilyev (born 1987), Ukrainian footballer
- Denys Vasin (born 1989), Ukrainian footballer
- Denys Volk-Karachevskyi (born 1979), Ukrainian footballer
- Denys Wilcox (1910–1953), English cricketer and schoolmaster
- Denys Woods (1920–1972), South African cricketer
- Denys Yanchuk (born 1988), Ukrainian footballer
- Denys Yurchenko (born 1978), Ukrainian pole vaulter
- Denys Zavhorodnyy (born 1979), Ukrainian swimmer

=== Other ===
- Denys Bray (1875–1951), British colonial civil servant
- Denys Buckley (1906–1998), English barrister and judge
- Denys Bullard (1912–1994), British politician
- Denys Chernyshov (born 1974), Ukrainian politician and economist
- Denys Corbett Wilson (1882–1915), Irish pioneer aviator
- Denys Finch Hatton (1887–1931), English big-game hunter and lover of Karen Blixen
- Denys Fisher (1918–2002), English engineer and board game designer
- Denys Gaith (1910–1986), Syrian Melkite Greek Catholic bishop
- Denys Gillam (1915–1991), British flying ace
- Denys Hay (1915–1994), Scottish historian
- D. E. L. Haynes (1913–1994), English classical scholar
- Denys Henderson (1932–2016), Scottish solicitor
- Denys Herman (born 1981), Ukrainian politician
- Denys Janot (fl. 1529–1544), French printer and bookseller
- Denys Johnson-Davies (1922–2017), Canadian Arabic-to-English translator
- Denys Kireyev (1977–2022), Ukrainian banker and intelligence officer
- Denys Kostrzhevskyi (born 1968), Ukrainian businessman
- Denys Lasdun (1914–2001), English architect
- Denys van Leeuwen (1402–1471), Flemish theologian and mystic
- Denys Lombard (1938–1998), French historian and Sinologist
- Denys Lowson (1906–1975), British barrister and financier
- Denys Maliuska (born 1981), Ukrainian lawyer, businessman and politician
- Denys R. Martin (1892–1970), British philatelist
- Denys Maslov (born 1983), Ukrainian politician
- Denys Monastyrsky (1980–2023), Ukrainian lawyer and politician
- Denys Page (1908–1978), British classical scholar
- Denys Panasyuk (1900–1984), Ukrainian Soviet lawyer and politician
- Denys Campion Potts (1923–2016), English academic whose subject was French literature
- Denys Pringle (born 1951), British archaeologist and medievalist
- Denys Prokopenko (born 1991), Ukrainian military officer
- Denys Rayner (1908–1967), British Royal Navy officer
- Denys Roberts (1921–2013), British Colonial Secretary of Hong Kong
- Denys Rolle, multiple people
- Denys Shleha (born 1982), Ukrainian serviceman
- Denys Shmyhal (born 1975), Prime Minister of Ukraine
- Denys Shortt, British businessman
- Denys Skoryi (born 1979), Ukrainian surgeon, oncologist, professor and politician
- Denys Sutton (1917–1991), British art critic and historian
- Denys Turner (born 1942), British academic
- Denys Uliutin (born 1982), Ukrainian politician
- Denys Vasyliuk (1993–2024), Ukrainian fighter pilot
- Denys Watkins-Pitchford (1905–1990), British author, illustrator and countryman
- Denys Whitehorn Reid (1897–1970), officer in the British Army
- Denys Wilkinson (1922–2016), British nuclear physicist
- Denys Williams (1929–2014), Chief Justice of Barbados
- Denys Winstanley (1877-1947), British educator
- Denys Witherington (1921–1944), English cricketer and British Army soldier
- Denys Zacharopoulos (born 1952), Greek art historian and theorist

== Surname ==
- André Denys (1948–2013), Belgian politician
- Ewout Denys (born 1987), Belgian footballer
- Frans Denys (c. 1610–1670), Flemish Baroque painter
- Jacob Denys (1644–1708), Flemish Baroque painter
- Jean-Baptiste Denys (c. 1640–1704), French physician
- Nicolas Denys (c. 1598–1688), French explorer, colonizer, soldier and leader
- Peter Denys (1760-1816), British landowner
- Pierre Denys, French physician, discovered Denys-Drash syndrome
- Pierre Denys de Montfort (1766–1820), French naturalist
- Simon-Pierre Denys de Bonaventure (1659–1711), French Governor of Acadia
- Thomas Denys (c.1477–1561), Sheriff and MP for Devon

== See also ==
- Deioneus: Deon, Deion, Deone, Dion, Dione, Dionne
- Dionysius: Dionis, Dionisi, Dionisia, Dionisie, Dionisi, Dionisije, Dionisio, Dionisius/Dionisiy, Dionys, Dionysio, Dionysios, Dionysious
  - Denice (disambiguation, given name), Denis (given name, surname), Denisa, Denise (disambiguation, given name), Deniska, Denni, Dennis, Dennise, Deniss, Denisse, Denny (given name, surname), Dennys, Denys, Denyse
- De Nijs (surname)
- Denys-Drash
- St Denys
