= Denis (surname) =

Denis is a French surname. Notable people with the surname include:

- Denis (harpsichord makers) an influential family of Parisian harpsichord makers in the 16th and 17th centuries
- Armand Denis (1896–1971), Belgian-born wildlife film-maker
- Azellus Denis (1907–1991), Canadian politician
- Claire Denis (born 1946), French film director
- Francisco Denis, Venezuelan actor and director
- Germán Denis (born 1981), Argentine footballer
- Harry Dénis (1896–1971), Dutch football player
- Jean Denis (1902–1992), Belgian politician and writer
- Jonathan Denis (born 1976), Canadian politician
- Joseph Denis (1657–1736), Canadian priest
- Lara Denis (born 1969), American philosopher
- Léon Denis (1846–1927), French spiritist and philosopher
- Lukas Denis (born 1997), American football player
- Marc Denis (born 1977), Canadian former ice hockey player
- Marilyn Denis (born 1958), Canadian broadcaster
- Maurice Denis (1870–1943), French painter
- Michael Denis (1729–1800), Austrian poet and entomologist
- Michaela Denis (1914–2003), wildlife documentary film-maker and presenter
- Mo Denis (born 1961), American politician
- Neil Denis (born 1987), Canadian actor
- Óscar Denis (born 1946), Paraguayan politician, Vice President (2012–2013)
- Sir Peter Denis, 1st Baronet (1713–1778), English officer and Member of Parliament
- Sergio Denis (born 1949), Argentine singer
- Willey Glover Denis (1879–1929), American biochemist and physiologist

== See also ==
- Deioneus: Deon, Deion, Deone, Dion, Dione, Dionne
- Dionysius: Dionis, Dionisi, Dionisia, Dionisie, Dionisi, Dionisije, Dionisio, Dionisius/Dionisiy, Dionys, Dionysio, Dionysios, Dionysious
  - Denice (disambiguation, given name), Denis, Denisa, Denise, Deniska, Denni, Dennis, Dennise, Deniss, Denisse, Denny (given name, surname), Dennys, Denys, Denyse
