= Denyse =

- Pronunciation: /dəˈniːs/ də-NEES
- Gender: Female

Origin
- Origin: Greek / Roman mythology
- Meaning: to be devoted to Bacchus

Other names
- Related names: Denise, Dennis

Denyse is a feminine given name, and may be seen as a variant of Denise. Notable people with the name include:

- Denyse Alexander (born 1931), British actress
- Denyse Baillargeon (born 1954), Canadian historian
- Denyse Beaulieu, Canadian writer
- Denyse Benoit, Canadian actress, director and screenwriter
- Denyse Clairouin (1900–1945), French translator
- Denyse Floreano (born 1976), Venezuelan beauty pageant winner
- Denyse Gadbois (1921–2013), Canadian artist
- Denyse Julien (born 1960), Canadian badminton player
- Denyse O'Leary (born 1950), Canadian author
- Denyse Plummer (1953–2023), Trinidadian calypsonian and gospel singer
- Denyse Wang Stoneback, American politician
- Denyse Thomasos (1964–2012), Trinidadian-Canadian painter
- Denyse Tontz (born 1994), American singer-songwriter, dancer and actress
- Denyse Woods (born 1958), Irish writer

== See also ==
- Deioneus: Deon, Deion, Deone, Dion, Dione, Dionne
- Dionysius: Dionis, Dionisi, Dionisia, Dionisie, Dionisi, Dionisije, Dionisio, Dionisius/Dionisiy, Dionys, Dionysio, Dionysios, Dionysious
  - Denice (disambiguation, given name), Denis (given name, surname), Denisa, Denise (disambiguation, given name), Deniska, Denni, Dennis, Dennise, Deniss, Denisse, Denny (given name, surname), Dennys, Denys, Denyse
