= Denice (given name) =

Denice as a feminine given name. Notable people with the name include:

- Denice Andrée (fl. 2011–2015), Swedish model
- Denice Denton (1959–2006), American administrator
- Denice Duff (born 1965), American actress, director, and photographer
- Denice Frohman (fl. 2013–2016), American poet, writer, performer and educator
- Denice D. Lewis (born 1960), American fashion model, actor, abstract artist, photographer, philanthropist and socialite
- Denice Klarskov (born 1986), Danish pornographic actress and entrepreneur

== See also ==
- Denice (disambiguation)
- Deniece Williams
- Deioneus: Deon, Deion, Deone, Dion, Dione, Dionne
- Dionysius: Dionis, Dionisi, Dionisia, Dionisie, Dionisi, Dionisije, Dionisio, Dionisius/Dionisiy, Dionys, Dionysio, Dionysios, Dionysious
  - Denice (disambiguation, given name), Denis (given name, surname), Denisa, Denise (disambiguation, given name), Deniska, Denni, Dennis, Dennise, Deniss, Denisse, Denny (given name, surname), Dennys, Denys, Denyse
