= Dionisio =

Dionisio is a name, a variant of Dionysius. Notable people with the name include:

== Given name ==
- Dionisio Lazzari (1617–1689), Italian sculptor and architect
- Dionisio Aguado y García (1784–1849), Spanish classical guitarist and composer
- Papa Isio (1846–1911), Dionisio Magbuelas, Filipino leader of babaylanes
- Dionisio Anzilotti (1867–1950), Italian jurist and judge
- Dionisio Jakosalem (1878–1931), Filipino governor
- Dionisio Carreras (1890–1949), Spanish long-distance runner
- Dionisio Fernández (boxer) (1907–?), Spanish boxer
- Dionisio Mejía (1907–1963), Mexican football forward
- Dionisio Fernández (sport shooter) (1921–?), Argentine sports shooter
- Dionísio Azevedo (1922–1994), Brazilian actor, director, and writer
- Dionisio Romero (born 1936), Peruvian banker
- Dionisio Quintana (1957–2026), Cuban javelin thrower and trainer
- Dionisio Gutiérrez (born 1959), Guatemalan businessman
- Dionisio D'Aguilar (born 1964), Bahamian politician
- Dionisio Cimarelli (born 1965), Italian sculptor
- Dionísio (footballer, born 1970), Dionísio Domingos Rangel, Brazilian football forward
- Dionisio Cabrera (born 1986), Uruguayan football attacking midfielder
- Díonísio (footballer, born 1988), Díonísio de Oliveira Alves, Brazilian football defensive midfielder
- Dionísio (footballer, born 1994), Dionísio Pereira de Souza Neto, Brazilian football midfielder

== Surname ==
- John Dionisio (born 1948), American executive chairman for AECOM
- Silvia Dionisio (born 1951), Italian actress
- Ernix Dionisio (born 1978), politician, representative of Manila's 1st District
- Joshua Dionisio (born 1994), Filipino actor

== See also ==
- Dionísio, Minas Gerais, municipality in Brazil
- San Dionisio (disambiguation)
- Deioneus: Deon, Deion, Deone, Dion, Dione, Dionne
- Dionysius: Dionis, Dionisi, Dionisia, Dionisie, Dionisi, Dionisije, Dionisio, Dionisius/Dionisiy, Dionys, Dionysio, Dionysios, Dionysious
  - Denice (disambiguation, given name), Denis (given name, surname), Denisa, Denise (disambiguation, given name), Deniska, Denni, Dennis, Dennise, Deniss, Denisse, Denny (given name, surname), Dennys, Denys, Denyse
