= Denisa =

Denisa is a feminine given name, equivalent to English Denise, used in various European languages, particularly in Albanian, Croatian, Czech, Romanian, Slovak and Slovenian. Notable people with the name include:

- Denisa Baránková (2001–2026), Slovak archer
- Denisa Chládková (born 1979), Czech female tennis player
- Denisa Dedu (born 1994), Romanian handball player
- Denisa Dvořáková (born 1989), Czech model
- Denisa Golgotă (born 2002), Romanian artistic gymnast
- Denisa Helceletová (born 1986), Czech athlete
- Denisa Hindová (born 2002), Czech tennis player
- Denisa Křížová (born 1994), Czech ice hockey player
- Denisa Legac, Croatian physician
- Denisa Mailat (born 2002), Romanian rhythmic gymnast
- Denisa Neagu (born 1986), Romanian politician
- Denisa Proto (born 1991), Albanian footballer
- Denisa Rosolová (born 1986), Czech athlete
- Denisa Saková (born 1976), Slovak politician
- Denisa Šátralová (born 1993), Czech tennis player
- Denisa Smolenová (born 1989), Slovak swimmer
- Denisa Sokolovská (born 1971), Czechoslovak rhythmic gymnast
- Denisa Spergerová (born 2000), Czech model and beauty pageant titleholder
- Denisa Tîlvescu (born 1996), Romanian rower
- Denisa Vâlcan (born 2000), Romanian handball player
- Denisa Vyšňovská (born 1994), Slovak model and beauty pageant titleholder
- Denisa Wagner, American scientist
- Jiří Procházka, a Czech martial artist known as Denisa or Deniska

== See also ==
- Deioneus: Deon, Deion, Deone, Dion, Dione, Dionne
- Dionysius: Dionis, Dionisi, Dionisia, Dionisie, Dionisi, Dionisije, Dionisio, Dionisius/Dionisiy, Dionys, Dionysio, Dionysios, Dionysious
  - Denice (disambiguation, given name), Denis (given name, surname), Denisa, Denise (disambiguation, given name), Deniska, Denni, Dennis, Dennise, Deniss, Denisse, Denny (given name, surname), Dennys, Denys, Denyse
