= Deniss =

Deniss is the spelling of the masculine Russian given name Denis according to the Latvian law about names. It is also the Estonian transliteration of the name "Denis". Notable people with the name include:

- Deniss Boroditš (born 1979), Estonian politician
- Deniss Čalovskis (born 1985), Latvian hacker
- Deniss Čerkovskis (born 1978), Latvian modern pentathlete
- Deniss Ivanovs (born 1984), Latvian footballer
- Deniss Kačanovs (born 1979), Latvian footballer
- Deniss Karpak (born 1986), Estonian sailor
- Deniss Kozlovs (born 1983), Latvian judoka
- Deniss Meļņiks (born 2002), Latvian professional footballer
- Deniss Pavlovs (born 1983), Latvian tennis player
- Deniss Rakels (born 1992), Latvian footballer
- Deniss Romanovs (born 1978), Latvian football coach and player
- Deniss Smirnovs (born 1999), Latvian ice hockey player
- Deniss Tjapkin (born 1991), Estonian footballer
- Deniss Vasiļjevs (born 1999), Latvian figure skater

== See also ==
- Deioneus: Deon, Deion, Deone, Dion, Dione, Dionne
- Dionysius: Dionis, Dionisi, Dionisia, Dionisie, Dionisi, Dionisije, Dionisio, Dionisius/Dionisiy, Dionys, Dionysio, Dionysios, Dionysious
  - Denice (disambiguation, given name), Denis (given name, surname), Denisa, Denise (disambiguation, given name), Deniska, Denni, Dennis, Dennise, Deniss, Denisse, Denny (given name, surname), Dennys, Denys, Denyse
