= Dionis =

Dionis is an given name and a surname derived from Dionysus. Notable people with the name include:

== Given name ==
- Dionis Bubani (1926–2006), Albanian writer, playwright, humorist and translator
- Dionis de Lys, Flemish conquistador
- Dionís Renart (1878–1946), Spanish artist
- Dionis Vodnyev (born 1971), German ski jumper

== Surname ==
- Achille Pierre Dionis du Séjour (1734–1794), French astronomer and mathematician
- Jean Dionis du Séjour (born 1956), French politician
- Pierre Dionis, French physician

== Fictional characters ==
- Poor Dionis

== See also ==
- Deioneus: Deon, Deion, Deone, Dion, Dione, Dionne
- Dionysius: Dionis, Dionisi, Dionisia, Dionisie, Dionisi, Dionisije, Dionisio, Dionisius/Dionisiy, Dionys, Dionysio, Dionysios, Dionysious
  - Denice (disambiguation, given name), Denis (given name, surname), Denisa, Denise (disambiguation, given name), Deniska, Denni, Dennis, Dennise, Deniss, Denisse, Denny (given name, surname), Dennys, Denys, Denyse
