= Dionisie =

Dionisie is a given name. Notable people with the name include:

- Dionisie Eclesiarhul (c. 1740–1820), was a Wallachian monk, chronicler, and polemicist
- Dionisie Fotino (1769–1821), Wallachian historian and high ranking civil servant of Greek origin
- Dionisie Ghermani (1922–2009), Romanian professor, writer, philanthropist, and political activist.
- Dionisie de Munchensi (fl. 13th century), second wife of landowner Warin de Munchensi, stepmother to Joan de Munchensi, and addressee of Walter de Bibbesworth's Anglo-Norman language-learning poem The Treatise
- Dionisie Vitcu (born 1937), Romanian actor, writer, and politician, M.P.

== See also ==
- Deioneus: Deon, Deion, Deone, Dion, Dione, Dionne
- Dionysius: Dionis, Dionisi, Dionisia, Dionisie, Dionisi, Dionisije, Dionisio, Dionisius/Dionisiy, Dionys, Dionysio, Dionysios, Dionysious
  - Denice (disambiguation, given name), Denis (given name, surname), Denisa, Denise (disambiguation, given name), Deniska, Denni, Dennis, Dennise, Deniss, Denisse, Denny (given name, surname), Dennys, Denys, Denyse
