= Denis =

Denis may refer to:

- Denis (given name)
- Denis (surname)

== Other uses ==
- Denis Island, island in the Indian Ocean, part of the Seychelles
- Denis & Denis, Yugoslav synth-pop group
- Denis and Me, Canadian animated television series
- "Denis" (song), a song by Blondie
- Denis (album), a 1996 album by Blondie
- DENIS: Deep Near Infrared Survey of the Southern Sky, an astronomical survey

== See also ==
- Deioneus: Deon, Deion, Deone, Dion, Dione, Dionne
- Dionysius: Dionis, Dionisi, Dionisia, Dionisie, Dionisi, Dionisije, Dionisio, Dionisius/Dionisiy, Dionys, Dionysio, Dionysios, Dionysious
  - Denice (disambiguation, given name), Denis (given name, surname), Denisa, Denise (disambiguation, given name), Deniska, Denni, Dennis, Dennise, Deniss, Denisse, Denny (given name, surname), Dennys, Denys, Denyse
- Jean-Denis
- Saint Denis (disambiguation)
- Battle of Saint-Denis (disambiguation), several battles
- Denis's Ear, a cave in Italy
