= Dennys =

Dennys may refer to:

- Joyce Dennys (1893–1991), English cartoonist, illustrator and painter
- Rodney Dennys (1911–1993), British foreign service operative
- Dennys Bornhöft (born 1986), German politician
- Dennys Quiñónez (born 1992), Ecuadorian footballer
- Dennys Reyes (born 1977), Mexican baseball pitcher with the St. Louis Cardinals

== See also ==
- Deioneus: Deon, Deion, Deone, Dion, Dione, Dionne
- Dionysius: Dionis, Dionisi, Dionisia, Dionisie, Dionisi, Dionisije, Dionisio, Dionisius/Dionisiy, Dionys, Dionysio, Dionysios, Dionysious
  - Denice (disambiguation, given name), Denis (given name, surname), Denisa, Denise (disambiguation, given name), Deniska, Denni, Dennis, Dennise, Deniss, Denisse, Denny (given name, surname), Dennys, Denys, Denyse
- Denny's, a large family diner-style restaurant chain in the United States and Canada
