= Dionys =

Dionys is a given name. Notable people with the name include:

- Dionys Baeriswyl (1944–2023), Swiss theoretical physicist
- Dionys Burger (1892–1987), Dutch secondary school physics teacher and author
- Dionys César (born 1976), Dominican baseball player and coach
- Dionys Fitzherbert (c. 1580–1640), English writer
- Dionys Mascolo (1916–1997), French literary editor
- Dionys Pruckner (1834–1896), German pianist and music teacher
- Dionys Schönecker (1888–1938), Austrian football player and coach
- Dionys Széchényi (1866–1934), Austro-Hungarian soldier and diplomat.
- Dionys Thalmann (fl. 1980s), (born 1953). Swiss sprint canoeist
- Dionys van Dongen (1748–1819), Dutch painter
- Dionys van Nijmegen (1705–1798), Dutch painter
- Dionys Verburg (1655–1722), Dutch Golden Age landscape painter
- Friedrich Dionys Weber (1766–1842), Germanized form of Bedřich Diviš Weber, Bohemian composer and musicologist

== See also ==
- Deioneus: Deon, Deion, Deone, Dion, Dione, Dionne
- Dionysius: Dionis, Dionisi, Dionisia, Dionisie, Dionisi, Dionisije, Dionisio, Dionisius/Dionisiy, Dionys, Dionysio, Dionysios, Dionysious
  - Denice (disambiguation, given name), Denis (given name, surname), Denisa, Denise (disambiguation, given name), Deniska, Denni, Dennis, Dennise, Deniss, Denisse, Denny (given name, surname), Dennys, Denys, Denyse
