= Deniska =

Deniska is a given name. It may refer to:

- A diminutive of the female given name Denisa used in Czech and Slovak
- A diminutive of the male given name Denis used in Russia
- Jiří Procházka, a Czech martial artist known as Deniska or Denisa

== See also ==
- Deioneus: Deon, Deion, Deone, Dion, Dione, Dionne
- Dionysius: Dionis, Dionisi, Dionisia, Dionisie, Dionisi, Dionisije, Dionisio, Dionisius/Dionisiy, Dionys, Dionysio, Dionysios, Dionysious
  - Denice (disambiguation, given name), Denis (given name, surname), Denisa, Denise, Deniska, Denni, Dennis, Dennise, Deniss, Denisse, Denny (given name, surname), Dennys, Denys, Denyse
