= Dionysio =

Dionysio is a given name. Notable people with the name include:

- Dionysio Miseroni (1607–1661), Bohemian jeweler, gemcutter, and glass cutter
- Dionysio Typaldos (1875–1955), Greek physician and diplomat

== See also ==
- Deioneus: Deon, Deion, Deone, Dion, Dione, Dionne
- Dionysius: Dionis, Dionisi, Dionisia, Dionisie, Dionisi, Dionisije, Dionisio, Dionisius/Dionisiy, Dionys, Dionysio, Dionysios, Dionysious
  - Denice (disambiguation, given name), Denis (given name, surname), Denisa, Denise (disambiguation, given name), Deniska, Denni, Dennis, Dennise, Deniss, Denisse, Denny (given name, surname), Dennys, Denys, Denyse
