= Denisse =

Denisse is a feminine given name. Notable people with the name include:

- Denisse Ahumada (born 1993), Chilean cyclist
- Denisse Dibós (born 1967), Peruvian actress
- Denisse Fajardo (born 1964), Peruvian volleyball player
- Denisse Franco (born 1998), Mexican model
- Denisse Fuenmayor (born 1979), Venezuelan softball player
- Denisse Guerrero (born 1980), Mexican musician and singer-songwriter
- Denisse López (born 1976), Mexican gymnast
- Denisse Malebrán (born 1976), Chilean singer, songwriter and vocalist
- Denisse Miralles (born 1976), Peruvian engineer, economist and politician
- Denisse Oller (born 1955), American television journalist
- Denisse Orellana (born 1996), Chilean footballer
- Denisse Peña (born 1999), Spanish actress
- Denisse Robles (born 1987), Ecuadorian economist and politician
- Denisse Soltero (born 1989), Puerto Rican footballer
- Denisse van Lamoen (born 1979), Chilean archer

== See also ==
- Deioneus: Deon, Deion, Deone, Dion, Dione, Dionne
- Dionysius: Dionis, Dionisi, Dionisia, Dionisie, Dionisi, Dionisije, Dionisio, Dionisius/Dionisiy, Dionys, Dionysio, Dionysios, Dionysious
  - Denice (disambiguation, given name), Denis (given name, surname), Denisa, Denise (disambiguation, given name), Deniska, Denni, Dennis, Dennise, Deniss, Denisse, Denny (given name, surname), Dennys, Denys, Denyse
