= Dennise =

Dennise is a given name. Notable people with the name include:

- Dennise Hutton (born 1960), Australian golfer
- Dennise Michelle (born 1992), Filipina volleyball player
- Dennise Longo Quiñones (fl. from 1993), Secretary of Justice of Puerto Rico
- Andrea Dennise Aldana Bennett (born 1989), Guatemalan sports sailor
- Gail Dennise Thomas Mathieu (born 1951), American Diplomat

== See also ==
- Deioneus: Deon, Deion, Deone, Dion, Dione, Dionne
- Dionysius: Dionis, Dionisi, Dionisia, Dionisie, Dionisi, Dionisije, Dionisio, Dionisius/Dionisiy, Dionys, Dionysio, Dionysios, Dionysious
  - Denice (disambiguation, given name), Denis (given name, surname), Denisa, Denise (disambiguation, given name), Deniska, Denni, Dennis, Dennise, Deniss, Denisse, Denny (given name, surname), Dennys, Denys, Denyse
