= Dionisije =

Dionisije is a given name. Notable people with the name include:

- Dionisije Njaradi (1874–1940), Yugoslavian Greek Catholic hierarch of Rusyn origin
- Dionisije Novaković (c. 1705–1767), Serbian Orthodox bishop
- Dionisije Milivojević (1898–1979), Serbian Orthodox bishop
- Dionisije II, Metropolitan of Belgrade (fl. 1813–1815), Metropolitan of Belgrade

== See also ==
- Deioneus: Deon, Deion, Deone, Dion, Dione, Dionne
- Dionysius: Dionis, Dionisi, Dionisia, Dionisie, Dionisi, Dionisije, Dionisio, Dionisius/Dionisiy, Dionys, Dionysio, Dionysios, Dionysious
  - Denice (disambiguation, given name), Denis (given name, surname), Denisa, Denise (disambiguation, given name), Deniska, Denni, Dennis, Dennise, Deniss, Denisse, Denny (given name, surname), Dennys, Denys, Denyse
