= Dionysious =

Dionysious may refer to:

- Pulikkottil Joseph Mar Dionysious II, Metropolitan in the Malankara church
- Pulikkottil Joseph Mar Dionysious I (Mar Thoma X), Metropolitan in the Malankara church
- Punnathara Mar Dionysious (Mar Thoma XI), Malankara Metropolitan from 1817 to 1825

== See also ==
- Dionysius (disambiguation)
- Dionysos (disambiguation)
- Deioneus: Deon, Deion, Deone, Dion, Dione, Dionne
- Dionysius: Dionis, Dionisi, Dionisia, Dionisie, Dionisi, Dionisije, Dionisio, Dionisius/Dionisiy, Dionys, Dionysio, Dionysios, Dionysious
  - Denice: (disambiguation, given name), Denis, Denisa, Denise, Deniska, Denni, Dennis, Dennise, Deniss, Denisse, Denny, Dennys, Denys, Denyse
