= Dionysius of Syracuse =

Dionysius of Syracuse may refer to:

- Dionysius I of Syracuse, tyrant of Syracuse from 405 BC to 367 BC.; father of Dionysius II
- Dionysius II of Syracuse, tyrant of Syracuse from 367 BC to 357 BC and again from 346 BC to 344 BC.; son of Dionysius I

== See also ==
- List of tyrants of Syracuse
- Dionysius (disambiguation)
- Syracuse (disambiguation)
