= Dionisia (name) =

Dionisia is a given name. Notable people with the name include:

- Dionisia Amaya (1933–2014), Honduran teacher and Garifuna community activist.
- Dionisia Mijoba (c. 1938-2017), Venezuelan politician
- Dionísia Pio (born 1977), Angolan handball player.
- Dionisia Talangpaz (1691–1732), Filipino Roman Catholic nun.

== See also ==
- Saint Denise (disambiguation)
- Dionisia, genus of parasitic alveolates belonging to the phylum Apicomplexa.
- Deioneus: Deon, Deion, Deone, Dion, Dione, Dionne
- Dionisius: Dionis, Dionisi, Dionisia, Dionisie, Dionisi, Dionisije, Dionisio, Dionisiy, Dionys, Dionisiy, Dionysio, Dionysios, Dionysious, Dionysius
  - Denis, Denisa, Denise, Deniska, Denni, Dennis, Dennise, Deniss, Denisse, Denny, Dennys, Denys
