= William Denny =

William Denny may refer to:

- William Denny (MP) (1578–1625), English lawyer and politician
- William Denny, deputy governor of the Province of Pennsylvania, 1756–1759
- William Denny Jr. (born 1930), American politician in the Mississippi House of Representatives
- William Denny and Brothers, British shipbuilder based in Dumbarton, Scotland
- William Alexander Denny or Bill Denny (medical researcher) (born 1943), New Zealand chemist
- William F. Denny (c. 1860–1908), American vaudeville performer and pioneer recording artist
- William H. P. Denny (1811–1890), American newspaper editor and publisher and politician in Ohio
- William Joseph Denny or Bill Denny (1872–1946), South Australian politician
- William Thomas Denny (b. 1945), Australian civil servant, grandson of William Joseph Denny

== See also ==
- William D. Denney (1873–1953), American businessman and politician, Governor of Delaware
