= Denisa Legac =

Dr. Denisa Legac
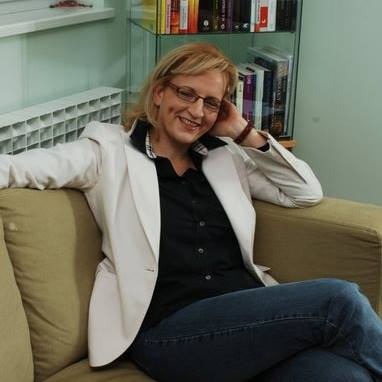
- Profile picture

Denisa Legac was born on 11 November 1975 in Zagreb. She was and educated in Graz and Vienna and is a Medical Doctor, Marriage and Family Counselor, Therapist, Hypnotherapist influenced by Milton Erickson's techniques and Systemic Family Therapist.

She is the founder of the Croatian Society for Medical Hypnosis, an expert association part of the Croatian association of medical doctors and the Milton H. Erickson Institute in Zagreb, Croatia, part of the international Milton H. Erickson Foundation.

Jutarnji list has regularly used her as a source on related medical matters.
