= Denyse Baillargeon =

Canadian historian (born 1954)

- Born: January 15, 1954 (age 72); Verdun, Quebec, Canada
- Education: Université de Montréal
- Occupations: historian, professor
- Years active: 1981-2018

Denyse Baillargeon (French pronunciation: [dəniz bajaʁʒɔ̃]), born in Verdun in 1954, is a Canadian historian and specialist in the social history of women, the family, and health in Québec. She was a professor of history at the Université de Montréal from 1994 to 2018.

== Biography ==
Denyse Baillargeon was born on January 15, 1954, in Verdun, a working-class borough of Montreal that was amalgamated by the city in 2002. She is the sister of Diane Baillargeon, an archivist at the Université de Montréal.

She completed her master's thesis in history at the Universite de Montreal in 1981 on the topic of the United Textile Workers of America (OUTA) and completed her doctoral thesis there on the economic contributions of Montreal housewives to the survival of working-class families during the Great Depression. This would later by published in 1991 by Editions du Remue-Menage under the title "Ménagères au temps de la crise" and an English translation published in 1999 under the title of Making Do. Women, Family and Home in Montreal During the Great Depression. It was one of the first works of contemporary Canadian history to rely solely on oral testimony.

== Career ==
Baillargeon was hired by the Université de Montréal in 1994 and her research focused on the social history of women. She has published on the Sainte-Justine Hospital and infant mortality in Montreal in the early twentieth century and the medicalization of motherhood by institutions of the state and Church.

According to Helene Charron, Baillargeon's work contributed significantly to the legitimization of gender as a lens of social history in Quebec and Canadian historian circles. Her publications and professional contributions garnered her many accolades and awards from her peers, including a Clio Prize from the Canadian Historical Association, the Lionel-Groulx Prize from the Institut d'histoire de l'Amerique francaise and the Jean-Charles-Falardeau Prize from the Canadian Federation for the Humanities and Social Sciences.

In 2012, she published Brève histoire des femmes au Québec, an updated companion work to the previous work of the Clio Collective (made up of Micheline Dumont, Marie Lavigne, Michele Stanton and Jennifer Stoddart), The History of Women in Quebec for Four Centuries. Her 2019 book Repenser La Nation: l'histoire du suffrage feminin au Quebec, (translated by Käthe Roth in the same year as To Be Equals in Our Own Country : Women and the Vote in Quebec), provides a survey of the history of women's suffrage from Lower Canada to the late twentieth century.

In a collaborative project with Josette Brun and Estelle Lebel of Laval University, Baillargeon analyzed the feminist discourse within the television program Femme d'aujourd'hui (1965-1982) broadcast by Radio-Canada, particularly how the show approached salaried work by women.

== Select publications ==
- Baillargeon, Denyse (1991). Ménagères au temps de la crise. Montréal, Québec: Editions du Remue-Ménage. ISBN 2-89091-105-5. OCLC 28291588. and Baillargeon, Denyse (1991). Ménagères au temps de la crise. Montréal, Québec: Editions du Remue-Ménage. ISBN 2-89091-105-5. OCLC 28291588.
  - English translation by Yvonne Klein, Making Do. Women, Family and Home in Montreal During the Great Depression, Waterloo, Wilfrid Laurier University Press, 1999.
- Baillargeon, Denyse (2004). Un Québec en mal d'enfants : la médicalisation de la maternité, 1910-1970. Montréal: Éditions du Remue-ménage. ISBN 2-89091-218-3. OCLC 56319017.
  - English translation by W. Donald Wilson, Babies for the Nation. The Medicalization of Maternity in Quebec, 1910-1970, Waterloo, Wilfrid Laurier University Press, 2009.
- Baillargeon, Denyse. Naître, vivre, grandir. Sainte-Justine, 1907-2007, Montréal, Éditions du Boréal, 2007 (ISBN 978-2-76460-520-2)
- Baillargeon, Denyse (2012). Brève histoire des femmes au Québec. Montréal, Québec. ISBN 978-2-7646-2205-6. OCLC 797278687.
  - Baillargeon, Denyse (2014). A brief history of women in Quebec. Translated by Wilson, W. Donald. Waterloo, Ontario. ISBN 978-1-55458-952-4. OCLC 870916684.
- Baillargeon, Denyse (2019). Repenser la nation: L'histoire du suffrage féminin au Québec. Montréal. ISBN 978-2-89091-651-7. OCLC 1252972932.
  - Baillargeon, Denyse (2019). To be equals in our own country : women and the vote in Quebec. Translated by Roth, Käthe. Vancouver. ISBN 978-0-7748-3850-4. OCLC 1085540217.

== Awards ==
- 2020. Political Book Prize. L'Assemblé Nationale de Quebec for Repenser la nation: l'histoire du suffrage féminin au Québec.
- 2019. Hilda-Neatby Prize with Josette Brun and Estelle Lebel for article "xxx" Feminist Research
- 2005-2006. Jean-Charles-Falardeau Prize. Canadian Federation for the Humanities and Social Sciences. For Un Québec en mal d’enfants: la médicalisation de la maternité, 1910-1970.
- 2005 Clio Prize - Quebec. Canadian Historical Association. For Un Québec en mal d’enfants: la médicalisation de la maternité, 1910-1970.
- 2005. Lionel-Groulx Prize, Institute d'histoire de l'Amérique française. For Un Québec en mal d’enfants: la médicalisation de la maternité, 1910-1970
- 1998. Hilda-Neatby Prize. Canadian Historical Association. For article "Fréquenter les gouttes de lait. L'expérience des mères montréalaises, 1910-1965", Revue d'histoire de l'Amérique française.
- 1997. Guy-Fregault Prize For article "Fréquenter les gouttes de lait. L'expérience des mères montréalaises, 1910-1965", Revue d'histoire de l'Amérique française.
