= Denys Rolle =

Denys Rolle may refer to:

- Denys Rolle (died 1638) of Stevenstone, Devon, Sheriff of Devon
- Denys Rolle (died 1797) of Stevenstone, Devon, MP
