= Dionysios Ikkos =

Dionysios (Denis) Ikkos (1921, Syrrako –1993) was a Greek physician who trained in Endocrinology at Karolinska Hospital, Stockholm with Rolf Luft and co-described the Luft-Ikkos mitochondrial syndrome. He pioneered the Department of Endocrinology and Metabolism in Evangelismos Hospital, Athens, where he distinguished himself in clinical practice, research and teaching, and was a founding member of the Hellenic (Greek) Endocrine Society which honours his contribution with the annual Dionysios Ikkos Memorial Lecture. He was an early advocate and supported the establishment of General Practice/ Family Medicine as a medical specialty in Greece. The Hellenic (Greek) Association of General Practice also honours his contribution with the Dionysios Ikkos prize, the highest prize awarded for a presentation in the association's annual congress. Dionysios Ikkos was married to Danae Ikkou- Papadimitriou, a distinguished Paediatric Cardiologist and pioneer of her specialty in Greece.
