= Dionysius Part =

Roman Catholic prelate

Most Reverend Dionysius Part
- Auxiliary Bishop of Mainz; Titular Bishop of Cyrene
- Church: Catholic Church
- Diocese: Diocese of Mainz
- In office: 1474–1475

Orders
- Consecration: 15 May 1474

Personal details
- Died: 3 November 1475 Mainz, Germany

Dionysius Part, O.P. or Denys Part (died 1475) was a Roman Catholic prelate who served as Auxiliary Bishop of Mainz (1474–1475) in present Germany.

== Biography ==
Part was ordained a priest in the Order of Preachers. In 1474, he was appointed during the papacy of Pope Sixtus IV as Auxiliary Bishop of Mainz and Titular Bishop of Cyrene. On 15 May 1474, he was consecrated bishop. He served as Auxiliary Bishop of Mainz until his death on 3 Nov 1475.

== External links and additional sources ==
- Cheney, David M. "Diocese of Mainz". Catholic-Hierarchy.org. (for Chronology of Bishops) ^{[self-published]}
- Chow, Gabriel. "Diocese of Mainz (Germany)". GCatholic.org. (for Chronology of Bishops) ^{[self-published]}
