= Dione (footballer, born 1979) =

Brazilian footballer (born 1979)

Personal information
- Full name: Dione Francisco dos Santos
- Date of birth: 25 July 1979 (age 47)
- Height: 1.89 m (6 ft 2 1/2 in)
- Position: Defender

Senior career*
Years	Team	Apps	(Gls)
2000	Vila Nova		
2002–2003	Anapolina		
2004	Grêmio Anápolis		
2004–2005	Vitória Setúbal	2	(0)
2007–2008	União Rondonópolis		
2008	Canedense		
2008	Morrinhos		
2008–2009	URT		
2010	Aparecidense		
2010–2011	Araguaína		
2011	Barra do Garças		
- * Club domestic league appearances and goals

Dione Francisco dos Santos (born 25 July 1979) is a former Brazilian football player.

== Club career ==
He made his Primeira Liga debut for Vitória Setúbal on 13 March 2005 in a game against Vitória Guimarães.

== Honours ==
Vitória Setúbal

- Taça de Portugal: 2004–05
