= D'Eon =

D'Eon is a surname. Notable people with the surname include:

- d'Eon (musician), Canadian electronic musician
- Chevalier d'Éon (1728–1810), French diplomat and spy
- Dwight d'Eon, Canadian musician

== See also ==
- Deon
- Dion (disambiguation)
- Eon (disambiguation)
