= Denny Run =

Stream in Pike County, Missouri, U.S.

Coordinates: 39.432543°N 91.422652°W

Denny Run is a stream in Pike County in the U.S. state of Missouri. It is a tributary of South Spencer Creek.

Denny Run has the name of J. V. Denny, the original owner of the site.

== See also ==
- List of rivers of Missouri
