= Deon Carolus =

South African cricketer (born 1978)

Personal information
- Born: 10 July 1978 (age 48); Port Elizabeth, South Africa
- Source: Cricinfo, 17 December 2020

Deon Carolus (born 10 July 1978) is a South African cricketer. He played in 74 first-class, 53 List A, and 12 Twenty20 matches in 1970/71.
