= Denys Chernyshov =

Ukrainian politician and economist

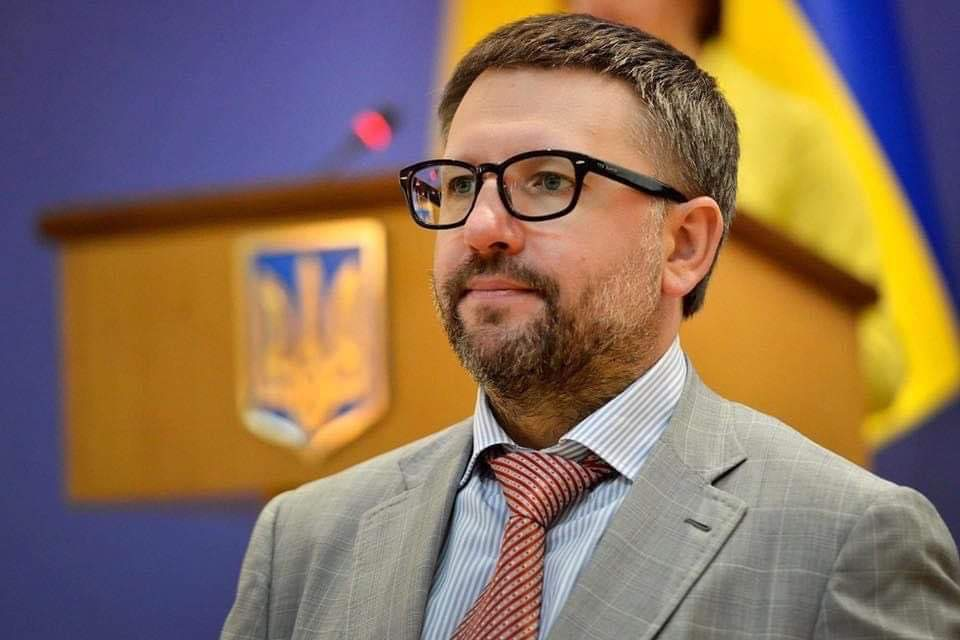

Deputy Minister of Justice of Ukraine
- In office 19 October 2016 – 11 September 2019
- President: Volodymyr Zelenskyy (2019); Petro Poroshenko (2016–2019)
- Prime Minister: Oleksiy Honcharuk (2019); Volodymyr Groysman (2016–2019)

Personal details
- Born: 11 July 1974 (age 52) Kharkov, Ukrainian SSR
- Citizenship: Ukrainian
- Education: Kyiv National Economic University; Taras Shevchenko National University of Kyiv
- Profession: economist, master of administrative management, master of law, PhD in law

Denys Viktorovych Chernyshov (Ukrainian: Денис Вікторович Чернишов; born 11 July 1974 in Kharkiv) is a Ukrainian politician and economist. He has been a Deputy Minister of Justice of Ukraine from October 2016 to September 2019. He holds a PhD in Law.

== Early life and career ==
From 2010 to 2015, he held senior positions at PJSC Bank Petrocommerce-Ukraine and PJSC JSB Ukrgasbank.

From October 2016 to September 2019, he served as Deputy Minister of Justice of Ukraine.

From September 2019 to March 2020, he is an advisor to the Chairman of the Board of PJSC JSB Ukrgasbank.

From March 2020 to the present, he has been the Deputy Chairman of PJSC JSB Ukrgasbank.

== Political career ==
On 19 October 2016, Denys Chernyshov was appointed to the post of Deputy Minister of Justice of Ukraine. On 11 September 2019, in sync with the Cabinet of Ministers, he resigned from his post of his own free will.

=== Reform of the penitentiary system ===
In order to enhance work of the justice system bodies, in 2016 the Cabinet of Ministers of Ukraine adopted a resolution that abolished the State Prison Service, and delegated its powers to the Ministry of Justice. Deputy Minister of Justice Denys Chernyshov was appointed responsible for the implementation of the reform. He is in charge of coordination and control. A passport of the reform was developed, defining its mission, goals and objectives.
