= Denisa Neagu =

Romanian politician (born 1986)

Member of the Chamber of Deputies
- Incumbent
- Assumed office 21 December 2020
- Constituency: Bucharest

Personal details
- Born: 16 October 1986 (age 39)
- Party: Save Romania Union (since 2016)

Denisa-Elena Neagu (born 16 October 1986) is a Romanian politician of the Save Romania Union. Since 2020, she has been a member of the Chamber of Deputies. She became involved in politics following the Colectiv nightclub fire.
