= Dionísio (footballer, born 1970) =

Brazilian footballer

Personal information
- Full name: Dionísio Domingos Rangel
- Date of birth: November 18, 1970 (age 55)
- Place of birth: Rio de Janeiro, Brazil
- Height: 1.77 m (5 ft 9 1/2 in)
- Position: Forward

Senior career*
Years	Team	Apps	(Gls)
1992—1993	Bangu	44	(8)
1993	FC Jazz	20	(6)
1994—1995	TPV	26	(20)
1999—2001	Tampere United	59	(27)
2005	AC Oulu	6	(0)
—2008	Ceres		
- * Club domestic league appearances and goals

Dionísio Domingos Rangel (born November 18, 1970), known as just Dionísio, is a former Brazilian football player.

== Background ==
Dionísio's first professional club was Bangu from Rio de Janeiro. In 1993 Dionísio was transferred to Finland. He played five seasons in Finnish top tier Veikkausliiga, scoring 36 goals in 98 games.

He won two Finnish championship titles, 1993 and 1994. He was also the top scorer in Veikkausliiga 1994.

Dionísio ended his career in Rio de Janeiro club Ceres.
