= Deon St. Mor =

Australian business owner and designer

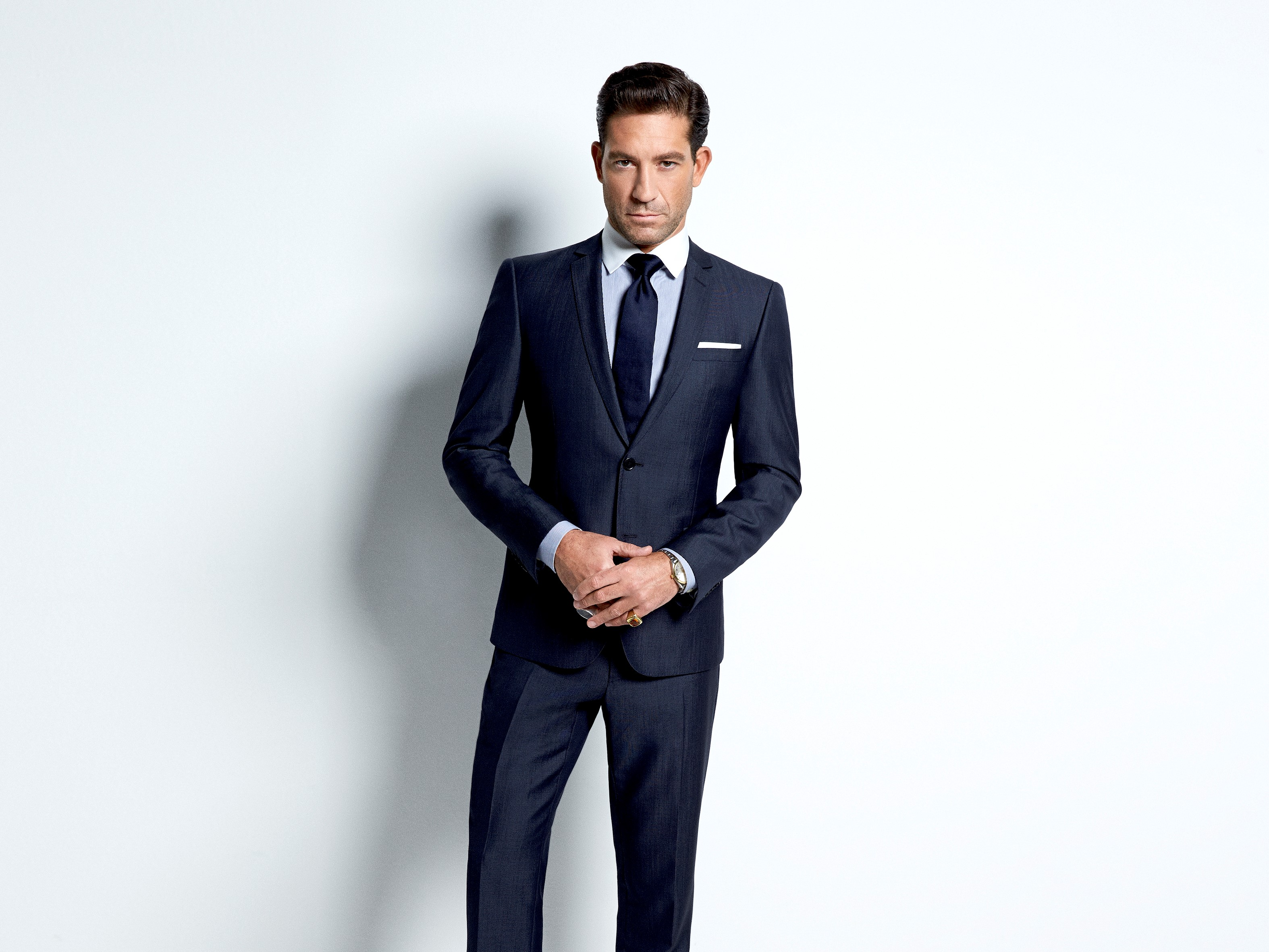
Deon St.Mor - Australian business owner

Deon St. Mor is an Australian business owner and designer. MOR cosmetics was created by Deon St. Mor and co-founder Dianna Burmas in 2001.

Of Italian descent Deon St. Mor was born in Mareeba (Far North Queensland), Australia in 1972. Mother Vivienne Cardillo is from Sicily (South Italy). Father Elso Iuretigh is from Trieste (North Italy).

== Education ==
1991 - 1992 - Associate Diploma in Design (Furniture) Bairnsdale TAFE

1993 - 1995 - Bachelor of Design (Industrial Design) RMIT University Melbourne, Australia.

== Early career ==
1995 - 1998 Deon St. Mor was the managing director and product designer for D.D.T Design. St. Mor was involved in the total development of the 'MO' Retail Concept Store project. This involved product design, furniture design, interior design, retail design, graphic design, fashion design and out-sourcing. Whilst working at D.D.T St.Mor worked on the "Southside Business Centre" project. This consisted of interior and furniture design and he also accompanied the successful launch of and design of D.D.T's own range of home ware products.

1998 - 2001 Deon St. Mor and Co-Founder Dianna Burmas met in 1998. Deon St.Mor was an industrial design graduate and co-owner of a Melbourne-based interior design company. Dianna Burmas was working as a visual merchandiser in department store floors across the globe. They were both interested in travel, food and the arts, therefore their union led to the development of an extensive range of contemporary lifestyle products and the opening of an interior-design retail store "D1" in the Melbourne CBD.

Pieces from the D1 collection included lamps, vases, cushions, candle holders and stationery with a distinct, chic-urban edge. The range extended to include a collection of soaps - their first foray into the world of beauty products. A collection of lotions, aromatic oil blends and candles followed soon after.

It was here they began to turn their designs into a cosmetics range.

== The MOR Cosmetics Brand ==
In 2001 Deon St. Mor and Dianna Burmas registered MOR Cosmetics. Deon and Dianna represent the MOR brand internationally as the media/publicity face of the brand.

== Awards ==
- "The Most Innovative and Creative Micro business of 1997" for achievements within D.D.T Design.
- "Interior Design Young Designers Finalists" Runner up for the 'MO' Project
- "BRW's fast 100 list" - Ranking 12th - 2004
- "Best stand award" 2004 New York Extracts fair
- "Atlanta Gift and Home Furnishings Market"- 2004
- "Best Stand Award" New York International Gift Fair - 2004
- "Best Stand Award" California Gift Fair - 2004
- "#1 Choice - Best Bath Buddy - Australian Cleo Best Beauty Awards 2004
- "Reed Gift Awards - Body Category - 2004
- "Australian Packaging Awards 2005 - Bronze - Folding Carton Category
- "City of Melbourne B3000 Export award - Winner - 2005 - Australia
- Best Milieu Advertisement award (REED Gift Fairs) - Winner - 2010 - Australia

== Personal life ==
Deon St. Mor currently resides in the city of Melbourne, Australia. Deon has two Jack Russell Dog's Jaspa and Spike and is a keen supporter of the RSPCA
