= Harold Denny =

American war correspondent

- Born: March 11, 1889; Des Moines, Iowa, U.S.
- Died: July 3, 1945 (aged 56); Des Moines, Iowa, U.S.
- Occupation: journalist
- Known for: Captured by during World War 2 while serving as a war correspondent

Harold Denny (March 11, 1889 – July 3, 1945) was an American war correspondent.

Denny served in the US Army's Rainbow Division, during World War I, rising from Private, to Sergeant, prior to being wounded.

He had studied at Drake University, and began his newspaper career in 1913, working for the Des Moines Register, the St. Paul Pioneer Press, and the Minneapolis Tribune, before he began working for The New York Times.

His obituary said he covered four wars, one rebellion, and the sixth undeclared war on the Manchurian border between the Soviet Union and Japan. He covered other important international stories, including the Moscow show trials. He wrote a book based on his coverage of unrest in Nicaragua, entitled "Dollars for Bullets".

Denny married Jean Bullitt Lowery, in Moscow, in 1936. She was an American woman, fifteen years his junior, from Kentucky. She predeceased him on May 21, 1943.

He was captured in November 1941, in Libya, while working there as a war correspondent, and was imprisoned as a POW. During his imprisonment he was interrogated by the Gestapo. He wrote "Behind both Lines" on his experience as a POW, after he was repatriated in May 1942.

He returned to work as a war correspondent, and covered the Invasion of Normandy, and the American advance into Germany, including being wounded during the Battle of the Bulge.

After Victory in Europe Denny was visiting his sister, in Des Moines, when he suffered a fatal heart attack, on July 3, 1945.

Secretary of War Robert P. Patterson honored war correspondents, including Denny, at an event in Washington, on November 23, 1946.
