= Dionisie Ghermani =

Romanian professor, writer, and political activist

Dionisie Alexandru Ghermani
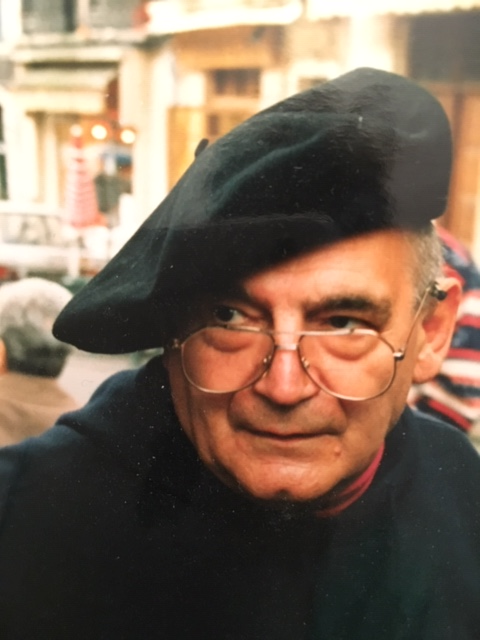
- Ghermani in 1994
- Born: Dionisie Ghermani; July 29, 1922; Bucharest, Kingdom of Romania
- Died: July 5th, 2009 (aged 86); Bucharest, Romania
- Other name: Biţi Ghermani
- Education: University of Berlin
- Occupation: Professor
- Parent: Dionisie Germani (Ghermani) (1877–1948)

Dionisie Alexandru Ghermani (July 29, 1922 – July 5, 2009) was a professor, writer, philanthropist, and political activist.

== Education and career ==
Dionisie Alexandru Ghermani was born in Bucharest. His father, Dionisie Germani (Ghermani) (1877–1948), was an engineer, professor, dean of Construction Faculty of Polytechnic University of Bucharest, and a political activist of the fascist Iron Guard. Dionisie Ghermani attended Saint Sava National College until 1941 and then graduated from the University of Berlin.

While a student at the Saint Sava National College, Dionisie Ghermani joined the local organization of the Cross Brotherhood (Frăţia de Cruce), part of the Iron Guard. He became a leader of a Brotherhood of the Cross in Bucharest. After the unsuccessful Iron Guard Rebellion (January 21–January 23, 1941), he became a political exile in Berlin, Germany.

In 1944–1945, he was a collaborator of the Romanian National Government-in-exile in Vienna, led by Horia Sima. In 1945 became a prisoner of French occupation forces at Innsbruck-Reichenau concentration camp. In August 1946, Dionisie Ghermani was liberated from Innsbruck-Reichenau. Then, he collaborated with British intelligence.

He founded the Institut für Rumänienforschung, Munich / Unterhaching (1987). Also, Dionisie Ghermani founded German Romanian Interdisciplinary Research Institute in Bucharest (1994) as a branch of Institut für Rumänienforschung; since 1995, it is autonomous.

Dionisie Ghermani died in Bucharest on July 5, 2009.

== Works ==
- Dionisie A. Ghermani, "Nationalistischer 'Internationalismus' am Beispiel Rumaeniens." Canadian Review of Studies in Nationalism II, no.2 (1974/1975): 279–296.
- Dionisie Ghermani, Desluşiri naţionale. Mit, utopie, paradigmă, ideologie, epistemologie. București, 1993, 23 pp.
- Dionisie Ghermani, Despre democraţie. Cuvânt înainte de: Stroescu-Stânişoară, Nicolae. Cluj, Dacia, 1996, 176 pp.
- Dionisie Ghermani, Mutationen und Stagnation, Strukturveränderungen und Sklerese auf dem Shachbrett der Internationalen Politik. In: EAS, 1998, 1, p. 23-32.
- Dionisie Ghermani,. Die neueste Auflage des russischen Imperialismus In: Omagiu Virgil Cândea la 75 de ani. București, 2002, I, p. 291-313.
- Dionisie Ghermani, Die nationale Souveränitätspolitik der SR Rumänien. Munich: Oldenbourg, 1981.
- Dionisie Ghermani, Die kommunistische Umdeutung der rumánischen Geschichte unter besonderer Berücksichtigung des Mittelalters (Munich: Verlag R. Oldenbourg, 1967).
- Dionisie Ghermani, Alexandru Boldur zum 90. Geburtstag, in: Südost-Forschungen 35, 1976, S. 248
- Dionisie Ghermani, Alexander von Randa (1906–1975) [Nachruf], in: Südost-Forschungen 35, 1976, S. 249–250.
