= Denis (harpsichord makers) =

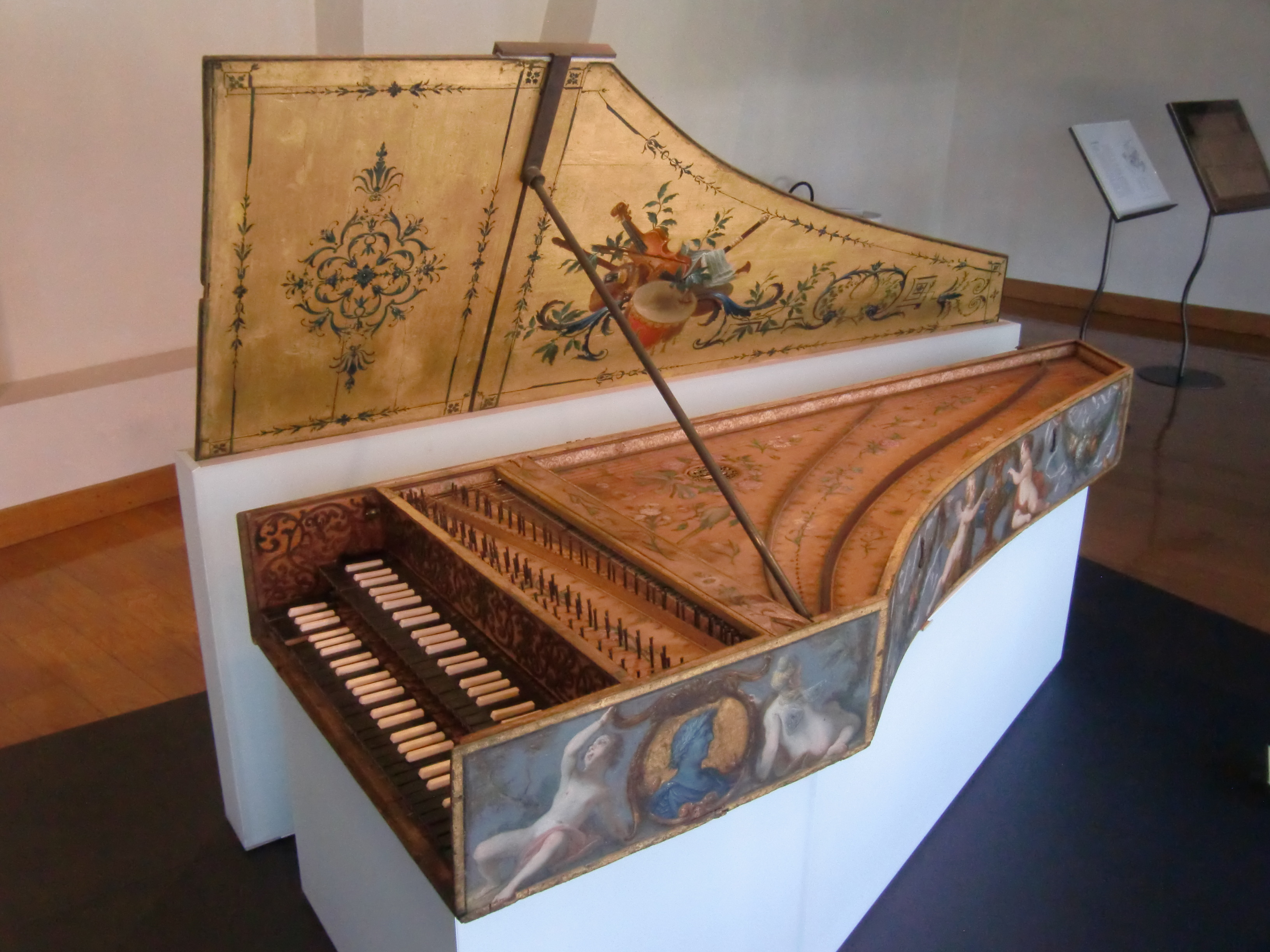
The oldest extant instrument by a member of the Denis family, dated 1648 by Jean Denis II, the family's most prominent member.

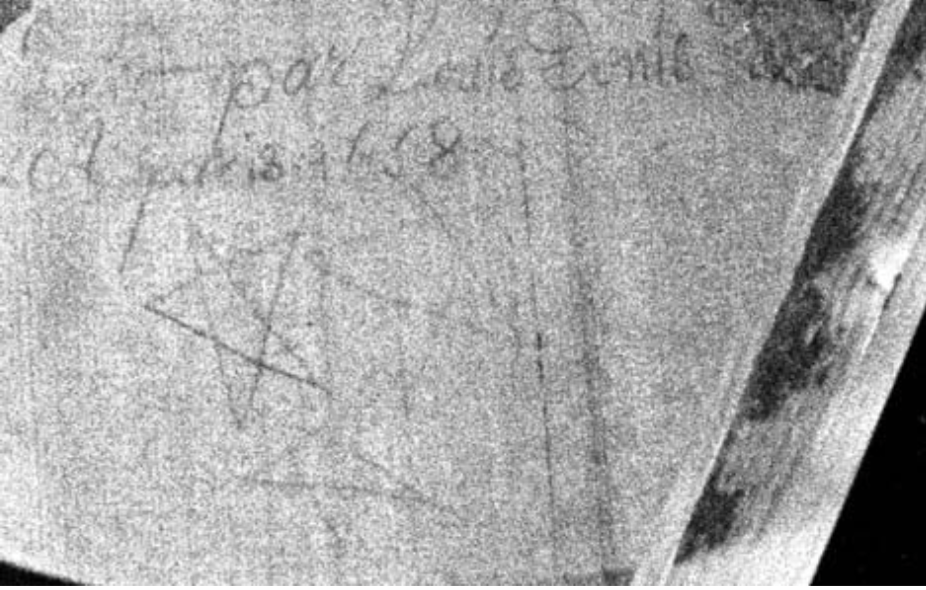
The red chalk signature of Louis Denis on the underside of the soundboard of the 1658 harpsichord. Picture by instrument's restorer, Reinhard von Nagel

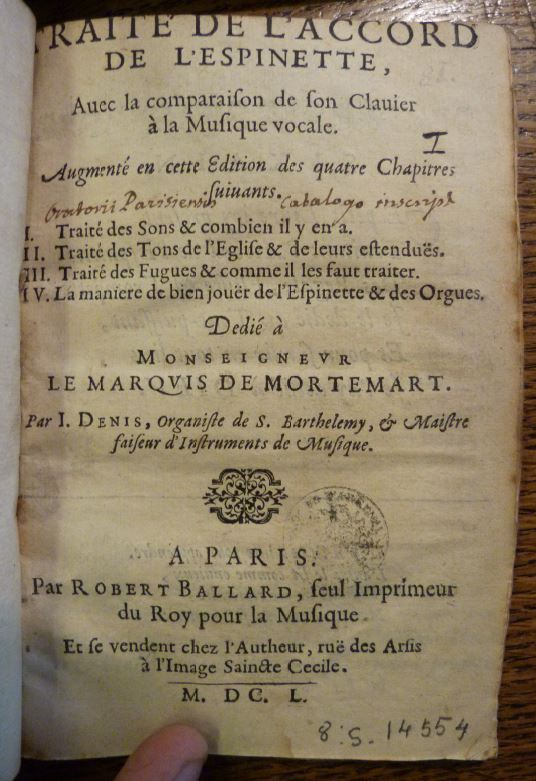
The title page of the second edition of Jean Denis' II treatise, published in 1650

The Denis family were French harpsichord makers from the mid 16th century to the beginning of the 18th century, by which time the Blanchet family had superseded them as the main harpsichord building dynasty in Paris. Members of the Denis family headed the instrument makers' guild for several generations, but only four harpsichords by members of the family have survived to modern times, and three spinets. Several of the Denis instruments are signed in red chalk under the sound board with the makers name, place of construction and date, along with three five-pointed stars. Instruments by the Denis family were held in high regard well after their time, as witnessed by an entry in the Encyclopédie Methodique from 1785: "The best makers of ordinary harpsichords have been the Ruckers in Antwerp... and Jean Denis of Paris".

== Known builders of the family ==
The following family members are recorded as building instruments:

Robert Denis I (1520 - 1589), a builder of organs and spinets in Paris.

Claude Denis (1544 - 1587), son of Robert I
Robert Denis II (died 1589), son of Robert I
Jean Denis I (c.1549 - 1634), son of Robert I, elected as jurés of the instrument makers guild in Paris in 1601

Thomas Denis (c.1585 - 1634), son of Jean I
Pierre Denis I (c.1600 - 1664), son of Jean I
Jean Denis II (1600 - 1672), son of Jean I. He was a practicing organist at the church of Saint-Barthélemy on Île de la Cité (now demolished) as well as instrument maker and was elected as jurés of the instrument makers guild in Paris in 1647. He published in 1643 a practical treatise on harpsichord tuning, Traité de l'accord de l'espinette, which is today one of the major sources on historic tuning practice, although it touched on several subjects ranging from choir music to bad performance habits of keyboard players. Jean II is survived by one double manual instrument, currently in Musée de l'Hospice Saint Roch, Issoudun, central France.

Jean Denis III (c. 1630 - 1685), son of Jean II, survived by one spinet (1667)). He was nominated as jurés of the instrument makers guild, but was not elected.
Louis Denis (1635 - 1710) son of Jean II, survived by two harpsichords (1658 and 1677) and a spinet (1681).
Philippe Denis (died 1705) son of Jean II, survived by one harpsichord and an ottavino.

'Pierre Denis II (1675-after 1705), son of Philippe

- Note that only seven surviving instruments can be attributed to this large family of builders

== See also ==
- List of historical harpsichord makers
