= Dionisi =

Dionisi is an Italian surname. Notable people with the surname include:

- Alessio Dionisi (born 1980), Italian footballer and football manager
- Armando Dionisi (born 1949), Italian politician
- Federico Dionisi (born 1987), Italian footballer
- Renato Dionisi (born 1947), Italian pole vaulter
- Renato Dionisi (composer) (1910–2000), Italian composer and music educator
- Stefano Dionisi (born 1966), Italian actor

== See also ==
- Deioneus: Deon, Deion, Deone, Dion, Dione, Dionne
- Dionisius: Dionis, Dionisi, Dionisia, Dionisie, Dionisi, Dionisije, Dionisio, Dionisiy, Dionys, Dionisiy, Dionysio, Dionysios, Dionysious, Dionysius
  - Denis, Denisa, Denise, Deniska, Denni, Dennis, Dennise, Deniss, Denisse, Denny, Dennys, Denys
