= Deon Jackson =

Deon Jackson may refer to:

- Deon Jackson (singer) (1946–2014), American soul singer and songwriter
- Deon Jackson (American football) (born 1999), American football running back

== See also ==
- Don Jackson (disambiguation)
