= Dionís Renart =

Catalan sculptor and astronomer

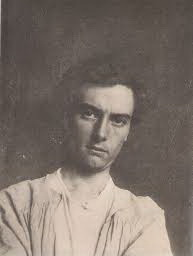
Dionís Renart in 1909

Dionís Renart i Garcia (23 March 1878 – 12 February 1946) was a Catalan sculptor and astronomer.

== Biography ==
He studied at the Llotja School also known as the "Escola d'Arts i Oficis de Barcelona", and later worked in Josep Llimona's studio. He participated in Exhibitions of Fine Art of Barcelona with (Eva, from 1911 and La Raça, from 1918) and in Madrid with his piece entitled "Al·legoria i Retrats", from 1912. He sculpted "Les Tres Maries de La Resurrecció de Jesús" in the First Mystery of Glory section on the "Rosari Monumental de Montserrat", which is the way leading up to the Montserrat Monastery which has a number of religious sculptures and symbols. On this "Les Tres Maries de la Resurrecció de Jesús" also worked Antoni Gaudí and Josep Llimona. He also worked on ceramic models, jars, medals and jewellery in line with the Art Nouveau style. He also server as anatomical sculptor for Barcelona's Medical School.

As an astronomer he was president of the lunar section of Barcelona's Astronomical Society and organizer of the Exhibition on lunar studies of 1912. He was also author of a map of the Moon produced by relief stereographic projection. Today a lunar precinct is named after him.

== Gallery ==
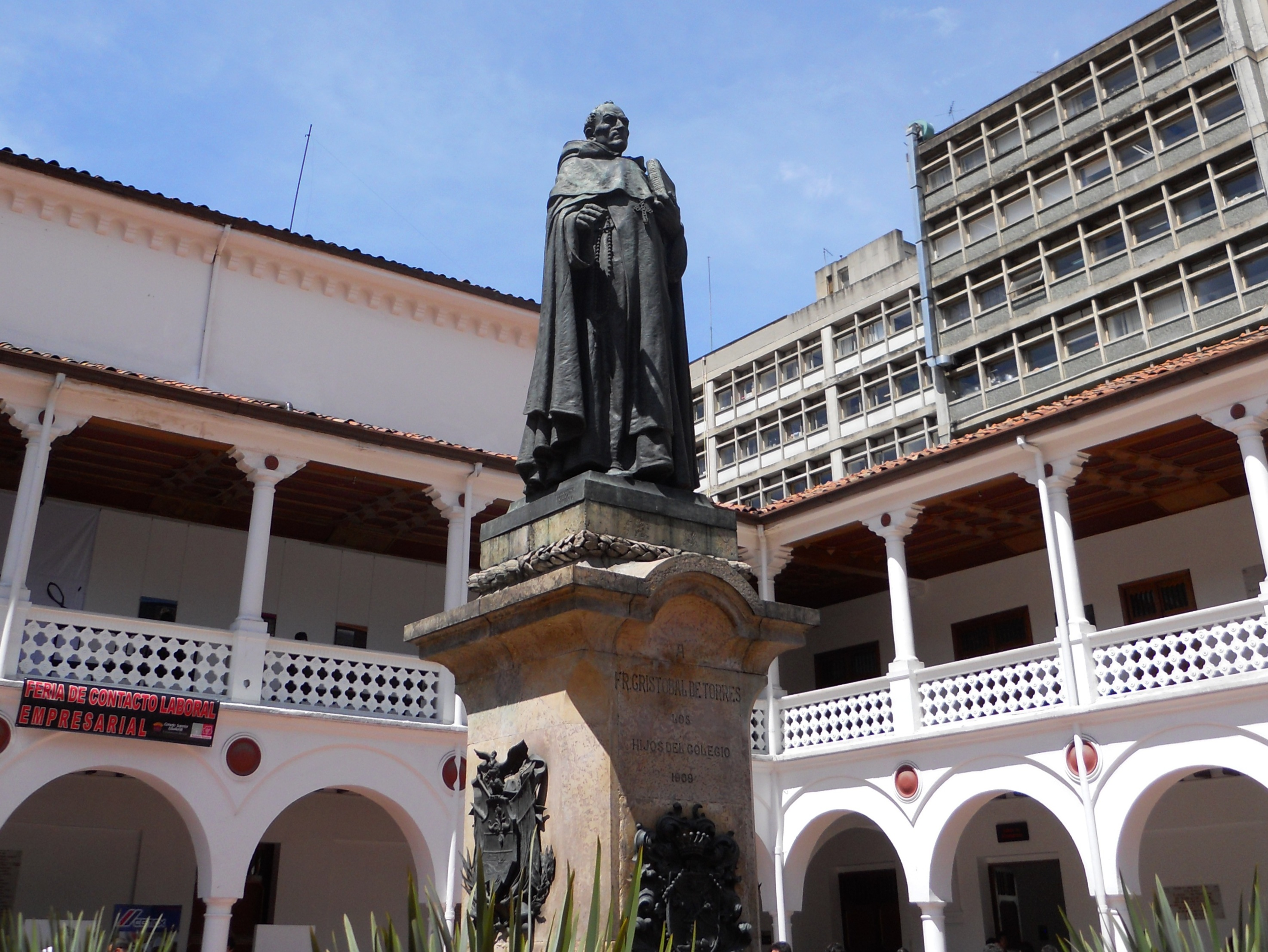
Statue of Cristóbal de Torres on the campus of Del Rosario University, Colombia.

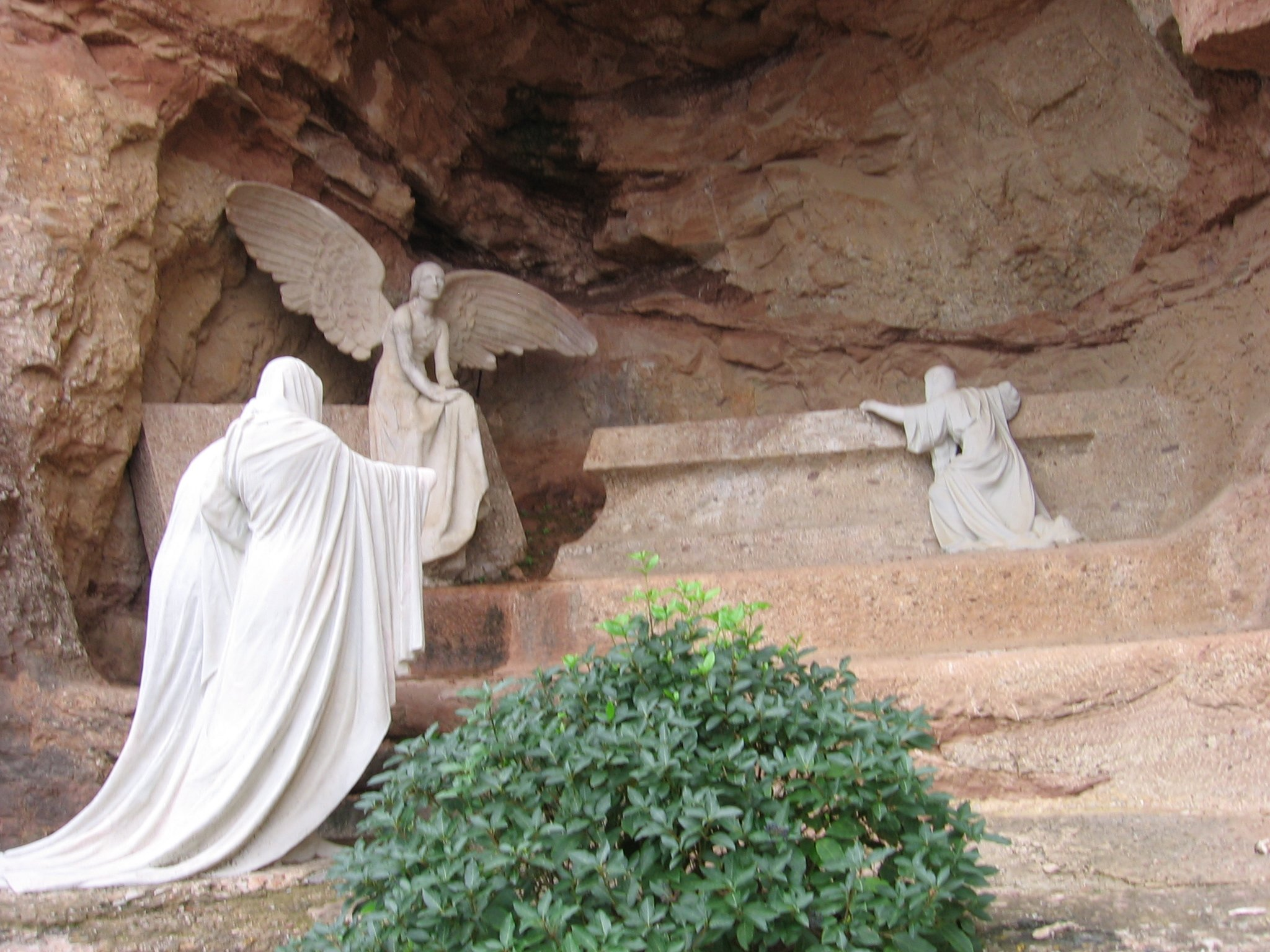
The Resurrection of Jesus. First Mystery of Glory of the Monumental Rosary of Montserrat. Santa Maria de Montserrat Abbey, Spain.
