= Dionisio Romero =

Peruvian banker

Dionisio F. Romero Seminario (born 1 April 1936) is a Peruvian banker who served as chairman of Banco de Crédito del Perú and Credicorp.

Romero was born on 1 April 1936 in Piura to Dionisio Romero Iturrospe and Micaela Seminario Aljovin. He descends from a landowning family of Spanish origin in the north of Peru. He was educated in California at San Rafael Military Academy, Pomona College and Stanford University, where he graduated with a Master of Business Administration.

Romero was the chairman of Banco de Crédito del Perú from 1966 to 1987, and has served as a board member from December 1990 to March 2009. He was the chairman of Credicorp and had held this position since August 1995 until March 2009. Additionally he serves as a director on the boards of various other companies.

He is one of the richest people in Peru, with a fortune of more than US$1 billion.
