= Deniss Čalovskis =

Latvian computer hacker

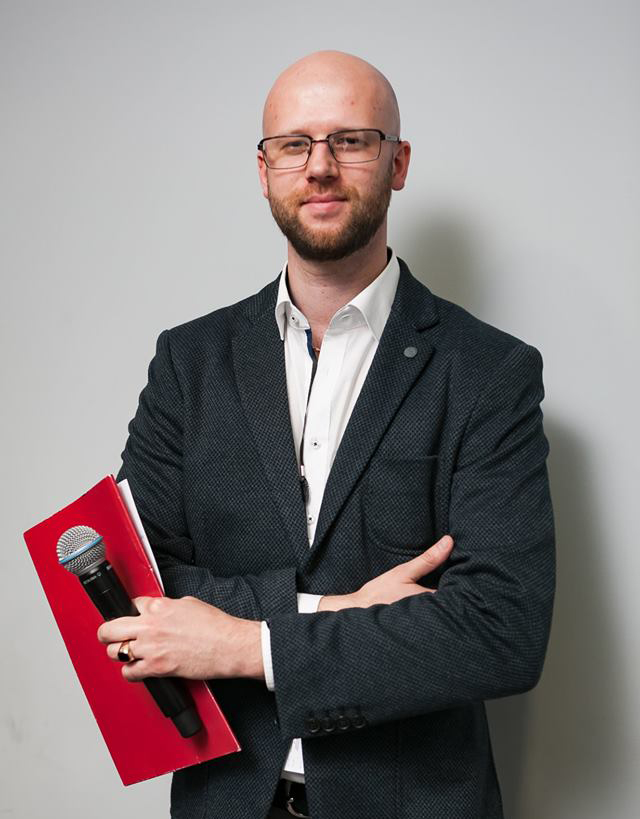
- Deniss Čalovskis at the 2018 data security forum "Digitala era"
- Born: 1985; Riga, Latvian SSR, Soviet Union
- Other names: Hacker of Imanta

Deniss Čalovskis (born 1985 in Riga, Latvian SSR, Soviet Union) is a Latvian computer hacker. He is the creator of the Gozi virus. Calovskis is a certified Data Protection Officer (DPO).

== Hacker ==
In February 2015, Deniss Čalovskis was extradited to the U.S. from Latvia to face 67 years in prison.

In September 2015, Čalovskis pleaded guilty to conspiring to commit computer intrusions. On January 5, 2016, he sentenced to time served after spending over 20 months in Latvian and American jails.

The Gozi virus was prevalent between 2005 and 2012, infecting between 17,000 and 40,000 computers including some at NASA. Financial losses from the virus stand "at a minimum, millions of dollars", according to the indictment.

In August 2014, Čalovskis began working at the Latvian Medical Association. Čalovskis started several social nonprofit projects for the local community in Latvia.
