= Denny Fercho =

American handball player

Personal information
- Born: October 28, 1969 (age 56) Ventura, California, United States

Sport
- Sport: Handball

Denny Fercho (born October 28, 1969) is an American handball player. He competed in the men's tournament at the 1996 Summer Olympics.
