= Denys Shevchenko =

Ukrainian footballer

Personal information
- Full name: Denys Serhiyovych Shevchenko
- Date of birth: 3 April 2003 (age 23)
- Place of birth: Ukraine
- Height: 1.71 m (5 ft 7 in)
- Position: Midfielder

Team information
- Current team: Kryvbas Kryvyi Rih
- Number: 22

Youth career
- 2014–2016: Shakhtar Kryvyi Rih
- 2016–2021: Shakhtar Donetsk

Senior career*
Years	Team	Apps	(Gls)
2021–	Kryvbas Kryvyi Rih	4	(0)

International career^{‡}
2018	Ukraine U15	1	(0)
- * Club domestic league appearances and goals as of 9 March 2023 ‡ National team caps and goals as of 24 August 2022

Denys Serhiyovych Shevchenko (Ukrainian: Денис Сергійович Шевченко; born 3 April 2003) is a Ukrainian professional footballer who plays as a midfielder for Kryvbas Kryvyi Rih.

== Career ==
=== Early years ===
Shevchenko began his career at Shakhtar Kryvyi Rih and then continued at the Shakhtar Donetsk academy.

=== Shakhtar Donetsk ===
He played in the Ukrainian Premier League Reserves until May 2021 and never made his debut for the senior Shakhtar Donetsk squad.

=== Kryvbas Kryvyi Rih ===
In September 2021 Shevchenko signed a contract with the newly promoted Ukrainian Premier League side Kryvbas Kryvyi Rih and made his league debut as a second half-time substitute player in the losing away match against Kolos Kovalivka on 23 August 2022.
