= Denny Hadican =

American retired soccer player

Personal information
- Full name: Dennis Hadican
- Place of birth: St. Louis, Missouri, U.S.
- Position: Forward

College career
Years	Team	Apps	(Gls)
1970–1973	Saint Louis Billikens		

Senior career*
Years	Team	Apps	(Gls)
1974	St. Louis Stars	3	(0)
- * Club domestic league appearances and goals

Dennis Hadican is an American retired soccer forward who played professionally in the North American Soccer League.

Hadican attended Saint Louis University, playing on the men's soccer team from 1970 to 1973. During that time, he was part of three NCAA Men's Division I Soccer Championship teams. In 1970, he scored the game-winning goal in a 1–0 win over the UCLA Bruins for the national title. He was inducted into the Billikens Hall of Fame in 2001. In 1974, the Seattle Sounders selected Hadican in the North American Soccer League draft. They then traded him to the St. Louis Stars. He played three games for the Stars in 1975. The Stars then traded him to the Sounders in exchange for a 1976 draft pick. In 2002, the St. Louis Soccer Hall of Fame inducted Hadican.
