= Battle of Saint-Denis =

Battle of Saint-Denis may refer to:

- Battle of Saint-Denis (1567), France (French Wars of Religion)
- Battle of Saint-Denis (1678), Belgium (Franco-Dutch War)
- Battle of Saint-Denis (1815), fought in outskirts of Paris between the Prussians and French during the Waterloo Campaign
- Battle of Saint-Denis (1837), Canada (Lower Canada Rebellion)
