= Denny Gigliotti =

Italian footballer (born 1991)

Personal information
- Date of birth: 20 July 1991 (age 35)
- Place of birth: Soveria Mannelli, Italy
- Height: 1.75 m (5 ft 9 in)
- Position: Midfielder

Team information
- Current team: Forlì
- Number: 23

Senior career*
Years	Team	Apps	(Gls)
2009–2012	Catanzaro	41	(4)
2012	Città di Marino	10	(1)
2013	Gimigliano		
2013–2014	HinterReggio	22	(4)
2014–2019	Rende	118	(20)
2019	→ Virtus Francavilla (loan)	13	(1)
2019–2020	Virtus Francavilla	17	(1)
2020–	Forlì	7	(1)
- * Club domestic league appearances and goals as of 7 February 2021

Denny Gigliotti (born 20 July 1991) is an Italian footballer who plays as a midfielder for Forlì.

== Club career ==
=== Catanzaro ===
He made his full debut for Catanzaro against Sorrento on 8 August 2010 in a 6-0 loss. He came on as a sub against Isola Liri in the 71st minute and scored the 4th goal in the 87th minute in a 5–0 home win.

=== Virtus Francavilla ===
On 25 January 2019, he joined Virtus Francavilla on loan. On 13 July 2019, he moved to Virtus Francavilla on a permanent basis.

=== Serie D ===
On 27 December 2020 he signed with Forlì.
