= Ewout Denys =

Belgian footballer

Personal information
- Full name: Ewout Albert Marie-Louise Denijs
- Date of birth: 4 February 1987 (age 39)
- Place of birth: Bruges, Belgium
- Height: 1.84 m (6 ft 0 in)
- Position: Attacking midfielder

Team information
- Current team: SK Rapid Leest

Youth career
- 2001–2004: SV Ruddervoorde
- 2004–2006: Cercle Brugge

Senior career*
Years	Team	Apps	(Gls)
2006–2008	Cercle Brugge	8	(0)
2007–2008	→ SK Deinze	19	(0)
2008–2010	Standaard Wetteren		
2010–2011	Eendracht Aalst	22	(1)
2011–2014	Standaard Wetteren	99	(10)
2014–2016	Rupel Boom	41	(4)
2016–2019	KFC Eppegem		
2020–	SK Rapid Leest		

International career
2007	Belgium U-21	1	(0)
- * Club domestic league appearances and goals as of 19:00, 4 February 2021 (UTC)

Ewout Albert Marie-Louise Denijs (born 4 February 1987 in Bruges) is a Belgian professional football player who plays for SK Rapid Leest. He usually plays as an attacking midfielder.

== Career ==
Denys was plucked away by Cercle Brugge at a young age when he was playing for his home side, SV Ruddervoorde, the same team where Thomas Buffel started his career. He made his début for the first team of Cercle on 9 September 2006 in a 1–2 win against SV Zulte Waregem. He was once in the starting eleven against Lierse.

For the 2007-08 season, Denys is loaned to SK Deinze in the Belgian Second Division.

Denijs signed a contract with Standaard Wetteren on 29 May 2008.

In 2014, Denijs moved to third-division side K. Rupel Boom FC.
