= Dionysios Demetis =

Greek composer

Dionysios Demetis (Greek: Διονύσιος Δεμέτης) (also Dionisis) is a Greek composer, born in 1979 in Athens. He studied piano at the Ethnikon Odion in Athens. He is best known for two of his compositions, "Moonlight" and "Abyss". He released his first CD of piano compositions in 2000, The Heart Wreck on SpinRecords, a California record label. In 2006, he released his second CD, The Mark of Innocence. Demetis is also the composer of the anthem of the International Society for Spacetime Physics.
