= Denys Kushnarov =

Ukrainian filmmaker, journalist and actor

Denys Kushnarov (Ukrainian: Денис Кушнарьов) is a Ukrainian filmmaker, journalist and actor. He is the first Ukrainian TV-journalist to cover the Oscar Awards and the Golden Globe Award Ceremony 2019–2020. He is also the author of special TV-reports from the Cannes Film Festival in 2016–2017 & Venice Film Festival 2018 for different media: TV-channel INTER. TV-Channel Ukraine, daynight.tv

== Early life ==
Kushnarov graduated from lyceum “Erudite” with a golden medal in Liberal Arts. He graduated from Donetsk National University with a specialization in translation (German, English). He moved to Kyiv and won a quiz show, which helped him to graduate from TV school.

== Career ==
He worked as a freelance journalist for the travel magazines Welcome to Ukraine and International Tourism. He then began working for Ukrainian TV channels as a journalist and screenwriter.

In 2015 he began work as a film director and released Rocketman, a documentary that was awarded "Best Ukrainian Short 2015" by the National Filmmakers' Union of Ukraine.

His short film Make Music, Not War was shortlisted at multiple film festivals: Szczecin European Film Festival (Poland), Show Me Justice Film Festival (USA), and the 39th Elche International Independent Film Festival. Kushnarov's short film There is a Place was awarded at the Short Cut Film Festival (Serbia) and at the 7th International Green Culture Festival (Serbia). It was also shortlisted at the 29th Girona Film Festival (Spain). In 2018 his short film Annihilation entered as an official selection of the 36th Fajr International Film Festival in Iran, Tehran.
