= Dionysius of Miletus =

5th-century BC Greek historian

Dionysius of Miletus (Greek: Διονύσιος ὁ Μιλήσιος, romanized: Dionýsios ho Milḗsios) was an ancient Greek ethnographer and historian. He may have lived in the 5th century BC and was a contemporary of Hecataeus of Miletus according to the Suda (a tenth century Byzantine encyclopedia).

== Works ==
Dionysius is the alleged author of several works:

- Troica (in three books)
- History of Persia (Persica). Written in Ionic Greek.
- Description of the Inhabited World
- The Events after Darius (in five books)
- Historical Cycle (in seven books)

According to the Iranologist Rüdiger Schmitt, Dionysius was reportedly the author of a book about Persian history after the death of Darius the Great (r. 522–486 BC). Schmitt adds:

As in the only surviving historical notice, preserved in a scholium to Herodotus, there is reference to the removal of the false Smerdis, it seems probable that the fragment belongs to the introductory, “retrospective” part of Dionysius’ books and that the detailed description of Persian history began only with the death of Darius.

According to the modern historian Klaus Meister in the Oxford Classical Dictionary, except for the possible exception of the Persica and The Events after Darius (as they might be genuine), the actual historicity of Dionysius's works are contested. Meister adds:

Jacoby accepts them as historical, von Fritz is probably justified in not doing so, since there are no allusions in Herodotus nor any important quotations in the rest of the tradition. Under no circumstances may one take Dionysius to be an important source for Herodotus (cf. M. Moggi) or even call him the ‘father of history’.

== Sources ==
- Meister, Klaus (2012). "Dionysius (5), of Miletus". In Hornblower, Simon; Spawforth, Antony; Eidinow, Esther (eds.). The Oxford Classical Dictionary (4 ed.). Oxford University Press.
- Schmitt, Rüdiger (1995). "DIONYSIUS". In Yarshater, Ehsan (ed.). Encyclopædia Iranica. Vol. VII/4: Deylam, John of–Divorce IV. In modern Persia. London and New York: Routledge & Kegan Paul. p. 423. ISBN 978-1-56859-022-6.
