= Denny Somach =

American businessman, author and radio producer

Denny Somach is an American businessman, author, and Grammy Award winning radio producer. He is the founder of Denny Somach Productions, an independent production company that produces syndicated and network programming.

== Biography ==
Somach attended Moravian College in Bethlehem, Pennsylvania, where he received a Bachelor of Arts degree. After graduating in 1975, Somach became an announcer at WSAN, a progressive rock station in nearby Allentown. He later worked at WYSP-FM in Philadelphia as an announcer and programmer before launching his own independent production company, Denny Somach Productions (DSP), in 1981. Among the syndicated and network radio programming produced by DSP are a number of successful productions, including The Classics, a widely syndicated weekly retrospective show that was originated in 1999 as The Rock of the Century; Legends of Rock;Psychedelic Psnack (Westwood One); Live From the Hard Rock Cafe NBC. Somach has been a consultant or director for several cable networks, including MTV, Cable Music Channel, the Comedy Channel and The Fine Living Network. He produced The News That Rocked '81, the first outside program broadcast on MTV. He is the co-creator of Friday Night Videos on NBC and was also a consultant for XM Satellite Radio and a contributor to Comcast Network. Among his television production credits are Evening/PM Magazine; Solid Gold Rock 'n Roll the first 30-minute music infomercial; and Sixty Greatest Hits of the Sixties, the first long form record collection infomercial featuring a package developed by a major record label. The infomercials featured Wolfman Jack and Davy Jones, respectively. Somach has also produced records and videos for artists such as Johnny Winter, Todd Rundgren, Alan Parsons, and Barbara Mandrell. He served as executive producer for Eric Johnson's album Ah Via Musicom, featuring the Grammy Award winning song "Cliffs of Dover".

In addition to producing, Somach hosted the show Hot Spots, a weekly concert series he developed for USA Network. He has authored two books on the Beatles: Ticket to Ride (1989) and Meet the Beatles...Again (1995). His latest book, Get the Led Out-How Led Zeppelin Became the Biggest Band in the World," was published on November 6, 2012. An updated version was published in April 2014. Somach currently writes and produces "Carol Miller's Get the Led Out," which airs on over 100 radio stations.

Somach is also the co-founder of the Cinema record label.
