= Dionysius III =

Dionysius III can refer to:

- Dionysius III of Antioch, Syriac Orthodox Patriarch of Antioch in 958–961
- Dionysius III of Constantinople, Metropolitan of Larissa in 1652–1662, Ecumenical Patriarch of Constantinople in 1662–1665
- Mar Dionysius III, Malankara Metropolitan in 1817–1825
