= William F. Denny =

American performer and recording artist

William F. Denny (circa 1860 – October 2, 1908) was an American vaudeville performer and pioneer recording artist.

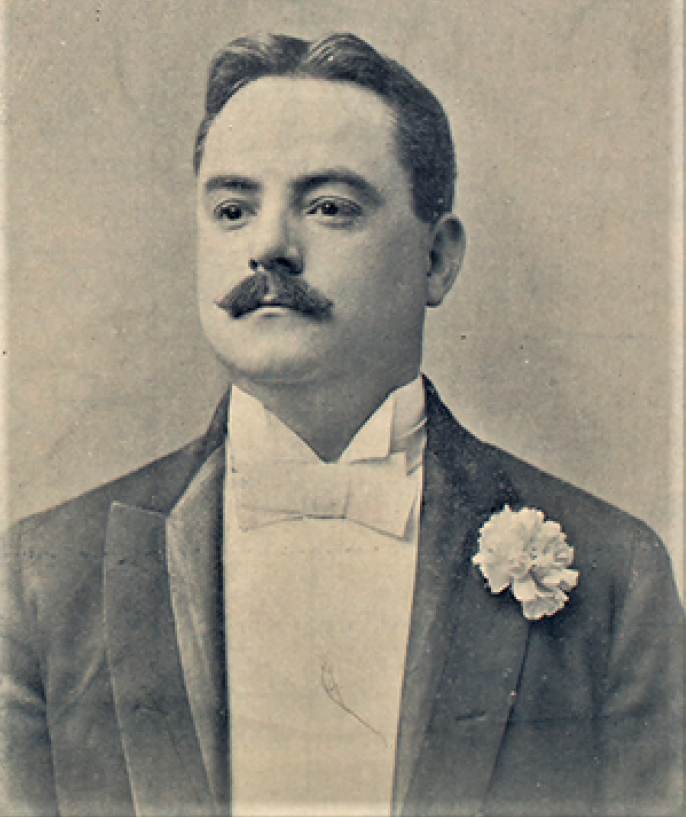
Denny ca. 1899

== Biography ==
William F. Denny (also known as Will F. Denny) was born in late 1859 or more likely in 1860 in Boston, to James and Elizabeth Denny. He gained fame performing on vaudeville stages, specializing in comic numbers. His first recordings were made in 1891 for the New England Phonograph Company. Beginning in May 1898 his popularity was such that he signed an exclusive recording contract with Columbia that was in effect for one year. He had a singular recording session for Victor Records on September 11, 1901. His last records were made for the Zonophone company. He died in Seattle on October 2, 1908 of atherosclerosis, while touring on the Pantages vaudeville circuit, and was buried in Philadelphia.

== Partial discography ==
Berliner Gramophone

- 1748 – "Czar of the Tenderloin" (recorded July 14, 1897)
- 1749 – "I Didn't Know"
- 1750 – "Darling Mabel"
- 1762 – "She Was There"
- 0125-I – "How'd You Like to Be the Iceman" (recorded May 2, 1899)
- 0126-I – "When a Woman Loves" (recorded May 3, 1899)
- 0129-I – "And the Parrot Said" (recorded May 3, 1899)

Columbia Records

cylinders

- 6325 – "A Pity to Waste It"
- 6351 – "What Ze English Call Ze"
- 6365 – "Miss Helen Hunt"
- 32919 – "Nothing Like That in Our Family"

discs

- 53 – "When The Harvest Days Are Over"
- 318 – "When Reuben Comes to Town" (Goodwin – Levi)
- 319 – "I Want to Be a Military Man" (Hall – Stuart)
- 0279 - "FOL DE IDDLEY IDO"
- 3368 – "Nothing Like That in Our Family"
- A489 – "You'll Have to Get Out and Walk" (recorded May 1907)

Edison Records

- 6602 - "A widows plea for her son - parody"
- 7154 – "Naughty Banana Peel"
- 7379 – "Parody on 'Because'"
- 7875 – "Ain't Dat a Shame?"
- 7980 – "My Ebony Belle"
- 8015? – "Rip Van Winkle was a lucky man" c1902 from owned Edison Cylinder record
- 8167 – "I Couldn't"
- 8442 – "Just When I Needed You Most"
- 8443 – "For Old Time's Sake"
- 8552 – "Trixie"
- 9306 – "Nothing Like That in Our Family"
- 9551 – "Ask Me Not" (Cobbs – Edwards)
- 9568 – "You'll Have to Get Off and Walk" (Dave Reed)
- 9598 – "Tale of the Bucket" (Joe A. Budd)
- 9620 – "My Word! What a Lot of It!" (Dave Reed)

New England Phonograph Company

- (?) – "You Can't Think of Everything"

Victor Records

- 953, 3561 – "I Want Someone to Care for Me"
- 955, 3563 – "The Turkey and the Turk"
- 956, 3564 – "Any Old Place I Hang My Hat Is Home Sweet Home to Me"
- 957, 3565 – "I'm Looking at You, 'Lize"
- 958, 3566 – "The Tick Tack Tocking of the Clocking on Her Stocking"
- 959, 3567 – "The Shadows on the Door"
- 960, 3568 – "Oh! Don't it Tickle You?"
- 961, 3569 – "At the Pan-I-Merry-Can"
- 962, 3570 – "Sarah from Syracuse"

Zonophone Records

- 769 – "Rip Van Winckle Was a Lucky Man"
- 787 – "Ain't Dat a Shame"
- 1545 – "Sadie Say You Won't Be Sorry"
- 1546 – "Just When I Needed You Most"
- 1690 – "The Turkey and the Turk"
- 1798 – "I'm Tired"
- 9924 – "You Said a Plenty"
- 5934 – "Meet Me in St. Louis, Louis"
- 1048 – "All the Girls Look Good to Me"
- 1081 – "Since My Mariutch Learned the Merry Widow Waltz"
