= Patriarch Dionysius =

Patriarch Dionysius may refer to:

In the Syriac Orthodox Church:

- Patriarch Dionysius I Telmaharoyo, head of the Syriac Orthodox Church in 818–845

In the Church of Constantinople:

- Dionysius I of Constantinople, Ecumenical Patriarch in 1466–1471 and 1488–1490
- Dionysius II of Constantinople, Ecumenical Patriarch in 1546–1556
- Dionysius III of Constantinople, Ecumenical Patriarch in 1662–1665
- Dionysius IV of Constantinople, Ecumenical Patriarch in 1671–73, 1676–79, 1682–84, 1686–87, and 1693–94
- Dionysius V of Constantinople, Ecumenical Patriarch in 1887–1891
