= Dionysos (disambiguation) =

Dionysos or Dionysus is a god in Greek mythology.

Dionysos or Dionysus may also refer to:

== Film ==
- Dionysos (film), a 1984 French comedy film
- Dionysus (film), a 1970 film

== Music ==
=== Bands ===
- Dionysos (Canadian band), a rock band formed in 1967
- Dionysos (French band), a rock band formed in 1993
- Dionysus (band), a Swedish/German power metal band

=== Other music ===
- Dionysos (album), a 2004 album by Lux Occulta
- Dionysos (opera), a 2010 opera by Wolfgang Rihm
- Dionysus (album), a 2018 album by Dead Can Dance
- "Dionysus" (BTS song), 2019
- "Dionysus" (President song), 2025

== Other uses ==
- 3671 Dionysus, an asteroid
- Dionysus (Marvel Comics), a character in the Marvel Universe
- Dionysos, Greece, north suburb of Athens.

== See also ==
- Dionysius (disambiguation)
- Saint Dionysius (disambiguation)
- Theatre of Dionysus, an ancient Greek theatre
