= Denny =

Denny or Dennie may refer to:

== People ==
- Denny (given name), a list of people named Denny or Dennie
- Denny (surname), a list of people surnamed Denny or Dennie
- Denny (hybrid hominin)

== Places ==
- Denny, California, a ghost town
- Denny, Falkirk, a town in Scotland
- Denny Island, in the Severn Estuary, between England and Wales
- Denny Island (Canada), British Columbia
- Denny Triangle, Seattle, a neighborhood in the United States
- Denny Run, a stream in the U.S. state of Missouri
- 23257 Denny, an asteroid named after Bob Denny

== Other uses ==
- Denny Abbey, a former abbey in Cambridgeshire, England
- Denny baronets, three baronetcies
- Denny Party, American pioneer group
- Denny's, a large restaurant chain
- Denny Field (Alabama), former home stadium for the University of Alabama football team
- Denny Field (Washington), former home grounds for the University of Washington football team
- William Denny and Brothers, often referred to as "Denny", Scottish shipbuilding firm in business from 1840 to 1963
