= Deon =

Deon is a given name.

People with the name include:

- Deon (footballer), José Aldean Oliveira de Jesus (1987–2023), Brazilian footballer
- Deon Anderson (born 1983), American football player
- Deon Apps (born 1987), Australian rugby league footballer
- Deon Bird (born 1976), Australian rugby league footballer
- Deon Birtwistle (born 1980), Australian lightweight rower
- Deon Boakye, Ghanaian afropop musician
- Deon Broomfield (born 1991), American football player
- Deon Burton (born 1976), English-born Jamaican footballer
- Deon Bush (born 1993), American football player
- Deon Butler (born 1986), American football player
- Deon Cain (born 1996), American football player
- Deon Carney (born 1991), South African rugby union footballer
- Deon Carolus (born 1978), South African cricketer
- Deon Carstens (born 1979), South African rugby union footballer
- Deon Cole (born 1972), American actor, comedian and screenwriter
- Deon Cross (born 1996), English rugby league footballer
- Deon Davids (born 1968), South African rugby union coach
- Deon de Kock (born 1975), South African rugby union footballer
- Deon Dreyer (1974–1994), South African diver
- Deon du Plessis (1952–2011), South African publisher
- Deon Dyer (born 1977), American football player
- Deon Edwin (born 1992), American basketball player
- Deon Estus (1956–2021), American bassist and singer
- Deon Ferreira (1946–2002), South African Army general
- Deon Figures (born 1970), American football player
- Deon Fourie (born 1986), South African rugby union footballer
- Deon Fourie (army general) (1932–2025), South African officer, academic, military historian and heraldist
- Deon Grant (born 1979), American football player
- Deon Helberg (born 1989), South African rugby union footballer
- Deon Hemmings (born 1968), Jamaican female 400 metres hurdler
- Deon Hotto (born 1990), Namibian footballer
- Deon Humphrey (born 1976), American football player
- Deon Jackson, multiple people
- Deon Jones (born 1993), American basketball player
- Deon Joubert, South African tennis player
- Deon Kayser (born 1970), South African rugby union footballer and coach
- Deon Kenzie (born 1996), Australian Paralympic athlete
- Deon King (born 1993), American football player
- Deon Kipping (born 1979), American gospel musician
- Deon Kotzé (born 1973), Namibian cricketer
- Deon Kruis (born 1974), South African cricketer
- Deon Lacey (born 1990), American football player
- Deon Lee (born 1982), South Korean born composer
- Deon Lendore (1992–2022), Trinidadian sprinter
- Deon Long (born 1991), American football player
- Deon Lotter (born 1957), South African rugby union player
- Deon Lotz (born 1964), South African actor
- Deon Lyle (born 1996), American basketball player
- Deon Maas, South African filmmaker, writer and journalist
- Deon McCaulay (born 1987), Belizean footballer
- Deon Meyer, South African thriller novelist
- Deon Miles, American chemist
- Deon Minor (born 1973), American former track and field athlete
- Deon Moore (born 1999), Guyanese footballer
- Deon Mouton (born 1974), Namibian rugby union player
- Deon Muir (born 1973), New Zealand rugby union footballer
- Deon Murphy (born 1986), American gridiron football player
- Deon Oosthuysen (born 1963), South African rugby union footballer
- Deon Nielsen Price (born 1934), American pianist, composer and educator
- Deon Richmond (born 1978), American actor
- Deon Saffery (born 1988), Welsh squash player
- Deon Simon (born 1990), American football player
- Deon Slabbert (born 2000), South African rugby union player
- Deon Smith (born 1968), South African cricketer
- Deon St. Mor, Australian designer
- Deon Stegmann (born 1986), South African rugby union footballer
- Deon Stewardson (1951–2017), British-South African actor
- Deon Strother (born 1972), American football player
- Deon Swiggs (born 1986), New Zealand politician
- Deon Taylor (born 1976), American film director
- Deon Tedder (born 1990), American politician
- Deon Thomas (born 1971), American-Israeli basketball player
- Deon Thompson (born 1988), American basketball player
- Deon van der Walt (1958–2005), South African operatic tenor
- Deon van Rensburg (born 1982), South African rugby union footballer
- Deon Woodman (born 2002), Kenyan footballer
- Deon Yelder (born 1995), American football player
- Deon Temne (1972), Sierra Leonean-American, Afrocentrism, human rights activist
- Deon Wilson, protagonist in the film Chappie

== See also ==
- d'Eon, a surname
- Deioneus: Deon, Deion, Deone, Dion, Dione, Dionne
