= Dione =

Dione may refer to:

== Astronomy ==
- 106 Dione, a large main belt asteroid
- Dione (moon), a moon of Saturn
- Helene (moon), a moon of Saturn sometimes referred to as "Dione B"

== Mythology ==
- Dione (Titaness), a Titaness in Greek mythology
- Dione (mythology), a name for various women in Greek mythology

== Biology ==
- Dione (alga), a genus of red algae in the family Bangiaceae
- Dione (butterfly), a genus in the family Heliconiinae
- Pitar dione, the elegant venus clam

== Ships ==
- Dione 98, a Spanish sailboat design
- USCGC Dione, a US Coast Guard Cutter

== Chemistry ==
- Diketone (Dione), a molecule containing two ketone groups
- Ethylene dione (ethylenedione, ethene dione, or ethene 1,2-dione), a hypothetical chemical compound with the formula C_{2}O_{2} (O=C=C=O)

== Given name ==
- Dione Digby, Baroness Digby (born 1934), British arts administrator
- Dione Housheer (born 1999), Dutch handball player
- Dee Dee Sharp (born Dione LaRue, 1945), American R&B singer
- Dione Lucas (1909–1971), English chef and first female graduate of Le Cordon Bleu
- Dione Meier (born 1981), Canadian softball player
- Dione Orrom, British producer
- Dione Miguel Ribas (born 1993), Brazilian footballer
- Dione Santos (born 1979), Brazilian footballer
- Dione Taylor (born 1975), Canadian jazz singer
- Dione Venables (1930–2023), English female novelist and publisher

== Literature ==
- Dione (play), a 1720 work by the British writer John Gay

== Popular culture ==
- Dee Bliss (Dione "Dee" Rebecchi), from the Australian soap opera Neighbours
- Thanos, a villain in Marvel Comics, was originally given the name by his mother

== Surname ==
- Dione (Serer surname), a West African surname among the Serer people with no connection to the French "Dione"
- Rose Dione (1875–1936), French actress
- Aura Dione, Danish singer-songwriter

== Other ==
- Dione plc, a former UK-based point-of-sale equipment manufacturer, now part of VeriFone

== See also ==
- Deioneus: Deon, Deion, Deone, Dion, Dione, Dionne
