= Deion =

Deion is a given name. Notable people with the name include:

- Deion Barnes (born 1993), American football player
- Deion Belue (born 1991), American football player
- Deion Branch (born 1979), American football player
- Deion Burks (born 2003), American football player
- Deion Harris (born 1995), American football player
- Deion Jones (born 1994), American football player
- Deion Jumah (born 1989), English boxer
- Deion Mikesell (born 1987), American rugby union player
- Deion Sanders (born 1967), American football coach, former football and baseball player
- Deion Turman (born 1992), American basketball player
- Deion Jackson (born 1997), American rapper

== See also ==
- Deioneus: Deon, Deion, Deone, Dion, Dione, Dionne
- d'Eon, a surname
