= Deone =

Deone is a given name. Notable people with the given name include:

- Deone Bucannon (born 1992), American former professional football player
- Deone Walker (born 2004), American professional football defensive tackle
- Deone Zanotto, Australian actress, singer, and dancer

== See also ==
- Deioneus: Deon, Deion, Deone, Dion, Dione, Dionne
