= Deioneus =

Set index of mythological characters

In Greek mythology, Deioneus (/daɪˈoʊniːəs/; Ancient Greek: Δηιονεύς, romanized: Dēioneús, lit. 'ravager') or Deion (/ˈdaɪ.ɒn/ or /ˈdiːɒn/; Ancient Greek: Δηίων, romanized: Deiōn or Dēīōn) is a name attributed to the following individuals:

- Deioneus, king of Phocis and son of King Aeolus of Aeolia and Enarete, daughter of Deimachus. He was the brother of Salmoneus, Sisyphus, Cretheus, Perieres, Athamas, Magnes, Calyce, Canace, Alcyone, Pisidice and Perimede. By Diomede, Deioneus became the father of Cephalus, Actor, Aenetus, Phylacus, Asterodia and Philonis. After the death of his brother, Salmoneus, Deioneus took his daughter Tyro into his house, and gave her in marriage to Cretheus.
- Deioneus, the Perrhaebian father of Dia and father-in-law-to-be of Ixion, Deioneus was pushed by him into a bed of flaming coals so that Ixion wouldn't have to pay the bride price. Also known as Eioneus.
- Deion, father of Nisus, king of Megara. Otherwise, the latter was called the son of Pandion II or Ares.
- Deioneus, an Oeachalian prince as son of King Eurytus and Antiope or Antioche, and thus brother to Iole, Toxeus, Clytius, Didaeon and Iphitos. He married Perigune, daughter of Sinis, whose father was killed by Theseus.
- Deioneus, one of the sons of Heracles and Megara.

== See also ==
- Deioneus: Deon, Deion, Deone, Dion, Dione, Dionne
