= Dionisius =

Russian painter (c. 1440 – 1503/1508)

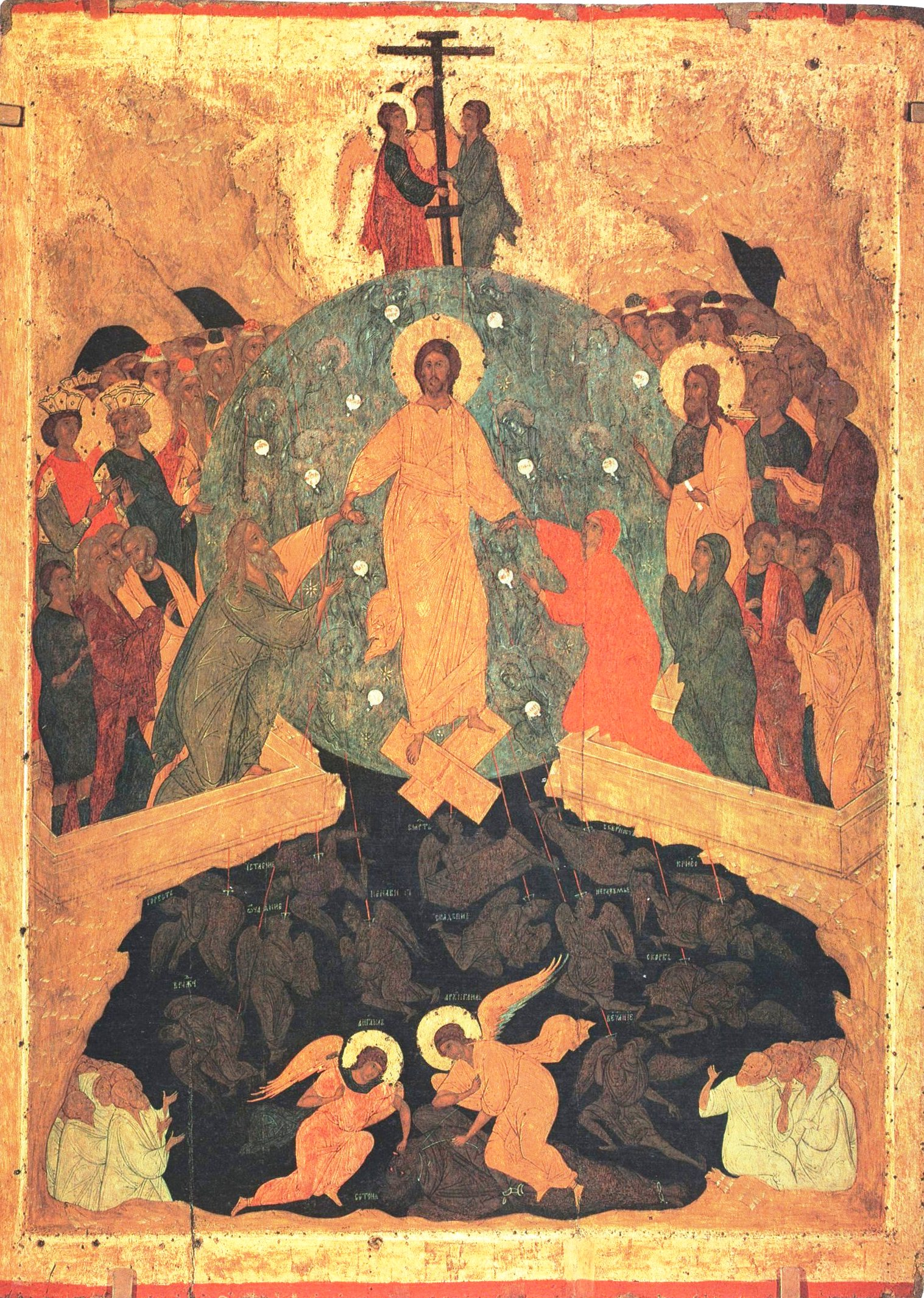
Icon representing Christ's Harrowing of Hell, from the Ferapontov Monastery

Dionisius (Russian: Диони́сий, romanized: Dionisy; c. 1440 – 1503/1508) was a Russian icon painter who was one of the most important representatives of the Moscow school of icon painting at the turn of the 15th and 16th centuries. He continued the traditions of Andrei Rublev. Dionisius also ran a successful network of workshops.

== Career ==
Dionisius was born around 1440. His first recorded works are the frescos in the Cathedral of the Nativity of the Virgin Mary in the Pafnutyev-Borovsky Monastery (1466–1467). His first important commission was a series of icons for the Cathedral of the Dormition in the Moscow Kremlin, executed in 1481. The figures on his icons are famously elongated, the hands and feet are diminutive, and the faces serene and peaceful. Some fragments of his original works have survived to this day, for instance the Adoration of the Magi, but most have been painted over. The Deesis tier that has survived is partly attributed to him, as well as the icons of the Russian Orthodox metropolitans Peter and Aleksey.

Dionisius's work has also been identified in the Ascension Monastery, the Joseph-Volokolamsk Monastery, the Pavlo-Obnorsky Monastery, and the Ferapontov Monastery. Among his many rich and notable patrons, Joseph of Volokolamsk alone commissioned him to paint more than 80 icons, primarily for the Joseph-Volokolamsk and Pavlo-Obnorsky cloisters.

The most comprehensive and the best preserved work of Dionisius is the monumental fresco painting of the Virgin Nativity Cathedral of the Ferapontov Monastery in Vologda Oblast (c. 1502–1503). The frescoes, depicting scenes from the life of the Virgin in singularly pure and gentle colours, are permeated with a solemn and festal mood.

The work at the Ferapontov was executed by Dionisius in collaboration with his sons and disciples, who continued a Dionisiesque tradition after the master's death. His son Feodosy painted the mural of Michael and Joshua before the battle of Jericho in the Cathedral of the Annunciation of the Moscow Kremlin in 1508. As his father did not take part in this important commission, it is thought that he had died shortly before that date. He died around 1503 or 1508.

== Legacy ==
Dionisius's career coincided with the conflict between Nilus of Sora (1433–1508) and Joseph of Volokolamsk (1439–1515) and their followers in the Russian Orthodox Church, known as the "non-possessors" and "possessors", respectively. According to Sergey Averintsev, Dionisius's art is "an unusual compromise, an attempt to combine the two elements which cannot be combined: an internal purity and an external ritualism".

He has been called the last great painter of medieval Russia, a view consistent with the belief that the spirituality of Russian icon painting declined as the views of Joseph of Volokolamsk gained dominance and the Russian state's triumphalism increased. During the same period, the Russian Orthodox Church worked to put an end to the iconoclastic tendencies in the heresies of the strigolniki and the Judaizers.

== Bibliography ==
- Riasanovsky, Nicholas V.; Steinberg, Mark D. (2019). A history of Russia (9th ed.). New York: Oxford University Press. ISBN 978-0190645588.
- Rock, Stella (2006). "The Russian Church". The Cambridge History of Christianity: Volume 5: Eastern Christianity. Cambridge University Press. doi:10.1017/CHOL9780521811132. ISBN 978-0-521-81113-2.
