= Denise (given name) =

- Pronunciation: /dəˈniːs/ də-NES or /dəˈniːz/ də-NEEZ
- Gender: Feminine

Origin
- Origin: Greek / Roman mythology
- Region of origin: France

Other names
- Related names: Dennis, Denis, Denny, Dennie, Denni, Denisa, Nisey

Denise, with several spelling variations, is a feminine given name derived from Dionysus the Greek god of wine.

== Feminine variants ==
- Deneece, Denice, Deniece, Denyse: English
- Denisa: Czech, Romanian, Russian, Slovak
- Denise: English, French, Portuguese
- Denisse: English, French
- Deniz: Turkish
- Dennet, Denote, Deonisia, Deonysia: Middle English
- Dinisia: Portuguese
- Dionycia, Dionis: Middle English
- Dionise: Old French (on St. Denise's burial site)
- Dionísia: Portuguese
- Dionisia: Middle English, Italian, Spanish
- Dionizja: Polish
- Dionysia: Greek (Διονυσία), Latin, Middle English
- Diot, Diota, Dye, Dyonese, Dyonisia, Dyonisya, Dyot, Dyota: Middle English

== Masculine variants ==
- Dénes: Hungarian
- Denis: English, French, German, Romanian, Slovak, Slovene, Czech, Russian (Денис), Serbo-Croatian (also Денис)
- Denijs: Middle Dutch
- Deniz: Turkish language
- Dêniz: Portuguese (Brazilian)
- Dennis: English, Dutch, German, Norwegian
- Denny: English
- Denys (Денис): Ukrainian
- Dinis, Diniz, Dionísio: Portuguese
- Dion: English, French (medieval diminutive), Greek (diminutive: Δίων)
- Dionigi: Italian
- Dionise: Romanian
- Dionisije (Дионисије): Serbian
- Dionisio: Italian, Spanish
- Dionisos (Դիոնիսոս): Armenian
- Dionizy: Polish
- Dionysios (Διονύσιος): Greek
- Dionýz: Slovak
- Dénes: Hungarian
- Donnchadh: Irish
- Dzianis (Дзяніс): Belarusian
- Genis (Генис): Udmurt

== Notable people named Denise ==
=== In television and film ===
- Denise Alexander (1939–2025), American actress
- Denise Baby, French film editor
- Denise Barbacena (born 1994), Filipina actress, singer and comedienne
- Denise Batcheff (1906–2000), French film editor and sound technician
- Denise Bellon (1902–1999), French photographer
- Denise Benoît (1919–1973), French actress and singer
- Denise Black (born 1958), English actress
- Denise Borino-Quinn (1964–2010), American actress
- Denise Bosc (1916–2002), French actress
- Denise Boutte (born 1982), American actress and model
- Denise Brosseau (1936–1986), Canadian actress
- Denise Bryer (1928–2021), British actress
- Denise Buckley (born 1945), British actress
- Denise Burse (born 1952), American actress
- Denise Capezza (born 1989), Italian actress
- Denise Clarke, Canadian dancer
- Denise LeClair Cobb, American former CNN and CNN Headline News anchor
- Denise Coffey (1936–2022), British actress, director and playwright
- Denise Colomb (1902–2004), French photographer
- Denise Crosby (born 1957), American actress
- Denise Darcel (1924–2011), French-American actress
- Denise D'Ascenzo (1958–2019), American television news anchorwoman
- Denise Del Vecchio (born 1954), Brazilian actress
- Denise Di Novi (born 1956), American film producer and director
- Denise Dowse (1958–2022), American actress and director
- Denise Drysdale (born 1948), Australian television personality and comedian
- Denise DuBarry (1956–2019), American actress and activist
- Denise Dumont (born 1955), Brazilian television and film actress
- Denise Fabre (born 1942), French television personality
- Denise Faro (born 1988), Italian singer and actress
- Denise Faye (born 1963), American actress and choreographer
- Denise Fernandes, Portuguese director
- Denise Filiatrault (born 1931), Canadian actress and director
- Denise Fraga (born 1964), Brazilian actress
- Denise Fujiwara, Canadian dancer and choreographer
- Denise Gagnon (1936–2024), Canadian actress
- Denise Garrido (born 1986), Canadian model and beauty pageant titleholder
- Denise Glaser (1920–1983), French television presenter
- Denise Gordy (born 1949), American actress and singer
- Denise Gough (born 1980), Irish actress
- Denise Grey (1896–1996), Italian-French actress
- Denise Gyngell (born 1961), Welsh singer and actress
- Denise Joaquin, Filipina actress
- Denise Keller (born 1982), Singaporean model and MTV Asia host
- Denise Kiernan (born 1968), American journalist, producer and author
- Denise Laurel (born 1987), Filipina actress and singer
- Denise Legeay (1898–1968), French actress
- Denise Lor (1929–2015), American actress
- Denise Maerker (born 1965), Mexican journalist and television news anchor
- Denise McCluggage (1927–2015), American journalist
- Denise Michele (born 1953), American actress and model
- Denise Miller (born 1963), American actress
- Denise Morelle (1925–1984), Canadian actress
- Denise Nicholas (born 1944), American actress, author, and activist
- Denise Nickerson (1957–2019), American actress
- Denise O'Donoghue (born 1955), British television producer
- Denise Pelletier (1923–1976), Canadian actress
- Denise Pence (born 1949), American actress
- Denise Perrier (born 1935), French actress, former model and beauty queen
- Denise Provence (1921–2011), French actor
- Denise Richards (born 1971), American actress
- Denise Robert, Canadian film producer
- Denise Roberts, Australian actress and director
- Denise Robertson (1932–2016), British writer and broadcaster
- Denise Scott (born 1955), Australian comedian
- Denise Stapley (born 1971), American television personality and sex therapist
- Denise Sullivan (born 1961), American music journalist
- Denise Camillia Tan (born 1992), Malaysian-based Singaporean actress
- Denise Tantucci (born 1997), Italian actress
- Denise Uyehara, American performance artist, director and writer
- Denise van Outen (born 1974), English actress, singer and TV presenter
- Denise Vasi (born 1983), American fashion model and actress
- Denise Vernac (1916–1984), French actress
- Denise Welch (born 1958), English actress and television presenter
- Denise Williamson (born 1983), American actress
- Denise Yarde, British sound engineer
- Denise Zich (born 1975), German actress and singer
- Denise Zimba (born 1988), South African actress, singer, dancer and presenter

=== In music ===
- Denise Belfon (born 1968), Trinidad and Tobago singer and dancer
- Denise Bestman (born 2000), American vocalist
- Denise Chaila, Irish-Zambian hip-hop singer
- Denise Clark-Bradford (born 1953), American gospel singer
- Denise Djokic (born 1980), Canadian cellist
- Denise Donatelli, American jazz singer
- Denise Duval (1921–2016), French soprano
- Denise Ho (born 1977), singer from Hong Kong
- Denise Jannah (born 1956), Dutch jazz singer
- Denise Julia (born 2002), Filipino singer-songwriter
- Denise Kelly (born 1954), Irish harpist and composer
- Denise LaSalle (1934–2018), American singer
- Denise Launay (1906–1993), French organist and musicologist
- Denise Lor (1929–2015), American singer
- Denise Marsa, singer-songwriter and mentor
- Denise Massé (1946–2022), Canadian pianist and vocalist
- Denise McCann (born 1948), American-Canadian singer-songwriter
- Denise Murray (1964–2020), Canadian female country music singer
- Denise Narcisse-Mair (1940–2010), Canadian musician
- Denise Nolan (born 1952), Irish singer
- Denise Orme (1885–1960), English music hall singer, actress and musician
- Denise Pearson (born 1968), English singer-songwriter and lead singer of British pop group Five Star
- Denise Restout (1915–2004), French keyboard teacher
- Denise Eisenberg Rich (born 1944), American singer-songwriter
- Denise Roger (1924–2005), French composer
- Denise Rosenthal (born 1990), Chilean singer and songwriter
- Denise Scharley (1917–2011), French opera singer
- Denise Soriano-Boucherit (1916–2006), French woman cellist
- Denise Stefanie (born 1988), Mexican singer-songwriter
- Denise Stiff, personal manager
- Denise Tillmanns (born 1984), German singer
- Denise Tolkowsky, English-born pianist and composer

=== Sportspeople ===
- Denise Aiolupotea (born 1998), Samoan rugby union player
- Denise Altmann (born 1987), Austrian ice hockey forward
- Denise Annetts (born 1964), Australian cricketer
- Denise Beckwith (born 1977), Australian Paralympic swimmer
- Denise Bender (born 1959), American soccer player
- Denise Benning (born 1967), Canadian pair skater
- Denise Betsema (born 1993), Dutch cyclist
- Denise Biellmann (born 1962), Swiss professional figure skater
- Denise Boyd (born 1952), Australian sprinter
- Denise Boyer-Merdich (born 1962), American soccer player
- Denise Bral, Belgian cyclist
- Denise Burton (born 1956), British cyclist
- Denise Carriere (born 1970), Canadian softball player
- Denise Carter (born 1950), American tennis player
- Denise Castle (born 1971), English Muay Thai fighter
- Denise Castro (born 2003), Mexican soccer player
- Denise Cesky (born 1976), Austrian sailor
- Denise Christensen, American diver
- Denise Cojuangco (born 1961), Filipino equestrian
- Denise Cook, New Zealand Paralympian athlete
- Denise Cooper (born 1960), Australian sprint and marathon canoeist
- Denise Cronin, Irish camogie player
- Denise Curry (born 1959), American former basketball player
- Denise Dillon (born 1973), American basketball coach
- Denise Dupont (born 1984), Danish curler
- Denise Dy (born 1989), Filipino tennis player
- Denise Emerson (born 1960), Australian cricketer
- Denise Favart (1923–2016), French figure skater
- Denise Feierabend (born 1989), Swiss alpine skier
- Denise Frick (born 1980), South African chess player
- Denise Goddard (1945–2023), British artistic gymnast
- Denise Gomes (born 1999), Brazilian mixed martial artist
- Denise Grahl (born 1993), German Paralympic swimmer
- Denise Guénard (1934–2017), French track and field athlete
- Denise Hallion (born 1966), South African dressage rider
- Denise Hampson (born 1978), Welsh female former track cyclist
- Denise Hanke (born 1989), German volleyball player
- Denise Hannema (born 1990), Dutch cricketer
- Denise Herrmann-Wick (born 1988), German cross-country skier
- Denise Hinrichs (born 1987), German shot putter
- Denise Infante (born 1986), Chilean field hockey player
- Denise Ireta (born 1980), Mexican footballer
- Denise Johns (born 1978), British beach volleyball player
- Denise Karbon (born 1980), Italian alpine skier
- Denise Kielholtz (born 1989), Dutch mixed martial arts fighter
- Denise Klecker (born 1972), German field hockey player
- Denise Kögl (born 1988), Austrian figure skater
- Denise Kramer-Scholer (1910–1993), Swiss fencer
- Denise Langford (born 1953), Australian swimmer
- Denise Lemaire (born 1956), Canadian handball player
- Denise Lewis (born 1972), British heptathlete
- Denise Lim (born 1991), Singaporean sailor
- Denise Long Rife, American basketball player
- Denise Lyttle (born 1967), Irish sailor
- Denise Marston-Smith (born 1977), British field hockey player
- Denise Martin (born 1959), Australian cricketer
- Denise Masino, American bodybuilder
- Denise Mattioli (born 1952), Brazilian volleyball player
- Denise Mueller-Korenek, American cyclist
- Denise Newlove (born 1973), New Zealand-born Scottish international cricketer
- Denise Norton (1933–?), Australian swimmer
- Denise Nowlan (born 1971), Canadian curler
- Denise O'Brien (1937–2024), Australian fencer
- Denise O'Connor (born 1935), American Olympic fencer
- Denise O'Sullivan (born 1994), Irish footballer
- Denise Ouabangui (born 1968), Central African Republic sprinter
- Denise Page, New Zealand lawn bowler
- Denise Parker (born 1973), American archer
- Denise Parmentiers (1915–1969), Belgian gymnast
- Denise Parnell (born 1960), British tennis player
- Denise Parruque (born 2003), Mozambican sailor
- Denise Payet (born 2001), English table tennis player
- Denise Pesantes (born 1988), Ecuadorian footballer
- Denise Pimpini (born 1995), Italian curler
- Denise Prins (born 1983), Dutch cricketer
- Denise Reddy (born 1970), American soccer coach
- Denise Reid (born 1967), South African cricketer
- Denise Rennex, Australian rower
- Denise Rojas (born 1995), Chilean field hockey player
- Denise Roth (born 1988), German speed skater
- Denise Rutkowski, American bodybuilder
- Denise Schilte-Brown (born 1974), Canadian soccer coach
- Denise Schindler (born 1985), German Paralympic cyclist
- Denise Simon (born 1983), German professional golfer
- Denise Smith, British wheelchair racer
- Denise Soesilo (born 1987), German ice hockey player
- Denise Spencer (1929–1998), Australian swimmer
- Denise Strebig (born 1960), American golfer
- Denise Sundberg (born 1990), Swedish footballer
- Denise Taylor, American basketball coach
- Denise Thiémard (born 1960), Swiss javelin thrower
- Denise Thomas (born 1979), English footballer
- Denise van Deventer (born 1990), Dutch cricketer
- Denise Wescott, American lacrosse coach
- Denise Weyers (1942–2022), South African cricketer
- Denise Yeung, Hong Kong racing driver

=== Politicians ===
- Denise Allen (1953–2022), Australian politician
- Denise Andrews (born 1959), American politician from Massachusetts
- Denise Harper Angel (born 1953), American politician
- Denise Apt (1929–2014), American politician from Kansas
- Denise Bastide (1916–1952), French politician
- Denise Batters (born 1970), Canadian politician
- Denise Bauer (born 1964), American diplomat
- Denise Baum, American politician from Montana
- Denise Beaudoin (born 1949), Canadian businessperson
- Denise Bellamy, Canadian judge
- Denise Bindschedler-Robert (1920–2008), Swiss international lawyer
- Denise Brewer (born 1966), American politician
- Denise Bronzetti (born 1972), Sammarinese politician
- Denise Bucumi-Nkurunziza (born 1969), Burundian ordained minister who was First Lady of Burundi
- Denise Cacheux (1932–2023), French politician
- Denise Carrier-Perreault (born 1946), Canadian politician
- Denise L. Carter, American government official
- Denise J. Casper (born 1968), American judge
- Denise Charles-Pemberton, Dominican politician
- Denise Coates (born 1967), English businesswoman
- Denise Cote (born 1946), American judge
- Denise Coyle (born 1953), American Republican Party politician
- Denise Crosswhite Hader (born 1965), American politician
- Denise Daley, Jamaican politician
- Denise De Chazal (1887–1971), Mauritian politician
- Denise DeDe-Poulin, American politician
- Denise Dittrich (born 1957), American politician from Minnesota
- Denise Donlon (born 1956), Canadian television executive
- Denise Drace-Brownell, American businessperson
- Denise Dresser (born 1963), Mexican political scientist
- Denise Driehaus (born 1963), American politician from Ohio
- Denise Jones Ennett, American politician
- Denise Everhart (born 1954), American politician from Kansas
- Denise Tourover Ezekiel (1903–1980), American lawyer
- Denise Frossard (born 1950), Brazilian politician
- Denise Garlick, American state legislator
- Denise Garner (born 1956), American politician from Arkansas
- Denise George (born 1959), U.S. Virgin Islands politician
- Denise Ginollin (1907–1961), French politician
- Denise Goldsworthy, Australian business executive
- Denise Goupil (1931–2017), American lawyer
- Denise Grimsley (born 1959), American politician
- Denise Harlow (1970–2026), American politician from Maine
- Denise Hayman, American politician
- Denise Holt (born 1949), British ambassador
- Denise Page Hood, American judge
- Denise Ilitch (born 1955), American businessperson
- Denise Joy, American politician
- Denise Juneau (born 1967), American lawyer
- Denise Leblanc-Bantey (1949–1999), Canadian politician
- Denise Lee (born 1970), New Zealand politician
- Denise Posse-Blanco Lindberg, American judge
- Denise Loop (born 1994), German politician
- Denise Majette (born 1955), American politician from Georgia
- Denise McBride, Northern Irish judge and former barrister
- Denise McGill (born 1946), Australian politician
- Denise Mentzer, American politician from Michigan
- Denise M. Mercherson, American lawyer
- Denise Merrill (born 1948), American politician from Connecticut
- Denise Mitchell (born 1976), Irish politician
- Denise Moreno Ducheny (born 1952), American politician
- Denise Moriguchi, American businesswoman
- Denise Morrisey (born 1964), American lobbyist
- Denise Morrison (born 1954), American business executive
- Denise Nappier (born 1951), American politician
- Denise Natali, American political scientist
- Denise Nurse (born 1976), British entrepreneur, lawyer and television presenter
- Denise Nyakéru Tshisekedi (born 1967), First Lady of the Congo
- Denise O'Donnell, American politician and lawyer
- Denise Pascal (born 1940), Chilean politician
- Denise Pessôa (born 1983), Brazilian politician
- Denise Peterson-Rafuse, Canadian politician
- Denise Phua (born 1959), Singaporean politician
- Denise Poirier-Rivard (born 1941), Canadian politician
- Denise Provost (born 1951), American politician from Massachusetts
- Denise Ricciardi (born 1961), American politician
- Denise Roberts (born 1973), American politician
- Denise Robinson (born 1948), South African politician
- Denise Roche (born 1963), New Zealand politician
- Denise Turner Roth, American government official
- Denise Savoie (born 1943), Canadian politician
- Denise Sinankwa, Burundian politician
- Denise Smith, American politician
- Denise Smyler, American lawyer
- Denise Stillman (1971–2018), American businesswoman
- Denise Swan (born 1947), Australian politician
- Denise Tepler (born 1956), American politician
- Denise Trudel (born 1955), Canadian politician
- Denise Tsoiafatt Angus, Tobagonian politician
- Denise Doring VanBuren, American civic leader
- Denise Verreault, Canadian businesswoman
- Denise Villalobos, American politician
- Denise Walsh, American political scientist
- Denise Woollard (born 1946), Canadian politician
- Denise DeBartolo York, American businesswoman
- Denise S. Young (born 1955), American tech executive
- Denise Yue, Hong Kong politician

=== In other fields ===
- Denise Aberle, American radiologist and oncologist
- Denise Affonço (born 1944), Cambodian civil servant
- Denise Ajayi-Williams, Nigerian-American businesswoman
- Denise Albe-Fessard (1916–2003), French neuroscientist
- Denise Mary Allen, Australian Antarctic meteorology observer and forecaster
- Denise P. Barlow (1950–2017), British geneticist
- Denise Barrett-Baxendale, director of Everton Football Club
- Denise Barthomeuf (1934–2004), French chemist
- Denise Bennetts (born 1953), British architect
- Denise Bernot (1922–2016), French academic
- Denise Bidot (born 1986), American plus-size fashion model
- Denise Bloch (1916–1945), French espionage agent
- Denise Bode, American energy expert
- Denise Bombardier (1941–2023), Canadian journalist, essayist, novelist and media personality
- Denise Boucher (1935–2025), Canadian writer
- Denise Bower, British professor
- Denise Bradley (1942–2020), Australian academic
- Denise Breitburg, American marine ecologist
- Denise Brice (1928–2025), French paleontologist
- Denise Broadley (1913–2007), British artist
- Denise Brunkus, American illustrator
- Denise Cai, American neuroscientist and researcher
- Denise Caruso, American journalist and analyst
- Denise Mary Champion, Aboriginal Australian deacon
- Denise Chávez (born 1948), American novelist
- Denise Chong (born 1953), Canadian economist and writer
- Denise Cocquerillat (1918–1999), French archaeologist and Assyriologist
- Denise Coia (1952–2020), Scottish psychiatrist and mental health advocate
- Denise Copland, New Zealand artist
- Denise Cox, American petroleum geologist
- Denise Cronenberg (1938–2020), Canadian costume designer
- Denise Danks, British writer
- Denise Darvall (1942–1967), South African organ donor
- Denise Dearing, American ecological physiologist and mammalogist
- Denise Deegan, English novelist and playwright
- Denise Deegan (Irish author) (born 1966), Irish screenwriter and author
- Denise Desautels (born 1945), Canadian poet and writer
- Denise Domenach-Lallich (1924–2020), French resistance member
- Denise Dorrance (born 1958), American-born cartoonist
- Denise Duchateau, French artist
- Denise Duhamel (born 1961), American poet
- Denise Epoté (born 1954), Cameroonian journalist
- Denise Faustman, American immunologist
- Denise Ferguson, New Zealand bishop
- Denise Ferreira da Silva, Brazilian philosopher
- Denise Fleming (born 1950), American writer
- Denise Galloway, American microbiologist
- Denise Giardina (born 1951), American writer
- Denise Gottfredson, American criminologist
- Denise Green, Australian artist
- Denise O'Neil Green, American academic
- Denise Hamilton, American novelist
- Denise L. Herzing, zoologist
- Denise Hines, American psychologist
- Denise Hinkel, American plasma physicist
- Denise Hinton, American nurse
- Denise Holstein (1927–2024), French holocaust survivor
- Denise Houphouët-Boigny, Ivorian academic and diplomat
- Denise Hunter, American romance writer
- Denise J. Jamieson, American gynecologist
- Denise Jefferson (1944–2010), American dance educator
- Denise Jodelet, French social psychologist
- Denise Kandel (born 1933), American medical sociologist and epidemiologist
- Denise Kingsmill, Baroness Kingsmill (born 1947), British baroness
- Denise Kirschner, American mathematical biologist and immunologist
- Denise Kum, New Zealand artist
- Denise Landis, British-born American food writer, editor, cookbook author and recipe tester and developer
- Denise Lester (1909–1982), British teacher
- Denise L'Estrange-Corbet, New Zealand fashion designer and businesswoman
- Denise Levertov (1923–1977), American poet
- Denise Lievesley, British social statistician
- Denise Louis-Bar (1914–1999), Belgian neuropsychiatrist
- Denise Low, American poet
- Denise Manahan-Vaughan (born 1965), Irish neuroscientist and neurophysiologist
- Denise Masson (1901–1994), French islamologist
- Denise McAdam, Scottish celebrity hairdresser
- Denise Mercedes (born 1991), American plus-size fashion model
- Denise Meunier (1918–2022), French schoolteacher and resistant
- Denise Millet (1933–2020), French comic book artist
- Denise Mina (born 1966), Scottish crime writer and playwright
- Denise M. Monack, American microbiologist
- Denise Montell, American biologist
- Denise Moore (1876–1911), aviation pioneer
- Denise Morcombe (born 1960), Australian child safety advocate
- Denise Morel (born 1946), French writer and psychiatrist
- Denise Murrell, American curator
- Denise Naville, French writer and translator
- Denise Norris, American transgender activist
- Denise Okuda, computer, scenic and video supervisor
- Denise Oliver-Velez (born 1947), American professor, contributing editor, activist and community organizer
- Denise R. Osborn (born 1948), Australian and British economist
- Denise C. Park (1951-2026), American neuroscientist
- Denise Paulme (1909–1998), French ethnologist and anthropologist
- Denise Pelletier, American sculptor
- Denise Platt (born 1945), British civil servant
- Denise Pumain (born 1946), French geographer
- Denise Quiñones (born 1980), Miss Universe 2001 from Puerto Rico
- Denise René (1913–2012), French art dealer
- Denise Riley, English poet and philosopher
- Denise Robins (1897–1985), English novelist
- Denise Rocha (born 1983), Brazilian model, lawyer, and a former parliamentary adviser
- Denise Rose (1970–2004), British soldier
- Denise Rousseau (born 1951), American psychologist
- Denise Rudberg (born 1971), Swedish author
- Denise Ryner, Canadian curator
- Denise Schmandt-Besserat (born 1933), French-American archaeologist and retired professor
- Denise Sheer, professor of human genetics
- Denise Shull (born 1959), American neuro-economist
- Denise Sigogneau-Russell, French paleontologist
- Denise Spellberg, American scholar
- Denise Stephens, American astronomer
- Denise Stoklos (born 1950), Brazilian playwright
- Denise M. Stone, American geologist
- Denise Swanson, American mystery writer
- Denise Sweet, American poet
- Denise Vega, American writer
- Denise Vernay (1924–2013), French resistant fighter
- Denise Verret, American zookeeper
- Denise Voïta (1928–2008), Swiss painter, designer, lithographer and tapestry designer
- Denise Wallace, American jeweler and member of the Sugpiaq tribe
- Denise Wilkinson, American Roman Catholic leader
- Denise Wilson, New Zealand health academic
- Denise Wren (1891–1979), British potter and craftsperson
- Denise Hsien Wu, Taiwanese neuroscientist
- Denise Wyss (born 1965), Swiss Old Catholic priestess and counselor

=== Disambiguation ===
- Denise Austin, multiple people
- Denise Brown, multiple people
- Denise Campbell, multiple people
- Denise Johnson, multiple people
- Denise Jones, multiple people
- Denise Lopez, multiple people
- Denise Newman, multiple people
- Denise Ramsden, multiple people

== Deniece ==
- Deniece Williams (born 1951), American singer

== Denese ==
- Denese Becker (born 1937), Guatemalan survivor of the Rio Negro massacre
- Denese Oates (born 1955), Australian sculptor

== Denyce ==
- Denyce Graves (born 1964), American opera singer
- Denyce Lawton (born 1978), American actress and model

== Fictional characters ==
- Denise, a character in The Muppets who is Kermit the Frog's new significant other
- Denise Fox, on the British soap opera EastEnders
- Denise Huxtable, on the sitcom The Cosby Show and its spin-off A Different World
- Denise (The Big Bang Theory)

== See also ==
- Deniz (given name), pronounced similarly in Turkish
- Marie-Denise
