= Louis Gardet =

French Catholic priest, sociologist and historian

Louis Gardet (15 August 1904, in Toulouse – 17 July 1986) was a French Roman Catholic religious brother and historian. As an author he was an expert in Islamic culture and sociology who had a sympathetic view of Islam as a religion. He considered himself "a Christian philosopher of cultures".

== Biography ==
His real name was André Brottier and he is known under three identities that correspond to three phases of his life:

- Under the name of André Harlaire, he published some texts in literary magazines.
- As Frère André-Marie, he was an important early member of the Little Brothers of Jesus congregation, which he joined after its 1933 foundation, receiving strong spiritual and intellectual support from his friend Louis Massignon.
- Under the name of Louis Gardet he devoted himself to the research of the Islamic religion in the last part of his life, becoming an authority on the subject.

As a philosopher he espoused the Thomist thought. Youakim Moubarac, Jacques Jomier and Denise Masson were among his numerous disciples.

== Published works ==
Louis Gardet wrote many books. His main works are:

- Introduction à la théologie musulmane, essai de théologie comparée, by Louis Gardet and Rev. George Anawati, with an introduction by Louis Massignon, Vrin, 1948 1946
- La pensée religieuse d'Avicenne, Paris, Vrin, 1951.
- Expériences mystiques en terres non chrétiennes, Paris, Alsatia, 1953.
- La cité musulmane, vie sociale et politique, Paris, Vrin, 1954.
- L'Islam, by Youakim Moubarac, Rev. Jacques Jomier, Louis Gardet and Rev. Anawati, Saint-Alban-Leysse (Savoie), Collège théologique dominicain, 1956.
- Connaître l'islam, Paris, Fayard, 1958.
- Mystique musulmane. Aspects et tendances, expériences et techniques, by Rev. Anawati & Louis Gardet, Paris, Vrin, 1961
- L'islam. Religion, et communauté, Paris, Desclée De Brouwer, 1967.
- Dieu et la destinée de l'homme, Paris : J. Vrin, 1967 ("Les grands problèmes de la théologie musulmane")
- Les hommes de l'islam, approche des mentalités, Paris, Hachette, 1977
- L'Islam : hier, demain, by Mohammed Arkoun & Louis Gardet, Paris, Buchet-Chastel, 1978
- Louis Gardet also took part in La passion de Hussayn Ibn Mansûr an-Hallâj, the posthumous edition of Louis Massignon's work, 1975.
