= Dennis Green (disambiguation) =

Dennis Green (1949–2016) was an American football coach. Other notable people with this name include:

- Dennis Green (canoeist) (1931–2018), Australian canoer
- Dennis Howard Green (1922–2008), English professor of German
- Dennis Green (politician), American politician

== See also ==
- Dennis Greene (disambiguation)
- Denise Green (born 1946), Australian painter
- Denise O'Neil Green (fl. 2000s–2020s), American academic and academic administrator
