= Marie-Denise =

Marie-Denise is a French feminine given name. Notable people with the name include:

- Marie-Denise Douyon (born 1961), Canadian painter
- Marie-Denise Fabien Jean-Louis (born 1944), Haitian physician and politician
- Marie Denise Pelletier (born 1960), Canadian singer
- Marie-Denise Villers (1774–1821), French painter
- Marie-Denise Vriot (1742–1817), French stage actress

== See also ==
- Marie (given name)
- Denise (given name)
