= Houphouët-Boigny (disambiguation) =

Félix Houphouët-Boigny (1905–1993) was the first President of Côte d'Ivoire.

Houphouët-Boigny may also refer to:

- Denise Houphouët-Boigny, Ivorian academic and diplomat
- Marie-Thérèse Houphouët-Boigny (born 1930), former First Lady of Côte d'Ivoire; current philanthropist
- Félix Houphouët-Boigny Peace Prize, established in 1990 as an award for individuals or institutions
- Coupe Houphouët-Boigny, a football competition in Côte d'Ivoire
- Stade Félix Houphouët-Boigny, a stadium in Abidjan, Côte d'Ivoire
- Félix-Houphouët-Boigny International Airport, an international airport in Abidjian, Cǒte d'Ivoire
