= Elizabeth Langley =

Dancer and choreographer (b. 1933)

- Born: April 13, 1933 (age 93)
- Known for: Dance
- Movement: Dance, Contemporary Dance
- Awards: Canada Council for the Arts Jacqueline Lemieux Prize
- Website: http://elizabethlangley.org/

Elizabeth Langley CM is a performer, choreographer, teacher, dramaturge, creation & rehearsal director. She is the designer of a BFA Contemporary Dance Degree, in the Contemporary Dance department at Concordia University, Montreal, Canada.

== Life and career ==
Elizabeth Langley was born in Melbourne, Australia in 1933. Early dance education occurred at the Studio of Creative Dancing in Melbourne.

Her father, indicated to her, at a young age, "If you can turn your passion into your profession, you will be the happiest person in the world."

From 1960 to 1965 she lived in New York, where she trained in the Martha Graham technique at Graham's studios on East 63rd Street, and experienced the burgeoning modern and post-modern American dance scene. She then moved to Ottawa, Ontario. She undertook a number of jobs: opening a dress boutique, serving as manager of the Café Le Hibou Coffee House, where performers Josh White Jr., Odetta, James Cotton, and Bruce Cockburn headlined, teaching dance at the Strathmere Farm summer day camp in North Gower, Ontario. She taught a Movement for Actors course at the University of Ottawa in the fall of 1975. Among her students was Christopher House, who said, "She always has a question that she's grappling with. This means constantly setting challenges for yourself. There must be the feeling that there is something more. Step back and shake it up!"

In 1979, at Concordia University, she designed a university dance degree program geared to training choreographers, as well as technique, became the first chair of the Department of Modern Dance, inaugurated in the 1980/81 academic year. It was renamed the Department of Contemporary Dance in 1987. She describes the development of the program as a key experience. Concentrated study allowed students to create their own choreographic work and teachers did not impose their own technique or develop their work on the cohort. Among those who graduated from the program include, Pierre-Paul Savoie, Jeff Hall (dancer), Jacques Brochu, Isabelle Choinière, Noam Gagnon, Florence Figols, Thea Patterson Sasha Kleinplatz Andrew Tay and Ireni Stamou.

After studying in Amsterdam, at the School of New Dance Development, she retired in 1997 to develop her own style of physical theatre.

On her return to Canada in January 1997, she became involved with various projects for companies and solo artists in Canada - assistant director for Maxine Heppner, studio consultant for Denise Fujiwara, and dramaturge to Sashar Zarif. Langley sees the dramaturge as a "mentor, a person who helps a choreographer reach clarity about his or her choreographic expression by responding to the emerging work from the position of an informed ‘first spectator.’ Langley operates from a neutral position, in which the dramaturg attempts to leave no artistic imprint on the work.

In 1997, she received the Jacqueline Lemieux Prize, a Canada Council for the Arts award recognizing a dance professional's exceptional contribution to the dance milieu in Canada.

At a theatre festival in Turkey, she met the Australian theatre director Paul Rainsford Towner, head of the troupe Chapel of Change. Together they created Langley's solo one hour multi-media performance, Journal of Peddle Dreams (2003). Inspired by the life and writing of Australian writer Eve Langley, the production directed Towner, is cited as "magnifique"

== Awards and nominations ==
Canada Council for the Arts Jacqueline Lemieux Prize, 1997

In 2020, she was appointed as a member of the Order of Canada.
