= J. D. Landis =

American author

- Born: James David Landis; June 30, 1942 (age 84); Springfield, Massachusetts, U.S.
- Education: Yale College
- Occupation: Author
- Spouse: Denise Landis
- Parent(s): Edward Landis; Eve Saltman

James David Landis (born June 30, 1942) is an American author and a former publisher and editor in chief of William Morrow and Company.

== Early life and career ==
Landis was born in Springfield, Massachusetts. He is the son of Russian/Polish Jewish parents Eve (Saltman), a teacher, and Edward Landis, a lawyer and amateur banjo player. He was educated in Springfield public schools, where he played football and was captain of the tennis team and won the Williams College Book Prize; and Yale College, from which he graduated in 1964, magna cum laude and a junior-year Phi Beta Kappa and where he wrote for The Yale Record, a humor magazine. While in high school he earned spending money playing the alto saxophone and clarinet in a jazz dance quartet.

Landis became a book editor in New York City in 1966, for one year at Abelard-Schuman and for the next 24 years at William Morrow and Company, where he advanced from Editor to Senior Vice-president, Publisher and editor-in-chief. As a book editor, he won the PEN/Roger Klein Award for Editing in 1973 and the Advocate Humanitarian Award in 1977 for his contributions to the advancement of gay writing and publishing. He retired from publishing in 1991.

The writers he edited and/or published included Robert Pirsig, Leroi Jones, Ken Follett, Pamela Des Barres, Nicholas Delbanco, James Clavell, Mick Fleetwood, Jacqueline Susann, Tariq Ali, Morris West, Sidney Sheldon, Harry Crews, John Irving, Salvador Dalí, William Fifield, Whitley Streiber and Patricia Nell Warren.

His books include Lying in Bed, which won the Morton Dauwen Zabel Award from the American Academy of Arts and Letters, Longing, which was a New York Times Notable Book, The Taking, which was published in paperback under the title Artist of the Beautiful, The Last Day, and Dagny: The Life and Death of Dagny Juel as Narrated by Her Lover W. E., which is available only in Polish translation as Dagny, Życie I Śmierć (Dagny: Life and Death). He also published a book of poetry for children, Cars on Mars and 49 Other Poems for Kids on Earth.

== Personal life ==
J. D. Landis is married to Denise Landis, a longtime recipe tester for The New York Times and the author of multiple cookbooks.

== Works ==
- The Sisters Impossible (1979, Knopf; ISBN 9780394941905 / 1984, Bantam; ISBN 9780553243888 / 1990, Random House Books for Young Readers; ISBN 9780679802198)
- Daddy's Girl (1984, William Morrow & Co; ISBN 9780688027636 / 1985, Simon Pulse; ISBN 9780671558239)
- Love's Detective (1984, Bantam; ISBN 9780553245295)
- Joey and the Girls (1987, Bantam; ISBN 9780553264159)
- The Band Never Dances (1989, Harper & Row; ISBN 9780060237219 / 1993, HarperCollins; ISBN 9780064470759, 1993, HarperCollins; ISBN 9780060237226)
- Looks Aren't Everything (1990, Delacorte Books for Young Readers; ISBN 9780553058475 / 1991, Starfire; ISBN 9780553288605)
- Cars on Mars and 49 Other Poems for Kids on Earth, with illustrations by Denise Landis (2008, Publishing Works; ISBN 978-1933002620)
- Lying in Bed (1995, Algonquin; ISBN 978-1565120686 / 1997, PHOENIX; ISBN 978-0575400757)
- Longing (2000, Houghton Mifflin Harcourt; ISBN 978-0151004539 / 2001, Ballantine Books; ISBN 978-0345447210)
- The Taking (2003, Ballantine; ISBN 978-0345450067 / 2005, Ballantine, as Artist of the Beautiful; ISBN 978-0345450074)
- The Last Day (2009, Steerforth; ISBN 978-1586421656)
- Dagny, Życie I Śmierć (Dagny: Life and Death) (2013, Bukowy Las; ISBN 978-8362478569)
