= Temitope Ajayi =

Nigerian businesswoman

Amina Temitope Ajayi
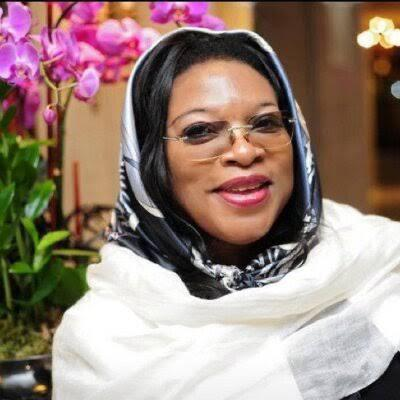
- Born: Lagos, Nigeria
- Citizenship: Nigerian
- Occupation: Businesswoman
- Notable work: The founder and CEO of the Nigerian American Agricultural Empowerment Program (NAAEP)
- Relatives: Denise Mobolaji Ajayi-Williams

Amina Temitope Ajayi is a US-based Nigerian businesswoman and accountant. A former president of the All Nigerian American Congress (ANAC), her advocacy on issues concerning Nigerians in Diaspora has earned her media attention as well as dubbed "Mama Diaspora".

Ajayi is the founder and CEO of the Nigerian American Agricultural Empowerment Program (NAAEP), an organisation that engages in the agricultural empowerment of local farmers, women and young adults in Nigeria. In 2010 she was known to have called on the Nigerian government to reduce the interest rates on loans to farmers in order to boost the agricultural sector. Ajayi is a goodwill ambassador of the US states of Arkansas and Maryland. She was a delegate at the 2014 Nigeria National Conference where she represented the National Council of Women Societies (NCWS) in Nigeria and served in the Confab's Committee on Agriculture.

== Career ==
From 1991 to 1993, Ajayi was appointed as the special assistant to the deputy governor of Lagos State, Alhaja Sinatu Aderoju Ojukutu. Ajayi played an active role in the Better Life for Rural Women project sponsored by the then First Lady of Nigeria, Maryam Babangida and was a delegate for the International Women's Conference held in Morocco and London. She moved to the US in 1996, however she returned later.

Ajayi was the former National Coordinator of Goodluck Support Group (GSG) USA. She congratulated Muhammadu Buhari after the 2015 presidential election, and also praised former president Goodluck Jonathan for becoming the first incumbent head of state in Nigeria to lose an election and accepted defeat peacefully.

== Philanthropy ==
Ajayi advocated for "One Million Goodluck Housing Programme" for the Diasporas in collaboration with the Federal Mortgage Bank of Nigeria. With the recent passing of the bill establishing the Diaspora Commission, Ajayi called on President Muhammadu Buhari to appoint credible individuals from the diaspora into the commission to ensure its success.

Ajayi is the Honorable Chair of the Global Connections for Women foundation (GC4W), an approved US non-profit organization that believes in all women and youth and their right to create new opportunities for themselves and their communities.

== Recognitions ==
For her service to African communities in the US, Ajayi was awarded the President's Volunteer Service Award by President George W. Bush.

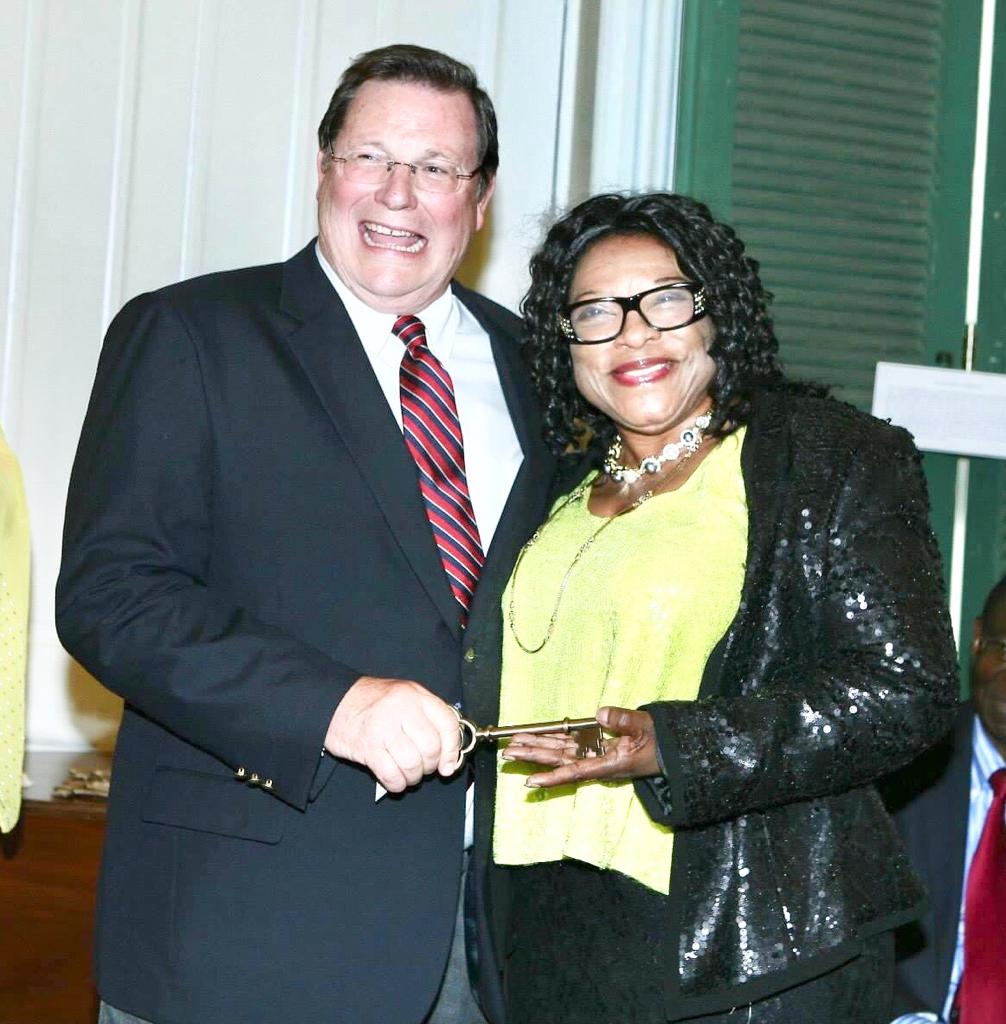
Chief Temitope Ajayi presented the "key to the city" of Little Rock, Arkansas from mayor Mark Stodola

In 2013, Governor Mike Beebe conferred an honorary citizenship of Arkansas on Ajayi alongside Aliko Dangote, Governor Rabiu Kwankwaso of Kano State, Akinwunmi Adesina, Tajudeen Gbadamosi, Ade Adefuye, Julius Okojie, among others.

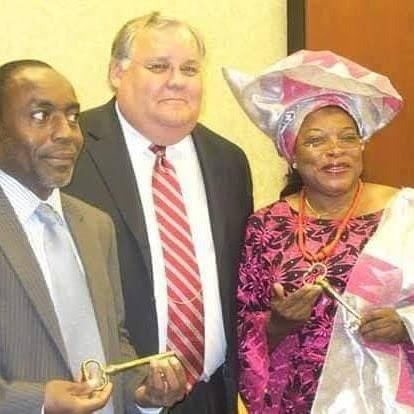
Ajayi & Amb. Ibrahim Auwalu received Key to the City of Dyersville from Mayor James Heavens (centre)

She was appointed the Goodwill Ambassador for the state of Arkansas and Maryland by the Governor and Mayor respectively; and was awarded the "Key to the City" of Little Rock, Arkansas by Mayor Mark Stodola. In 2014, Ajayi was honoured alongside Nobel Peace Prize winner Leymah Gbowee, H.E. Ngozi Okonjo-Iweala (Nigeria's finance minister) and many others by the Global Connection for Women (GC4W) in its 2014 International Women's Day Awards Gala at the Harvard Club of New York.

Ajayi was among the Nigerians selected as part of Nigeria's Success Stories in the Private Sector in Agriculture by the Corporate Council on Africa and the Embassy of the Federal Republic of Nigeria. In her capacity as the then President of ANAC, Ajayi mobilized a Nigerian leadership coalition to challenge the false imagery of Nigerians in America as criminals in a documentary on CNN titled How To Rob A Bank?. CNN eventually apologized. She received an award from Congresswoman Barbara Lee for her role. Ajayi also received the "key to the city" from Dyersville, Iowa's mayor, James Heavens, who also presented a proclamation affirming that every 16 July will be celebrated as "Nigerian Friendship Day".
