= Jacob Dean =

American food and travel writer

- Occupations: Food and travel writer, recipe tester, and product reviewer
- Website: www.jacobdeanwrites.com

Jacob Dean is an American food, beverage and travel writer and editor currently based in New York City. He is the Updates Editor at Serious Eats and previously served as a columnist for the Michelin Guide, as associate editor at The Cook's Cook and as a freelance staff writer at DCist. His writing focuses on food, travel, beer, wine, and spirits, and cookbooks and cooking equipment. Jacob has also worked as a freelance recipe tester for the New York Times.

== Biography ==
Jacob Dean is the son of author, editor, and New York Times recipe tester and columnist Denise Landis. Dean holds graduate degrees in both forensic and clinical psychology and has a Doctorate in Psychology (Psy.D.) from the Chicago School of Professional Psychology - Washington, D.C.

As a food and travel writer, Dean traveled extensively across North America and to Central and South America, the Caribbean, Europe, North Africa, and Asia. His work has appeared in digital and print publications such as the Washington Post, Vice, The New York Times, The A.V. Club, The Takeout, Taste, VinePair, the Michelin Guide, Fodor's Travel, Wine Enthusiast, Robert Parker Wine Advocate, Modern Farmer, Plate Magazine, Serious Eats, Adweek, Alaska Beyond Magazine, and Roads and Kingdoms. He also worked as a freelance recipe tester for the New York Times.
