= Pour un Québec lucide =

Pour un Québec lucide (in English, For a clear sighted vision of Quebec) is a manifesto signed by 12 prominent Quebecers, including former premier Lucien Bouchard. Published on October 19, 2005, the manifesto tackled issues facing modern Quebec, highlighting Quebec's fiscal problems and promoting unpopular solutions including raising university tuition and electricity rates. The manifesto was met by a counter-manifesto, Pour un Québec Solidaire, whose authors went on to found the Québec solidaire political party.

== Signatories ==
- Lucien Bouchard (former Parti Québécois premier of Quebec)
- Joseph Facal (former Parti Québécois minister)
- Pierre Fortin (economics professor Université du Québec à Montréal)
- Robert Lacroix (administrator at the Université de Montréal)
- Sylvie Lalande
- Claude Montmarquette (economics professor at the l'Université de Montréal)
- André Pratte (Editor of La Presse)
- Denise Robert (co-founder and President of Cinémaginaire)
- Jean-Claude Robert (history professor at the Université du Québec à Montréal)
- Guy Saint-Pierre (former Quebec Liberal minister and former president of SNC-Lavalin)
- Marie Saint-Pierre (designer)
- Denise Verreault (president of Groupe maritime Verreault)
