= Dennis Greene =

Dennis Greene may refer to:

- Denny Greene (1949–2015), American singer
- Dennis Greene (footballer) (born 1968), English footballer and manager

== See also ==
- Dennis Green (disambiguation)
