= Denise Breitburg =

American marine ecologist

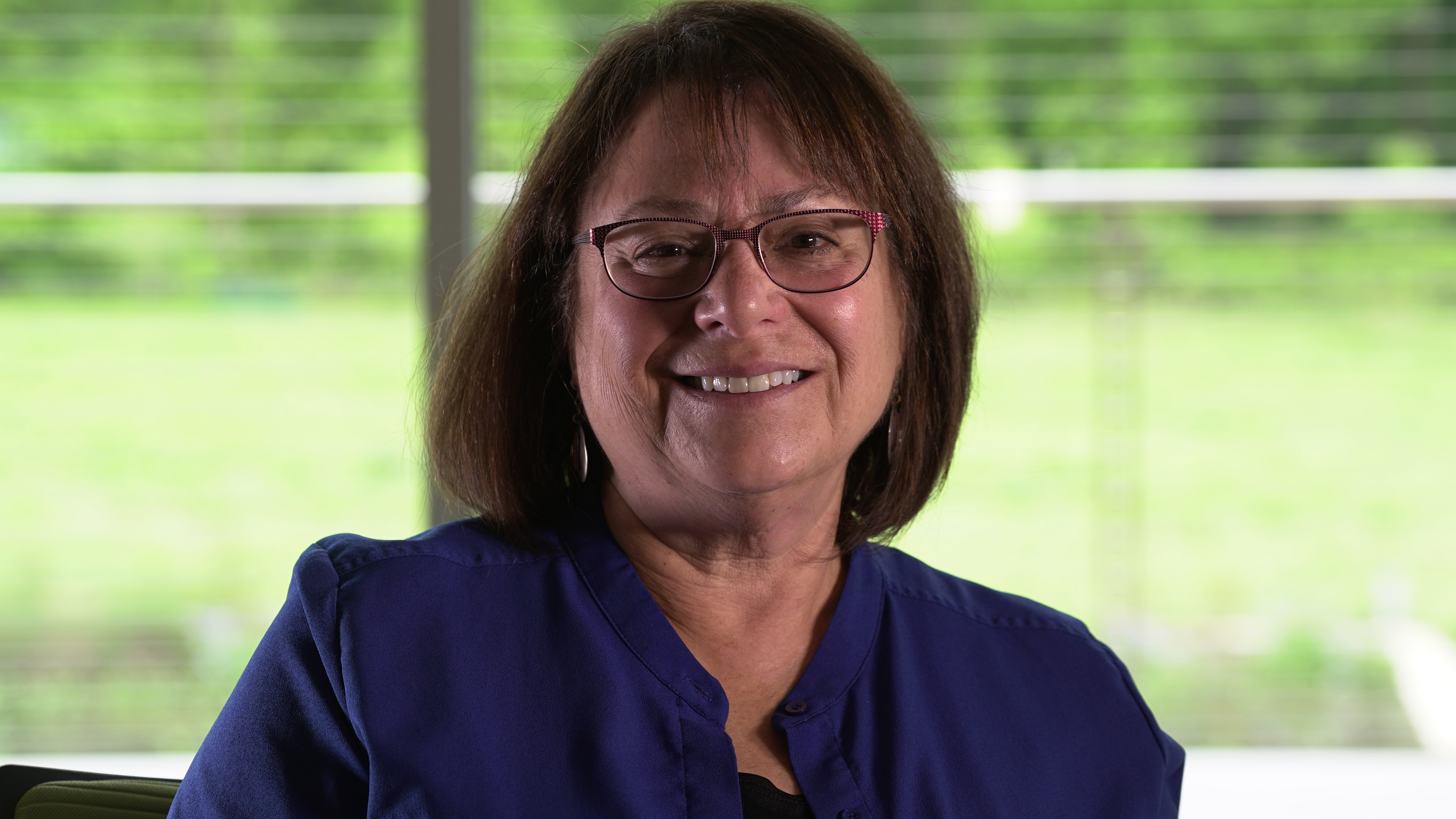
- Breitburg during a 2019 Voice of America Interview
- Education: Arizona State University, University of California, Santa Barbara
- Occupations: Ecologist, marine biologist, ichthyologist
- Employer(s): Smithsonian Environmental Research Center, Smithsonian Institution

Denise Breitburg is an American marine ecologist specializing in the effects of deoxygenation on marine systems and organisms such as oysters and jellyfish. Some of her expert areas include: Chesapeake Bay, hypoxia jellyfish, marine ecology, ocean acidification, and oysters. She is Scientist Emeritus, at the Smithsonian Environmental Research Center (SERC) and currently working in the Marine and Estuarine Ecology laboratories.

== Career ==
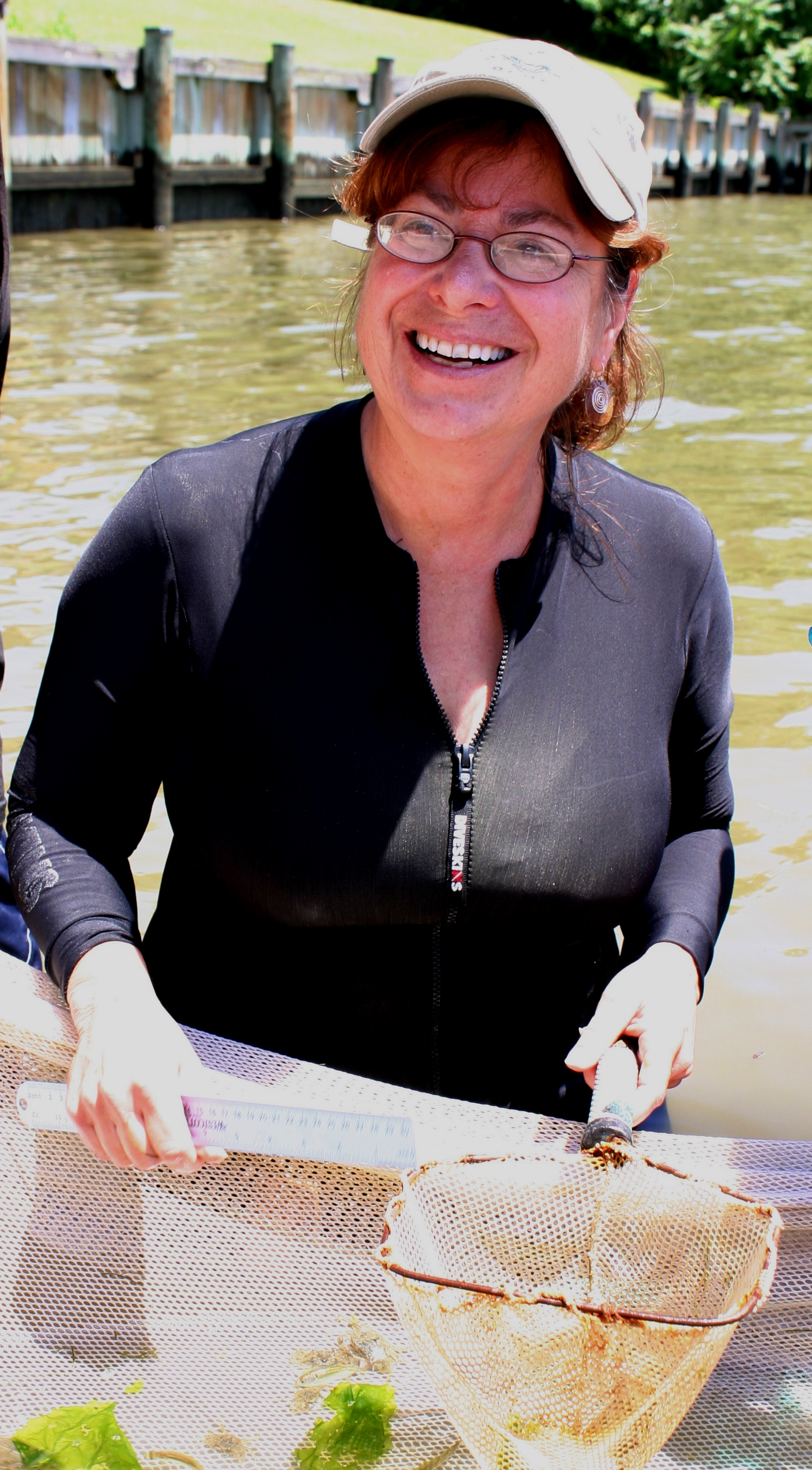
Breitburg in 2010

She received a B.S. in biology from Arizona State University and an M.A. in Biology and Ph.D. in biology from the University of California at Santa Barbara. She is adjunct professor at University of Maryland, College Park.

Breitburg has made a specialty of studying the "dead zones" that occur in fresh water, and particularly in the Chesapeake Bay.

She studied the shallow water hypoxia and its effects on individuals, populations, and ecosystems. She has been involved with the Global Ocean Oxygen Network (GO2NE) since 2016, helping to support and advise policymaking by UNESCO and the United Nations around the loss of oxygen in the ocean. Breitburg even received a grant from the NOAA Center for Sponsored Coastal Ocean Research.

She has studied sustainable oyster harvesting, and the impact of non-native species. Her team's work on the oyster population in the Chesapeake Bay has revealed,

... the oldest shells in Native American middens in the area dated to 3,200 years ago. They also measured the size of the oysters, to see if they were harvested before they reached full size. The results of the study suggest oysters were much larger hundreds of thousands of years ago than they are today, but they didn’t decrease in size between 3,200 and 400 years ago, when Native Americans were harvesting them.

Her lab is currently studying effects of low dissolved oxygen on interactions and distributions of Chesapeake Bay organisms, potential effects of oyster decline and restoration on the Chesapeake Bay food web, how multiple stressors related to human activities influence coastal systems, how the complexity of food webs influences responses of coastal systems to stress, how links among regions of the estuarine landscape influence gelatinous zooplankton population dynamics, and how to improve oyster restoration. Breitburg carries her field work beyond the Bay, testifying in front of the 2008 subcommittee (the Fisheries, Wildlife, and Oceans Committee On Natural Resources) of the U.S. House of Representatives. Her testimony focused on factors limiting the successful restoration of the Chesapeake Bay Native Eastern Oyster, and she advised against the proposed introduction of the non-native Asian Oyster to the bay. As of 2026, Breitburg has pivoted to research a solution for the deoxygenation of coastal seas: artificial reoxygenation. She discovered that the methods investigated only offer temporary relief; a more long-term solution would involve decreasing nutrient accumulation in coastal waters.

Breitburg has led research on global ocean deoxygenation, highlighting how declining oxygen levels poses serious risks to marine ecosystems and biodiversity and exploring potential solutions.
