= Denise Meunier =

French schoolteacher and resistant (1918–2022)

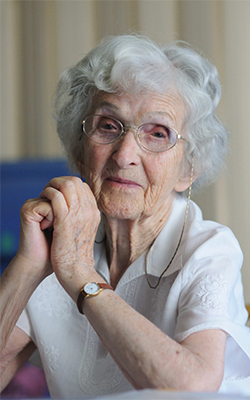
- Born: 6 January 1918; 1st arrondissement of Paris, France
- Died: 16 December 2022 (aged 104); Moirans, France
- Occupations: Schoolteacher; Resistance fighter
- Political party: PCF

Denise Meunier (6 January 1918 – 16 December 2022) was a French schoolteacher and resistant.

== Biography ==
Meunier was born in the 1st arrondissement of Paris on 6 January 1918 to a sommelier father and a café cashier mother. Her parents settled in Rouen after her birth. In 1935, she began training as a teacher and graduated in 1938. She began teaching in a small village before moving back to Rouen.

At the start of the 1940 school year, Meunier was sent to Dieppe in the midst of the German occupation. There, she met Valentin Feldman and Marie-Thérèse Lefèvre, with whom she published underground at L'Avenir normand. After Feldman's death, she joined Francs-Tireurs et Partisans as a liaison agent for Roland Leroy.

After World War II ended, Meunier was briefly in charge of the Jeunesses communistes, replacing Roland Leroy, before returning to her job as a schoolteacher in Canteleu and later in Grenoble. In Isère, she joined the Association nationale des anciens combattants et ami(e)s de la Résistance alongside Pierre Fugain, where she became departmental president in 2010.

Meunier died in Moirans on 16 December 2022, at the age of 104.

== Distinctions ==
- Knight of the Legion of Honour (2014)
- Medal of the city of Dieppe (2013)
- Medal of the city of Moirans (2021)
