= Denise Sundberg =

Swedish footballer (born 1990)

Personal information
- Full name: Denise Sundberg
- Date of birth: 16 November 1990 (age 35)
- Place of birth: Sweden
- Height: 1.70 m (5 ft 7 in)
- Position: Defender

Team information
- Current team: Kvarnsvedens IK
- Number: 20

Senior career*
Years	Team	Apps	(Gls)
2011	Gustafs GoIF	22	(4)
2012–	Kvarnsvedens IK	101	(5)
- * Club domestic league appearances and goals as of 22:25, 21 May 2016 (UTC)

Denise Sundberg (born 16 November 1990) is a Swedish football defender who plays for Kvarnsvedens IK.
