= Denise Duchateau =

French artist (c. 1755 – after 1823)

Denise Duchâteau (née Destours) was a French painter, master draughtsperson, and etcher active in Paris at the turn of the 19th century. She trained under Vernet and specialised in views of ruined religious buildings. A number of her works are today preserved in the collections of the Musée Carnavalet in Paris.

== Life ==
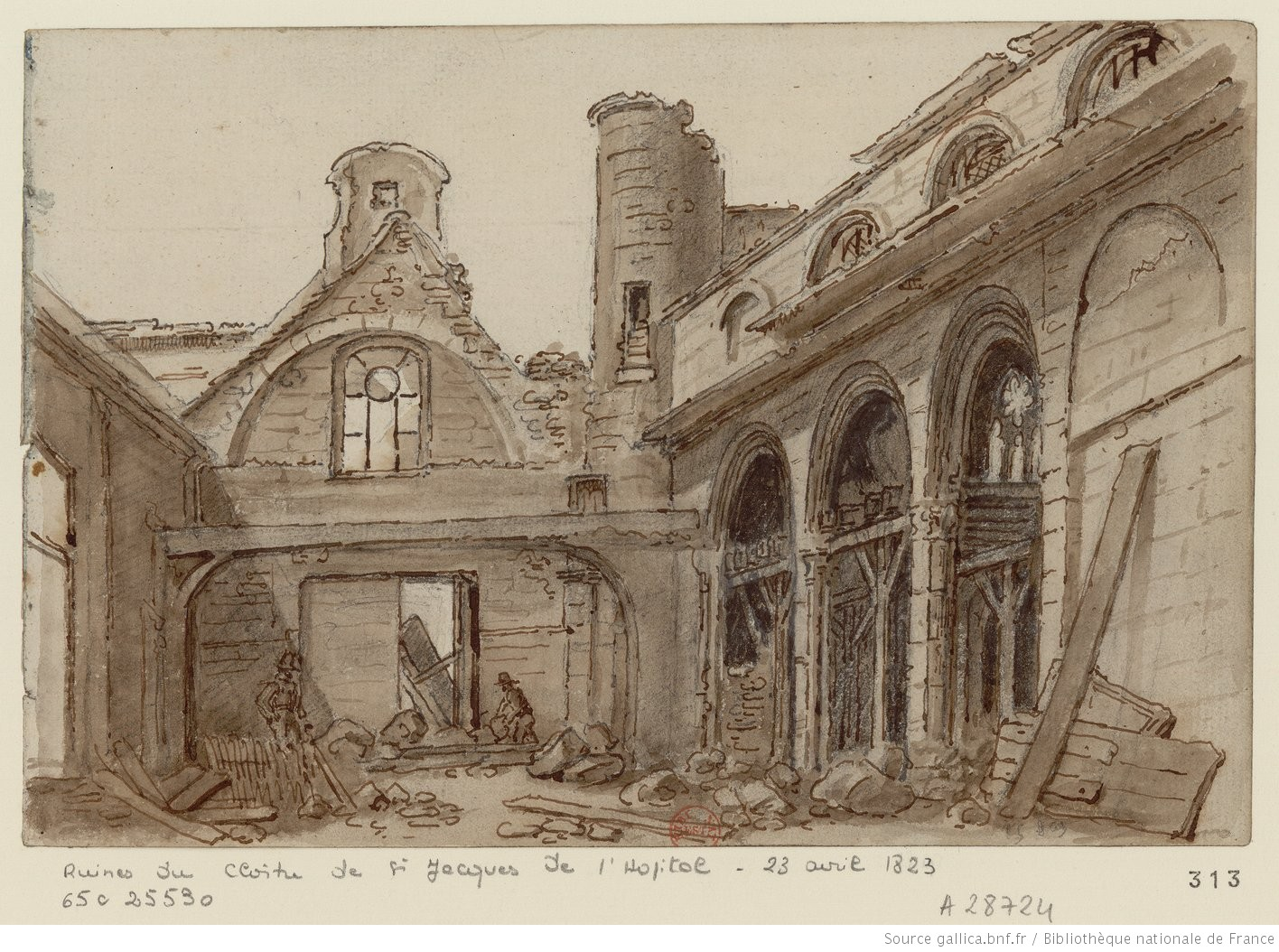
Ruins of the cloister of Saint Jacques of the hospital, 1823

Destours-Duchâteau received her artistic training under the landscape and marine painter Claude-Joseph Vernet. Like Vernet, Destours-Duchâteau specialised in detailed landscapes, seascapes, and architectural studies, though her own works were largely executed in watercolour, gouache, or etching.

Her works were exhibited at the Salon de la Correspondance from 1779 to 1782. At this time she used her maiden name and was residing on rue des Bourdonnais at the house of Monsieur Doré.

Records of Destours-Duchâteau' work suggest that she was married at some point between August and December 1782. After this time she used the name Mme Duchâteau. Destours-Duchâteau went on to participate in the Paris Salons of 1791 and 1793, by which time her residence had moved to 6 rue des Deux-Boules-Sainte-Opportune in Paris.

Over her lifetime, Destours-Duchâteau was referred to by various names, including Mlle or Demoiselle Destours, Mlle d'Estours, Mme Duchâteau, and Citoyenne Duchâteau. Her birth and death dates are unknown, as many Parisian civil and parish records were destroyed during fires of 1871. Dates of her artistic output and change in civil status suggest that she was born around 1755 and died after 1823.

== Works ==
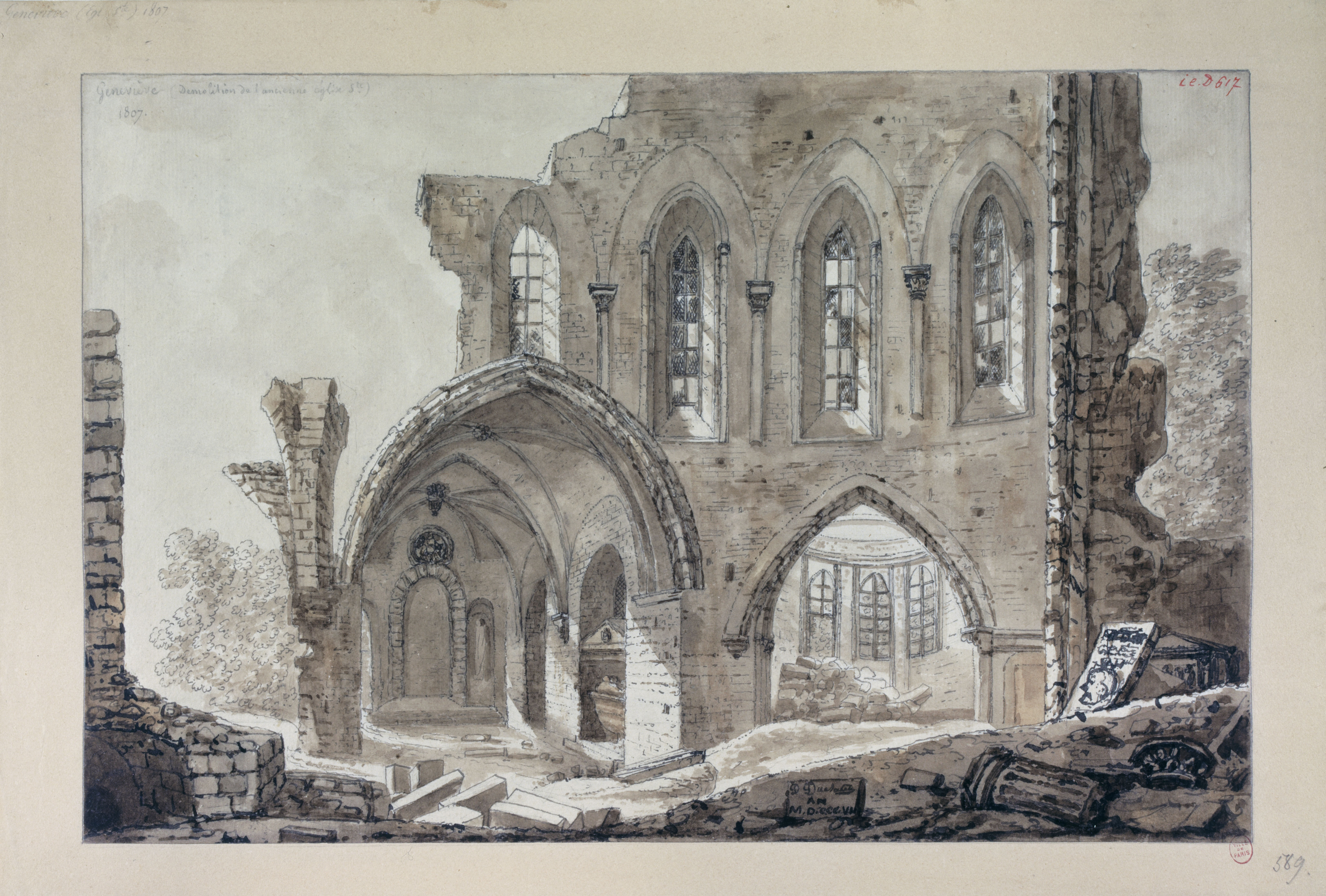
Demolition of the Église Sainte-Geneviève

Destours-Duchâteau is known for a series of views documenting the demolition and ruins of religious buildings in Paris in the early 1800s. She produced detailed architectural views depicting churches, abbeys, and cloisters during a period of intense urban transformation in Paris following the French Revolution.

Destours-Duchâteau's surviving works are primarily topographical and documentary in nature. They emphasise architectural detail and the material condition of buildings at the moment of their execution. As such, her drawings are valuable historical records of Parisian monuments that no longer exist or survive only in altered form.

Her works include those conserved at the Musée Carnavalet:

- The monuments of Mount Saint-Genevieve, visible from the gardens of the abbey / Les monuments de la montagne Sainte-Geneviève, visibles depuis les jardins de l’abbaye (1807)
- View of the interior of the ruins of Sainte-Geneviève, 23 rue Clovis / Vue de l’intérieur des ruines de Sainte-Geneviève, 23 rue Clovis (1807)
- Demolition of the church of Sainte-Geneviève, 23 rue Clovis / Démolition de l’église Sainte-Geneviève, 23 rue Clovis (1807)
- Facades of the abbey and the church of Sainte-Geneviève / Façades de l’abbaye et de l’église Sainte-Geneviève (1808)
- Rear view of the abbey of Sainte-Geneviève and its gardens / Aspect postérieur de l’abbaye Sainte-Geneviève et des jardins (between 1802 and 1812)
- Demolition of the church of the Holy Innocents / Démolition de l’église des Saints-Innocents (1810)
- Ruins of Saint-Louis du Louvre / Ruines de Saint-Louis du Louvre (1811)
- Demolition of the Carmes cloister at Place Maubert / Démolition du cloître des Carmes de la place Maubert (1813)
