= Denise Verreault =

Canadian businesswoman

Denise Verreault OC, CQ
- Born: 1958 (age 67–68); Les Méchins, Quebec
- Education: B.Ed in Education
- Alma mater: University of Quebec at Rimouski
- Organization: Groupe Maritime Verreault
- Title: CEO

Denise Verreault, OC CQ (born in 1958) is a Canadian businesswoman. She is currently the president and chief executive officer of Groupe Maritime Verreault Inc., a shipping company founded by her father, Borromée. Verreault was named the Quebec businesswoman of the year in 1999.

== Biography ==
Verreault was born in Les Méchins, Quebec. She received her Bachelor of Education degree from the University of Quebec at Rimouski.

Verreault served on several companies' board of directors. She began serving as a director for TELUS Québec in 1997. She was a member of the board of directors at the University of Quebec at Rimouski. Verreault also served as the representative for the Government of Canada on the St. Lawrence Seaway Management Corporation's board of directors.

Verreault was one of the twelve signatories of Pour un Québec lucide, a 2005 manifesto supporting economic development in Quebec.

In September 2013, Verreault invested $5 million in gluten-free grain production in Gaspésie.

== Groupe Maritime Verreault ==
In 1992, Verreault inherited Groupe Maritime Verreault Inc., after her father, Borromée Verreault's death. The company is the largest in Les Méchins.

For several months in 2011, Verreault fought with Quebec's economic development minister, Clément Gignac over the government's subsidization of rival company, Chantier Davie Canada Inc. She disagreed with Gignac, claiming he was funding "unfair competition" and that it may force her to shutdown her company.

In 2016, she accepted a $8.5 million contract for her company to service the CCGS Pierre Radisson icebreaker for the Canadian coast guard.

== Awards ==
Verreault was named the Quebec Businesswoman of Year in 1999.

In 2001, Verreault was inaugurated as a Knight of the National Order of Quebec. In February 2007, she was a recipient of the Order of Canada due to her experience in business management and promotion of women in business. In 2013, Verreualt received the Queen Elizabeth II Diamond Jubilee Medal.

In 2014, Verreault won the Mercure Leadership Germaine-Gibara award. She also received the Graduate Excellence Award from the University of Quebec at Rimouski.

She received an honorary Doctorate of Management from the University of Ottawa.
