= Denise Lyttle =

Irish sailor

Personal information
- Nationality: Irish
- Born: 8 September 1967 (age 59)

Sport
- Sport: Sailing

Denise Lyttle (born 8 September 1967) is an Irish sailor. She competed in the 1992 Summer Olympics and 1996 Summer Olympics.
