= Denise Pelletier (artist) =

American sculptor

Denise Pelletier is the Roman and Tatiana Weller Professor of Art at Connecticut College. She holds a Bachelors of Fine Arts from the University of Connecticut and a Masters of Fine Arts from Alfred University. Pelletier's areas of expertise are ceramics, sculpture, and site-specific art.

She has held multiple residences at the John Michael Kohler Arts Center. Pelletier was a 2014-2015 Dehn Foundation Visiting Artist. Her work has been reviewed in publications such as the New York Times and Houston Chronicle.
