= Denise Hsien Wu =

Taiwanese neuroscientist

- Education: B.S. National Taiwan University; M.S. National Chung Cheng University; PhD Rice University
- Scientific career
- Workplaces: National Central University; University of Pennsylvania; Rice University; National Chung Cheng University; National Taiwan University; National Yang Ming University; Macquarie University; City University of Hong Kong
- Thesis: (2003)

Denise Hsien Wu (吳嫻) is a professor of neuroscience, the head of the Concept & Language Laboratory, and the director of the Institute of Cognitive Neuroscience at National Central University, Taiwan.

== Early life and education ==
Wu studied a B.S. in psychology at National Taiwan University, followed by an M.S. in psychology at National Chung Cheng University. She then moved to Rice University for her Ph.D. in psychology, with a specialty in cognitive neuroscience. After earning her Ph.D., Wu joined Anjan Chatterjee's group as a postdoctoral research fellow at the University of Pennsylvania.

== Research ==
Research area

- Patients with aphasic and amnesic traumatic brain injury study
- Cognitive representation in action, conception, and language
- Mental representation and processing of short-term memory
- Mental Characterization of parallel information processing
- Phonological processing in Chinese character identification
- Applications of fMRI in Cognitive Neuroscience

== Selected awards ==
- 2013–2017 Outstanding Research Award, National Central University, Taiwan（中央大學101-105學年度學術研究傑出獎）
- 2016 Fellow of the Association for Psychological Science, USA
- 2015 Fellow of the Psychonomic Society, USA
- 2014 TWAS Young Affiliate, The Academy of Sciences for the Developing World, East and Southeast Asia and Pacific Region
- 2013 Distinguished Research Award, National Science Council, Taiwan（國科會優秀年輕學者研究計畫）
- 2007, 2012 Excellent Teaching Award, the College of Science, National Central University（中央大學理學院優良教師）
- 2012 Junior Research Investigators Award, Academia Sinica（中央研究院年輕學者研究著作獎）
- 2011 Excellent Teaching Award, the College of Electrical Engineering and Computer Science, National Central University（中央大學資電學院優良教師）
- 2009 Excellent Mentor Award, National Central University（中央大學優良導師）
- 2007 Young Investigator Merit Award, National Science Council（國科會傑出學者養成計畫）

== Selected publications ==
- Rueckl, J. G., Paz-Alonso, P. M., Molfese, P. J., Kuo, W.-J., Bick, A., Frost, S. J., Hancock, R., Wu, D. H., Mencl, W. E., Dunabeitia, J. A., Lee, J.-R., Oliver, M., Zevin, J. D., Hoeft, F., Carreiras, M., Tzeng, O. J.-L., Pugh, K. R., & Frost, R. (2015). Universal brain signature of proficient reading: Evidence from four contrasting languages. Proceedings of the National Academy of Sciences, 112(50), 15510–15515. doi: 10.1073/pnas.1509321112
- Hung, Y.-H., Pallier, C., Dehaene, S., Lin, Y.-C., Chang, A., Tzeng, O. J.-L., & Wu, D. H.* (2015). Neural correlates of merging number words. NeuroImage, 122, 33–43. doi: 10.1016/j.neuroimage

== Science outreach ==
Wu has been active on science outreach, including giving talks at the TED (conference) in Taipei and at the Tech-Talk FORUM of Scientific American. She also wrote articles for the Scientific American.
