= Denise Deegan (Irish author) =

Irish screenwriter and author

- Born: Cork, Ireland
- Occupations: Author, Screenwriter
- Writing career
- Genres: Adult, Young Adult, Fiction
- Notable work: The Butterfly Novels

Denise Deegan (born 1966 in County Cork, Ireland) is an Irish screenwriter and author of contemporary fictional and drama novels for adults and teens. She is currently adapting her teen series The Butterfly Novels for film. In 2012 she was nominated for the 2012 Irish Book Awards in the Young Adult category for her book And For Your Information... She worked as a nurse in Vincent's Hospital for 4 years and currently resides in County Dublin with her husband and two children.

== Bibliography ==
=== The Butterfly Novels ===
1. And By The Way... (2011)
2. And For Your Information... (2011)
3. And Actually... (2012)

=== Fiction ===
- Turning Turtle (1990)
- Time In A Bottle (2004)
- Love Comes Tumbling (2006)
- Do You Want What I Want (2007)
- For Charlie... (2012)
