= Denise Hunter =

American romance writer

- Born: Denise Ann Waters; December 2, 1968 (age 57); Middletown, Ohio, U.S.
- Occupation: Novelist
- Spouse: (1989-present)- Kevin Hunter
- Children: 3
- Writing career
- Period: 1998–present
- Genres: Romance, Women's fiction
- Website: www.denisehunterbooks.com

Denise Hunter is an American author of romance, Christian and women's fiction. She has written more than 40 novels and has appeared on the Amazon, ECPA, and Publishers Weekly bestsellers lists. Three of her books have been adapted into Hallmark movies: The Convenient Groom, A December Bride, and The Goodbye Bride. Hunter has appeared on the 700 Club and received awards such as The Holt Medallion Award, The Carol Award, The Reader's Choice Award, and The Foreword Book of the Year Award.

== Early life ==
Hunter was born in 1968 in Middletown, Ohio. She graduated from Madison High School and attended Sinclair Community College, where she majored in graphic art for two years. In 1989 she married Kevin Hunter and they moved to Indiana, where she began attending Indiana University–Purdue University Fort Wayne, changing her major to secondary education. Three years later, Hunter quit college to stay home with her two children. During this time, Hunter began to dream of writing a novel, but because life as a young mother was busy, she did not have time to write.

== Writing career ==
In 1996, inspired by the death of her grandfather, Hunter began writing her first novel, Stranger’s Bride. She has said that her early works were written while her children napped.

In 2016 two of Hunter's novels were adapted into Hallmark movies: The Convenient Groom, starring Vanessa Marcil and David Sutcliffe, and A December Bride, starring Jessica Lowndes and Daniel Lissing. In 2019, Hunter's novel The Goodbye Bride was adapted as Christmas on My Mind, starring Ashley Greene and Andrew Walker, on the Hallmark Movies & Mysteries Channel.

== Personal life ==
Hunter and her husband live in northern Indiana. They have three children. Her husband owns a home improvement company, which inspires the many handyman characters in her novels.

== Bibliography ==
=== Riverbend Romance Series ===
1. Riverbend Gap (October 2021 HarperCollins Christian Publishing)
2. Mulberry Hollow (April 2022 HarperCollins Christian Publishing)
3. Harvest Moon (September 2022 HarperCollins Christian Publishing)

=== Bluebell Inn Series ===
1. Lake Season (November 2019 HarperCollins Christian Publishing)
2. Carolina Breeze (May 2020 HarperCollins Christian Publishing)
3. Autumn Skies (October 2020 HarperCollins Christian Publishing)

=== Blue Ridge Series ===
1. Blue Ridge Sunrise (November 2017 HarperCollins Christian Publishing)
2. Honeysuckle Dreams (May 2018 HarperCollins Christian Publishing)
3. On Magnolia Lane (November 2018 HarperCollins Christian Publishing)

=== Single Titles ===
- Sweetbriar Cottage (June 13, 2017 HarperCollins Christian Publishing)
- Sweetwater Gap (Dec 16, 2008 Thomas Nelson)
- Summer by the Tides (May 21, 2019 HarperCollins Christian Publishing)
- Bookshop by the Sea (April 13, 2021 HarperCollins Christian Publishing)

=== Summer Harbor Series ===
1. Falling Like Snowflakes (September 8, 2015 HarperCollins Christian Publishing)
2. The Goodbye Bride (March 8, 2016 HarperCollins Christian Publishing)
3. Just a Kiss (September 6, 2016 HarperCollins Christian Publishing)

=== The Chapel Springs Series ===
1. Barefoot Summer (June 2013 Thomas Nelson)
2. A December Bride (Novella, Dec, 2013, ebook only, Thomas Nelson)
3. Dancing With Fireflies (March 2014 Thomas Nelson)
4. The Wishing Season (Dec 9, 2014 Thomas Nelson)
5. Married ’til Monday (June 9, 2015 Thomas Nelson)

=== Smitten Series ===
==== co-authors Colleen Coble, Kristin Billerbeck, and Diann Hunt ====
1. Smitten (Dec 2011 Thomas Nelson)
2. Secretly Smitten (Jan 2013 Thomas Nelson)
3. Smitten Book Club (Jan 2014 Thomas Nelson)

=== Big Sky Series ===
1. A Cowboy’s Touch (April 2011 Thomas Nelson)
2. The Accidental Bride (Jan 2012 Thomas Nelson)
3. The Trouble with Cowboys (Oct 2012 Thomas Nelson)

=== Nantucket Series ===
1. Surrender Bay (2007 Thomas Nelson)
2. The Convenient Groom (2008 Thomas Nelson)
3. Seaside Letters (2009 Thomas Nelson)
4. Driftwood Lane (2010 Thomas Nelson)

=== New Heights Series ===
1. Mending Places (2004 Howard Books)
2. Saving Grace (2005 Howard Books)
3. Finding Faith (2006 Howard Books)

=== Historical ===
Kansas Brides (2004 Barbour Publishing) which includes the following four stories:

- Stranger’s Bride (2000 Barbour Publishing)
- Never a Bride (2001 Barbour Publishing)
- Bittersweet Bride (2002 Barbour Publishing)
- His Brother’s Bride (2003 Barbour Publishing)

=== Novellas ===
- This Time Around (2021 Thomas Nelson)
- Truth or Dare (2012, ebook only)
- Game of Love (2013, ebook only)
- The Perfect Match (2013, ebook only)
- Winter Brides (Nov 25, 2014 Zondervan) Includes “A December Bride” and novellas by Deborah Raney and Betsy St. Amant

== Screen adaptations ==
=== Hallmark Channel ===
- The Convenient Groom (2016)
- A December Bride (2016)
- The Goodbye Bride (2019)
