= Denise Mercedes =

American plus-size fashion model and clothing designer

- Born: October 23, 1991 (age 34); Jersey City, New Jersey, U.S.
- Occupations: Model, clothing designer, influencer
- Years active: 2005–present
- Known for: Becauseitsmybody campaign
- Modeling information
- Height: 5 ft 4 in (163 cm)
- Agency: MSA Models NYC

Denise Mercedes (born October 23, 1991) is an American plus-size fashion model and clothing designer from New Jersey. She has been featured on BuzzFeed, Refinery29, and FabUplus Magazine. Mercedes is known for her clothing line with Rebdolls. She is the founder of the #becauseitsmybody campaign, a collaborative photography campaign that encourages body positivity.

A native of Jersey City, New Jersey, she is of Dominican descent.

== Career ==
Mercedes began modeling when she was 13 years old. She started her career by working as a photography studio receptionist. Mercedes's employer allowed her to model in photoshoots as a hobby.

When Mercedes was 16 years old, she started submitting her photographs to agencies. Due to modeling agency height standards, it was difficult for her to receive representation at the time. She continued to participate in modeling shoots. In 2012, when she began her fashion blog for plus size women, she began collaborating with different plus size boutiques.

In 2017, Mercedes began a body positivity campaign called #becauseitsmybody, a collaborative photography movement.

She has collaborated with clients including Forever 21, Target, JCPenney, and Rue21. She has also worked with smaller body positive online shops such as Feminine Funk and Curvy Girl Fever. She runs a clothing line with Rebdolls.
