= Denise Galloway =

American microbiologist

- Education: City University of New York
- Known for: HPV and cancer research
- Awards: 2019 AAA&S; 2022 AACR Fellow
- Scientific career
- Fields: Microbiology; pathology
- Workplaces: Fred Hutchinson Cancer Research Center; University of Washington School of Medicine

Denise A. Galloway is the associate director of the Human Biology Division and scientific director of the Pathogen-Associated Malignancies Integrated Research Center at Fred Hutchinson Cancer Research Center, and a professor of microbiology and pathology at the University of Washington School of Medicine. Her research focuses on human papillomavirus and its role in the development of cancer.

== Education ==
Galloway attended Hunter College High School in New York. Galloway received her Ph.D. in molecular biology from the City University of New York in 1975, followed by a postdoctoral fellowship at Cold Spring Harbor Laboratory in 1978.

== Career ==
Currently, she is the associate director of the Human Biology Division at Fred Hutchinson Cancer Research Center and the Paul Stephanus Memorial Endowed Chair of microbiology and pathology at the University of Washington School of Medicine.

Her research contributed to the development of the HPV vaccine as a cancer prevention method. Her research continues to work on how these types of viruses cause and interact with other types of cancers.

She was elected to the American Academy of Arts and Sciences in 2019. She became a Fellow of the American Association for Cancer Research in 2022.

== Personal life ==
Galloway has two daughters.
