= Denise Rose =

British military police detective (1970–2004)

Staff Sergeant Denise Rose

Denise Michelle Rose (22 April 1970 – 31 October 2004) was a staff Sergeant of the Royal Military Police's Special Investigation Branch and she was the first British female soldier to die in military operations in the Iraq War. Her death was later ruled to have been a suicide.

Rose was found dead from a gunshot wound at the Army base in the Shatt-al-Arab Hotel, Basra, on 31 October 2004.

Rose was originally from Liverpool, England. She joined the Royal Military Police in 1989, and trained as an SIB investigator in 1995, conducting investigations into serious incidents within the military in the UK and Cyprus. She deployed as a volunteer to Iraq on 27 September 2004, operating as part of a small team of specialist investigators to provide security for the people of Iraq and assist in the rebuilding of the country through the provision of a well trained police force.
