= Denise Landis =

British-born American food writer, editor, cookbook author, and recipe developer

Denise Landis (born Denise Evelyn Tillar) is a British-born American food writer, editor, cookbook author, and recipe tester and developer. She was a recipe tester for The New York Times for over twenty-five years. She is the founder and CEO of the international food community for professional chefs and passionate home cooks, The Cook's Cook, LLC, with a website and free community registration at TheCooksCook.com.

== Education and career ==
Denise Tillar Landis has a B.A. degree in cultural anthropology from the State University of New York at Buffalo. She was employed as a professional contract archaeologist between 1976 and 1983, working in various locations around the country. In 1983 she met and married James David Landis, then Editor-in-Chief of William Morrow & Co., Inc.

In 1985, she was hired by Carol Shaw as a freelance recipe tester for The New York Times; she held that position for over twenty-five years before leaving to publish the first international food magazine for professional and aspiring food writers, The Cook's Cook: A Magazine for Cooks, Food Writers & Recipe Testers.

Landis' career in the food world began when she took a short-term job testing a few recipes for Maria Guarnaschelli, a cookbook editor at William Morrow. It evolved into a freelance job that she performed for two years before she was hired by Carol Shaw as a freelance recipe tester for the Living Section of The New York Times, a job she held for over twenty-five years.

In 2001, Michalene Busico, then Dining section editor at The New York Times, invited Landis to begin writing for the section. Her subsequent contributions included the "Test Kitchen" column, reviews of kitchen ware, "Diner's Journal", articles for the Living section, and a Q&A food column called "Food Chain". She also taught cooking classes for children (including a three-month-long after-school class on Medieval cooking), and began writing articles on food and reviews of cooking products for the Times and other publications.

She is a member of the New York Chapter of Les Dames d'Escoffier.

== Personal life ==
Landis is married to James David Landis, an American poet, novelist and wine writer. Their son Jacob Dean is Updates Editor at Serious Eats and has been a food and travel writer for The Washington Post, Vibe, The New York Times, The A.V. Club, Vice and Roads and Kingdoms. Their son Benjamin Landis is the former founder and CEO of Fanbase.net, a social media growth company based in Santa Monica, CA and is now a talent manager in Los Angeles. Their daughter Sara Landis Grinspoon is a speech therapist specializing in accent reduction. Their daughter Larisa Anderson Ogba works is a licensed financial broker.

== The Cook's Cook ==
In 2013, Denise launched a full-length international digital magazine called The Cook's Cook: A Magazine for Cooks, Food Writers and Recipe Testers. The Cook's Cook now serves an international food community with a website, social media, and advertising and marketing programs for partnered brands.

== Dinner For Eight ==
Dinner for Eight is a collection of four seasons of dinner party recipes. The book includes simple, ethnic food recipes. Each of the forty menus features an appetizer, first course, main course, accompaniment and dessert, as well as a selection of suggested wine or beverage pairings.
