= Denise Ramsden =

Denise Ramsden may refer to:

- Denise Ramsden (cyclist) (born 1990), Canadian road bicycle racer
- Denise Ramsden (athlete) (1952–2003), English sprint athlete
