= Denise Johnson =

Denise Johnson may refer to:

- Denise Fox, also Johnson, a character from the BBC soap opera EastEnders
- Denise R. Johnson (born 1947), Vermont attorney and judge
- Denise Johnson (1963-2020), British singer
