= Denise Ryner =

Canadian curator

Denise Ryner is a Canadian curator and writer. She was director and curator at Or Gallery, Vancouver (2017-2022). Ryner has worked as an independent curator, writer and educator at several galleries, artist-run centres and institutions, in Toronto, Vancouver and Berlin. Ryner has contributed to publications like FUSE magazine and Canadian Art magazine.

== Education ==
In 2002, Ryner obtained her diploma from the Ontario College of Art and Design. Ryner received her BA in Art History from the University of Toronto in 2011 and her MA in Art History from the University of British Columbia in 2014.

== Career ==
Ryner was the Director/Curator at the Or Gallery (2017-2022). She is a visiting researcher and curator at the Visual Art and Film department at Haus der Kulturen der Welt in Berlin, Germany.

From 2010 to 2012, Ryner worked as an archivist at Art Metropole, Toronto where she oversaw donations, loans, public and research inquiries, related to the AM Collection and Institutional Archive as well as curated annual Gifts by Artists exhibitions. Ryner curated the exhibition, Location/Dislocation at the Jackman Humanities Institute in Toronto from September 2011 to July 2012. Welcoming the contributions of contemporary artists for the first time, the arts program exhibition focused on hybridity, displacement within diasporic communities through photo and installation work. Ryner worked as the writer and researcher for exhibition interpretative texts for the project Mashup: The Birth of Modern Culture, Vancouver Art Gallery, Vancouver, Canada (2014–2015).As the curatorial assistant and intern at SFU Galleries in the same year, she curated Walk: Through a Window: RAIN OR SHINE SATURDAYS consisting of sound walks that observed the soundscape of British Columbia’s coastal communities in Vancouver. The project brought together a variety of art practitioners and researchers. Ryner has also taught curatorial practice as a sessional faculty at Emily Carr University. She was an editorial board member and contributing editor to Fuse Magazine from 2011 to 2014. In 2015, Ryner curated Public Objects, Private Frames for the Canadian Heritage Regional Office in Toronto She has also worked on curatorial projects at 8eleven Project Space, as the curator for the exhibition Interim Measures, at Roundhouse Community Arts Centre and Contemporary Art Gallery, Vancouver. In April 2016, in collaboration with Jayce Salloum, VIVO Media Arts Centre, Vancouver, Ryner co-curated the thirstDays no. 3: Harbour/Haven exhibition which showed the works of Beau Dick and aka collective.

== Publications ==
As part of FUSE magazine’s event Not a Collection of Cool Stuff in 2011, Ryner interviewed Bidoun magazine contributor, Babak Radboy, where they discussed film programming and acquisitions. In 2014, Ryner’s exhibition essay, An Expedition was published by Xpace, Toronto. In September 2018, Ryner’s essay Fair-Weather Funding was featured in Canadian Art's Fall issue. In 2016 BlackFlash magazine published Ryner’s essay about Manuel Piña-Baldoquín’s video work Naufragios.

== Awards and grants ==
In 2016, Ryner received the Canada Council for the Arts, Grant to Culturally Diverse Curators and Travel Grant to Professionals in the Visual Arts. From 2015-2016, she also received the British Columbia Arts Council, Early Career Development Grant, the Elsie and Audrey Jang Scholarship from the University of British Columbia in 2013, and in 2012, the Faculty of Arts Graduate Award, University of British Columbia. Other awards Ryner has received include the Principal Mariel O’Neill-Karch Legacy Scholarship, University of Toronto (2008-2010), the Dean’s List Scholar, University of Toronto 2008, Louis and Lisa Cheng Scholarship in Art History and Visual Studies, University of Toronto 2008, and the Hans Karl Lücke Award for Academic Achievement, University of Toronto in 2008.
