= Denise Hinkel =

American plasma physicist

- Education: University of California
- Scientific career
- Workplaces: Lawrence Livermore National Laboratory
- Thesis: Resonant Absorption In An Inhomogeneous, Unmagnetized Plasma (1990)
- Doctoral advisor: Burton D. Fried

Denise Hinkel is a plasma physicist at Lawrence Livermore National Laboratory.

Hinkel received her PhD in physics in 1990 from the University of California, supervised by Burton D. Fried, titled Resonant Absorption In An Inhomogeneous, Unmagnetized Plasma.

In 2007 she became a Fellow of the American Physical Society for "extensive contributions to laser-plasma interaction physics and radiation hydrodynamic design of inertial-confinement fusion targets, and to the fundamental physics of linear and nonlinear wave propagation in plasma."

She was elected to lead American Physical Society Division of Plasma Physics in 2021. Her research involves laser-plasma interactions for nuclear fusion.

== Selected publications ==
- Hinkel, Denise; Mauel, Michael (August 2022). "Foreword to special issue: Papers from the 63rd annual meeting of the APS Division of Plasma Physics, November 8–12, 2021". Physics of Plasmas. 29 (8): 080401. Bibcode:2022PhPl...29h0401H. doi:10.1063/5.0109323.
- Hurricane, O. A.; Callahan, D. A.; Casey, D. T.; Celliers, P. M.; Cerjan, C.; Dewald, E. L.; Dittrich, T. R.; Döppner, T.; Hinkel, D. E.; Hopkins, L. F. Berzak; Kline, J. L.; Le Pape, S.; Ma, T.; MacPhee, A. G.; Milovich, J. L.; Pak, A.; Park, H.-S.; Patel, P. K.; Remington, B. A.; Salmonson, J. D.; Springer, P. T.; Tommasini, R. (February 20, 2014). "Fuel gain exceeding unity in an inertially confined fusion implosion". Nature. 506 (7488): 343–348. Bibcode:2014Natur.506..343H. doi:10.1038/nature13008. PMID 24522535.
- Modeling of HF Propagation and Heating in the Ionosphere, (1992)
