= Denise Holstein =

French Holocaust survivor and author (1927–2024)

Denise Holstein (6 February 1927 – 16 November 2024) was a French Auschwitz concentration camp survivor and Holocaust witness, who was liberated on 15 April 1945. As a Holocaust witness, Holstein tells her story in two books and in a documentary made by a student from the Lycée Corneille in Rouen. For almost fifty years, Holstein never spoke about her life before writing about it. As a Holocaust witness, Holstein visited school children, to describe and share her experiences.

== Early life ==
Holstein was born in Rouen, France (Note: In an apartment at 17 Rue Jeanne-d'Arc) into a wealthy and refined Jewish family. Her father, Bernard Holstein, was born in Kaunas in the Russian Empire (now Lithuania) on 20 August 1890 and was a dental surgeon. (Note: The dental surgery at 79 rue Jeanne d'Arc.) Bernard Holstein fought in two wars and was a reserve officer. Her mother, Juliette Holstein née Cohen was born on 16 October 1902 in Paris. She had a brother Jean who was born 26 July 1924. She studied at the Lycée Corneille and the Lycée Jeanne-d'Arc.

== Occupied France ==
In 1939, as a reserve officer, Bernard Holstein was mobilised as a lieutenant and was tasked with the responsibility for the Gueules cassées servicemen in the 3rd military region, that was constituted at the Rouen hospital. In 1940, Denise's mother Juliette, joined her husband as an ambulance driver. She followed the French army in its retreat. Denise and her brother Jean fled from the German advance with their maternal grandmother and great-grandmother in an exodus that led them initially to Vierzon and then finally to Avignon where they joined the rest of their family. The family returned to Rouen when their father, Bernard was given permission to continue working as a dentist. He was the only Jewish dentist in Rouen to receive this right.

Denise's father was arrested for the first time during the round-up of 6 May 1942 and interned in the Drancy internment camp. He was liberated three months later, in August 1942. Denise's brother was sent to the free zone where he hid in the Alps mountains at Villard-de-Lans. He would eventually join the Maquis, later in the war.

On the 15 January 1943, Denise and her parents were arrested at their home in the evening. It took place during the great roundup of all the Jews of Rouen and across the Seine-Inférieure department. On that day, two hundred and twenty adults and children from the department were arrested on the orders of the prefect André Parmentier, who had not even asked for authorisation from his superiors in the French occupied zone. Transferred to Drancy, they were either deported to Auschwitz concentration camp or Sobibor extermination camp.

Denise, who was ill, was hospitalized with diphtheria and mumps. Her parents were deported from Drancy to Auschwitz on Convoy No. 62, dated 20 November 1943. She never saw them again. As an orphan, she benefited from the help of the Union générale des israélites de France (UGIF) and did not return to the Drancy camp. She was first accommodated at the Guy Patin home, which took in children whose parents had been deported while attending the Lamartine high school, then at the Lamarck street centre. She was then housed at the UGIF Louveciennes children's home in western Paris. When Denise was 17 years old she became a monitor or counsellor for a group of nine small children whose parents had been deported.

== Arrest and deportation ==
On 22 July 1944, the Nazi officer and anti-semite Alois Brunner decided to round up all the occupants of the children's homes. Denise continued to look after her little protégés in Drancy. She hoped that the Allies would arrive in Paris before the deportation. However, on 31 July 1944, she was deported to Auschwitz with the 34 children from the Louveciennes children's home:

One thousand three hundred people in incredible conditions, crammed together with a few mattresses, buckets, barely enough to drink when it was really hot and there were only very small openings to let in a little air. She tried to support the children by singing and consoling them.

When Holstein arrived at Auschwitz, a French deportee saved her by telling her not to take the hand of a small child, a little girl, who was walking alone and crying. Holstein took her by the hand anyway. A second Frenchman ordered her to leave and this saved her life. The 34 children from Louveciennes were sent directly to the gas chamber, where they were murdered. From Denise's room in the home, only two children survived. One child was Samuel Przemisliawski, who was deported to Bergen-Belsen concentration camp, as the son of a prisoner of war. The second child was Paulette Sklarz, who was a patient in Saint-Germain hospital at the time of the arrests. Six other children, who were rounded up in the centre of Louveciennes, also survived.

On 3 August 1944, Holstein arrived in Auschwitz and was selected for forced labour in the camp. After a fortnight's quarantine, she was tattooed with an identification number. Holstein stated that when a deportee complained, the pollacks (derogatory reference to a person of Polish descent) who tattooed her would push the needles in even deeper. The work she was assigned was exhausting, such as transporting blocks of stone. She worked until three in the morning, with only some kind of coffee for breakfast. The roll call lasted until eight o'clock, on her knees, without moving.

Holstein caught scarlet fever in the camp and ended up in the Revier. It is there that she came into contact with Josef Mengele. She had never heard of him before and wondered why the announcement of his arrival caused such terror throughout the infirmary. Holstein stated:

In a voice with an imperious tone he read out a list of names in which I was included, and made us get out of bed, take off our nightgowns, and in front of each name he made a little sign that we could not understand: which of us would be chosen, perhaps even all of us, but there was nothing to hope for. The unfortunate women sobbed, holding their children tightly in their arms, others went completely mad and tore their hair out... it was in the evening that the Schreiberin came into the room and read a long list on which my name did not appear, but that of all the skinny women, of those who had children and of all those who had typhus. It was then that I understood that they were going to be taken to the gas chamber and then burned. So the men we had seen in the camp had been telling us the truth about the crematorium. Until that day I had not believed any of this and I finally understood that all the people who had not returned to the camp with us had suffered this awful fate.

When she emerged from the Revier after seven weeks, the camp had turned into a vast quagmire. At the time the camp was full of supplies and she was able to regain her strength. At the end of 1944, she was transferred to Bergen-Belsen concentration camp, that was liberated on 15 April 1945 by British soldiers. When she was released, she was ill with typhus and immediately put in quarantine.

== After deportation ==
After returning from deportation, Holstein went to live with her grandmother. Holstein wrote her memories in the summer of 1945. However, her testimony wasn't published, merely kept private, within the family.

In July 1945, Holstein went back to work as life returned some to form of normality. She began working, first became a saleswoman, then a medical secretary at the Necker Hospital in Paris. On the 10 February 1947, Holstein married Jean Samuel. They have three children, a son Patrick born in 1948, Catherine born in 1949 and their last daughter Marie-Hélène, born in 1953. In 1955, Holstein began a career as a representative for luxury children's clothing company. In 1966, the couple divorced.

In December 1990, Holstein was invited to lay a commemorative plaque in Louveciennes, in memory of the children deported from the UGIF centre. There she met the Nazi hunter Serge Klarsfeld, who challenged her as to her duty to testify as a holocaust witness. That same year, she published her testimony for the first time, by the Paris-based publisher, Edition⁰1 under the title Je ne vous oublierai jamais, mes enfants d'Auschwitz (I will never forget you, my children of Auschwitz).

Over the years Holstein has made several trips to Auschwitz with schoolchildren, some of which were filmed. Her memories were published again in 2008 under the title Le Manuscrit de Cayeux-sur-Mer, juillet août 1945, Rouen - Drancy - Louveciennes - Birkenau - Bergen-Belsen by the Paris-based publisher Le Manuscrit. The manuscript was followed by interviews with the inspector of the Paris Academy, Raymond Riquier. They shed light on the conditions under which the manuscript was written and on certain aspects of the story. In the last part, a historical study by Françoise Bottois, a secondary school history teacher in Rouen, provides a better understanding of the annihilation of the Jews in the town between 1940 and 1943. In March 2020, a documentary was created by Baptiste Antignani for France Inter, that was shown on Canal+ .

Holstein died on 16 November 2024, at the age of 97.

== Bibliography ==
- Holstein, Denise (2008). Le manuscrit de Cayeux-sur-Mer, juillet-août 1945 Rouen, Drancy, Louveciennes, Birkenau, Bergen-Belsen, 1943-1945 [The Cayeux-sur-Mer manuscript, July–August 1945 Rouen, Drancy, Louveciennes, Birkenau, Bergen-Belsen, 1943-1945]. Collection Témoignages de la Shoah (in French). Paris: Ed. Le Manuscrit. ISBN 9782304019681. OCLC 244004684.
- Holstein, Denise (1995). "Je ne vous oublierai jamais, mes enfants d'Auschwitz--" [I will never forget you, my children of Auschwitz--]. Témoignage Edition⁰1. (in French). Paris: Édition1̊. ISBN 9782863916728. OCLC 417326386.

== Literature ==
- Serge Klarsfeld; Fils et filles des déportés juifs de France. (2012). Mémorial de la déportation des juifs de France [Memorial of the deportation of the Jews of France] (in French). Paris: FFDJF, Les fils et filles des déportés juifs de France. OCLC 793413458.
- Antignani, Baptiste (2020). Une vie nous sépare : récit [A life separates us: story] (in French). Paris: Fayard. ISBN 9782213716602. OCLC 1141102016.
- Baptiste Antignani (4 January 2021). Une vie nous sépare - Baptiste Antignani [A life separates us - Baptiste Antignani] (Documentary) (in French). Paris: Federation Entertainment, France Télévisions et Canal+ Family, Fondation pour la Mémoire de la Shoah.

== Distinctions ==
- Knight of the Ordre des Palmes académiques 27 June 2001, decorated by the rector of the Académie des sciences, belles-lettres et arts de Rouen.
- Knight of the Legion of Honour 27 January 2006.
