= Denise Pence =

American actress (born 1949)

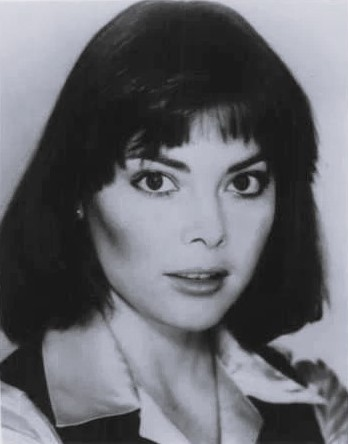
- Pence in 1982
- Born: March 3, 1949 (age 77); Rapid City, South Dakota, U.S.
- Occupations: Actress, television, entrepreneur, producer
- Known for: Katie Parker on Guiding Light
- Spouse(s): Steven Boockvor (February 24, 1973 –present)
- Website: Facebook Fan Page

Denise Pence (born March 3, 1949) is an American actress. Pence may be best known to television audiences for her role as Katie Parker on the soap opera Guiding Light.

Pence was born in South Dakota, and raised in El Paso, Texas. Pence pursued her BFA at the University of North Carolina School of the Arts. In 1970 while living temporarily at The Rehearsal Club (New York) and attending a Martha Graham Summer Program, she auditioned for The Rothschilds and put her studies on hold. Pence received an Honors BA in Communications from Fordham University in 2000.

== Career ==
Pence landed a role in the Michael Kidd production of The Rothschilds was the first swing for the original Broadway company of Follies, directed by Hal Prince & Michael Bennett and Pippin, directed by Bob Fosse. Giving notice in Pippin, Pence got her first dramatic role as “Connie” in Come Blow Your Horn at the Carousel DT in Ohio which almost immediately led to her audition for Guiding Light. Pence and husband Steven Boockvor were inspirations for the characters of Al and Kristine in A Chorus Line

She also appeared in the film version of Jesus Christ Superstar directed by Norman Jewison, and appeared briefly in Threesome, a movie of the week for CBS.

She subsequently went on to appear as “Irma” in Irma La Douce at the now defunct Darien Dinner Theater and “Lina Lamont” in Singing In The Rain at Northshore Theater, RI. As a member of the now-defunct Articulate Theatre Company, she worked with a variety of new playwrights.

=== Guiding Light ===
Pence may be best known for her role as Katie Parker on the soap opera Guiding Light. Pence appeared on the show as a contract player from June 1977 through April 1985.

Pence released a series of videos on YouTube discussing her time in the role of Katie and her thoughts about how various writers and producers approached the role of Katie in the show.

=== Other projects ===
Pence produced VintAGE: Celebrating Women Artists Over 40 for the Women in Arts & Media Coalition and Union Women @ Work: Inspiration in Motion for Equity's Equal Employment Opportunity Committee, both in New York. Her work as an Officer and later Chair for The Rehearsal Club Alumnae Association, has served to launch the writing of a new musical, "Good Girls Only," written by Charles Leipart, the gathering of 25 original voices for a memoir book, "Cinderellas of West 53rd Street” and led the organization to incorporation in 2019.
