= Denise Lopez =

Denise Lopez may refer to:

- Denise Lopez (American singer), American singer and A&M Records artist in late 1980s/early 1990s
- Denise Lopez (Swedish singer), Swedish singer and DJ
