= Denise Ajayi-Williams =

Nigerian-American businesswoman and publisher

- Born: Nigeria
- Other names: Bolaji Ajayi; Bolaji Ajayi Williams
- Education: University of California, Riverside, Golden Gate University
- Occupations: Novelist, animator, short-story writer, entrepreneur
- Known for: Writing comics, journalism, philanthropy and activism
- Notable work: Akiti The Hunter (part I, 2015); Akiti The Hunter (part II, 2016)
- Spouse: Hayden Williams III
- Children: 1
- Parent: Chief Temitope Ajayi
- Website: www.akitithehunter.com

Denise Ajayi-Williams is the chief executive officer and co-founder of Silicon Valley-Nigerian Economic Development Inc. (SV-NED Inc.)

Denise holds board positions at five organizations: SV-NED Inc., Global Connection for Women Foundation, Sky Clinic Connect, Numly, and Collabful.

== Early life and education ==
Williams earned her bachelor's degree in Economics from the University of California, Riverside, and her Masters in Business Administration Degree with a concentration in Marketing from Golden Gate University, Ageno School of Business.

== Career ==
Denise Ajayi-Williams' work has been covered by Huffington Post. She hosted Nigerian cultural leader the Ooni of Ife during a Silicon Valley visit organized by SV-NED.

== Personal life ==
Ajayi married Hayden Williams III, the co-founder of their WM Journal platform and the website workingmomin20s.com. The couple has a son.
