= Marie-Denise Vriot =

French actress

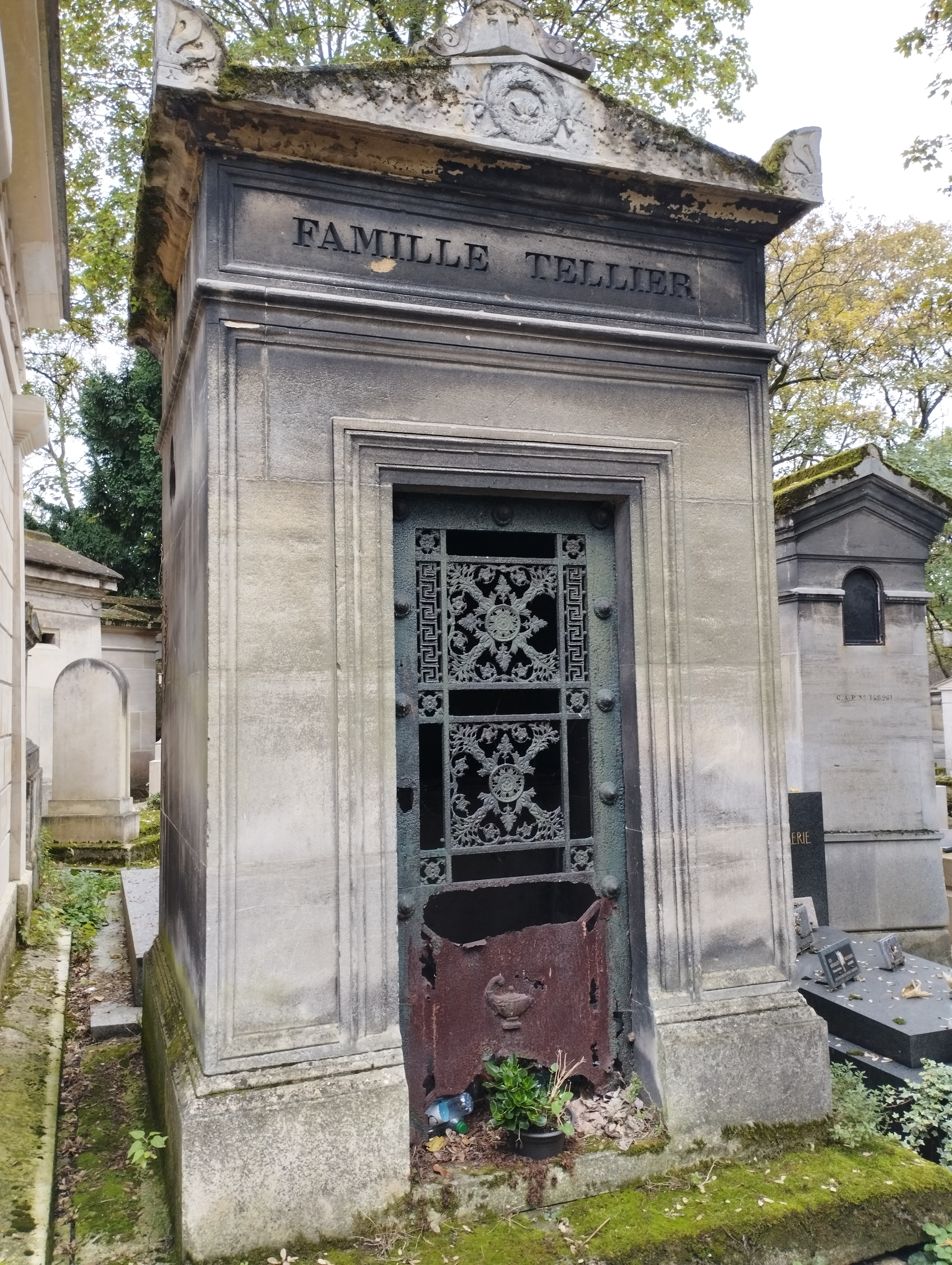
Tomb of Madame Suin

Marie–Denise Vriot (1742 – 1817), stage name Madame Suin, was a French stage actress.

She was engaged at the Comédie-Française in 1775. She became a Sociétaires of the Comédie-Française in 1776.

She mainly performed mother roles. She was also known as a cultivated and intellectual participator of the salon–culture in contemporary Paris. She was also deeply involved in the administration and economy of the Comédie–Française, and performed many assignments within the bookkeeping, economy and business affairs of the theatre.
