= Denise Mary Champion =

Australian Indigenous Christian minister

- Born: 1957 (age 68–69)
- Occupation: Uniting Church Deacon
- Known for: Indigenous Activist

Denise Mary Champion (born 1957) is an Aboriginal Australian deacon in the Uniting Church in Australia who serves as an outreach worker. She was the first Aboriginal woman from South Australia to be ordained in any Christian denomination.

== Early life and education ==
Denise Mary Champion is from the Adnyamathanha nation, from the Flinders Ranges in South Australia. Her Adnyamathanha name is Warrikhana, and she was the second-born in her family. Her father worked on a sheep station in Quorn when she was a young girl. She later moved to Adelaide to attend Norwood High School. For year twelve, she attended Port Augusta High School.

== Career ==
Champion married and moved with her husband to Melbourne, after he completed his studies for Christian ministry. In Melbourne, her husband worked with the Aboriginal Evangelical Fellowship. They then moved to Ceduna in South Australia, where they lived for five years.

Champion and her family then moved to Port Augusta, where she served as an outreach worker for the Uniting Church in Australia, through their Uniting Aboriginal and Islander Christian Congress (UAICC). Champion was ordained as a deacon in the Uniting Church on 20 June 2015. The ordination was held at the Adelaide West Uniting Church. She was the first Aboriginal woman in South Australia to be ordained to any Christian ministry.

Champion served in ministry at the South Australia UAICC congregation, which was established in 2002. She has also served as chair of the UAICC in South Australia. In 2015, she participated in the World Council of Churches sponsored ecumenical meeting in Sydney on mission and evangelisation. She has helped organise and lead cultural exchange programs between First and Second people in Australia. In 2020, Champion was awarded the degree of Doctor of Divinity (Honoris Causa) in recognition of her accomplishments as a Christian scholar and leader.

== Works ==
In 2014, Champion wrote a book entitled Yarta Wandatha, with Rosemary Dewerse. She uses storytelling as a method of theological reflection. It was self-published, and available through the Uniting Church South Australia. In 2021, Champion wrote Anaditj with Dewerse, again self-published.

== See also ==
- History of Indigenous Australians
- Uniting Church in Australia Synod of South Australia
