= Denese Oates =

Australian sculptor (born 1955)

Denese Oates (born 1955) is an Australian sculptor. She specialises in creating abstract forms from masses of intertwined copper wire; her work is held in the permanent collection at Parliament House, Canberra and the University of New South Wales.

== Biography ==
Oates was born in Orange, New South Wales. She later moved to Sydney to study at Alexander Mackie College (now the College of Fine Art at the University of New South Wales).

In 1979 Oates was a finalist for the Archibald Prize.
