= Denise Campbell =

Denise Campbell may refer to:

- Denise Campbell (footballer) (born 1979), English footballer
- Denise Campbell (politician) (born 1964), American politician
- Denise Andrea Campbell, Canadian equity activist
- Denise Campbell Bauer (born 1964), United States Ambassador to Belgium
