= Denise Wyss =

Swiss Old Catholic priestess

Denise Wyss (born 11 September 1965) is a Swiss Old Catholic priestess and counselor. She was the first woman to be ordained in the Old Catholic Church. Prior to her ordination to the priesthood in 2000, Wyss served as a deaconess.

== Biography ==
Wyss was born on 11 September 1965 and grew up in Solothurn. Wyss was raised in the Catholic faith. She graduated from high school in 1984 and went on to study Roman Catholic theology at the University of Lucerne from 1986 to 1988. She became uncomfortable with the hierarchical and patriarchal structure of the Catholic Church, later taking part in protests held by feminist students. Wyss did not identify with feminist theology, which she considered to be limiting. She later ended her studies and left the Catholic Church. In 1990, she converted to Old Catholicism and, in 1995, completed her theological studies with the Old Catholic Theological Faculty of the University of Bern. She was ordained as a deaconess in Solothurn in 1997 and passed her practical state examination in 1998. From 1998 to 2000, Wyss served as a parish leader at the Christ-Catholic parish in Trimbach and was a deaconess at the parish of Baden-Brugg in 1999.

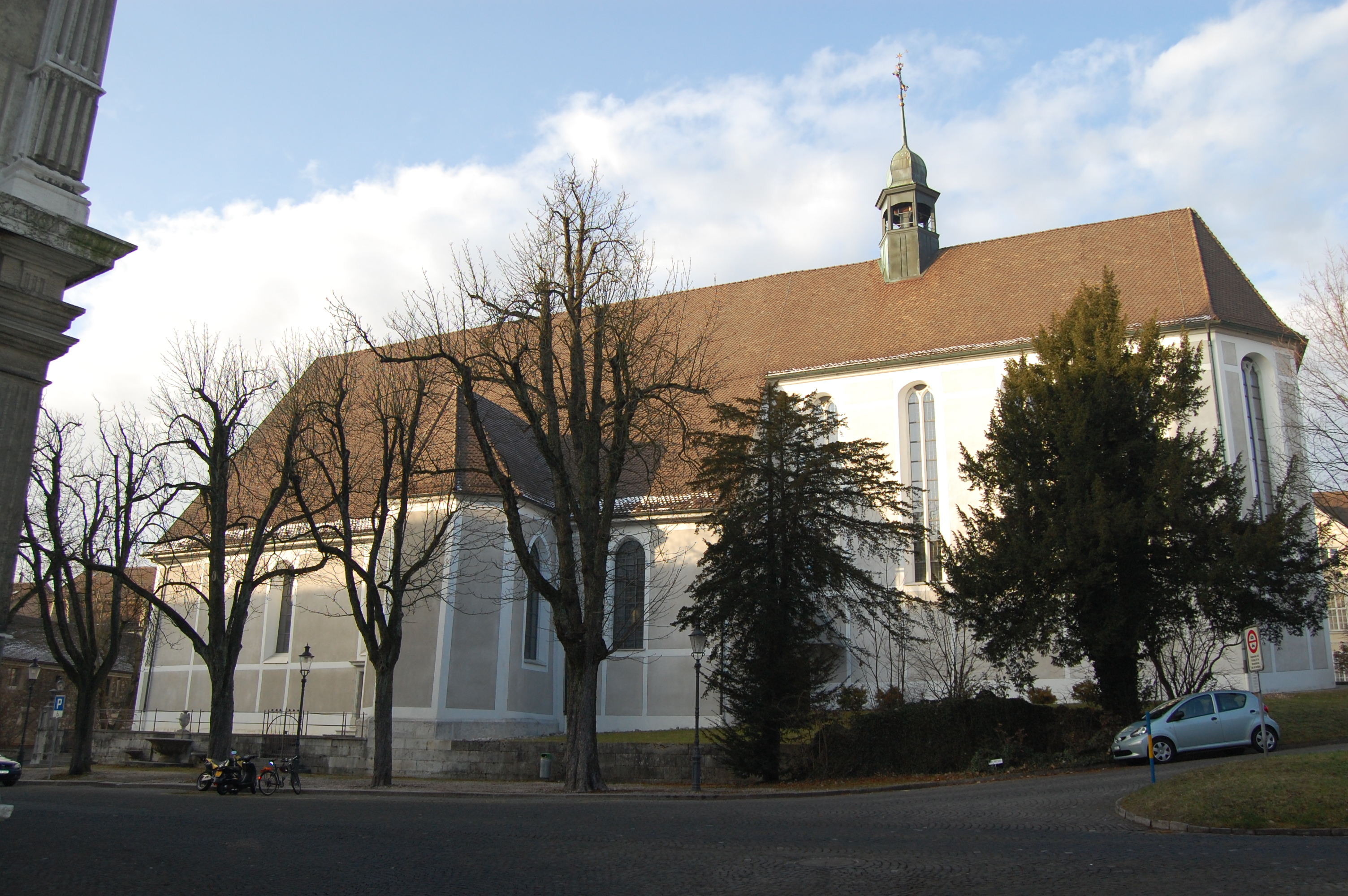
The Franziskanerkirche, where Wyss was ordained

On 19 February 2000 she was ordained as an Old Catholic priest in a mass at the Franziskanerkirche in Solothurn. She is the first woman to be ordained by the Old Catholic Church. She was ordained by Archbishop Antonius Jan Glazemaker.

In 2004, Wyss resigned from pastoral service in order to continue her education, but remained a member of the clergy. She started a practice as a psychological and spiritual counselor and, in 2007, resumed part-time duties as a priest in the Obermumpf-Wallbach parish. On 1 November 2008, she was appointed as a pastor in the Laufen parish. In July 2014, Wyss became the pastor of the Christ-Catholic parish of Baselland. She is an advocate for ecumenism.
