= Denise Morel =

French writer and psychiatrist

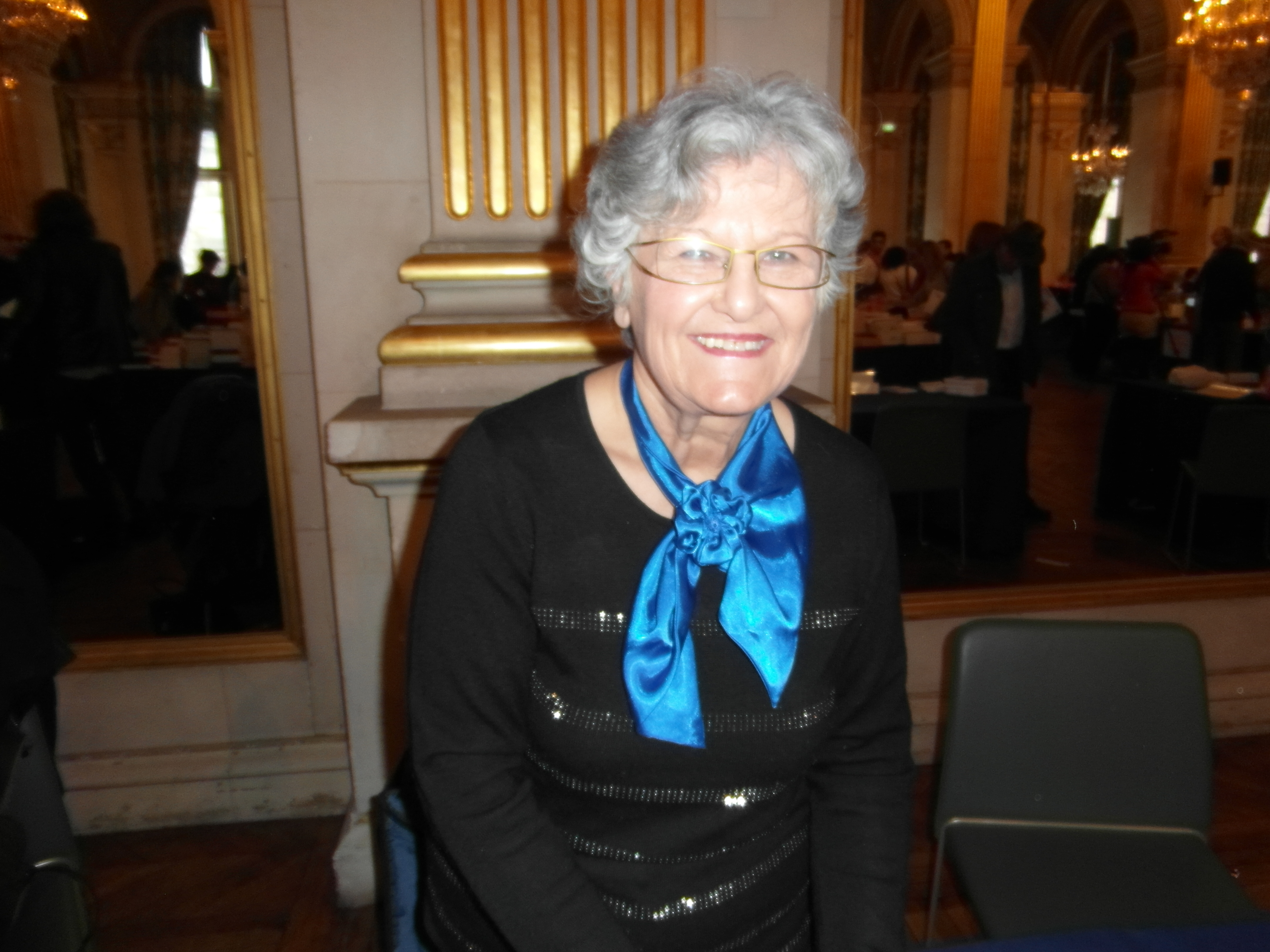
Denise Morel in 2014

Denise Morel (born 10 August 1946) is a French writer and psychiatrist. She was born in Setif, Algeria, the youngest of four children. Between the ages of 8 and 14, she lived in Bône. The family left Algeria in 1961 to live in Marseille. She studied in Aix-en-Provence and Paris, obtaining a PhD in clinical psychology from Université Paris V.

She has written numerous books, among them Setif de ma jeunesse, a well-regarded memoir of growing up in Setif. Her ancestors were of Swiss and Maltese origin. She studied religion for a few years in Lyon.

== Selected works ==
- 2018 - Qui est Dieu ?, Les impliqués/L'Harmattan, Paris.
- 2016 - Souffle divin.
- 2016 - Symphonie versaillaise, textes sur Versailles, écrits en atelier d'écriture,
- 2014 - Le Voyage des Mots, El Ibriz, Alger.
- 2013 - Terre aimée, Algérie, El Ibriz, Alger.
- 2012 - L'Animal medium, Edilivre.
- 2011 - Dialogue avec mon cancer, Éditions du Cerf.
- 2007 - Une Mère de papier, Scriban.
- 2006 - Les Brodeuses de l’Histoire, Éditions Coop Breizh.
- 2005 - 12 étapes pour écrire votre livre, Scriban.
- 2005 - Energie des hiéroglyphes, Scriban.
- 2004 - Cette année je me prends au mot et j'écris !, Diateino.
- 2004 - Avec Sekhmet, Scriban.
- 2003 - Secrets d’écrivain, Éditions Diateino.
- 2003 - Pour ne plus rester victime, Scriban.
- 2001 - Sétif de ma jeunesse, Éditions Gandini.
- 2001 - Symboles et couleurs, co-auteur : M. Feller, Scriban.
- 1999 - À l’aube, Scriban.
- 1997 - Célébration de l’écriture, Cité de l’Écriture.
- 1994 - Les Enfants de Pitchipoï, France-Empire
- 1991 - Qui est vivant ? Éditions Dervy.
- 1989 - Le Pays de l’étrange, Éditions Papyrus.
- 1988 - Porter un talent, porter un symptôme; familles créatrices, Éditions Universitaires.
- 1984 - Cancer et psychanalyse, Éditions Belfond.
