= Denise Brown =

Denise Brown may refer to:

- Denise Brown (athlete) (born 1955), British athlete
- Denise Brown (UN official) (born 1963), Canadian official with the UN World Food Programme
- Denise Scott Brown (born 1931), American architect
- Denise Brown, elder sister of Nicole Brown Simpson who advocated for Nicole after Nicole's death
