= Denise O'Neil Green =

American academic

Denise O’Neil Green
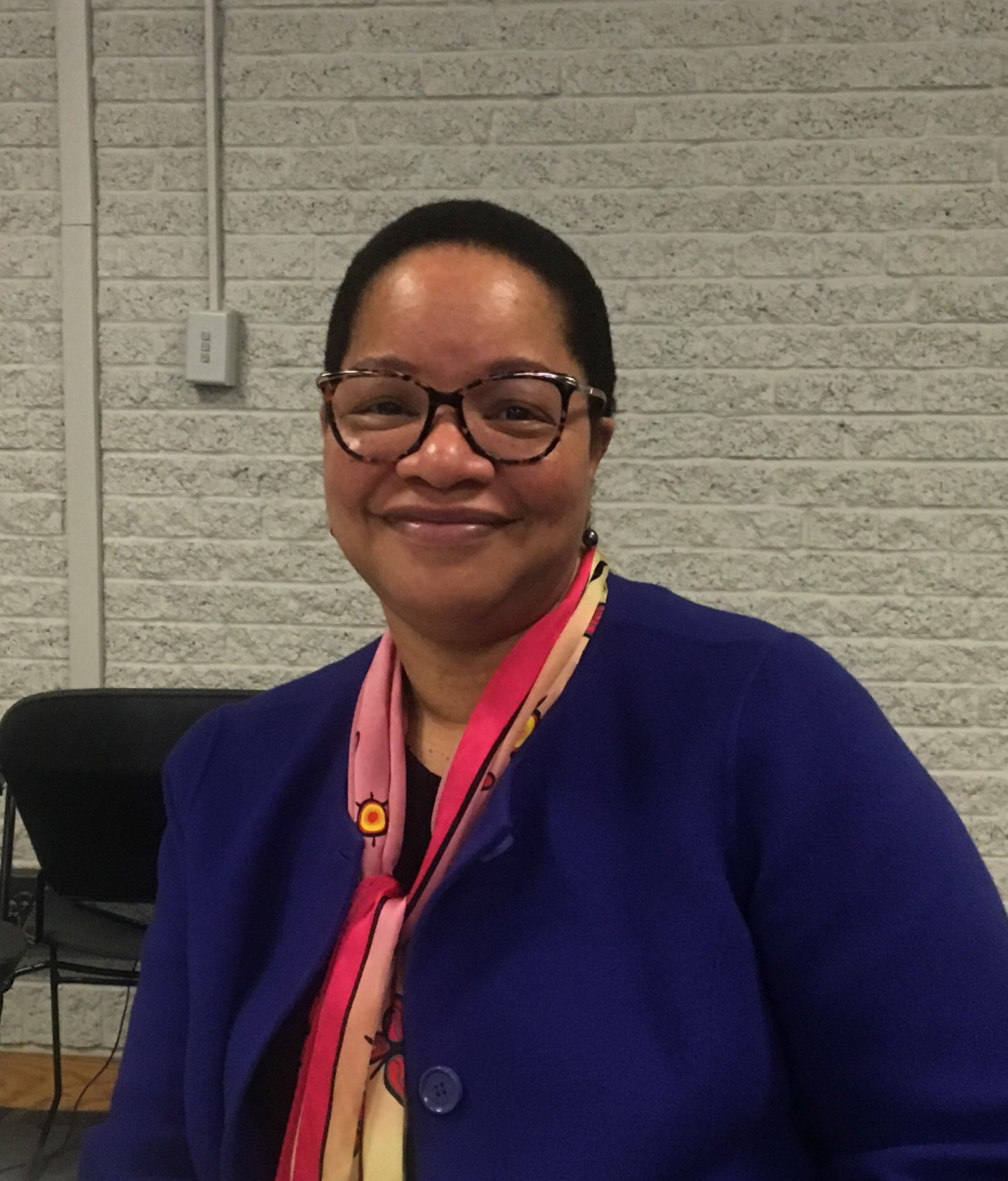
- Dr. Denise O'Neil Green in February 2019
- Occupations: Vice-president, Equity and Community Inclusion

Academic background
- Education: BSc, MA, PhD
- Alma mater: University of Michigan, Ann Arbor
- Thesis: Conflict, community, and affirmative action: An examination of the University of Michigan's campus response to anti-affirmative action litigation. (2002)

Academic work
- Discipline: Equity Studies
- Institutions: Toronto Metropolitan University
- Notable works: 100 Accomplished Black Canadian Women

Denise O'Neil Green is an American academic, and currently the Vice-president, Equity and Community Inclusion at Toronto Metropolitan University (formerly Ryerson University), Toronto. She took up the position in April 2017, after serving as the inaugural Assistant Vice-president/Vice-provost Equity, Diversity and Inclusion at Toronto Metropolitan University, becoming the first person to hold this rank of senior leadership in Canadian higher education. Ryerson was the first Canadian university to create such a position. Green has been recognized nationally for her leadership in with several honours and awards.

Prior to her position in Canadian higher education Green was Associate Vice-President for Institutional Diversity at Central Michigan University, USA. Her scholarly research has focused on race-conscious or positive discrimination policies in higher education, access for under-represented students and qualitative research methodologies.

== Biography ==
Green grew up in Chicago, Illinois, USA. She earned a bachelor's degree from the University of Chicago, and a master's degree from Princeton University. She completed a PhD in higher education and public policy at the University of Michigan, Ann Arbor in 2002.

Prior to joining Central Michigan University, Green was a faculty member at the University of Illinois, Urbana-Champaign and before that, an assistant professor of educational psychology in the College of Education and Human Sciences at the University of Nebraska–Lincoln. She was also a program director for the University of Michigan's Pathways to Student Success and Excellence Program.

== Research ==
Green has authored over 70 journal articles, book chapters, reports and conference papers. In 2016 she co-authored 100 Accomplished Black Canadian Women and the updated edition in 2018.

Green is active across the Canadian Higher Education sector in advocating best practices and policy on DEI/EDI. She is a frequent speaker on equity at universities and conferences. She was recently interviewed by the Christian Science Monitor about the global Black Lives Matter protests that erupted in response to the murder of George Floyd, stating that it is common a myth that racism does not exist in Canada.

At Toronto Metropolitan University, Green led the Truth and Reconciliation Commission Community Consultation. At Central Michigan University, Green co-authored a chapter in the 2010 book, Implementing Diversity: Contemporary Challenges and Best Practices at Predominantly White Universities.

== Statements ==
=== On DEI/EDI ===
Green stated that upon coming to Canada, she observed "Canada, across a number of different sectors, was 20 years behind, if not more, in doing EDI (DEI) work". In 2021, Green wrote that "I agree with Princeton Professor Dr. Eddie Glaude that whiteness and its supremacy must be renounced by white folks, otherwise how can a reset in the EDI space even be possible."

=== On White Supremacy ===
On the responsibility of white people to unlearn supremacy, Green stated "Just because you are racialized does not mean you are immune to anti-Black, anti-Indigenous and racist attitudes. It actually means that you are going to have to work harder to challenge the power and influence of white supremacy that leads to internalized oppression and lateral violence."

== Honours and awards ==
- 2017 President's Blue and Gold Award of Excellence, Ryerson University.
- 2016 Skills for Change - Pioneers for Change Award for Women in Leadership. This award recognizes remarkable contributions made by immigrants in Canada
- 2016 Named as one of 100 Accomplished Black Canadian Women
- 2015 Named as a Women Worth Watching by Profiles in Diversity Journal.

== Selected publications ==
- Green, D.O. (2018), Integrating Equity, Diversity, and Inclusion into the DNA of Public Universities: Reflections of a Chief Diversity Officer, Campus Diversity Triumphs (Diversity in Higher Education, Vol. 20), Emerald Publishing Limited, pp. 185-199. https://doi.org/10.1108/S1479-364420180000020016.
- Green, D. (2006), Historically underserved students: What we know, what we still need to know. New Directions for Community Colleges. 2006(135):21-28. https://doi.org/10.1002/cc.244.
- Kim, E. and Green, D.O. (2012), Using qualitative methods to understand the experiences of female Korean doctoral students: Mining gender and racial stereotypes. pp. 237-256 in Nagata, D.K., Kohn-Wood, L., and Suzuki, L.A. (eds). Qualitative strategies for ethnocultural research. American Psychological Association.
- Klymyshyn, A.M.U., Green, D.O. and Richardson, C. (2010), Diversity at Central Michigan University: A Case Study of Achieving Diversity at a Predominantly White Public University. pp. 125-143. Neville, H.A., Browne Huntt, M., and Chapa, J. (eds). Implementing Diversity: Contemporary Challenges and Best Practices at Predominantly White Universities
- Green, D. (2008). Categories. In L. M. Given (Ed.), The SAGE encyclopedia of qualitative research methods. pp. 72-72. Thousand Oaks, CA: SAGE Publications, Inc. doi:10.4135/9781412963909.n40
