= Denise Masson =

French islamologist

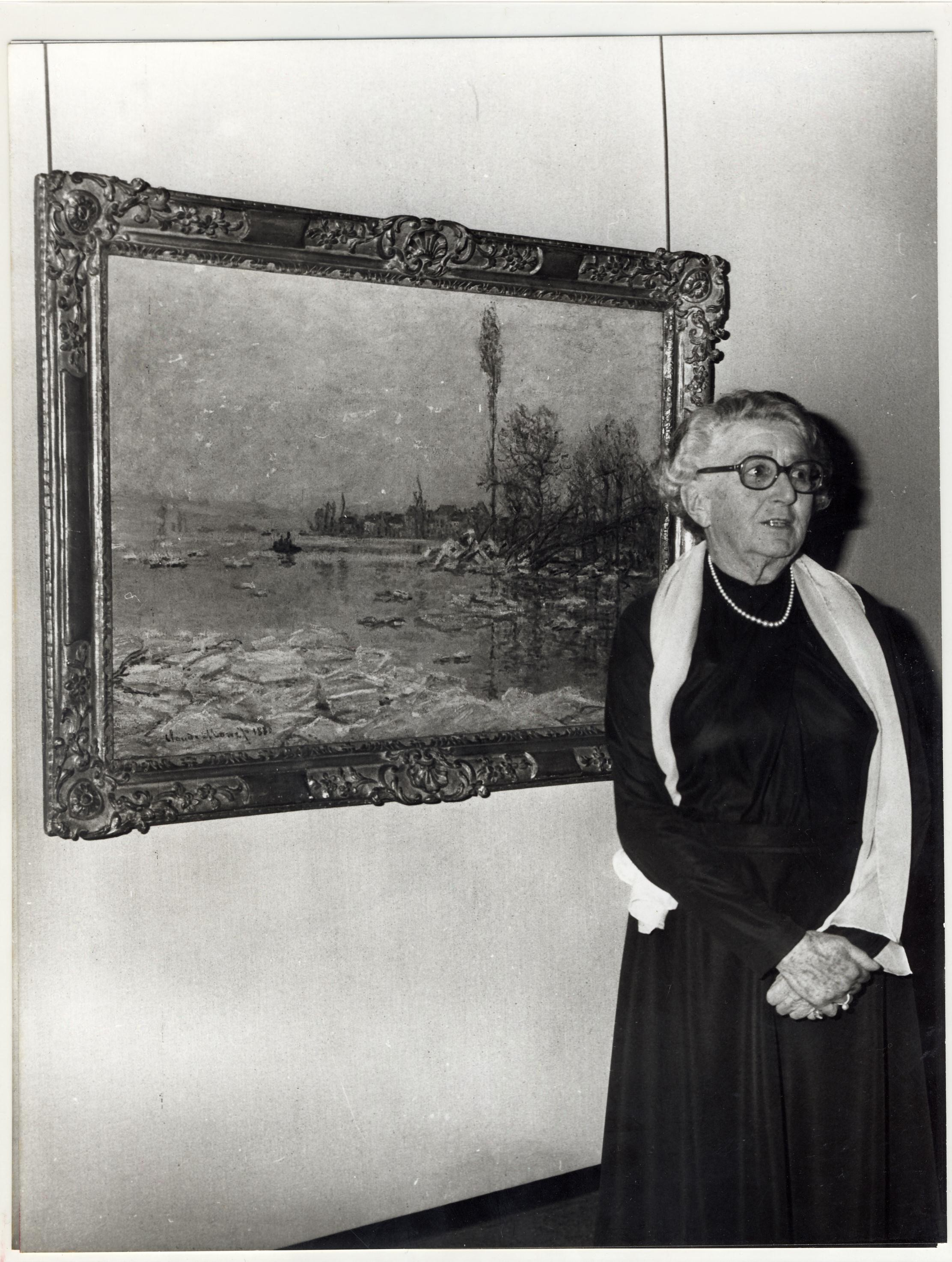
- Portrait of donor Denise Masson (1901-1994) in front of the painting by Claude Monet, "La Débâcle".
- Born: 5 August 1901; Paris
- Died: 10 November 1994 (aged 93); Marrakech
- Occupations: Islamologist; Translator

Denise Masson (5 August 1901 – 10 November 1994), nicknamed "the Lady of Marrakech", was a 20th-century French islamologist who translated the Quran from Arabic into French, published in 1967. According to her colleague André Chouraqui, she may have been inspired by the Latin translation of Louis Maracci (1698), repeated by Christian Reineccius.

== Publications ==
- 1958: Le Coran et la révélation judéo-chrétienne, Études comparées (in French). Paris: A. Maisonneuve..
- 1967: Le Coran, Gallimard
- 1980: Le Coran (in French). Paris: Gallimard. 1967. p. 1223. ISBN 207010009X. Bibliothèque de la Pléiade.
- 1986: L'eau, le feu et la lumière, d'après la Bible, le Coran et les traditions (in French). Paris: Éditions Desclée de Brouwer. p. 186. ISBN 2-220-02549-7.
- 1986: Les trois voies de l'unique. Ordinaire (in French). Paris: Desclée De Brouwer. 1983. ISBN 2-220-02436-9.
- 1988: Monothéisme coranique et monothéisme biblique (in French). Paris: Desclée De Brouwer. ISBN 2-220-02046-0.
- 1989: Porte ouverte sur un jardin fermé: Valeurs fondamentales et traditionnelles d'une société en pleine évolution: Marrakech, 1930-1989. Iles (in French). Paris: Desclée De Brouwer. 1989. p. 337. ISBN 2-220-03059-8. Autobiography.
