= Denise Fujiwara =

Canadian dancer and choreographer

Denise Fujiwara is a Canadian dancer and choreographer. She created Fujiwara Dance Inventions and co-founded the CanAsian International Dance Festival.

== Life ==
Fujiwara started her career as a member of the Canadian rhythmic gymnastics team. Her mother performed in a modern dance company, and introduced her to modern dance as way to express her voice.

She joined the dance program at York University and practiced classical ballet, modern and contemporary dance.

== Career ==
In 1978, Fujiwara found the collective Toronto Independent Dance Enterprise (TIDE) together with other choreographers. She created Fujiwara Dance Inventions in 1991 to develop her solo projects.

In 1993, she began practicing butoh with master choreographer and performer Nakajima Natsu.

== Works ==
- Sumida River: choreographed by created by Nakajima Natsu and performed by Denise Fujiwara. This solo established Fujiwara as "a senior solo dance artist and butoh practitioner".
- Komachi: choreography by Yukio Waguri. This was Fujiwara's "second major butoh work"
- Eunoia: multimedia dance work based on Christian Bök's Griffin book of the same name.
