= Denise Houphouët-Boigny =

Ivorian academic and diplomat

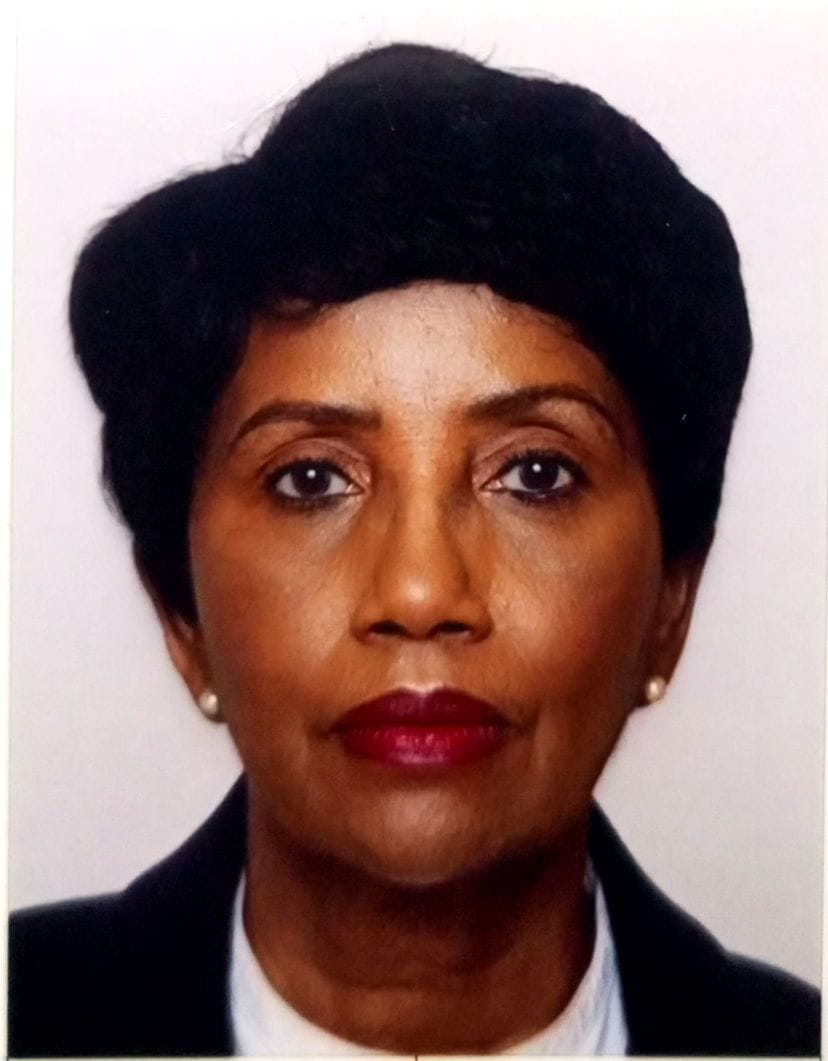
Denise Houphouët-Boigny

Denise Houphouët-Boigny is an Ivorian academic and diplomat currently serving as Cote d'Ivoire's ambassador to UNESCO. She is a Doctor of Science and professor of mineral chemistry. She is a member of the Academy of Sciences, Arts, Cultures of Africa and African Diasporas of Côte d'Ivoire.

== Education ==
Houphouët-Boigny earned DUES-PC2 in 1972 and a master’s degree in Chemistry in 1974 before obtaining a DES in physical sciences in 1976 and a doctorate in physical sciences in 1984.

== Career ==
She began her academic career at the National School of Public Works in Abidjan from 1975 to 1977 and later transferred to Laboratory of Inorganic Materials Chemistry of the UFR Satière Structural Sciences and Technologies as a teacher-researcher. She was an assistant professor at the University of Cocody in Côte d'Ivoire from 1985 to 1993 when she became a full professor. she was a member of the Scientific Council of the Faculty of Sciences and Techniques 1993 from 1996 before being appointed to the position of Director of Higher Education in the Ministry of higher education of Côte d'Ivoire from 1996 to 2006. She was appointed Permanent Delegate of the Republic of Côte d'Ivoire to UNESCO since 2011 and became a member of the Bureau of the General Conference of UNESCO since 2019.

== Honors ==
- Officer in the National Order of Côte d'Ivoire,
- Commander in the Order of the National Education of Côte d'Ivoire,
- Knight in the Order of the French Legion of Honor.
