= Aethalides (mythology) =

In Greek mythology, Aethalides (/ɪˈθælɪdiːz, iːˈθælɪdiːz/; Ancient Greek: Αἰθαλίδης, romanized: Aithalides, lit. 'son of the soot-colored' or 'smoky one') was the name shared by two personages:

- Aethalides, one of the Tyrrhenian sailors who tried to delude Dionysus. He was turned into a dolphin by the god.
- Aethalides, one of the Argonauts and son of Hermes and Eupolemeia, daughter of King Myrmidon of Phthia.
