= Apollonia (Illyria) =

Archaeological park in Albania

- Ἀπολλωνία (Ancient Greek)
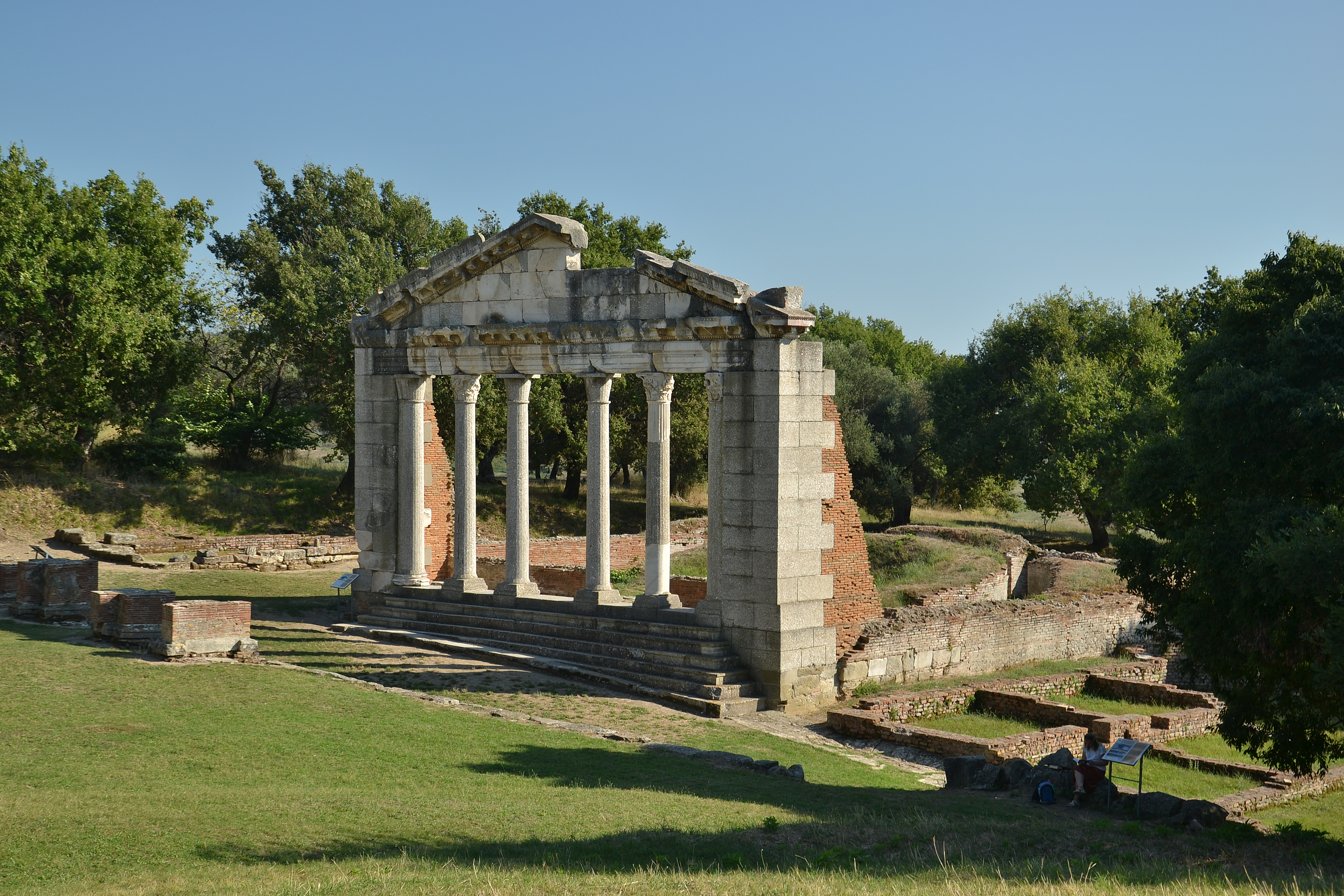
- The Monument of Agonothetes, built in the 2nd century BC and used as the municipal council building in the Roman era

- Location in Albania
- 40°43′19″N 19°28′21″E
- Type: Settlement
- Periods: Archaic, Classical, Hellenistic, Roman
- Cultures: Ancient Greek, Roman
- Location: Fier County, Albania (near Pojan)

History
- Built: c. 600 BC
- Abandoned: 4th century AD

Site notes
- Excavation dates: 1916–1918; 1924–1938; from 1948 onward
- Condition: In ruins
- Management: Government of Albania
- Public access: Yes

Designations
- Designation: Archaeological Park of Apollonia (since 2003)

Apollonia (Ancient Greek, Koine Greek: Ἀπολλωνία; demonym: Ἀπολλωνιάτης, Apolloniates; Latin: Apollonia) was an Ancient Greek trade colony which developed into an independent polis, and later a Roman city, in southern Illyria. It was located on the right bank of the Aoös/Vjosë river, approximately 10 km from the eastern coast of the Adriatic Sea. Its ruins are situated in the county of Fier, close to the village of Pojan, in Albania.

Apollonia was perhaps the most important of the several classical towns of the same name. It was founded around 600 BC by Greek colonists from Corinth and possibly Corcyra, who established a trading settlement on a largely abandoned coastal site by invitation of the local Illyrians. Corinthian colonial policy seems to have been relatively liberal, focused on resource extraction for the support of their homeland, rather than exploitation or expulsion of the local Illyrian population. Apollonia gradually gained political independence from Corinth and was organized as a polis under an oligarchic system. Aristotle describes Apollonia's oligarchy as a small Greek elite class, largely descended from the original colonists, ruling over a largely local Illyrian population.

From the second century BC Apollonia allied itself with the Roman Republic, which maintained a Legionary base there for a time. The city flourished in the Roman period, housing a renowned school of Greek philosophy, rhetoric, and military training which attracted students from across the empire. Augustus, the first Roman emperor, studied at Apollonia in his youth. The city began to decline in the 3rd century AD when its harbour started silting up as a result of an earthquake. It was abandoned in the 4th century AD.

The name of the city is mentioned among the modern bishoprics of the Orthodox Autocephalous Church of Albania (Apollonia and Fier). Apollonia is also a titular see of the Latin Church. The ruins were designated as an archaeological park on 7 April 2003 by the government of Albania.

== Name ==
The settlement was initially known as Gylakeia (Ancient Greek: Γυλάκεια) after its founder, Gylax. Apart from one inscription and a mention by Stephanus of Byzantium there is no other information which has been preserved about him. Gylax may have been a tyrant closely linked to the ruling dynasty of Corinthian tyrant Periander. The decision to change the name of the settlement can be possibly dated to the collapse of the Corinthian tyranny when the settlement was possibly refounded as Apollonia by a faction which opposed the Corinthian establishment. The name Apollonia appears in 588 BC and is a reference to Apollo.

It was one of 24 cities in the Ancient Greek world known as Apollonia. It was distinguished from other cities named Apollonia by being referred to as Ἀπολλωνία κατ᾿ Ἐπίδαμνον (Apollonia kat' Epidamnon) or Ἀπολλωνία πρὸς Ἐπίδαμνον (Apollonia pros Epidamnon), meaning "Apollonia towards Epidamnos," in reference to the nearby Greek colony of Epidamnos.

== History ==
=== Pre-foundation period ===
The site of Apollonia occupied a strategic position within southern Illyria because it was located at the crossroads of a prehistoric trade route, which both linked the eastern Adriatic coast with the interior, and the northern Adriatic with the Aegean. The route into the interior, which was the more valuable because it permitted overland travel elsewhere in the region, existed before the arrival of Greek colonists, and later it became the Roman Via Egnatia. Before the foundation of Apollonia, the Greek goods that moved inland along this route were very few.

The presence of indigenous Illyrian human remains recovered from a burial mound in the necropolis of Apollonia indicates that the initial inhabitation of the region of Apollonia began during the Early Bronze Age. The presence of the Early Bronze Age tumuli shows that Illyrians viewed Apollonia as a part of their territory. The earliest EBA tumulus dates to 2679±174 calBCE (2852-2505 calBCE). These burial mounds belong to the southern expression of the Adriatic-Ljubljana culture (related to Cetina culture) which moved southwards along the Adriatic from the northern Balkans. The same community built similar mounds in Montenegro (Rakića Kuće) and northern Albania (Shtoj). A part of the grave finds of the Adriatic tumuli included locally produced violin idols which were influenced by trends observed in the Early Cycladic I (Grotta-Pelos) culture in southern Greece. Surface surveys of the region suggest that there was very little general use of the area until the colonial establishment.

The first post-Mycenaean Greek mariners and traders in the Adriatic were the Euboeans, who interpreted the foreign coast of this sea in ways that were comfortable to them. It has been conjectured that at the site of Apollonia, in particular, those early Greek seafarers encountered a deserted landscape with abandoned tumuli interpreting them as monuments to their Homeric ancestors. Archaeological evidence shows that in the hinterland of Apollonia the earliest Greek pottery dates from the middle of the 7th century BC and is solely Corinthian. A Corinthian Type A transport amphora that is dated to between the third and last quarter of the 7th century BC, also prior to the foundation of the colony, was discovered inside a tumulus, confirming pre-colonial interaction for the site of Apollonia.

The local population's density before the establishment of the colony is debated. When Greek colonists arrived, there were no indigenous people inhabiting in the immediate vicinity of Apollonia, or, if a native settlement in and around Apollonia existed at all, it was very limited. Despite an ancient tradition preserved by Stephanus of Byzantium that the site was first settled by Illyrians there is yet no clear evidence that it was settled by a non-Greek population before the arrival of the Greek colonists. Traces of Iron Age non-Greek ceramics dating back to the pre-colonial period are very few. Such a pattern appears to conform to a gently trodden landscape, which likely was occupied only seasonally by Illyrians, as one should expect from an area inhabited by people who were organized in tribes.

=== Foundation and Archaic period ===
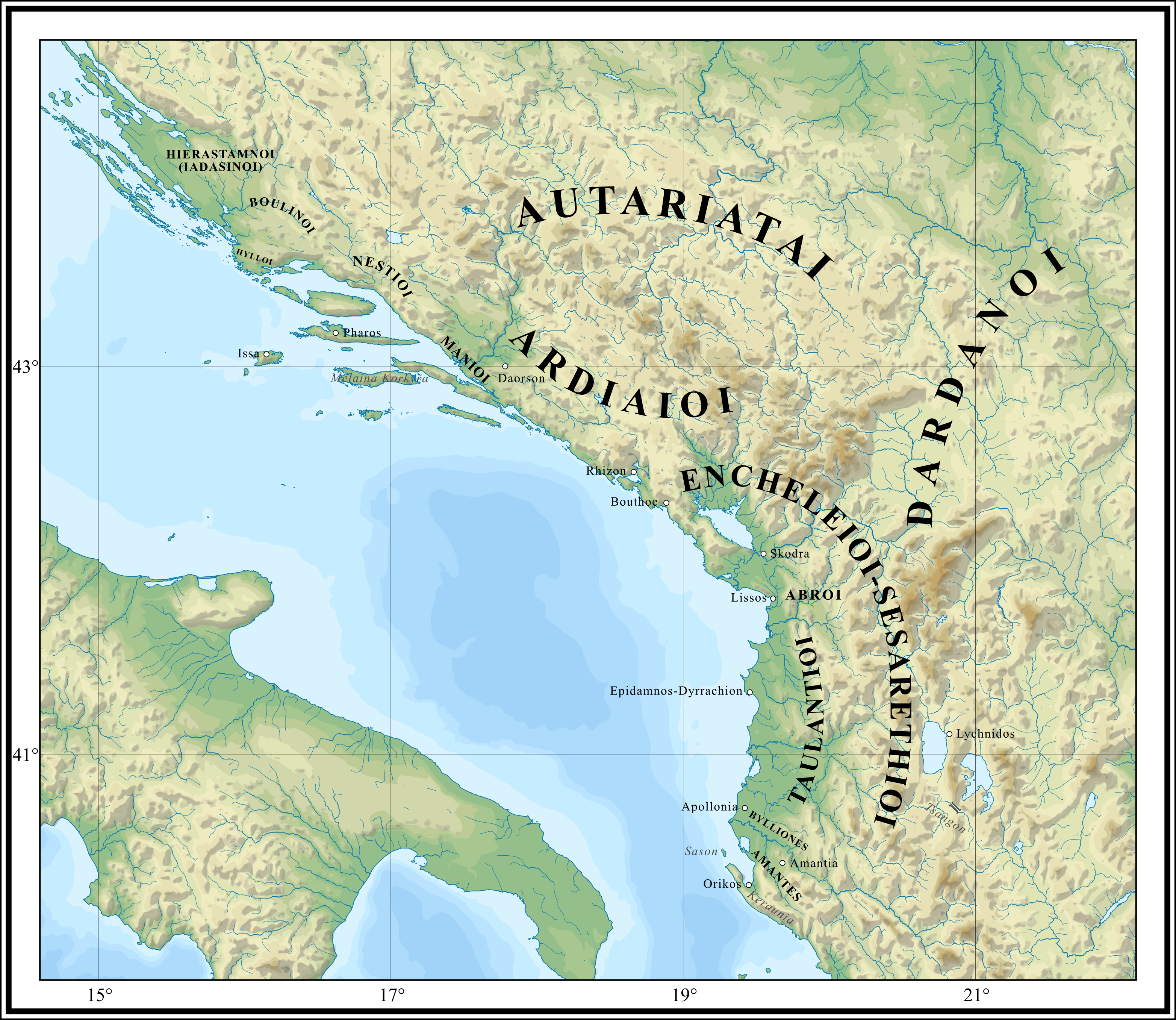
Apollonia and approximate Illyrian tribal distribution in the 7th-4th centuries BC.

The colony at Apollonia was founded by a group of 200 Corinthians led by the oikist Gylax to an already existing trading post around 600 BC. J. J. Wilkes reports that Corinth is said to have responded to an Illyrian invitation. According to N.G.L. Hammond they established good relations with the local Illyrians founding a joint settlement with a riverine harbor on the Aoos/Vjosë, which emerged as an important trade center. Stocker (2009) states that all textual evidence suggests otherwise, while McIlvaine et al. (2013) and Kyle et al. (2016) quotes Hammond's suggestion. Stallo (2007) states that the Corinthians and Corcyreans were recruited by the Illyrian Taulantii, cooperating in the establishment of the colony. According to Picard (2013) there is no doubt that the small number of the colonizers enabled the Illyrians the opportunity to prevent the colonial settlement in the area if they wished, hence Apollonia was necessarily founded with the approval of the natives, certainly because of trade advantages the colonizers could grant them. The first colonizers were followed by others particularly from Corcyra. According to Wilkes (1995) the site was located on the territory of the Illyrian Taulantii, while according to Hammond (1997) and Stocker (2009) it was probably located on the border between the Taulantii (and/or Parthini) to the north and the Bylliones to the east; both authors stated that the colonists probably took advantage of the enmity between those two supposedly rival Illyrian tribes.

Apollonia and Epidamnos apparently were the only Greek colonies founded in the Adriatic Sea during the Archaic era, and the only colonies established in Illyria by mainland Greeks. Apollonia in particular was one of the last colonies founded in the west by mainland Greeks during the Archaic colonization. The placement was chosen because it occupied a strategic position at trade crossroads north–south along the eastern Adriatic coast and east–west with the interior of Illyria and Macedonia; across the Straits of Otranto it was also close to the Italian coast; furthermore it was suitable for a riverine port on the shore of the Aoos, and there was also the presence of quality pastureland and scarcity of indigenous settlements in the immediate hinterland of the asty. The polis was located on a significant cultural border between Chaonia (the northernmost part of Epirus) and Illyria.

One of the early actions of the settlers was to bring under their control a hill to the southeast of Apollonia, which the Illyrian tribes used as grazing grounds. The settlers proceeded to exploit the hill by taxing the Illyrian pastoralists for its use. According to most scholars, relations between the colonists and locals were friendly and mutually beneficial. Apollonia grew following its foundation, although it remained modest in size until Hellenistic times. The Corinthian colonial policy appears to have been relatively liberal, and was geared towards resource extraction so as to support the growing Corinthian population, rather than violent expulsion or exploitation of the local Illyrian population. Though Corinth obtained benefits from colonization that resulted in health improvements for their population, the health of Apollonia deteriorated after the colonial establishment as a result of urbanization, poor sanitation, and exposure to new pathogens due to increased interaction with Mediterranean traders. Illyrians and Corinthians coexisted during the colonial period, and the low rate of skeletal trauma at Apollonia indicates that ethnic relations were peaceful.

Compared to pre-colonial Illyrians and ancient Greeks from Corinth, archaeo-demographic studies show that the population of Apollonia grouped more with the Illyrian population of pre-colonial Lofkënd; this indicates that pre-colonial Illyrians constitute an important genetic contribution to the population of colonial Apollonia. About 90% of the population of Apollonia was phenotypically closer to Illyrians than to ancient Greek Corinthians. Archaeological findings corroborate that Illyrian customs were still used in Apollonia after the foundation of the colony and cultural fusion and/or intermarriage between Illyrians and ancient Greeks took place in the site.

Apollonia in Illyria developed to become one of the most important urban centres in the wider region and played a major role as a trade gateway to the central Balkans. Apollonia, like Dyrrachium further north, became an important port on the Illyrian coast as the most convenient link between Brundusium and northern Greece, and as one of the western starting points of the Via Egnatia leading east to Thessaloniki and Byzantium in Thrace. It had its own mint, stamping coins showing a cow suckling her calf on the obverse and a double stellate pattern on the reverse, which have been found as far away as the basin of the Danube.

=== Classical period ===
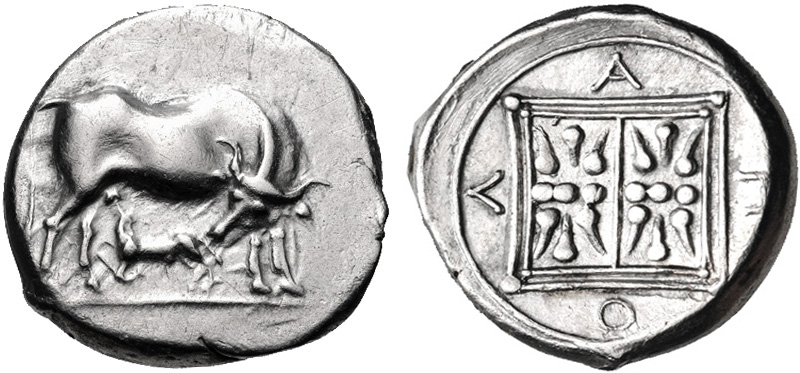
A 4th-3rd century BC silver stater from Apollonia bearing the inscription ΑΠΟΛ.

Apollonia began to mint its own coins in the 5th century BC.

In c. 450 BC the territory of Apollonia was expanded towards the south after the victory of the Apollonians in Thronion on the borders of the land of the indigenous tribe of Amantes, in the coastal area of the Bay of Aulon. By conquering Thronion, the Apolloniates had achieved two goals: they had substantially enlarged their territory towards the Illyrian hinterland and had also acquired a profitable source of money. It gave the Apolloniates control over the lower valley of the Shushicë river, a tributary of the Aoös (modern Vjosa), and consolidated their control over the sanctuary of Nymphaion and the area of the bitumen mines of present-day Selenicë, located to the east of the confluence of the Shushicë into the Aoös. Through that expansion Apollonia benefitted from the exploitation of new fertile lands. With the spoils of Thronion, the Apolloniates erected a monument at Olympia celebrating their victory and conquest. This turn may have also been the result of Apollonia's increasing power towards nearby Epirote lands. Apollonian land was bounded on the south-east by the territory of the Bylliones. In this early era, Apollonia began to expand to the south of the Aous valley and incorporporated in the function of its economy other Greek colonists and natives who lived in this area. The social hierarchy didn't change and both native Illyrians and the unprivileged colonists to the south of Aous joined the lower classes of the expanded territory of Apollonia. This relatively fixed colonial division may have brought socially closer the native Illyrians and the colonists of the lower classes.

Herodotus and Conon relate an anecdote concerning a man named Evenius or Peithenius, who was tasked with guarding the sheep sacred to Helios, but wolves attacked and devoured the animals. Evenius said nothing and planned on buying other sheep to make up for the loss, but the other Apollonians soon found out and gouged out his eyes. A famine then broke out as the earth ceased to bear fruit, because of Helios' wrath; the soil grew fertile again only after the Apollonians consulted the Oracle of Delphi and compensated the blinded man with property, while the gods gave him the gift of prophecy. This little anecdote attest to the divine introduction of prophecy, rather than a real biographical event.

=== Hellenistic period ===
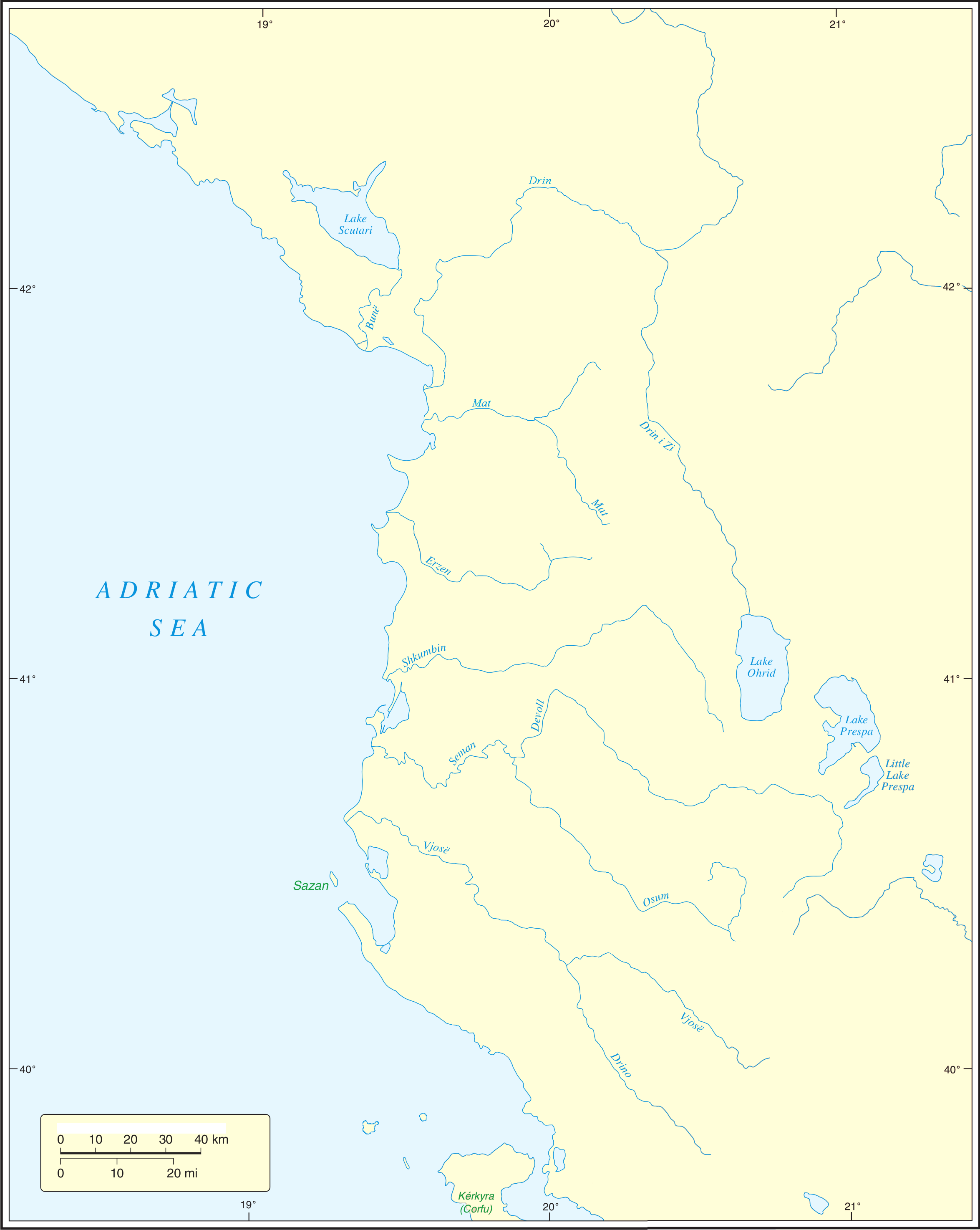

In Hellenistic times Apollonia experienced significant growth of its population, increase in urbanisation and in large-scale trade networks. It is estimated that at its peak the city had about 60,000 inhabitants. Apollonia was located on a strategic position as a river-port and dominated over a vast plain that stretches c. 10 km in length. Strabo in his Geographica describes Apollonia as a well-governed, self-governing polis presumably from its inception. Aristotle considers (Aristotle:4.3.8) the Apollonian government as a narrow oligarchy, and that the polis consisted of citizens descended from original Greek colonists with power and offices filled by the local elite. According to Aristotle, the original Greek colonists and their descendants were "few out of the many" who held a privileged status over a population largely composed of local Illyrians. Whether local Illyrians were integrated as serfs in the economy of the city or whether they were slaves remains unclear, although the former is more likely. As such only direct descendants of the first Corinthian settlers had access to the politeia and therefore the magistracy. Aristotle uses the term eleutheroi or freemen to refer to citizens who enjoyed such rights. Such a social system suggests a strict endogamy and it was preserved three centuries after the foundation of the city. The aristocratic society of Apollonia maintained its special links with its metropolis, Corinth, for a long time. As such epigraphic evidence points that the prytans maintained Greek names proof that the memories of the first colonists were preserved by the local aristocracy. Contrary to nearby Epidamnus, Apollonia pursued xenelasia, the expulsion of foreigners deemed injurious to the public welfare, similar to that used in Lacedaemonian law.

During the 3rd century B.C the hinterland of Apollonia was inhabited by a population that used non-indigenous ceramics. This suggests that the material culture of the neighbouring Illyrians had become hellenized since at that time all products are classified as Greek ones. The city grew rich on the slave trade and local agriculture, as well as its large harbour, said to have been able to hold a hundred ships at a time. The city also benefited from the local supply of asphalt which was a valuable commodity in ancient times, for example for caulking ships. The remains of a late sixth-century temple, located just outside the city, were reported in 2006; it is only the fifth known stone temple found in present-day Albania. Later in the Hellenistic period the economy of Apollonia adopted a more dispersed farmstead approach. Whether this expansion was the result of conquest, expansion, assimilation of local indigenous groups or cooperation between colonists and indigenous groups this is unclear. The city was for a time included among the dominions of Pyrrhus of Epirus.

=== Roman period ===
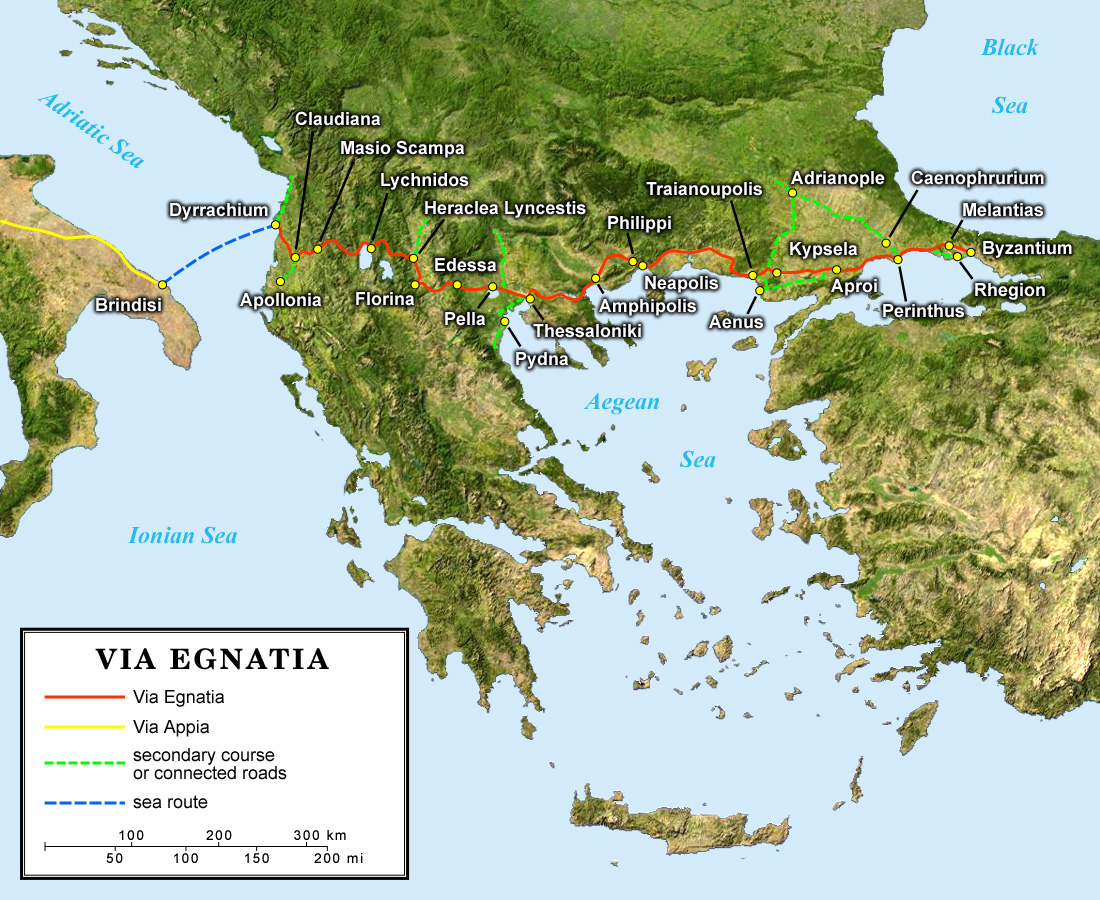
Apollonia was strategically located at the beginning of one of the two starting branches of the Via Egnatia in Illyria. Retracing a prehistoric trade route that linked the eastern Adriatic coast with eastern Thrace, the road permitted overland travel elsewhere in the region, and it was the principal land route from Rome to the east.

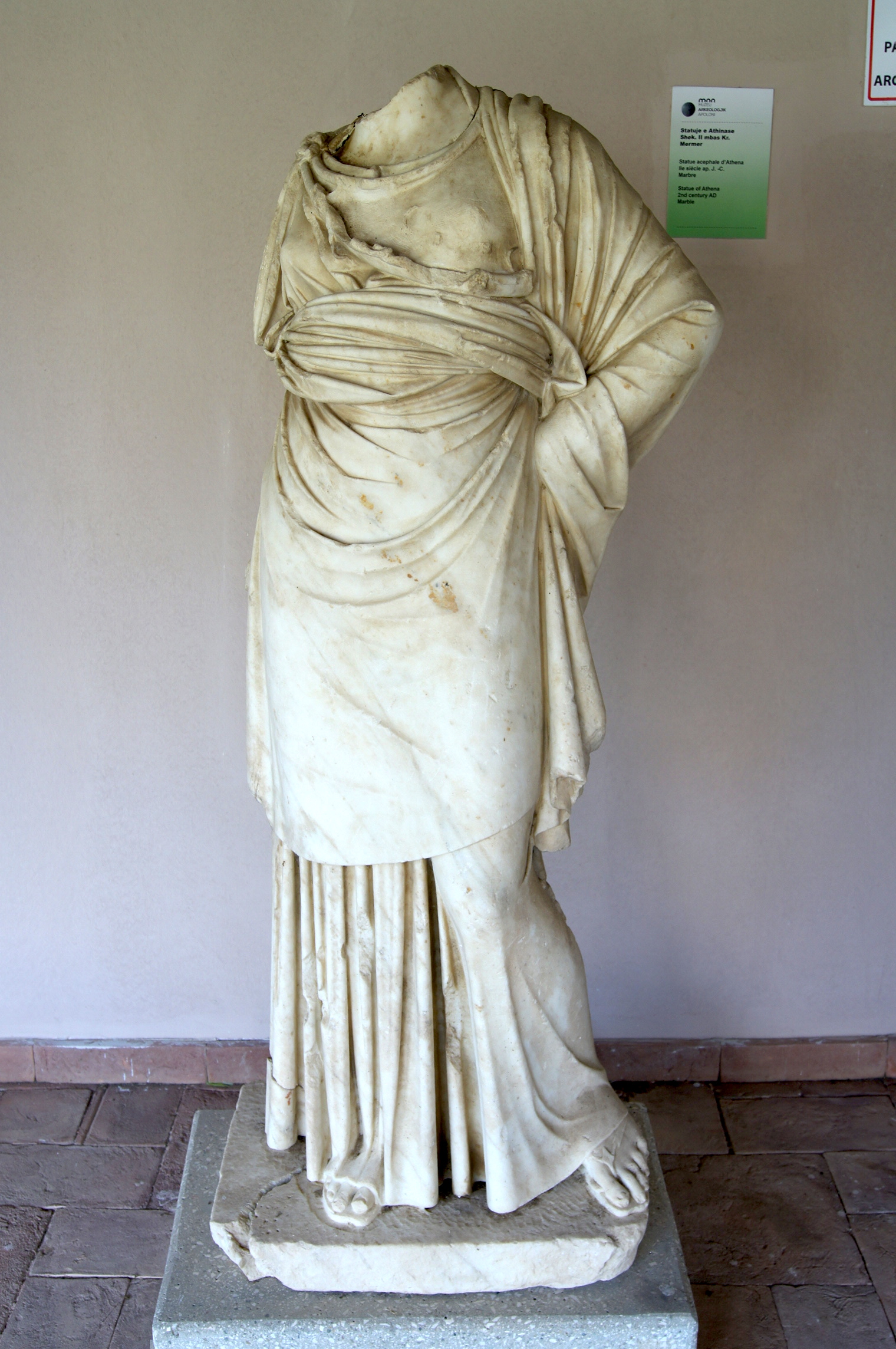
Athena of the Vescovali-Arezzo type from the 2nd century AD

In 229 BC, it came under the control of the Roman Republic, to which it was firmly loyal. In the Fourth Macedonian War, the praetor Lucius Anicius Gallus who led the Roman campaign to defeat the Illyrian ruler Gentius, was based in Apollonia with Roman troops and 2,000 infantry and 200 cavalry from the Illyrian tribe of the Parthini led by tribal leaders Epicadus and Algalsus, as a part of the captured fleet of Gentius was presented to the people of Apollonia after the war. It is possible that by the 3rd century BC, Apollonia's colonial character changed or was lost as a high proportion of Illyrians in highly ranked positions began to emerge. Another possible reason of admixture was Apollonia's growth and territorial expansion, with the incorporation of additional Greek colonists at a later era, though they probably did not enjoy full citizenship privileges. In 148 BC, Apollonia became part of the Roman province of Macedonia, specifically of Epirus Nova. It supported Julius Caesar in his civil war against Pompey, but fell to Pompey's ally Marcus Junius Brutus in 48 BC. Gaius Octavius later known as Augustus studied in Apollonia in 44 BC under the tutelage of Athenodorus of Tarsus; it was there that he received news of Caesar's murder. The city received a series of privileges by Gaius Octavius which reaffirmed its oligarchic institutions, which were seen favorably by the emerging power structure in Rome.

Apollonia flourished under Roman rule and was noted by Cicero in his Philippicae as magna urbs et gravis, a great and important city. Christianity was established in the city at an early stage, and bishops from Apollonia were present during the First Council of Ephesus (431) and the Council of Chalcedon (451). It was mentioned in the 6th century Synecdemus of Hyerocles among the 20 cities of the Illyrian provinces, as part of Epirus Nova. Its decline, however, began in the 3rd century AD, when an earthquake changed the path of the Aoös, causing the harbour to silt up and the inland area to become a malaria-ridden swamp. The city became increasingly uninhabitable as the inland swamp expanded, and the nearby settlement of Avlona (modern-day Vlorë) became dominant.

=== Legacy ===
Apollonia has not been inhabited after its 4th century AD abandonment, with the exception of a monastery. As such, by the end of antiquity, the city was largely depopulated, hosting only a small Christian community. This community (which probably is part of the site of the old city) built the church of the Dormition of the Theotokos (Albanian: Shën Mëri) on a nearby hill, part of the Ardenica Monastery. At the monastery a Greek language school was operating at 1684 which provided also 'higher education' that time. A school still existed in 1880 but with a limited number of students.

In June 2020, part of the site was vandalized by unknown individuals. Two columns were knocked down, but were subsequently re-erected. According to the site's director, the damage might be "irreparable" and likely occurred during the COVID-19 lockdown. The incident was condemned by Albanian archeologists and the President of Albania, Ilir Meta.

== Archaeology ==
Official Logo

The city seems to have sunk with the rise of Vlora. It was "rediscovered" by European classicists in the 18th century, though it was not until the Austrian occupation of 1916–1918 that the site was investigated by archaeologists. Their work was continued by a French team between 1924 and 1938. Parts of the site were damaged during the Second World War. After the war, an Albanian team undertook further work from 1948 onwards, although much of the site remains unexcavated to this day.

In 1967, the archaeological site was seriously and irrevocably damaged by heavy machinery and the building of c. 400 concrete military bunkers at and near the ancient polis. Some of the team's archeological discoveries are on display within the monastery, known as the Archaeological Museum of Apolonia (opened in 1958) and other artifacts from Apollonia are in the capital Tirana. Unfortunately, during the anarchy that followed the collapse of the communist party in 1990 and reversion to capitalism, the archeological collection was plundered and the museum was temporarily closed. The ruins were also frequently dug up by plunderers for relics to be sold to collectors abroad. In December 2011, a new museum opened, under the directorship of Marin Haxhimihali. It replaced an older museum dating from 1985, and was funded by UNESCO's MDG-F Joint Programme "Culture and Heritage for Social and Economic Development".

In 2006, archaeologists discovered a Greek temple which dates back to the 6th century BC just outside of the Apollonia.

In August 2010, a French-Albanian team of archaeologists unearthed a bust of a Roman soldier, 50 years after the discoveries of other full body statues in the 1958–1960 period expeditions, led by Albanian scholar Selim Islami and Russian Professor Blavatski.

A German-Albanian team has been working on the Hellenistic theatre at Albania, throwing light on the development of Greek theatres and also local variants

== Episcopal history ==
A bishopric was founded there circa 400 AD but suppressed around 599. One of the participants in the Council of Ephesus in 431 was a Felix who signed once as Bishop of Apollonia and Byllis, at another time as Bishop of Apollonia. Some assume that the two towns formed a single episcopal see, others suppose he was, strictly speaking, Bishop only of Apollonia, but was temporarily in charge also of Byllis during a vacancy of that see (apostolic administrator). One of the participants at a council held in Constantinople in 448 signed as Paulus Episcopus Apolloniada al. Apolloniatarum, civitatis sanctae ecclesiae, but it is uncertain whether he was associated with this Apollonia. At the Council of Chalcedon in 451, Eusebius subscribed simply as Bishop of Apollonia. In the letter of the bishops of Epirus Nova to the Byzantine Emperor Leo I in 458, Philocharis subscribes as Bishop of what the manuscripts call "Vallidus", and which editors think should be corrected to "Byllis". Whether Philocharis is to be considered Bishop also of Apollonia depends on the interpretation of the position of Felix in 431.

The Annuario Pontificio lists Apollonia as a titular see, thus recognizing that it was once a residential diocese, a suffragan of the archbishopric of Dyrrachium, It grants no such recognition to Byllis. Metropolitan of the Roman province of Epirus Novus.

== Culture ==
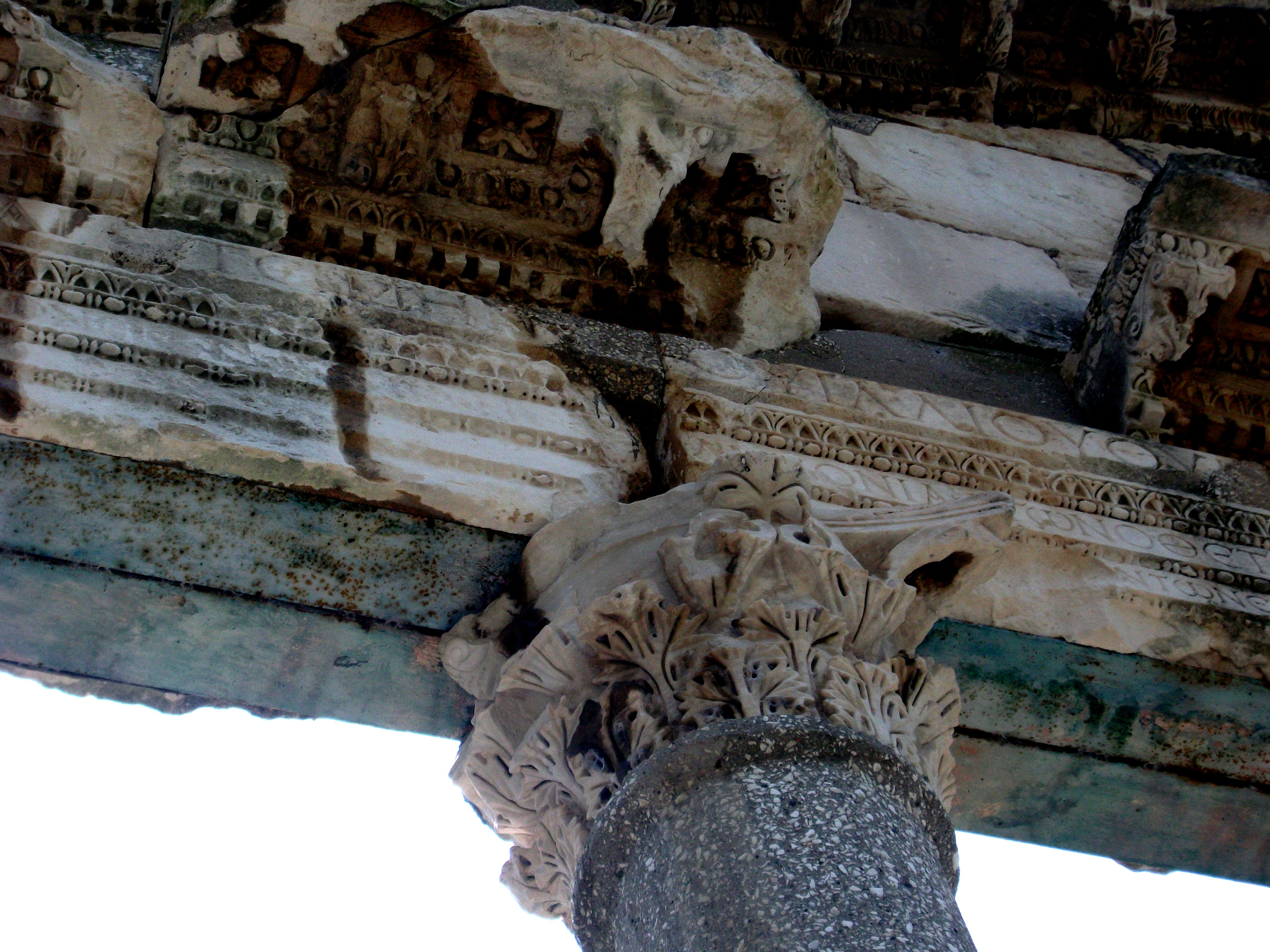
Capital of Monument of Agonothetes

Around 450 BC, Apollonia expanded towards Thronion which it defeated and gained control of its territory. The victory was commemorated by a monument erected in Olympia. It was described by Pausanias who visited it many centuries later. The monument was an arrangement of five Trojan and five Achaean heroes who faced each other and were observed by Zeus who stood at the center, surrounded by Eos and Thetis, while Apollo and other gods who supported the Trojans were placed to his right. The monument highlights that Apollonia had embraced a tradition which showed preference for the Trojans in Trojan War. This tradition had developed in Epirus and southern Illyria in reference to mythological constructions which linked the foundation of settlements to Trojan migration in the area. From 2nd century B.C Apollonia became a major center of Greek leaning. Apollonia was also a major centre for the study of astronomy. The building known as the Agonothetes monument was built in the 2nd century BC. It had a ten-tier cavea and functioned as Apollonia's municipal building for council meetings. Its small capacity highlights that the oligarchic political organization of Apollonia was preserved in its early Roman era.

== Notable people ==
- Isocrates of Apollonia, rhetorician and pupil of the elder Isocrates

== Gallery ==
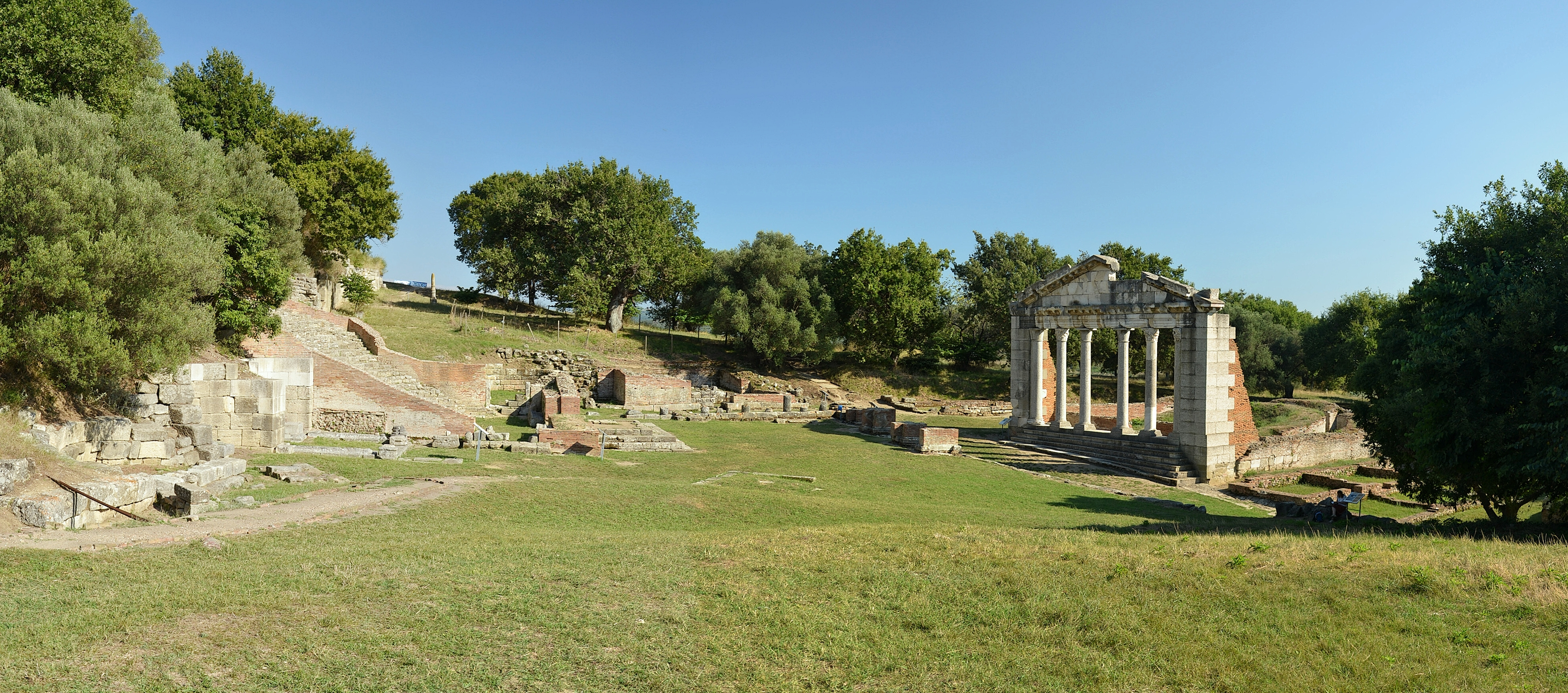
Ruins

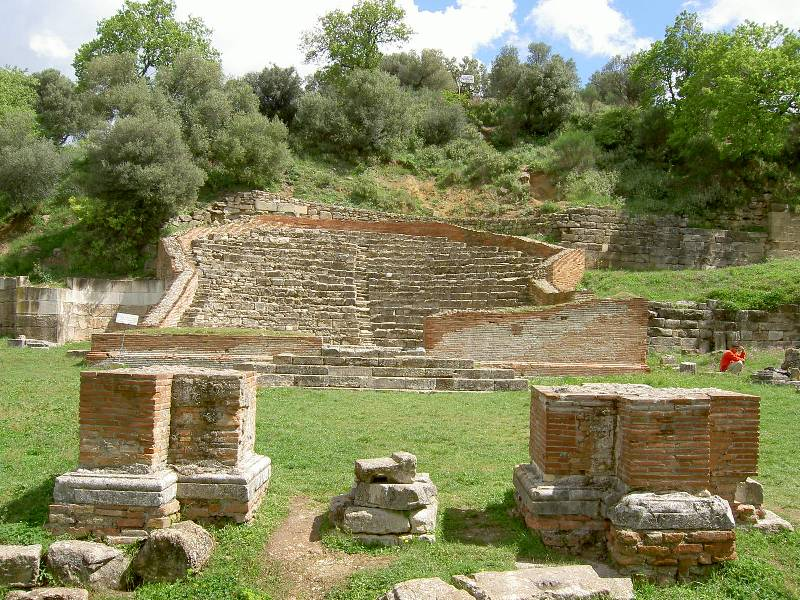
Odeon

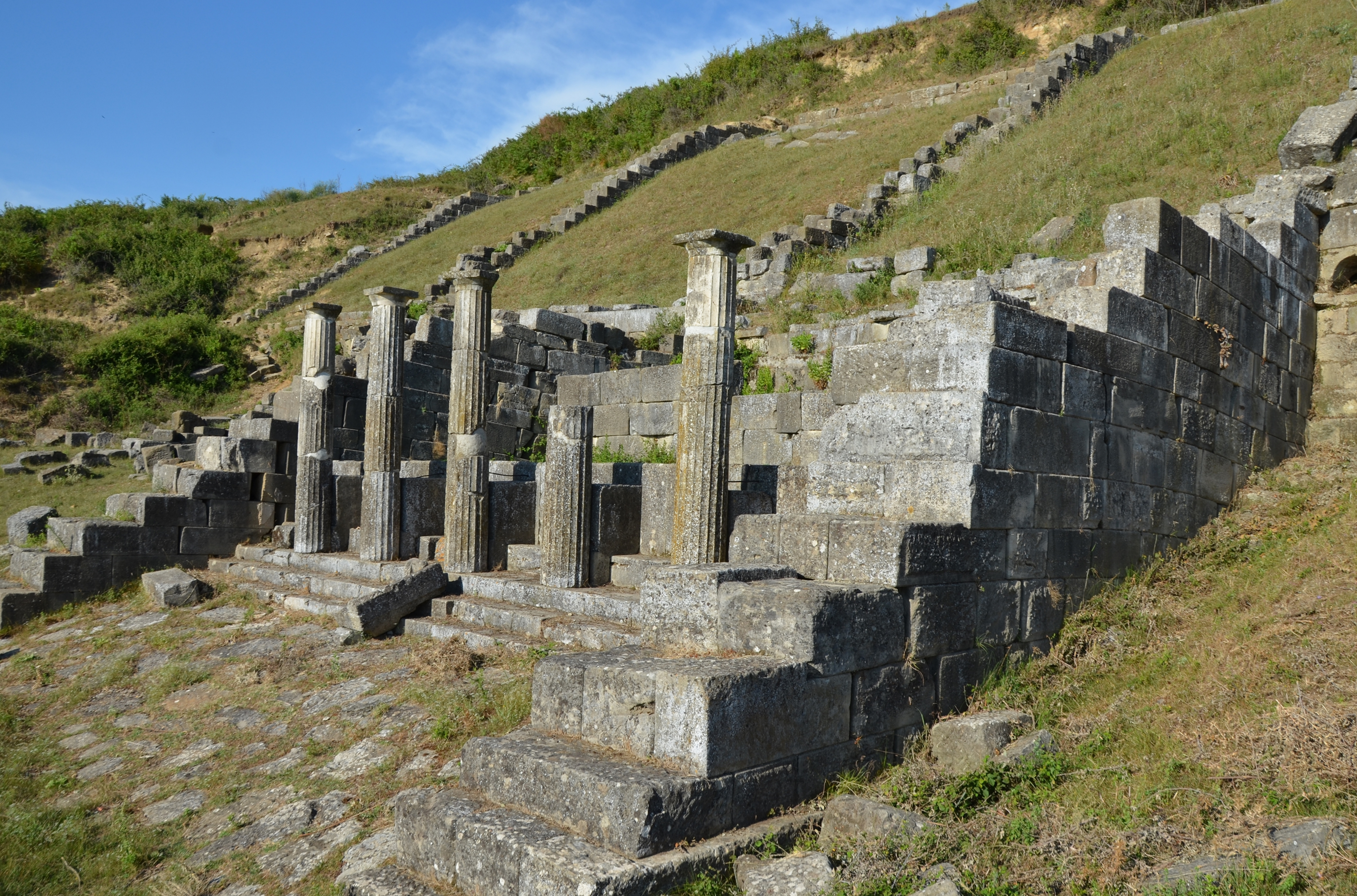
Nymphaeum

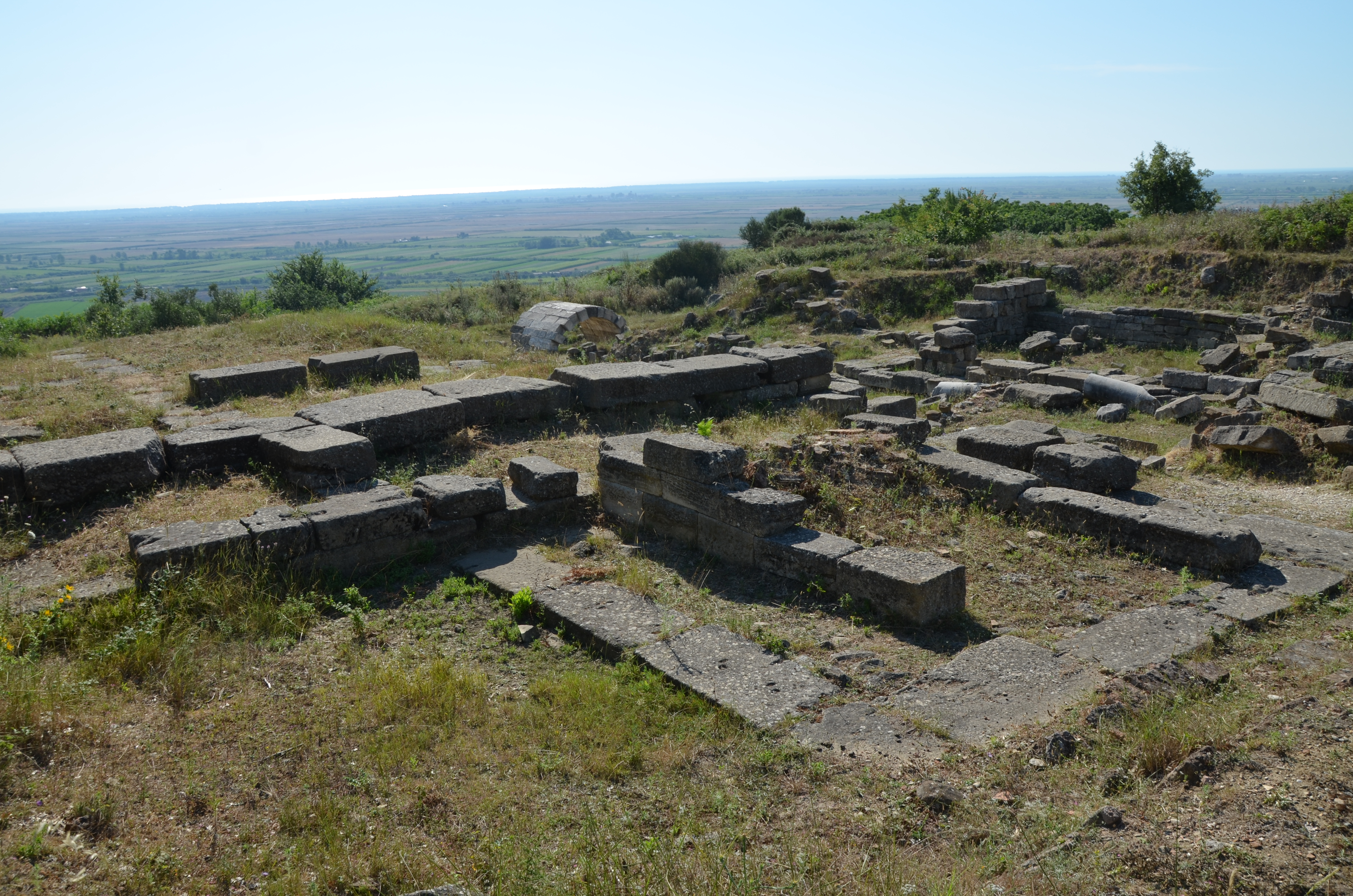
Ruins of a temple

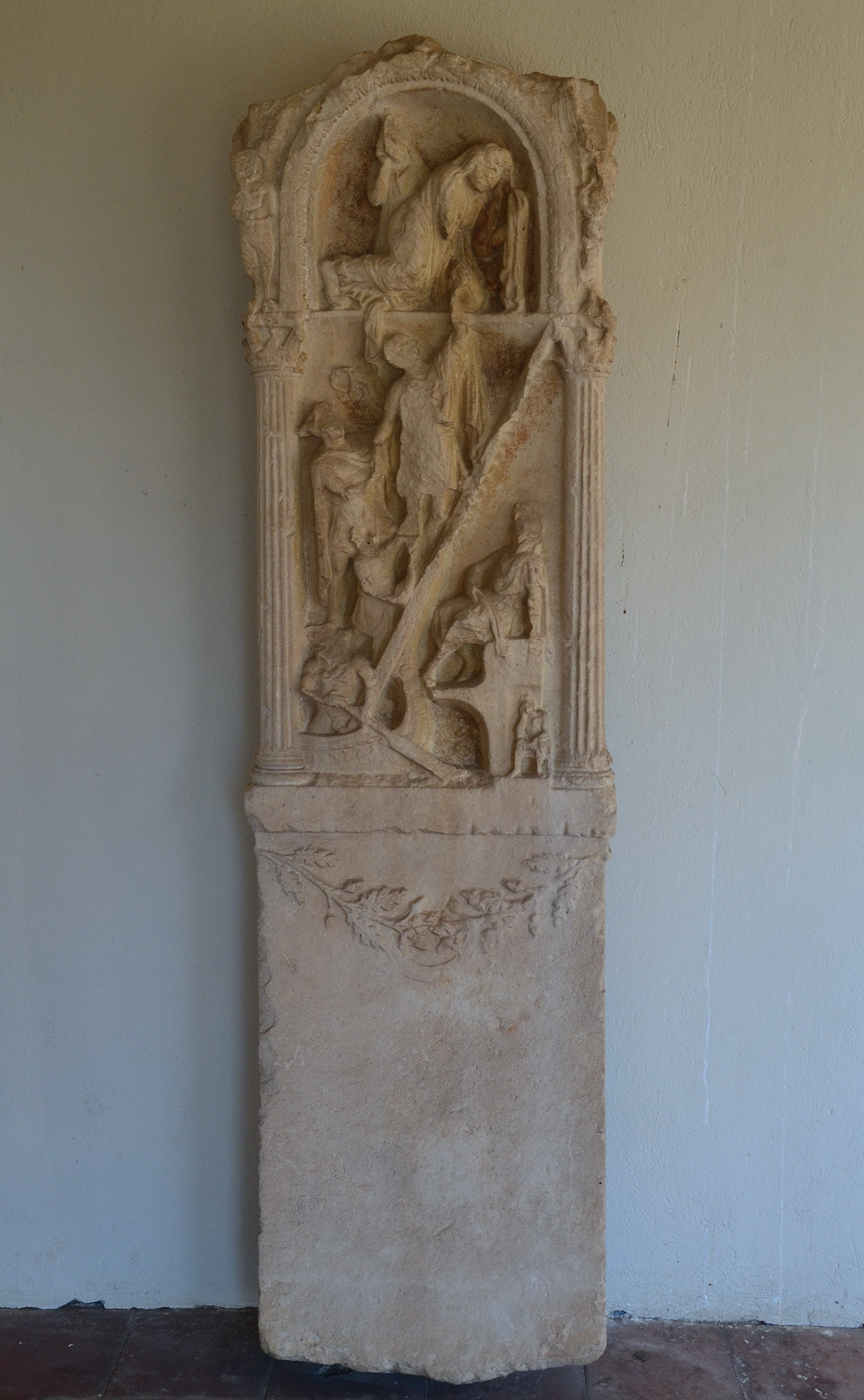
Stele of Hermes accompanied by Hades, 3rd century BCE

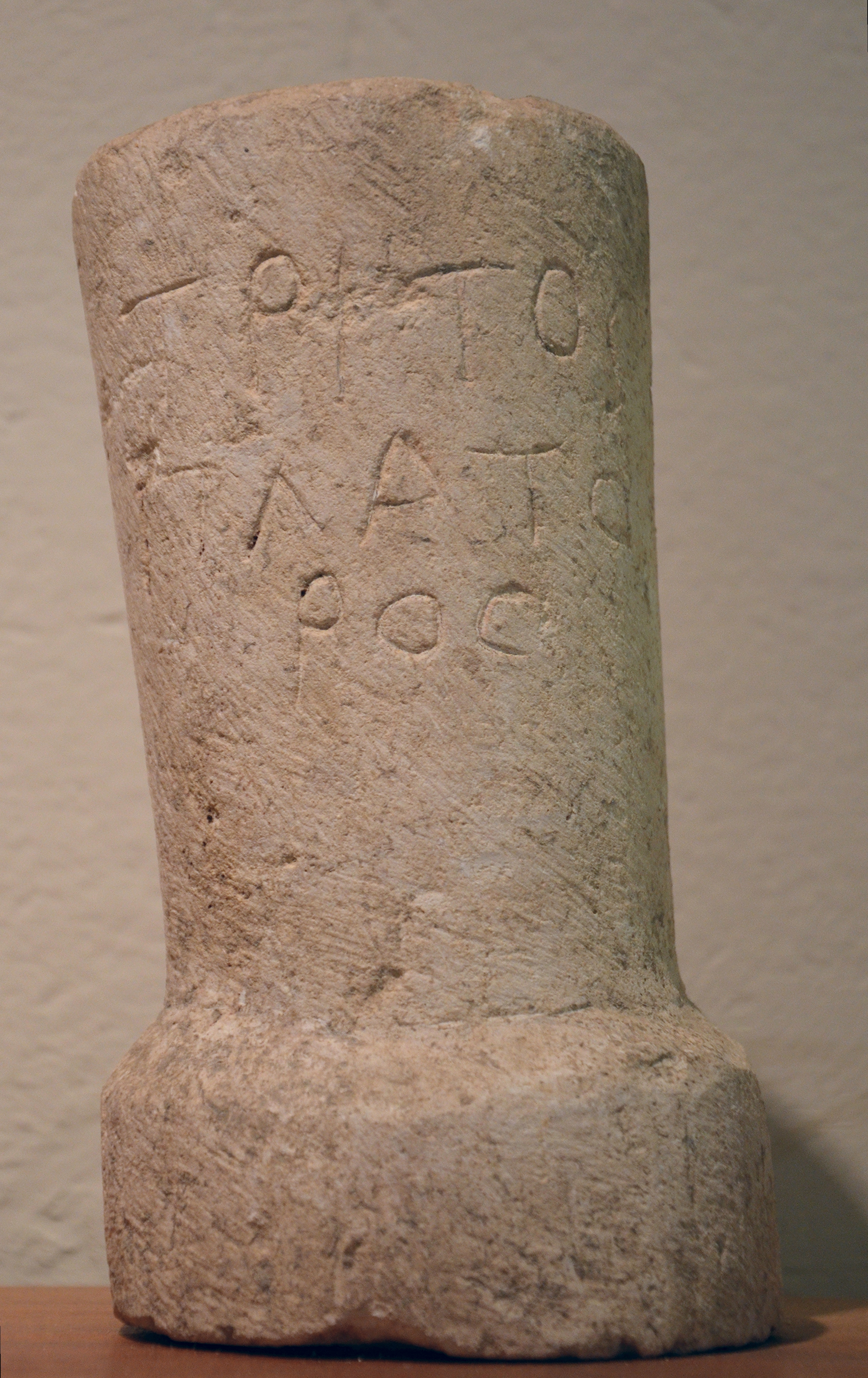
Tombstone with the Illyrian name Tritos, Platoros (Tritos, son of Plator), 2nd century BCE

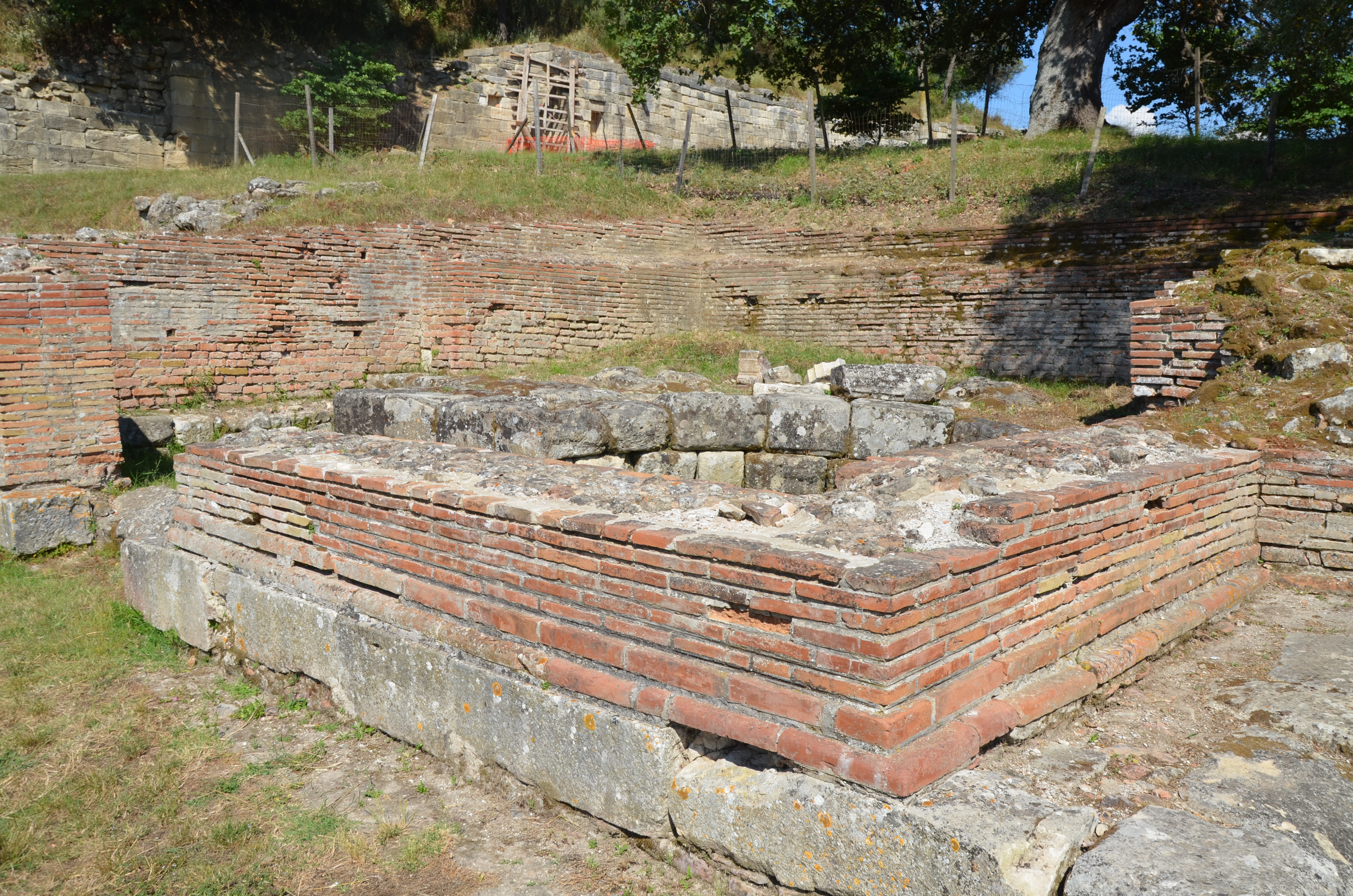
Roman library

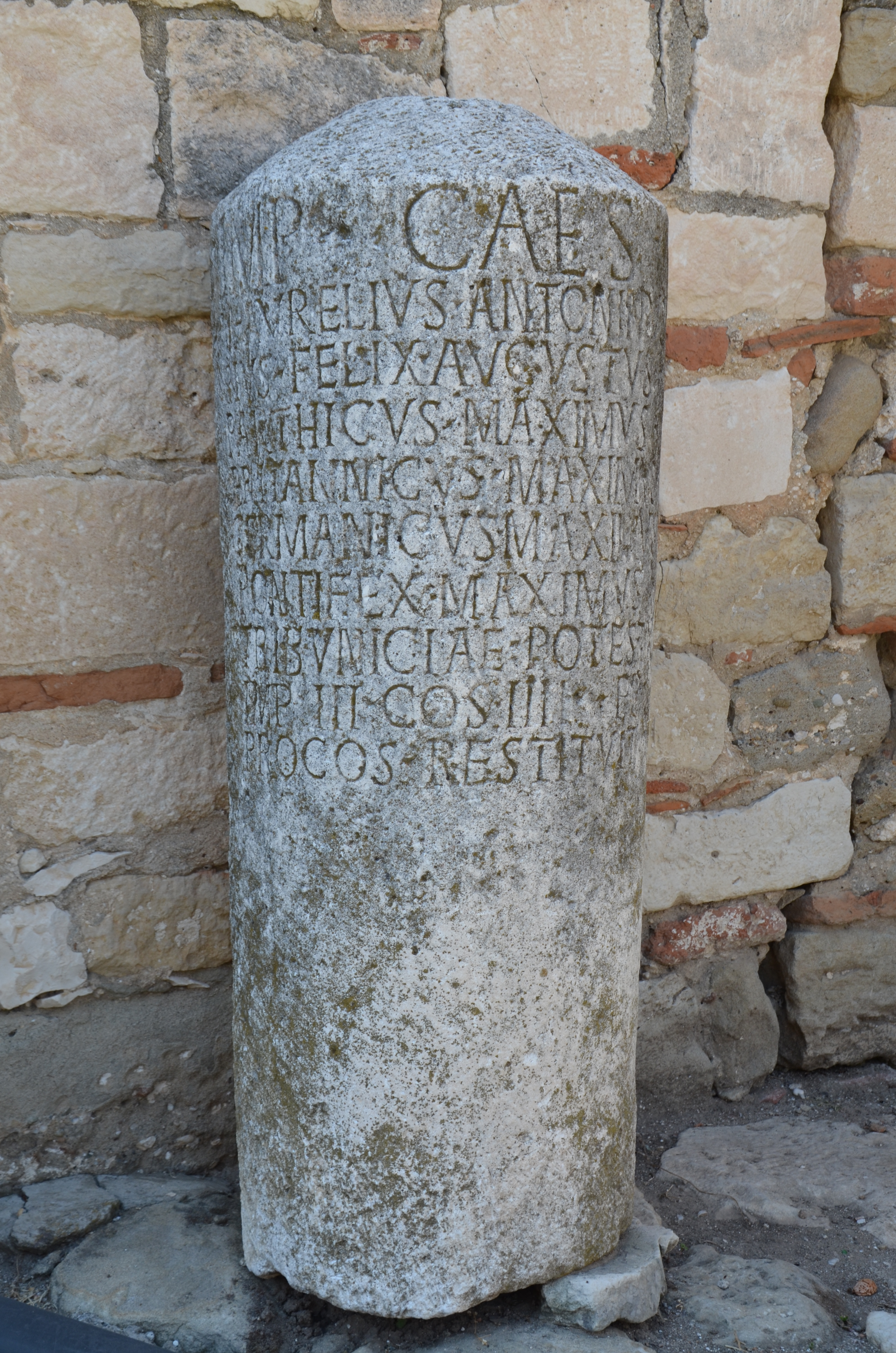
Dedication to Marcus Aurelius, 2nd century CE

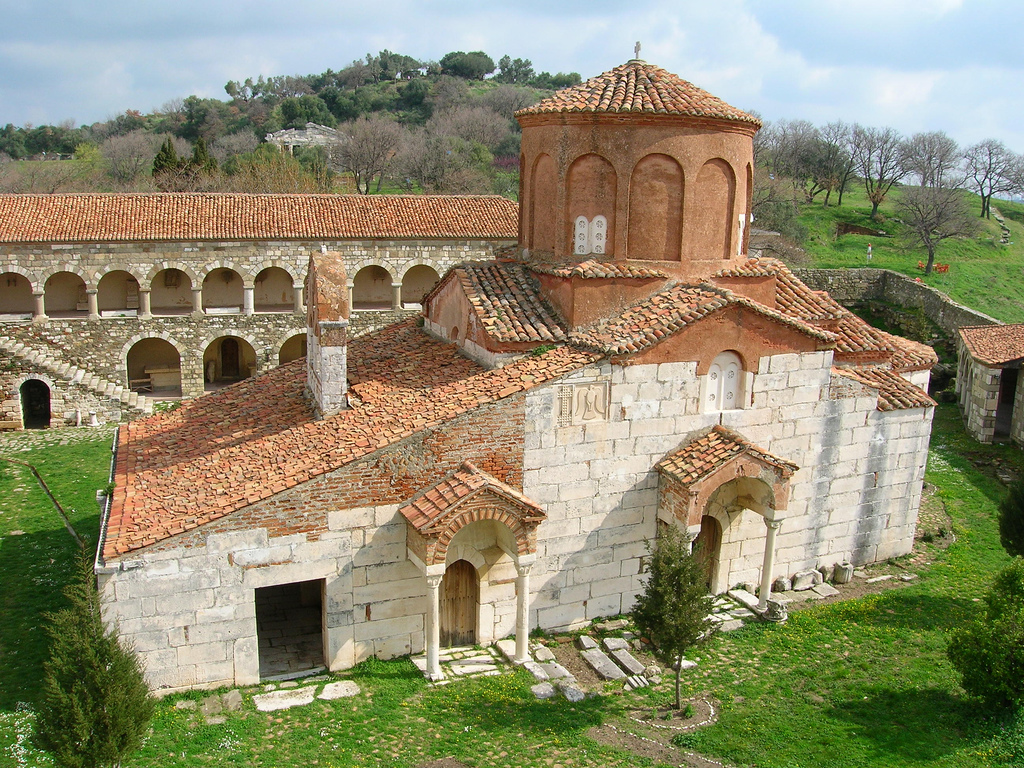
Saint Mary Church

== See also ==
- List of settlements in Illyria
- Tourism in Albania
