= Oeoclus =

Son of Poseidon and the naiad Ascra

In Greek mythology, Oeoclus (Ancient Greek: Οἴοκλος, romanized: Oíoklos, lit. 'lone-famed' or 'famous alone') was the son of Poseidon and the naiad Ascra. Together with the giants Aloadae (children of Poseidon and Iphimedeia), Oeoclus founded the town of Ascra, Boeotia which he named in honour of his mother.
