= Phorbas (son of Triopas) =

Son of Triopas in Greek mythology

In Greek mythology, Phorbas (Ancient Greek: Φόρβας, gen. Φόρβαντος) or Phorbaceus was a Thessalian prince and hero of the island of Rhodes. He was sometimes confounded with the Phlegyan Phorbas.

== Family ==
Phorbas was the son of Triopas and Hiscilla, daughter of Myrmidon, and thus brother to Erysichthon and Iphimedia, mother of the Aloads. He was probably the Phorbas who was identified as the father of Pelles, founder of Achaean Pellene, who fathered Hyperasius, father of the Argonauts Amphion and Asterius.

According to a fragment of the lost genealogical epic Catalogue of Women, Phorbas was the father of the monster Scylla, who famously appears in Homer's Odyssey, by the goddess Hecate. Since it is unclear where in the epic the fragment occurred, this may also be another Phorbas than the Thessalian one. There is also the similarity between the name of Phorbas' mother Hiscilla and Scylla, and the names Phorbas and Phorcys, who is Scylla's father in other ancient texts. It is therefore not certain whether this was a textual corruption or whether the epic really claimed this.

== Mythology ==
When the people of the island of Rhodes fell victim to a plague of masses of serpents (may have been dragons or simply snakes), an oracle directed them to call on a man named Phorbas. Phorbas cleansed the island of the snakes and in gratitude the Rhodians venerated him as a hero. For his achievement he won a place among the stars as the constellation Serpentarius or Ophiuchus.

According to an early account, before his departure, Phorbas was a rival in love of the god Apollo. In a later account he was portrayed as Apollo's lover, consequently dying.
