= Ascra (mythology) =

Woman in Greek mythology

In Greek mythology, Ascra or Askre (Ancient Greek: Ἄσκρα or Ἄσκρη, romanized: Áskra, Áskrē or Askrê) was a naiad nymph associated with the main spring or well of the Boeotian town of Ascra, at the foot of Mount Helicon. She was the mother by Poseidon of Oeoclus who, along with the Aloadae, founded the town named Ascra after his mother. From this place Zeus received the surname Ascraus.
