= Iphimede =

In Greek mythology, the name Iphimede (Ancient Greek: Ἰφιμέδη, Iphimédē) may refer to:

- Iphigeneia, called "Iphimede" in the Catalogue of Women
- Iphimedeia, called "Iphimede" by Parthenius of Nicaea
