= Iphimedeia =

Person in Greek mythology

Iphimedia
- Princess of Thessaly
- Member of the Thessalian Royal Family
- Other names: Iphimede, Iphimedea, Iphimedia
- Abode: Thessaly

Genealogy
- Parents: Triopas and Hiscilla
- Siblings: Erysichthon and Phorbas
- Consort: (1) Poseidon (2) Aloeus
- Children: (1) Aloadae (Otus and Ephialtes) (2) Aloadae and Pancratis (Pancrato)

In Greek mythology, Iphimedeia (/ˌɪfɪmɪˈdaɪə/; Ancient Greek: Ἰφιμέδεια) or Iphimede (Ἰφιμέδη) was a Thessalian princess. She was attested in Homer's Odyssey in the Catalogue of Women as being a mortal.

== Family ==
Iphimedia was the daughter of Triopas of Thessaly (a son of Poseidon and Canace) and probably by Hiscilla, daughter of King Myrmidon of Phthia. Her possible brothers were Erysichthon and Phorbas.

Iphimedea had by Poseidon the twins Otus and Ephialtes who were called the Aloadae after their stepfather. One account called these men's natural father as Aloeus, husband and paternal uncle of Iphimede. The latter mothered as well Pancratis (or Pancrato) to Aloeus. She was probably also the mother of Elate and Platanus, the sisters of the Aloadae.

== Mythology ==
=== Early years ===
Iphimedeia also fell in love with Poseidon, god of the sea, and would often come to the sea shore where she poured the sea water in her lap, until the god came and answered her feelings (cf. the story of Tyro).

=== Thracian abduction ===
Iphimedia's daughter Pancratis was renowned for her beauty. When the two participated in the celebration of the orgies of Dionysus near Drius in Achaea Phthiotis, they were carried off by the companions of the Thracian king Butes and brought to the island of Strongyle (later Naxos) where Pancratis was given in marriage to the new king Agassamenus and Iphimedia to a friend and lieutenant of his. Two other leaders, Sicelus and Hecetorus, had fought over Pancratis and killed each other (or else they were Scellis and Agassamenus themselves). Soon after, Otus and Ephialtes, sent by Aloeus, defeated the Thracians and rescued their mother and sister but Pancratis died not much later.

=== Connection with Hekate ===
Iphimedeia was one of the heroines whose spirits Odysseus encountered at the entrance of the Underworld.

According to Pietro Scarpi, Iphimedeia should be placed in the chthonic realm as a double of Hekate.

== Ancient cults ==
Her name seems to be attested in Mycenaean Greek in the Linear B syllabic script at Pylos in the form 𐀂𐀟𐀕𐀆𐀊, i-pe-me-de-ja.

Pausanias mentions a painting of Iphimedeia by Polygnotus, and remarks that she was honored by the Carians in Mylasa.

The tomb of Iphimedeia and her sons was shown at Anthedon in Boetia.
