= Triopas =

Set of mythological Greek characters

In Greek mythology, Triopas (/ˈtraɪəpəs/) or Triops (/ˈtraɪ.əps, ˈtraɪˌɒps/; Ancient Greek: Τρίωψ, gen.: Τρίοπος) was the name of several characters whose relations are unclear.

- Triopas, king of Argos and son of Phorbas. His daughter was Messene.
- Triopas, king of Thessaly, and son of Poseidon and princess Canace, daughter of King Aeolus of Aeolia. He was the brother of Aloeus, Epopeus, Hopleus and Nireus. Triopas was the husband of Myrmidon's daughter Hiscilla, by whom he became the father of Iphimedeia, Phorbas and Erysichthon. He destroyed a temple of Demeter in order to obtain materials for roofing his own house, and was punished by insatiable hunger as well as being plagued by a snake which inflicted illness on him. Eventually Demeter placed him and the snake among the stars as the constellation Ophiuchus to remind others of his crime and punishment. A city in Caria was named Triopion after him.
- Triopas, one of the Heliadae, sons of Helios and Rhodos and grandson of Poseidon. Triopas, along with his brothers, Macar, Actis and Candalus, were jealous of a fifth brother, Tenages's, skill at science, and killed him. When their crime was discovered, Triopas escaped to Caria and seized a promontory which received his name (the Triopian Promontory). Later, he founded the city of Knidos. There was a statue of him and his horse at Delphi, an offering by the people of Knidos.

The name's popular etymology is "he who has three eyes" (from τρι- "three" + -ωπ- "see") but the ending -ωψ, -οπος suggests a Pre-Greek origin.
