= Hecetorus =

In Greek mythology, Hecetor or Hecetorus (Ancient Greek: Ἑκήτωρ, gen.: Ἑκήτορος, romanized: Hekētoros) was a Thracian figure mentioned in the abduction tale of Pancratis, daughter of Aloeus.

== Mythology ==
According to Diodorus, Hecetorus and the other Thracian chief Sicelus were both captivated by the beauty of Pancratis. When these Thracian pirates abducted the maiden from Achaean Phthiotis and brought her to Strongyle (later called Naxos), Hecetorus and Sicelus quarrelled over Pancratis and eventually killed each other.

Meanwhile, as recounted by Parthenius citing from the second book of the Naxiaca of Andriscus, Hecetor was the father of Scilles and Agassamenus. His sons fell in love with Pancrato and both met their own deaths at the hands of each other.
