= Mardylas =

Greek mythological shepherd

In Greek mythology, Mardylas (Ancient Greek: Μαρδύλας, romanized: Mardúlas) is a young shepherd from the region of Epirus in northwestern Greece. According to the story, Mardylas stole a flock of animals from his neighbour and attempted to cut down the sacred tree of Zeus in an aetiological myth about the establishment of the oracle of Dodona. Mardylas' story is an obscure one which only survives in ancient scholia.

== Mythology ==
Mardylas was a shepherd grazing his flock in Dodona, an ancient Greek kingdom in Epirus. He desired the best herd of a fellow shepherd and stole it. The herd's owner searched for his lost flock among the other shepherds, but had no luck finding his livestock. Finally, he asked from Zeus (the god venerated at the oracle of Dodona) to reveal the thief to him, and it was then that an oak tree (the sacred tree of Zeus) spoke with a human voice and designated the youngest of the shepherds. The owner realised this meant Mardylas, the most recent of the men who grazed in the area. (Note: The Greek text is ambiguous and can translate to both "the youngest" and "the most recent".) Mardylas got angry at the tale-telling tree and went at night to cut it down in revenge. As he was about to strike, a dove emerged from the tree trunk and ordered them not to proceed with his intentions. Mardylas, frightened, let the oak tree be. Nonetheless the other Dodonians were livid at him for his sacrilegious behaviour, so they fined him and established an oracle.

== Analysis ==
The ancient scholiast attributed this story to Proxenus, a historian in the court of King Pyrrhus of Epirus, who wrote down his version of the foundation of the Dodonian oracle in his lost Epirotica. The legend was likely an Epirotic tale meant to explain the oracle from a native source. It combines elements of typical folk-tales and the more sophisticated story-telling, seen in the action of asking a tree to identify a thief, perhaps inherited from the times when the god and the sacred tree were indistinguishable in a peasant's mind.

Proxenus might have also wanted to flatter Pyrrhus by highlighting the economic and cultural activity of Epirus, but perhaps also make a connection with Thessaly; the name Mardylas is a hapax legomenon (it does not occur anywhere else in surviving corpus) but is likely related to Mardylis, a name attested in a Thessalian inscription. Proxenus could also have intentionally modified the also Epirotic myth of the woodcutter Hellus, from whom the Dodonian priests Selloi descended. Unlike Mardylas, Hellus did not know the tree was prophetic, so he was not guilty of impiety.

François Quantin regarded the fable as a dramatization of the return of the shepherds and the flocks from the summer pastures and the role of the last flock to travel back, responsible for retrieving any stray sheep along the way.

== See also ==
Similar motifs in Greek mythology:

- Autolycus, a cattle-thief
- Evenius, an Epirote punished by his community
- Erysichthon, a man who cut down a sacred grove

== Bibliography ==
- Ambühl, Annemarie (October 1, 2006). "Selli". In Cancik, Hubert; Schneider, Helmuth (eds.). Brill's New Pauly. Translated by Christine F. Salazar. Groningen: Brill Reference Online. ISSN 1574-9347.
- Anonymous, D Scholia to the Odyssey (Mythological Narratives (historiai), translated into English by Camden Roy and R. Scott Smith as Mythical Stories in the D Scholia to Homer's Iliad. Available online at Topos Text.
- Hughes, Thomas S. (1820). Travels in Sicily, Greece and Albania. London, UK: J. Mawman.
- Parke, Herbert W. (1967). The Oracles of Zeus: Dodona, Olympia, Ammon. Harvard University Press.
- Philostratus the Elder, Imagines, translated by A. Fairbanks, Loeb Classical Library No, 256. Harvard University Press, Cambridge, Massachusetts. 1931. ISBN 978-0674992825. Topos Text.
- Piccinini, Jessica (December 2017). The Shrine of Dodona in the Archaic and Classical Ages: A History. Edizioni Università di Macerata. ISBN 978-88-6056-547-1.
- Quantin, François (1999). "Aspects Épirotes de la Religieuse Antique". Revue Des Études Grecques (in French). 112 (1).
