= Dioplethes =

Phthian prince as son of King Myrmidon and possibly Peisidice (daughter of Aeolus)

In Greek mythology, Dioplethes was a Phthian prince as son of King Myrmidon and possibly Peisidice (daughter of Aeolus), thus brother to Antiphus, Actor, Erysichthon, Eupolemeia and Hiscilla. In some accounts, he was the father of Perieres, King of Messenia.
