= Elate (mythology) =

Greek mythological figure

In Greek mythology, Elate (Ancient Greek: Ἐλάτη, romanized: Elátē, lit. 'fir') is a minor female figure, the sister of the two Aloadae giants who was transformed into a fir tree.

== Family ==
As sister to the Aloadae, Elate was probably the daughter of Iphimedeia by either Aloeus or Poseidon, the god of the sea.

== Mythology ==
Elate was big in size, as big as her enormous brothers. When they died after trying to wage war against the heavens, she mourned them so much she was changed into a fir tree. She kept however her great size in her new life, hence the ancient Greek expression "a silver-fir tree big as heaven." Her sister, Platanus, had a similar fate.

== See also ==
- Heliades
- Pelia
- Niobe

== Bibliography ==
- Bell, Robert E. (1991). Women of Classical Mythology: A Biographical Dictionary. California, United States: ABC-Clio. ISBN 9780874365818.
- Fontenrose, Joseph Eddy (1981). Orion: The Myth of the Hunter and the Huntress. University of California Press. ISBN 0-520-09632-0.
- Libanius (2008). Libanius's Progymnasmata: Model Exercises in Greek Prose Composition and Rhetoric. Translated by Craig A. Gibson. Atlanta: Society of Biblical Literature. ISBN 978-1-58983-360-9.
