= Amphrysus =

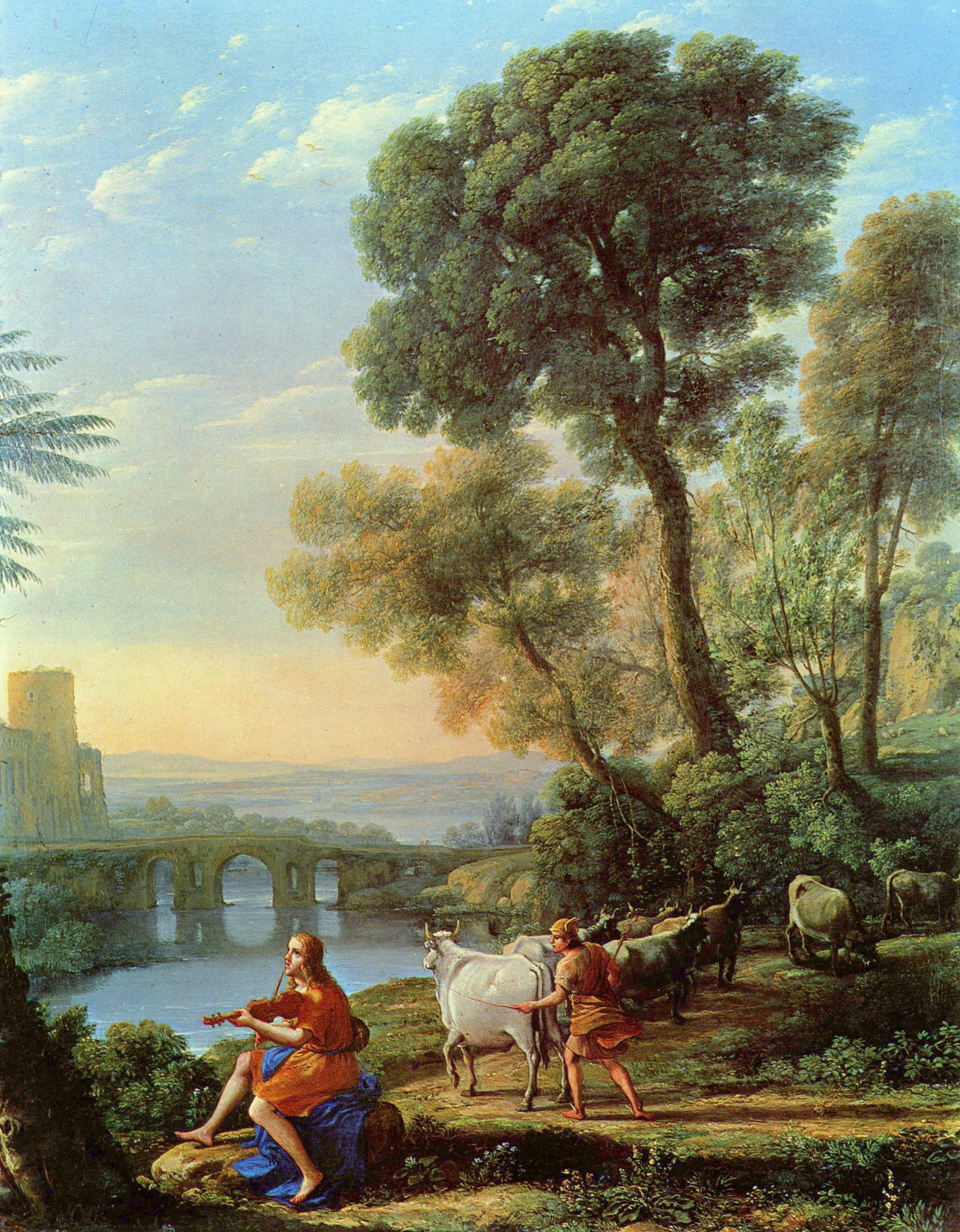

- Location of mouth

Location
- Country: Ancient Greece
- Province: Thessaly

Physical characteristics
- Source
  - location: Mount Othrys
  - coordinates: 39°1′1″N 22°42′35″E
- Mouth
  - location: Pagasetic Gulf
  - coordinates: 39°15′N 23°00′E

The Amphrysus (Ancient Greek: Ἄμφρυσος - Amphrysos or Ἄμφρυσσος - Amphryssos) was a river in ancient Thessaly, flowing from Mount Othrys to the Pagasetic Gulf. According to Strabo, it flowed close to the walls of the town Halos.

In Callimachus' "Hymn to Apollo" (48) Apollo tends Admetus' herds by the Amphryssos during his punishment for killing the Cyclopes. In the Argonautica (I.53) of Apollonius of Rhodes Eupolemeia bore the Argonaut Aethalides to Hermes near the Amphryssos.

In Virgil's Aeneid, 6.398, Virgil refers to the Sibyl (the aged prophetess who accompanies Aeneas to the Underworld) as Amphrysia vates ("Amphrysian seer"), to indicate that she is a priestess of the god Apollo. R. D. Williams comments: "Servius is justified in his comment longe petitum epitheton ["a far-fetched epithet"]."
