= Butes =

Set of mythological Greek characters

In Greek mythology, the name Butes (/ˈbjuːtiːz/; Ancient Greek: Βούτης, romanized: Boútēs, lit. 'herdsman') referred to several different people.

- Butes, an Athenian prince as the son of King Pandion I and the naiad Zeuxippe. He was a priest of Poseidon and Athena and was worshipped as a hero by the Athenians. He was married to Chthonia, daughter of his brother Erechtheus. Butes other siblings were Philomela, Procne and possibly Teuthras.
- Butes, or Butas, an Argonaut, son of Teleon and Zeuxippe (daughter of Eridanus). In some accounts, his father was called Aeneus or even Poseidon. When the Argonauts were sailing past the Sirens, he was the only one who was unable to resist the charm of their singing, swimming off to them. But Aphrodite saved Butes by transferring him to Lilybaeum in Sicily, where he became her lover. Other accounts call him a famous bee keeper and a native Sicilian king. He was the father of Eryx by Aphrodite, and also of Polycaon.
- Butes, a Thracian, Boreas's son, who was hostile towards his stepbrother Lycurgus and was driven out of the country by him. He settled in the island of Strongyle (Naxos) with a bunch of men, and proceeded to attack those who sailed past the island. As there were no women on Strongyle to begin with, they would sail here and there to seize some from the land, but were not quite successful. When they landed in Thessaly for that purpose, Butes offended Dionysus by raping Coronis, a Maenad, and was made insane upon her imploration, in which state he threw himself down a well and died. His companions did abduct some women, including Iphimedeia and her daughter Pancratis.
- Butes, possible father of Hippodamia (wife of Pirithous). She is otherwise referred to as daughter of Atrax or Adrastus.
- Butes, son of Pallas and brother of Clytus; the two brothers were younger companions of Cephalus.
- Butes, a member of the clan of Amycus, from Bithynia, who, despite being a champion wrestler, was killed by Dares in a boxing match.
- Butes, a warrior in the army of the Seven against Thebes killed by Haemon.
- Butes, a servant of Anchises.
- Butes, a warrior who fought under Aeneas and was killed by Camilla.
