= Sicelus =

Greek mythological figure, eponym of Sicily

In classical mythology, Siculus or Sicelus (Ancient Greek: Σικελός, romanized: Sikelos, lit. 'a Sicel' or 'of Sicily') may refer to two distinct figures:

- Sicelus, also called Scellis (Σκέλλις), a Thracian leader who quarrelled over Pancratis, daughter of Aloeus, with another chief Hecetorus, and they eventually slaughtered each other. In another account, Hecetor was called his father and the quarrel was with his brother Agassamenus. In any case, they both died at the hands of each other.
- Siculus or Sicelus, a legendary king and son of Italus or else of Neptune (Poseidon). Thucydides and other Greek historians have suggested that he was the legendary progenitor of the Sicels (or Siculi), an Italic people who colonised Sicily three hundred years before the Ancient Greeks in 1050 BCE. Sicelus was received as a guest by King Morges of the Oenotrians, and set up a kingdom for himself, dividing the Italian nation. After his crossing to Sicily the island was called after him which was originally called Sicania after a previous legendary King called Sicanus.
