= Erysichthon of Thessaly =

King of Greek mythology

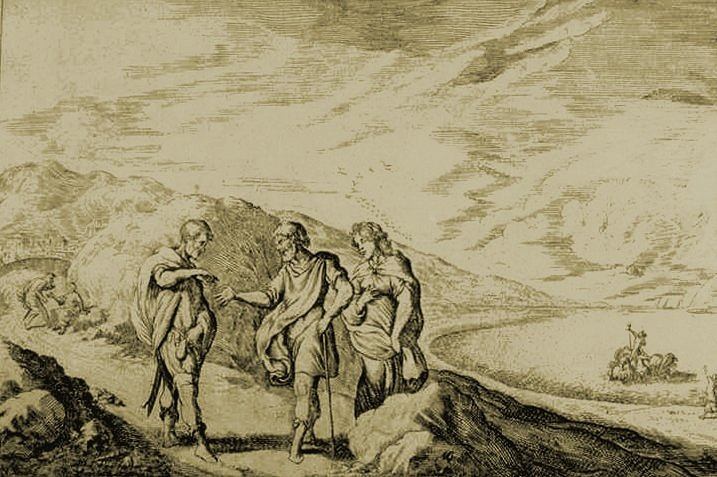
Erysichthon Sells His Daughter Mestra, engraving by Johann Wilhelm Baur

In Greek mythology, Erysichthon (/ˌɛrɪˈsɪkθɒn/; Ancient Greek: Ἐρυσίχθων ὁ Θεσσαλός, lit. 'earth-tearer'), also anglicised as Erisichthon, was a king of Thessaly. He was sometimes called Aethon.

== Family ==
Erysichthon was the son of King Triopas possibly by Hiscilla, daughter of Myrmidon and thus, brother of Iphimedeia and Phorbas.

In some accounts, however, he was called instead the son of Myrmidon possibly by Peisidice, daughter of Aeolus and Enarete, and thus, brother to Antiphus, Actor, Dioplethes, Eupolemeia and possibly Hiscilla as well.

Erysichthon was the father of Mestra, the shapeshifting lover of Poseidon.

== Mythology ==
=== Callimachus ===
Erysichthon once took twenty men with him to the sacred grove of Demeter, where he cut down a black poplar tree where tree nymphs gathered around to dance; the tree groaned as he wounded it. Demeter, feeling the tree's discomfort at once, flew down to the grove. Taking a mortal woman's form, she advised Erysichthon against cutting down the tree, warning him of Demeter's wrath. Erysichthon rudely told her to leave, threatening to strike her down with his axe and saying he needed the tree to build an extension for his house where he could hold feasts. Returning to her true divine form, Demeter took revenge. She sent insatiable hunger to him, and no matter how much he ate and drank, he could never satisfy his hunger or his thirst (the latter condition had been inflicted on him by Dionysus, who was just as angry as Demeter). Even his parents refused to visit him, and he ended up wasting all his wealth for food. He also sold all of his belongings to gain money to buy food. In the end, he becomes a beggar living off the crumbs thrown at him by those passing by.

=== Ovid ===
Erysichthon once ordered all trees in the sacred grove of Ceres (the Roman equivalent of Demeter) to be cut down. One huge oak was covered with votive wreaths, a symbol of every prayer Ceres had granted, and so the men refused to cut it down. Erysichthon grabbed an axe and cut it down himself, killing a dryad nymph in the process. The nymph's dying words were a curse on Erysichthon.

Ceres responded to the nymph's curse and punished him by entreating Fames, the spirit of unrelenting and insatiable hunger, to place herself in his stomach. Food acted like fuel on a fire: The more he ate, the hungrier he got. Erysichthon sold all his possessions to buy food, but was still hungry. At last, he sold his own daughter Mestra into slavery. The latter was freed from slavery by her former lover Poseidon, who gave her the gift of shape-shifting into any creature at will to escape her bonds. Erysichthon used her shape-shifting ability to sell her numerous times to make money to feed himself, but no amount of food was enough. Eventually, Erysichthon ate himself in hunger. Nothing of him remained the following morning.

=== Hyginus ===
Hyginus, calling him Triopas (which is his father's name in other versions), wrote that Erysichthon tore down a temple of Demeter wishing to build a roof for his house. She then sent hunger to him as with all other versions, that no amount of food could satisfy. Near the end of his life a snake was sent to plague him, and afterwards was put among the stars (the constellation Ophiuchus) by Demeter herself, as was the snake, to continue to inflict its punishment on Erysichthon.

=== Gigantomachy ===
On the Pergamon Altar, which depicts the battle of the gods against the Giants (also known as the Gigantomachy), surviving remains depict what seems to have been Demeter fighting a Giant labelled "Erysichthon," like the Thessalian king.

== Mythic interpretation ==
Palaephatus, who was trying to rationalize the Greek myths in his On Unbelievable Tales (Ancient Greek: Περὶ ἀπίστων ἱστοριῶν, peri apistōn historiōn), wrote that Erysichthon was a rich Thessalian man who became poor. He had a beautiful daughter, Mestra. Men who wanted to marry her gave horses, cows, sheep or whatever Mestra wanted. The Thessalians seeing the livelihood of Erysichthon piling up said "from Mestra came horse and cow and other things" (ἐγένετο ἐκ Μήστρας αὐτῷ καὶ ἵππος καὶ βοῦς καὶ τἄλλα, egeneto ek Mēstras autōi kai hippos kai bous kai talla), and this is how the myth developed.

Müller thinks that the traditions concerning Triopas and Erysichthon (from έρευείρη, gobigo) belong to an agricultural religion, which, at the same time, refers to the infernal regions.

== See also ==
- Mardylas
- Paraebius
- Polyphagia
  - Tarrare
  - Charles Domery
- Rhoecus of Cnidus
- Tantalus
