= Hiscilla =

In Greek mythology, Hiscilla (Ἴσχυλλα, Ischylla) was a Phthian princess as daughter of King Myrmidon and possibly Peisidice (daughter of Aeolus), thus sister of Antiphus, Actor, Dioplethes, Eupolemeia and probably Erysichthon who was otherwise known as her son by Triopas. By the latter, she also became the mother of Phorbas and Iphimedeia.
