= Evenius =

Ancient Greek seer

Euenius (Εὑήνιος) or Peithenius (Πειθήνιος) was an Ancient Greek legendary seer from Apollonia, Illyria, whose story survives in the accounts of Herodotus and Conon. The somewhat more detailed version of Herodotus is as follows.

== Mythology/History ==
=== Herodotus ===
Euenius was one of the most distinguished citizens of Apollonia and one night, when he was tending the sacred sheep of Helios, which the noble Apolloniates had to do in turns, the flock was attacked by wolves, and sixty sheep were killed. Euenius said nothing of the occurrence, but intended to purchase new sheep and thus to make up for the loss. But the thing became known and Euenius was brought to trial. He was deprived of his office and his eyes were put out as a punishment for his carelessness and negligence. Hereupon the earth ceased to produce fruit and the sheep of Helios ceased to produce young. Two oracles were consulted and the answer was that Euenius had been punished unjustly for the death of the flock; the gods themselves had sent the wolves. The calamity afflicting Apollonia would not cease until Euenius received all the reparation he desired.

A number of citizens accordingly waited upon Euenius, and without mentioning the oracles, they asked him what reparation he would demand if the Apolloniatae should be willing to make any. Euenius, in his ignorance of the oracles' decree, merely asked for two acres of the best land in Apollonia and the finest house in the city. The deputies then said that the Apollonians would grant him what he asked for, in accordance with the oracle. Euenius was indignant when he heard how he had been deceived; but the gods gave him a compensation by bestowing upon him the gift of prophecy. Herodotus presents this as a historical event of the recent past, but he anecdote attests to the divine introduction of prophecy, rather than a real biographical event.

=== Conon ===
The account of Conon is generally the same, only it uses the name "Peithenius" instead of "Euenius", and presents it more as a mythological tale than a historical event. Pithenius was tasked to pasture Helios' sacred flocks, only for him to fall asleep while on duty and have the flock devoured by wolves. The other Apolloniates gouged out his eyes for this, but then the earth grew barren and no longer bore fruit, as a result of Helios' anger towards them; he only relented after the Apolloniates had propitiated Peithenios by craft, and by two suburbs and a house of his choice. Differences between the two versions include that the latter makes no mention of the citizens' intent to deceive him, and hints that his prophetic abilities were inherited by his descendants. Indeed, Herodotus writes of Euenius's son Deiphonus who was said to have been raised in Corinth and was a seer for the Greek army during the Greco-Persian wars; yet Herodotus adds that some believed Deiphonus to have falsely claimed descent from Euenius.

== See also ==
- Cattle of Helios
- Odyssey
- Alcyoneus
- Mardylas

== Bibliography ==
- Herodotus, Histories with an English translation by A. D. Godley. Cambridge. Harvard University Press. 1920.
- Ustinova, Yulia (2009). Caves and the Ancient Greek Mind: Descending Underground in the Search for Ultimate Truth. New York City, New York: Oxford University Press. ISBN 978-0-19-954856-9.
