= Aethalides (sailor) =

Tyrrhenian sailor in Greek mythology

In Greek mythology, Aethalides (/ɪˈθælɪdiːz, iːˈθælɪdiːz/; Ancient Greek: Αἰθαλίδης, romanized: Aithalides, lit. 'son of the soot-colored' or 'smoky one') was one of the Tyrrhenian sailors who tried to delude Dionysus. He was turned into a dolphin by the god.

== Mythology ==
The following account from Hyginus tells the myth about Aethalides and the rest of the crew:

"When the Tyrrhenians, later called Tuscans, were on a piratical expedition, Father Liber [i.e. Dionysus], then a youth, came on their ship and asked them to take him to Naxos. When they had taken him on and wished to debauch him because of his beauty, Acoetes, the pilot, restrained them, and suffered at their hands. Liber, seeing that their purpose remained the same, changed the oars to thyrsi, the sails to vine-leaves, the ropes to ivy; then lions and panthers leapt out. When they saw them, in fear they cast themselves into the sea, and even in the sea he changed them to a sort of beast. For whoever leaped overboard was changed into dolphin shape, and from this dolphins are called Tyrrhenians, and the sea Tyrrhenian. They were twelve in number with the following names: Aethalides, Medon, Lycabas, Libys, Opheltes, Melas, Alcimedon, Epopeus, Dictys, Simon, Acoetes. The last was the pilot, whom Liber saved out of kindness.
