= Platanus (mythology) =

Greek mythological figure

In Greek mythology, Platanus (Ancient Greek: Πλάτανος, romanized: Platanos, lit. 'plane tree') is the daughter of the Thessalian king Aloeus and the sister of the Aloadae giants, who attacked the gods. Platanus was said to be as big as her brothers. Her brief tale survives in the chronicles of a Byzantine scholar of the twelfth century, Nicephorus Basilacius.

== Family ==
Platanus was the daughter of Aloeus, the stepfather of the Aloadae, presumably by his wife Iphimedeia, the Aloadae's mother. She also had a sister named Elate.

== Mythology ==
Platanus was a very beautiful girl, and as great in stature as her enormous brothers and sister. When Zeus with a lightning bolt slew the Aloadae for trying to wage war against the very heavens, Platanus was so sorrowful her shape change to that of a tree bearing her name, the plane tree, keeping the great size and beauty she had in her previous life. A similar fate befell her sister Elate, who transformed into a fir tree for the same reason.

== See also ==
- Cyparissus
- Heliades
- Niobe

== Bibliography ==
- Basilaces, Nicephorus (2016). The Rhetorical Exercises of Nikephoros Basilakes: Progymnasmata from Twelfth-century Byzantium. Translated by Jeffrey Beneker. Cambridge, MA: Harvard University Press. ISBN 978-0-674-66024-3.
- Buxton, Richard (2009). Forms of Astonishment: Greek Myths of Metamorphosis. Oxford University Press. ISBN 978-0-19-924549-9.
- Fontenrose, Joseph Eddy (1981). Orion: The Myth of the Hunter and the Huntress. University of California Press. ISBN 0-520-09632-0.
