= Pancratis =

In Greek mythology, Pancratis (Ancient Greek: Παγκρατίς, lit. 'she who has every power', 'all-powerful' or 'possessing total strength') or Pancrato (Ancient Greek: Παγκρατώ, romanized: Pankratō) was the daughter of Aloeus and Iphimedeia, and the sister of Otus and Ephialtes.

== Mythology ==
According to Diodorus Siculus, Thracian pirates, led by Butes, raided the coast of Thessaly. Landing in Achaea Phthiotis, they came upon women celebrating the rites of Dionysus near Mount Drius. As the Thracians attacked, the women scattered: some fled to the sea, others to the mountain. A maid named Coronis was seized by Butes and forced to lie with him. In her anger, she called upon Dionysus for help, and the god struck Butes with madness, causing him to throw himself into a well and perish.

After the death of Butes, the remaining Thracians seized other women from among the celebrants, including Iphimedeia and her daughter Pancratis, and carried them off to the island of Strongyle (Naxos). There they appointed Agassamenus as king. Pancratis' beauty immediately caused rivalry among the Thracian leaders: Sicelus and Hecetorus quarreled over her and killed one another. Pancratis was given in marriage to Agassamenus, who also appointed one of his friends as his lieutenant and united Iphimedeia to him in marriage.

Aloeus then sent his sons Otus and Ephialtes in search of their mother and sister. The brothers sailed to Strongyle, defeated the Thracians in battle, and captured the city. Some time afterward, Pancratis died.

Parthenius, in his Erotica Pathemata, preserves an account from the second book of the Naxiaca of Andriscus. In this version, two Thracian leaders, Scellis and Agassamenus, the sons of Hecetor, set out from Strongyle and plundered the Peloponnese and surrounding islands before reaching Thessaly. There they captured many women, including Iphimedeia and Pancratis. Both men fell in love with Pancratis, fought over her, and killed each other.
