= Ascra =

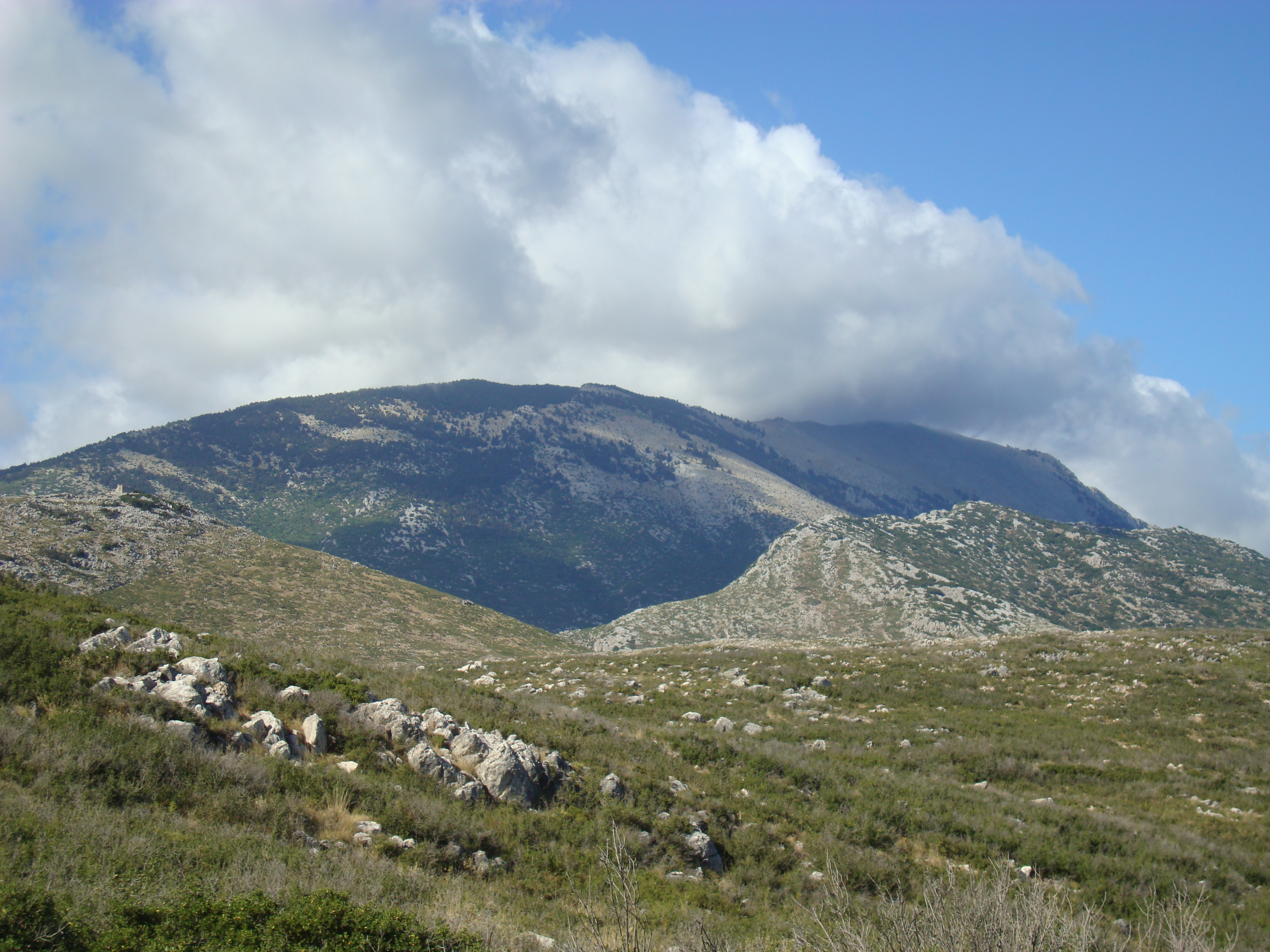
- Mount Helicon, upon which the town of Ascra was located
- Interactive map of Ascra
- Location within Greece Location within Europe
- Coordinates: 38°19′37″N 23°04′27″E
- Country: Greece
- Time zone: UTC+1 (CET)
  - Summer (DST): UTC+2 (CEST)

Ascra or Askre (Ancient Greek: Ἄσκρη, romanized: Áskrē) was a town in ancient Boeotia which is best known today as the home of the poet Hesiod. It was located upon Mount Helicon, less than seven and a half miles west of Thespiae.

== History ==
In the Works and Days, Hesiod says that his father was driven from Aeolian Cyme to Ascra by poverty, only to find himself situated in a most unpleasant town (lines 639–40):

He settled in a miserable village near Helicon,
Ascra, vile in winter, painful in summer, never good.

The 4th century BCE astronomer and general Eudoxus thought lowly of Ascra's climate. However, other writers speak of Ascra as abounding in corn, Corinthian hunchbacks, and wine.

By the time Eudoxus wrote, the town had been all but destroyed (by Thespiae sometime between 700 and 650 BCE), a loss commemorated by a similarly lost Hellenistic poem, which opened: "Of Ascra there isn't even a trace anymore" (Ἄσκρης μὲν οὐκέτ' ἐστὶν οὐδ' ἴχνος). This apparently was a hyperbole, for in the 2nd century CE, Pausanias could report that a single tower, though not much else, still stood at the site.

== Mythology ==
According to a lost poetic Atthis by one Hegesinous, a maiden by the name of Ascra lay with Poseidon and bore a son Oeoclus who, together with the Aloadae, founded the town named for his mother.
