= Clytus (mythology) =

Several figures in Greek mythology

In Greek mythology, Clytus (Ancient Greek: Κλύτος) is a name that may refer to:

- Clytus, a Trojan soldier who killed three Greeks in the Trojan War.
- Clytus, a warrior killed by Perseus in the battle against Phineus.
- Clytus, a son of Aegyptus who was killed by the Danaid Autodice.
- Clytus, a son of Temenus and his successor as king of Argos.
- Clytus, a son of the Athenian Pallas, who, together with his brother Butes, is sent alongside Cephalus to Aeacus to ask for assistance against Minos.
