= Tarsus (Bithynia) =

Town in ancient Bithynia

Coordinates: 40°44′45″N 30°28′46″E

Tarsus or Tarsos (Ancient Greek: Ταρσός) was a town in ancient Bithynia, on the inland road east of Nicomedia. It is mentioned by Stephanus of Byzantium.

Its site is located near Tarsiye in Asiatic Turkey.
