= Lofkënd =

Archaeological site in Albania

Lofkënd is an archaeological site near Ballsh, in western Albania.

== Description ==
The site is a large tumulus in which 100 burials have been discovered so far. 85 of them date from the 15th to the 8th century BC. The area was part of southern Illyria in Antiquity and today contains several important archaeological sites of different time periods, starting from the Neolithic and Bronze Age. The Lofkënd site is important for the research and understanding of Illyria's prehistory and proto-history. The graves have differences in the quantity and quality of the goods found in them. They also vary in the way of burial, as two-thirds of the bodies were buried unburned, while one-third were cremated in clay urns. In some of the graves which date to the 9th century BC there is more than one body, something that indicates the usage of family graves. In addition to the ancient graves, 15 graves were added in the 19th and early 20th century.
