= MDG Achievement Fund =

International cooperation mechanism

Millennium Development Goals Achievement Fund
- Abbreviation: MDG-F
- Formation: 2007
- Type: Fund
- Legal status: inactive
- Headquarters: New York City, U.S.
- Head: Bruno Moro
- Website: http://www.mdgfund.org/

The Millennium Development Goals Achievement Fund (MDG-F) was an international cooperation mechanism committed to eradicating poverty and inequality and to accelerating progress towards the Millennium Development Goals (MDGs) worldwide. Its aim was to improve livelihoods and to influence public policy, which made it responsive to the needs of the poorest populations.

Established in 2007 through an agreement between the Government of Spain and the United Nations Development Programme on behalf of the UN system, the MDG-F operated in 50 countries, working through more than 27 United Nations agencies in collaboration with citizens, civil society organizations and local, regional and national governments to target vulnerable groups and tackle multidimensional development challenges. With a total contribution of approximately US$900 million, the MDG-F has financed 130 joint programmes around the world, in eight areas: Children, Food Security and Nutrition; Gender Equality and Women's Empowerment; Environment and Climate Change; Youth, Employment and Migration; Democratic Economic Governance; Development and the Private Sector; Conflict Prevention and Peace-Building; and Culture and Development.

The MDG-F had three main objectives: to spur achievement of the MDGs by working across multiple sectors within target countries; to boost the effectiveness of international aid by increasing national leadership and ownership of development programmes; and to promote the “One UN” concept, the consolidation and streamlining of the UN's work at country level to speed up development operations and avoid duplication. As one of the largest international cooperation mechanisms devised to achieve the MDGs, the MDG-F's distinguishing approach was that it addressed development issues at multiple levels, combining the capacity to influence national-level policies with pilot projects that directly benefit citizens. In the area of gender equality, the MDG-F pioneered a dual strategy that involves both programmes that directly promote gender equality and women's empowerment, and, simultaneously, the mainstreaming of gender considerations within all the Fund's other programmatic areas.

== Areas of work ==
The MDG-F works in eight thematic areas:

Children, Food Security and Nutrition

Programmes in this area aimed at halting preventable deaths caused by child hunger and poor nutrition by providing low cost nutritional packages, engaging with pregnant and lactating mothers to ensure they are healthy and aware of key nutrition issues, increasing food security, and advocating for mainstreaming children's right to food into national plans and policies.

Gender and Women's Empowerment

The MDG-F worked directly and indirectly to promote gender equality and women's empowerment by improving legal systems to respect women's rights, particularly those of marginalized indigenous and ethnic minority groups, strengthening women's participation in economic life and in decision making processes, and reducing the incidence of gender-based violence.

Environment and Climate Change

The MDG-F contributed to building countries’ resilience to climate change, with a particularly focus on reducing its impact on the poorest populations. Programmes also focused on integrating the principles of sustainable development into country policies and programmes and reversing the loss of environmental resources.

Youth Employment and Migration

The MDG-F worked with governments to increase young people's chances of securing decent work, self-employment and entrepreneurship opportunities, as well as promoting respect for youths’ fundamental rights. Programmes also promoted socially inclusive development and worked to improve the situation of migrants.

Democratic Economic Governance

The MDG-F's programmes in this area strengthened governments’ capacity to supply quality water and sanitation and increased financial investments in water provision. Programmes focused particularly on including citizens, especially the poorest, in plans and policies regarding water provision and management.

Private Sector and Development

These Joint Programmes supported the development of pro-poor growth policies that increase the participation and benefits of the poor in private sector development. Interventions sought to bolster economic sectors where the poor are strongly represented, open markets to increase opportunities and stimulate small and medium enterprises.

Conflict Prevention and Peace-Building

These programmes addressed conflict both as a cause and as a symptom of poverty and hunger. Programmes fostered an enabling environment for development by increasing inter-ethnic understanding and improving livelihoods, focusing particularly on women and youth.

Culture and Development Programmes in this area focused on cultural rights, social inclusion and increasing the cultural heritage and tourism potential of countries, with the aim of reducing poverty, increasing employment and improving socio-economic opportunities for marginalized segments of the population. Projects worked with indigenous and ethnic groups and governments to increase cross-cultural understanding and to improve livelihoods for the poorest populations.

== Background ==
On December 18, 2006, UNDP Administrator Kemal Derviş and Spanish Secretary of State for International Cooperation Leire Pajín signed a landmark agreement to programme €528 million over the next four years through the UN system. The aim was to accelerate progress towards key Millennium Development Goals and related development goals in selected sectors and countries. This agreement paved the way for the establishment of the MDG Achievement Fund (MDG-F), which was launched in the first quarter of 2007. A subsequent additional contribution brought the total funding to approximately US$900 million.

When the MDG-F was established, 59 countries from Africa, Asia, Latin America and the Caribbean, the Arab States and Eastern Europe were considered eligible to participate in the eight rounds of calls for proposals. These 59 countries were determined by the Spanish Master Plan for International Cooperation 2005–2008. Forty-nine countries submitted successful proposals and received financing, with South Sudan becoming the 50th programme country when it split from Sudan in 2011.

The Spanish Master Plan 2005-2008 put heavy emphasis on Latin America and the Caribbean, a fact that is reflected in the number of countries from this region that were eligible for the call for proposals. The MDG-F funded programmes in 18 countries in Latin America and the Caribbean, followed by 11 in Africa, 8 in the Arab States, 7 in Asia and 6 in Eastern Europe.

== Structure ==
One of the particularities of the MDG-F's work was its “Delivering as One” approach. Building on the expertise of over 27 UN agencies, the MDG-F maximized their comparative advantage and devised multi-sectoral programmes that tackled complex development issues. Each of the 130 MDG-F joint programmes involved an average of six UN Agencies. This coordinated approach was often mirrored by governments with various ministries and local authorities engaged in the implementation of programmes. This approach was based on the conviction that many development challenges are multidimensional.

Participating UN Agencies were responsible for ensuring that programmes were developed in consultation with country Governments and civil society to address national MDG and related development priorities that form part of the United Nations Development Assistance Framework (UNDAF). The governing bodies and management structures of every Joint Programme were founded on principles of national ownership and leadership, transparency and mutual accountability towards citizens, in accordance with the Paris Declaration, with strong participation of the national government and the UN system. The UN Resident Coordinator played an important role as representative of the UN System in each country.

The structure of the Joint Programmes was based on a National Steering Committee (NSC) and a Programme Management Committee (PMC). The programmes were led by national and local partners, including governments, civil society organizations, and private sector entities, and are supported by UN agencies.

Evaluation

The MDG-F established a rigorous process of evaluation. Each of the 130 programmes was subject to an intermediate and final independent evaluation. In addition, nine countries were selected as part of a pilot initiative to develop independent and participatory country evaluations. In order to assess the impact and results of the MDG-F's mechanism, a Global and Thematic Evaluation is being carried out during 2013, aimed at identifying aspects to be improved for similar future cooperation mechanisms.

== Other initiatives ==
In addition to its programmes, the MDG-F established several global partnerships to distill lessons learned and to manage knowledge from this experience. For each thematic window, the MDG-F designated a knowledge convener to develop knowledge products. The MDG-F has also signed partnerships with leading research and advocacy institutions such as the Stockholm International Water Institute (SIWI), the Panamerican Alliance for Nutrition and Development, the Millennium Campaign, the Renewed Efforts Against Child Hunger (REACH) partnership, the International Indigenous Women's Forum and the Platform HD 2010 for Civic Engagement.

On Human Rights Day 2012, the MDG-F, in collaboration with the multi-media initiative Playing for Change, launched “A Better Place”, an anthem and campaign which unite musicians from around the world in a global call for action against inequality and for social justice. It also supported the United Nations Population Fund and other UN agencies in the September 2011 launch of a global initiative – 7 Billion Actions – which brought together governments, businesses, the media and individuals to confront the challenges and seize the opportunities offered when the world's population reached seven billion people.
