= Acoetes (Bacchic myth) =

Ancient Greek mythological fisherman

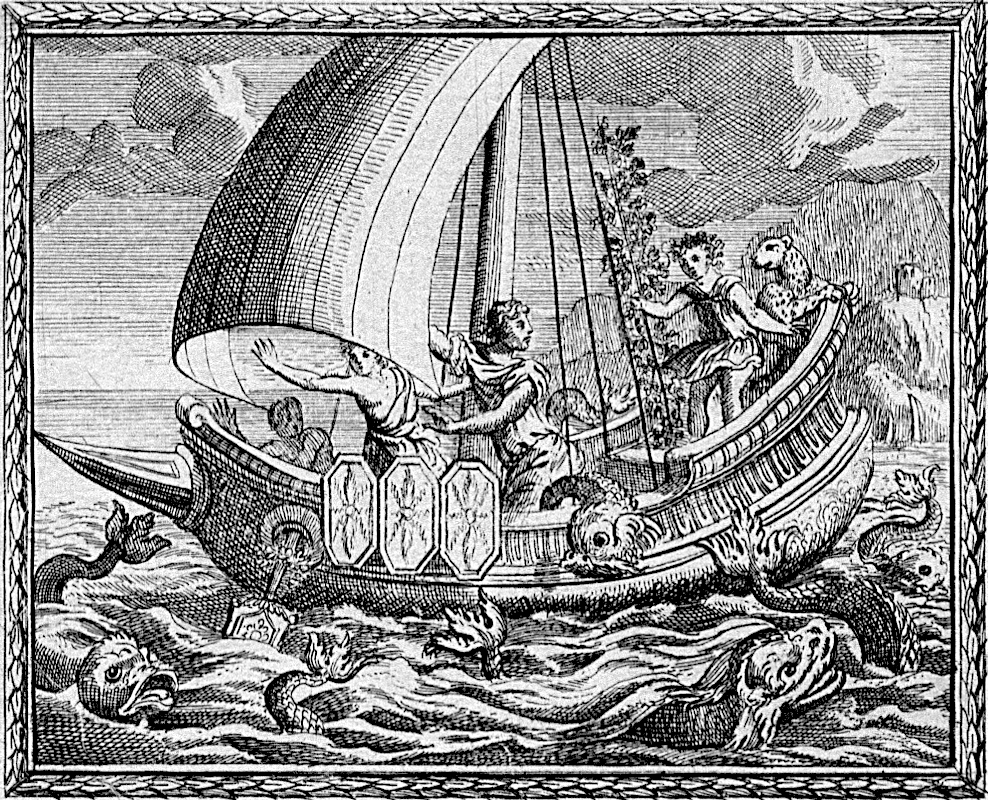
Sailors being transformed by Bacchus aboard Acoetes's ship.

In Greek mythology, Acoetes (Ancient Greek: Ἀκοίτης, romanized: Akoítēs, via Latin Ăcoetēs) was the fisherman known for helping the god Bacchus.

== Mythology ==
This Acoetes was, according to Ovid, the son of a poor fisherman in Maeonia, who served as pilot in a ship. After landing at mist sand, some of the sailors brought a beautiful sleeping boy on board with them. They had found him on the island and wished to take him with them. Acoetes, who recognized in the boy the god Bacchus, was unable to dissuade them from it. When the ship had reached the open sea, the boy awoke, and desired to be carried back to Naxos. The sailors promised to do so but did not keep their word. Hereupon the god showed himself to them in his own majesty: Vines began to twine round the vessel, and Bacchus stood crowned with grapes, holding his thyrsus (a staff with a pine cone on top, wrapped with vines and ivy leaves) and surrounded by panthers and tigers. The sailors, seized with madness, jumped into the sea and were turned into dolphins. Acoetes alone was saved and continued on his journey with Bacchus, returning to Naxos, where he was initiated in the Bacchic mysteries and became a priest of the god.

In Ovid's Pentheus and Bacchus, Acoetes was brought before the King to determine if Bacchus was truly a god. After listening to Acoetes tale of being on the ship with Bacchus, Pentheus ordered him jailed and tortured. However, in trying to imprison Acoetes "[l]ocks exploded...[d]oors flew open untouched. And untouched shackles fell off."

Hyginus, whose story on the whole agrees with that of Ovid, and all the other writers who mention this adventure of Bacchus, call the crew of the ship Tyrrhenian pirates and derive the name of the Tyrrhenian Sea from them.
