= Aethalides (Argonaut) =

Ancient Greek mythological figure

In Greek mythology, Aethalides (/ɪˈθælɪdiːz, iːˈθælɪdiːz/; Ancient Greek: Αἰθαλίδης, romanized: Aithalides, lit. 'son of the soot-colored' or 'smoky one') was one of the Argonauts together with his paternal step-brothers Erytus and Echion. He was a son of Hermes and Eupolemeia, a daughter of King Myrmidon of Phthia. Aethalides was born near the streams of Amphrysus.

== Mythology ==
Aethalides was the herald of the Argonauts, and had received from his father the faculty of remembering everything, even in Hades. He was further allowed to reside alternately in the upper and in the lower world. As his soul could not forget anything even after death, it remembered that from the body of Aethalides it had successively migrated into those of Euphorbus, Hermotimus, Pyrrhus, and at last into that of Pythagoras, in whom it still retained the recollection of its former migrations.
