= Eupolemeia =

In Greek mythology, Eupolemeia (Ancient Greek: Εὐπολέμεια) was a Phthian princess as daughter of King Myrmidon and possibly Peisidice (daughter of Aeolus), thus sister to Antiphus, Actor, Erysichthon, Dioplethes and Hiscilla. Eupolemeia consorted with Hermes and by him, she bore Aethalides near the streams of Amphrysus.
