= Archaeological Museum of Apolonia =

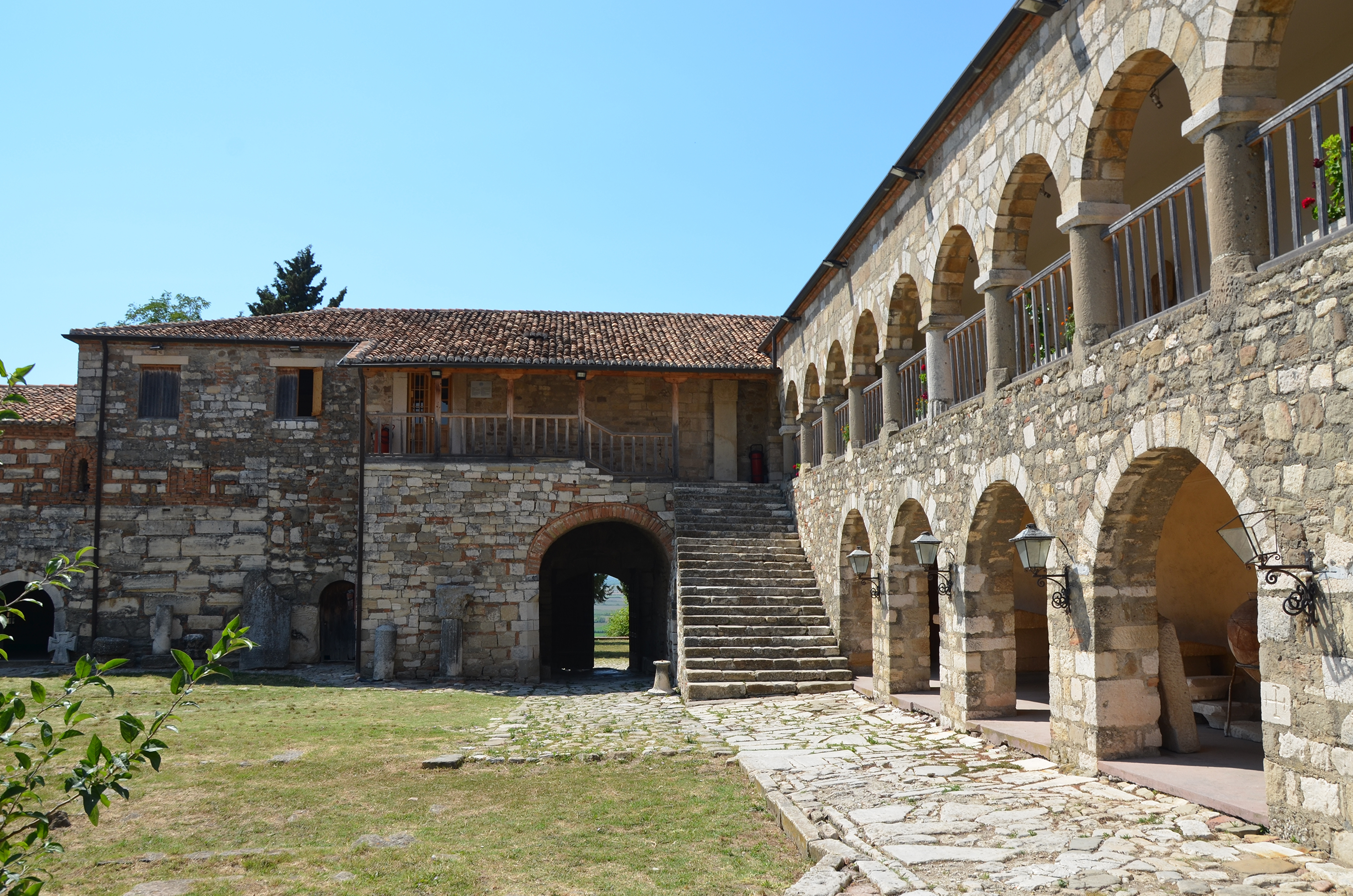
- The museum contains a collection of artifacts unearthed in the nearby ancient site of Apollonia.

- Location in Albania
- Established: 1958
- Dissolved: 1991
- Location: Fier County, Albania
- Coordinates: 40.720333°N 19.471722°E
- Type: Archaeological museum
- Website: apolloniaarchaeologicalpark.al

The Archaeological Museum of Apolonia (Albanian: Muzeu Arkeologjik Apoloni) is an archaeological museum approximately 8 km (5.0 mi) west of Fier, Albania. It was established in 1958. The museum contains artifacts unearthed nearby from the archaeological site of Apollonia and is close to the Ardenica Monastery.

== History ==
The first attempts to conduct excavations in Apollonia were made during World War I by Austrian archaeologists who mainly unearthed and explored the walls that encircled the city. Systematic excavations began in 1924 by a French archaeological mission directed by Leon Rey, who brought to light a complex of monuments at the center of the city. During the late 1920s and 1930s, Rey pressed for an archaeological museum to house the artifacts his team uncovered but lack of finance prolonged it. Finally on October 8, 1936 the collection of archaeological finds at Apollonia were exhibited in the government building in Vlorë, which suffered bombardment and looting during World War II. After the war, further archeological finds saw another campaign for a public museum, but in the Apollonia area. The archaeologists S. Anamali and H. Ceka successfully raised the finances needed to open a museum and the 1000 square meter museum opened in the village of Pojan, within the ancient site, in 1958. During the communist period the museum was viewed as a considerable success. A lot of excavations made by Albanian archaeologists during a 40-year period were exhibited in the museum. However, in 1991 it was looted and subsequently closed.

The Archaeological Museum of Apollonia National Park reopened in 2011 after being closed for 20 years. The museum's collection of over 688 important objects and their large number of ancient coins make it among the richest museums in the country. The project to restore the archaeological museum was launched in 2008 with a funding of $140,000 from UNESCO. The museum's collection had been stored in the Institute of Cultural Monuments in Tirana, Albania's capital, prior to reopening.

== Collection ==
The museum is housed in a 14th-century building which was previously the monastery of St. Mary. It is accessed via a double wooden door and a grand entrance on the west side. The museum has 7 pavilions, a gallery and 2 porticos. The bulk of the collection is housed in 6 rooms on the ground floor to the north and west of the complex. An impressive collection of statues is located in a portico on the east side and number of historically important frescoes remain in the building from medieval times; these are mainly housed in the refectory. Fragments of inscriptions and other spolia can be found on the walls and the museum also has a collection of medieval mosaics.
