= Aloeus =

Ancient Greek mythological figures

Aloeus (/əˈloʊjuːs/; Ancient Greek: Ἀλωεύς) can indicate one of the two characters in Greek mythology:

- Aloeus or Haloeus, a Thessalian prince as the son of Poseidon and princess Canace, daughter of King Aeolus and Enarete. He was the brother of Hopleus, Nireus, Epopeus and Triops. His first wife was his niece Iphimedeia, and later Eriboea, daughter of Eurymachus. In some accounts, Aloeus was the father of Salmoneus who founded Elis, the girls Elate and Platanus, the twin giants, Otus and Ephialtes, collectively known as the Aloadae and lastly, the maiden Pancratis. These giants made war on the gods and captured the god Ares in a bag. Aloeus's wife Eriboea reported this to the gods, for which Aloeus had her flayed alive. In Virgil's Aeneid, the sons of Aloeus were found in the underworld and there Aeneas sees them being punished by Rhadamanthus. This scene from Virgil was a precursor to Dante's depiction of Hell. Aloeus was credited to have founded the city of Alus in Aetolia.
- Aloeus, son of Helios and possibly Antiope or Perse, who received from his father the sovereignty over the district of Asopia (Sicyon). He was the father of Epopeus, his successor.
