= Myrmidon (hero) =

Greek mythical character

In Greek mythology, Myrmidon (/ˈmɜːrmɪdən/ or /ˈmɜːrmɪdɒn/; Ancient Greek: Μυρμιδόνος, romanized: Myrmidōn or Murmidónos) was the eponymous ancestor of the Myrmidons in one version of the myth.

== Family ==
Myrmidon was the son of Zeus and Eurymedusa, daughter of Cleitor (Cletor) or of the river god Achelous.

He married Peisidice, daughter of Aeolus and Enarete, and by her became the father of Antiphus and Actor. Also given as his sons were Erysichthon and Dioplethes, father of Perieres, although Erysichthon and Perieres have been ascribed with different parentage. Also, Myrmidon had two daughters: Eupolemeia (mother of the Argonaut Aethalides by Hermes) and Hiscilla (mother of Phorbas by Triopas).

== Mythology ==
Zeus was said to have approached Eurymedusa in the form of an ant (Greek μύρμηξ, myrmēx), which was where her son's name came from; others say that Myrmex was the name of Eurymedusa's mortal husband, and that it was his shape that Zeus assumed to approach her.
