= Aloadae =

Giants from Greek mythology

- Twin giants of Thessaly
- Member of the Thessalian Royal Family
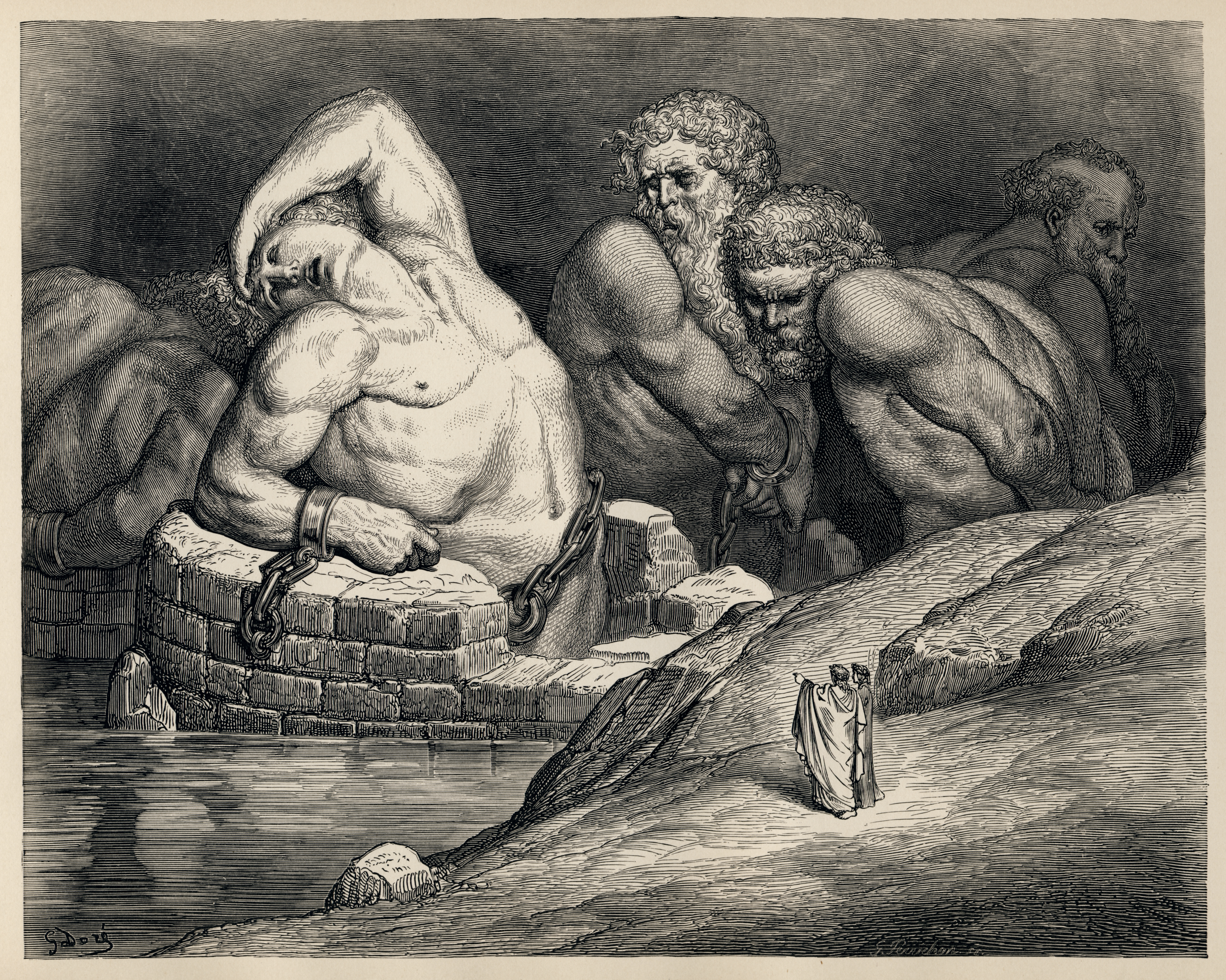
- Titans and Giants, including Ephialtes on the left, in Gustave Doré's illustrations to Dante's Divine Comedy.
- Other names: Aloads includes: Otus (Otos) and Ephialtes
- Abode: Thessaly

Genealogy
- Parents: Poseidon or Aloeus (father); Iphimedeia (mother)
- Siblings: Pancratis (Pancrato), Elate, Platanus

In Greek mythology, the Aloadae (/ˌæloʊˈeɪdiː/) or Aloads (Ancient Greek: Ἀλωάδαι Aloadai) were Otus or Otos (Ὦτος means "insatiate") and Ephialtes (Ἐφιάλτης, which means "nightmare"), Thessalian sons of Princess Iphimedia, wife of Aloeus, by Poseidon, whom she induced to make her pregnant by going to the seashore and disporting herself in the surf or scooping seawater into her bosom. From Aloeus, sometimes their real father, they received their patronymic, the Aloadae. They had a sister Pancratis (Pancrato) who was renowned for her great beauty.

== Mythology ==
The Aloads were strong and aggressive giants, growing by nine fingers every month. Nine fathoms tall aged nine, they were only outshone in beauty by Orion.

=== War with the gods ===
The brothers wanted to storm Mount Olympus and gain Artemis for Otus and Hera for Ephialtes. Their plan - the construction of a pile of mountains atop which they would confront the gods - is described by different authors (including Homer, Virgil, and Ovid), and occasionally changed by translators. Mount Olympus is usually said to be the bottom mountain, with Mounts Ossa and Pelion upon Ossa as second and third, either respectively or vice versa. Homer says that the Aloadae were killed by Apollo before they had any beards, consistent with their being bound to columns in the Underworld by snakes, with the nymph of the Styx in the form of an owl over them.

According to another version of their struggle against the Olympians, alluded to so briefly that it must have been already familiar to the epic's hearers, they managed to kidnap Ares and hold him in a bronze jar, a storage pithos, for thirteen months (a lunar year).

"And that would have been the end of Ares and his appetite for war, if the beautiful Eriboea, the young giants' stepmother, had not told Hermes what they had done", Dione related.

Alerted by Eriboea, Hermes rescued Ares.

The brothers died on the island of Naxos, when Artemis changed herself into a doe and jumped between them. The Aloadae, not wanting her to get away, threw their spears and simultaneously killed each other. In another version, either Apollo killed the Aloadae in their attempt to scale the mountains to the heavens, or Otus tried to rape Artemis, and Apollo sent the deer in their midst, provoking their deaths.

Their two sisters, Elate and Platanus, mourned their deaths so much they were changed into trees, a fir and a plane tree respectively.

=== Other stories ===
According to Diodorus, the Aloadae are Thessalian heroes who were sent out by their father Aloeus to fetch back their mother Iphimedeia and their sister Pancratis, who had been carried off by Thracians. After having overtaken and defeated the Thracians in the island of Strongyle (Naxos), they settled there as rulers over the Thracians. But soon after, they killed each other in a dispute which had arisen between them, and the Naxians worshiped them as heroes.

In all these traditions, the Aloadae were represented as only remarkable for their gigantic physical strength; but there was another story which placed them in a different light. Pausanias related that they were believed to have been the first of all men who worshiped the Muses on Mount Helicon, and to have consecrated this mountain to them; but they worshiped only three Muses — Melete, Mneme and Aoede. They were bringers of civilization, founding the cities and teaching culture to humanity. They were venerated specifically in Naxos and Boeotian Ascra, two cities they founded. Besides these two, the foundation of the town of Aloïum in Thessaly was ascribed to them.

Ephialtes (lit. "he who jumps upon") is also the Greek word for "nightmare", and Ephialtes was sometimes considered the daimon of nightmares. In the Inferno of Dante's Divine Comedy Ephialtes is one of six giants placed in the great pit that separates the eighth and ninth circles of Hell, Fraud and Cocytus, respectively. He is chained as punishment for challenging Jupiter.

== Paleontology ==
Otozoum, the ichnogenus of sauropodomorph dinosaur, was named after Otus.
