= Ancient Greek flood myths =

Great floods throughout ancient history as described in Greek mythology

Greek mythology describes various great floods throughout ancient history. Differing sources refer to the flood of Ogyges, the flood of Deucalion, and the flood of Dardanus, though often with similar or even contradictory details. Like most flood myths, these stories often involve themes of divine retribution, the savior of a culture hero, and the birth of a nation or nations. In addition to these floods, Greek mythology also says the world was periodically destroyed by fire, such as in the myth of Phaëton.

== Sources ==
"Many great deluges have taken place during the nine thousand years, for that is the number of years which have elapsed since the time of which I am speaking; and during all of this time and through so many changes, there has never been any considerable accumulation of the soil coming down from the mountains, as in other places, but the earth has fallen away all round and sunk out of sight. The consequence is, that in comparison of what then was, there are remaining only the bones of the wasted body, as they may be called, as in the case of small islands, all the richer and softer parts of the soil having fallen away, and the mere skeleton of the land being left."
Plato's Critias (111b)

Plato makes reference to great floods in several of his dialogues, including Timaeus, Critias, and Laws. In Timaeus (22) and in Critias (111–112) he describes the "great deluge of all", specifying the one survived by Deucalion and Pyrrha, as having been preceded by 9,000 years of history before the time of Solon, during the 10th millennium BCE. In Laws, Book III, argues that a great flood had occurred ten thousand years before his time, as opposed to only "one or two thousand years that have elapsed" since the discovery of music, and other inventions. Plato also alludes to a well-known event of great destruction, in Statesman (270), where "only a small part of the human race survives", presumably also referring to the flood of Deucalion. In addition, the texts report that "many great deluges have taken place during the nine thousand years" since Athens and Atlantis were preeminent.

== Ogyges ==
The Ogygian flood is so called because it occurred in the time of Ogyges, a mythical king of Attica. The words Ogyges and Ogygian are synonymous with "primeval", "primal" and "earliest dawn". Others say he was the founder and king of Thebes. In many traditions the Ogygian flood is said to have covered the whole world and was so devastating that Attica remained without kings until the reign of Cecrops.

== Deucalion ==
The Deucalion legend as told by the Bibliotheca has some similarity to other deluge myths such as the Epic of Gilgamesh (which Stephanie West writes was likely the source of this myth); the story of Noah's Ark in the Judeo-Christian telling; and the story of Manu's ark in the Hindu, Buddhist and Jain religions. The Titan Prometheus advised his son Deucalion to build a chest. All other men perished except for a few who escaped to high mountains. The mountains in Thessaly were parted, and all the world beyond the Isthmus and Peloponnese was overwhelmed. Deucalion and his wife Pyrrha, after floating in the chest for nine days and nights, landed on Parnassus. An older version of the story told by Hellanicus has Deucalion's "ark" landing on Mount Othrys in Thessaly. Another account has him landing on a peak, probably Phouka, in Argolis, later called Nemea. When the rains ceased, he sacrificed to Zeus. Then, at the bidding of Zeus, he threw stones behind him, and they became men, and the stones Pyrrha threw became women. The Bibliotheca gives this as an etymology for Greek Laos (λᾱός, 'people') as derived from laas ('stone'). The Megarians told that Megarus, son of Zeus and a Sithnid nymph, escaped Deucalion's flood by swimming to the top of Mount Gerania, guided by the cries of cranes.

=== From the Theogony of the Bibliotheca ===
According to the theogony of the Bibliotheca, Prometheus moulded men out of water and earth and gave them fire which, unknown to Zeus, he had hidden in a stalk of fennel. When Zeus learned of it, he ordered Hephaestus to nail Prometheus to Mount Caucasus, a Scythian mountain. Prometheus was nailed to the mountain and kept bound for many years. Every day an eagle swooped on him and devoured the lobes of his liver, which grew by night. That was the penalty that Prometheus paid for the theft of fire until Heracles afterwards released him.

Prometheus had a son named Deucalion. He, reigning in the regions about Phthia, married Pyrrha, the daughter of Epimetheus (the brother of Prometheus) and Pandora (the first woman fashioned by the gods). And when Zeus would destroy the men of the Bronze Age, Deucalion, by the advice of Prometheus, constructed a chest. Having stocked it with provisions, he embarked in it with Pyrrha. Zeus, by pouring heavy rain from heaven, flooded the greater part of Greece, so that all men were destroyed, except a few who fled to the high mountains in the neighbourhood as Peloponnesus was overwhelmed. But Deucalion, floating in the chest over the sea for nine days and as many nights, drifted to Parnassus, and there, when the rain ceased, he landed and made a sacrifice to Zeus, the god of Escape. And Zeus sent Hermes to him and allowed him to choose what he would, and he chose to get men.

At the bidding of Zeus he took up stones and threw them over his head, and the stones Deucalion threw became men, and the stones Pyrrha threw became women. Hence people were called metaphorically people (Laos) from laas, "a stone." And Deucalion had children by Pyrrha, first Hellen, whose father some say was Zeus, and second Amphictyon, who reigned over Attica after Cranaus, and third a daughter Protogonia, who became the mother of Aethlius by Zeus. Hellen had Dorus, Xuthus, and Aeolus by a nymph Orseis. Those who were called Greeks he named Hellenes (Ἕλληνες) after himself, and divided the country among his sons. Xuthus received Peloponnese and begat Achaeus and Ion by Creusa, daughter of Erechtheus, and from Achaeus and Ion the Achaeans and Ionians derive their names. Dorus received the country over against Peloponnese and called the settlers Dorians after himself.

Aeolus reigned over the regions about Thessaly and named the inhabitants Aeolians. He married Enarete, daughter of Deimachus, and begat seven sons, Cretheus, Sisyphus, Athamas, Salmoneus, Deion, Magnes, Perieres, and five daughters, Canace, Alcyone, Pisidice, Calyce, Perimede. Perimede had Hippodamas and Orestes by Achelous; and Pisidice had Antiphus and Actor by Myrmidon. Alcyone was married to Ceyx (son of Eosphorus), and both are described by several sources as having been transformed into halcyon birds, giving rise to the term halcyon days.

The motif of a weather deity who headed the pantheon causing the great flood and then the trickster who created men from clay saving man is also present in Sumerian Mythology, as Enlil, instead of Zeus, causes the flood, and Enki, rather than Prometheus, saves man. Stephanie West has written that this is perhaps due to the Greeks borrowing stories from the Near East.

=== Nannacus ===
Nannacus was a legendary king of Phrygia before the Flood of Deucalion. Nannacus predicted the Flood and had organized public prayers to avert this disaster. After Nannacus died, whom his subjects greatly mourned, came the Deluge of Deucalion.

== Dardanus ==
This one has the same basic story line. According to Dionysius of Halicarnassus, Dardanus left Pheneus in Arcadia to colonize a land in the North-East Aegean Sea. When Dardanus' deluge occurred, the land was flooded and the mountain where he and his family survived formed the island of Samothrace. He left Samothrace on an inflated skin to the opposite shores of Asia Minor and settled on Mount Ida. Due to the fear of another flood, they refrained from building a city and lived in the open for fifty years. His grandson Tros eventually moved from the highlands down to a large plain, on a hill that had many rivers flowing down from Ida above. There he built a city, which was named Troy after him. Today, we call the area "the Dardanelles" (formerly known as Hellespont), a narrow strait in northwestern Turkey that connects the Aegean Sea to the Sea of Marmara. The name is derived from Dardanus, an ancient city on the Asian shore of the strait, whose name was mythologized as deriving from Dardanus, the son of Zeus and Electra.
