= Aegiale (mother of Alcyone) =

Ancient Greek mythological figure

In Greek mythology, Aegiale, also Aegialeia or Aegialia, (Ancient Greek: Αἰγιάλη or Αἰγιάλεια, romanized: Aigialē, lit. 'shore', 'beach' or 'coastline') was the mother of Alcyone by Aeolus, according to the mythographer Hyginus. In other accounts, it is instead Enarete who is the mother of Alcyone by Aeolus.
