= Ceyx (disambiguation) =

Ceyx was a figure in Greek mythology, also included in Ovid's Metamorphoses.

Ceyx may also refer to:

- Ceyx (bird), a genus of kingfishers named for the Greek figure
- Ceyx (Neopaganism), a neopagan god named for the Greek figure
- Ceyx (father of Hippasus), an unrelated figure in Greek mythology, ally to Heracles
