= Demodice =

Several figures in Greek mythology

In Greek mythology, the name Demodice (Ancient Greek: Δημοδίκη) may refer to:

- Demodice, possibly the accurate name of Demoditas, one of the Danaides as daughter of Danaus. She married a paternal cousin whom she eventually killed on their wedding night following the instructions of her father.
- Demodice, daughter of Agenor, also known as Demonice.
- Demodice or Demodika (also known as Gorgopis, Themisto, or Biadice), second wife of either Cretheus or Athamas, who unsuccessfully attempted to seduce Phrixus and in revenge accused him of sexual abuse, which caused him to flee from his father's kingdom.
- Demodice, daughter of Rheximachus of Tegea. After Tegea had been at war with Phenea for a long time, the cities agreed to put an end to the conflict by electing a set of triplet brothers to represent each side and letting the victorious side be determined in a fight between them. The Tegeans sent the three sons of Rheximachus, brothers of Demodice, while the Pheneans sent the three sons of Demostratus, one of whom, Demodicus, was betrothed to Demodice. Two of Rheximachus' sons were killed in the fight, but the third brother, Critolaus, outwitted his opponents by pretending to flee from them and then slaying them one by one as they were pursuing him, and thus brought victory to Tegea. Demodice, however, mourned her fiancé Demodicus rather than celebrate the victory, and was killed by Critolaus for being unpatriotic. His mother charged him with the murder but he was acquitted.
- Demodice of Lydia, daughter of Leucothea and a father whose name is lost in the manuscript. During a festival of Aphrodite, she was raped by her brother Pactolus, who had failed to recognize her; upon realizing what he had done, Pactolus threw himself into the river Chrysorrhoos, which allegedly was renamed Pactolus after him.
- Demodice, mother by Corybas of Scamander. Her son accidentally saw the goddess Rhea while taking part in her sacred mysteries; driven insane by her, he ran off and fell into the river Xanthus, which from that circumstance received the second name Scamander.
- Demodice, one of the sacrificial victims of Minotaur.
