= Subiaco Ephebe =

Coordinates: 41°55′36″N 13°04′40″E

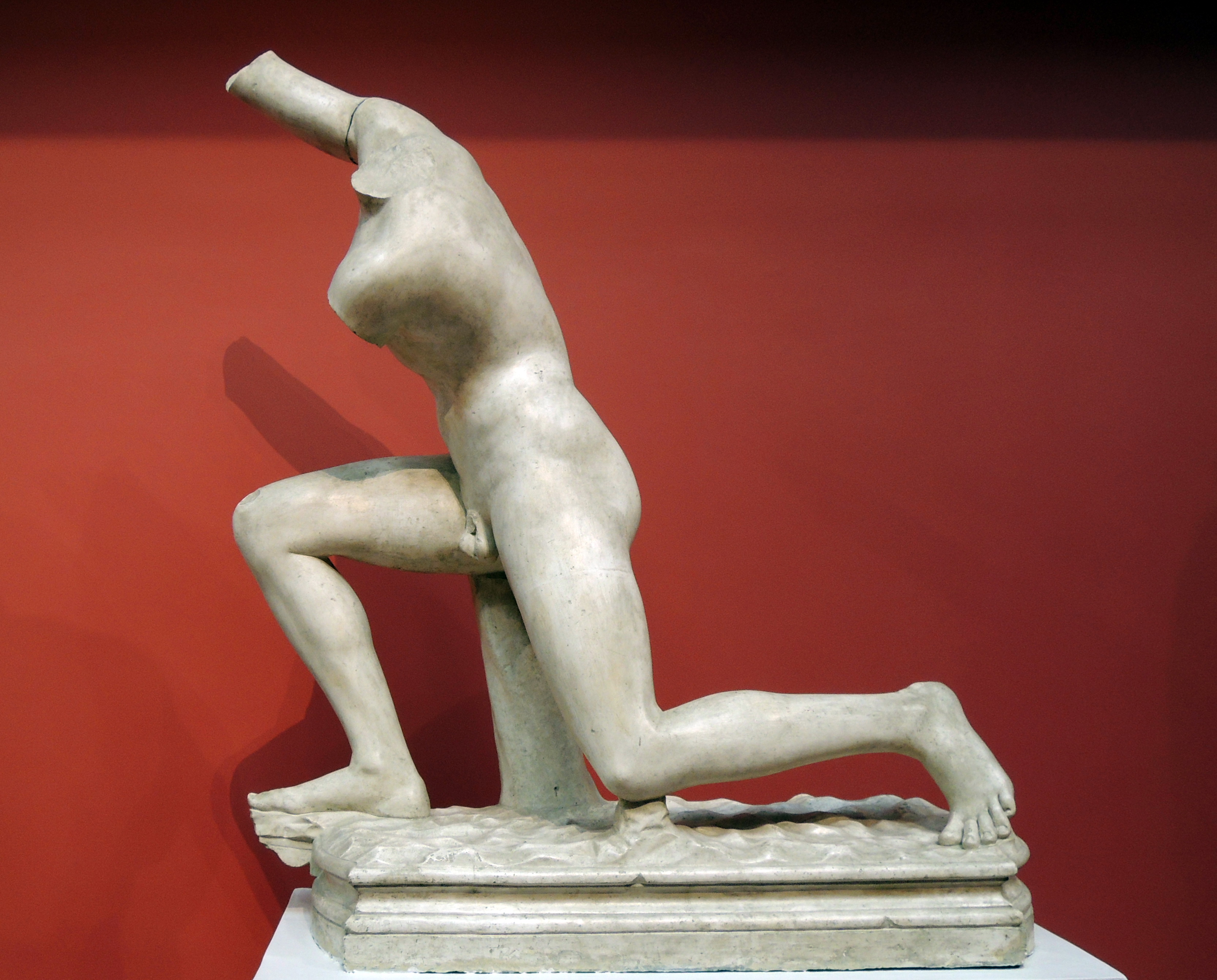
Casting in Pushkin museum

The Subiaco Ephebe (or the Youth from Subiaco) is a sculpture of a young man approaching puberty found on the site of the Neronian Villa Sublaquensis at Subiaco (Roman Sublaqueum) in the upper Aniene valley, Lazio, Italy. The headless marble is a copy of a lost Greek bronze, as evidenced by an awkward tree-trunk support and "the failure of the total silhouette to keep manageably within the boundaries of a single block of stone", as Rhys Carpenter observes; it is unlikely to postdate Nero because of its find location. The date of the bronze original that it reflects is contested. When it was first found August Kalkmann gave it a date early in the fifth century BCE. but general opinion before World War II made it a work of the end of the fourth century in the turn towards Hellenistic style, to which Rhys Carpenter objected, suggesting instead that it belonged in the 60s or 70s of the fifth century. Brunilde Sismondo Ridgway, in a radical redating of the history of Greek sculpture, has placed it among classicising works of the first century BCE.

The athlete is shown in mid-stride, in an archaic convention of running. His left arm, now missing, once grazed his right knee. His right arm extends upwards and forwards. His right leg advances with a bent knee. His left knee neither touches the ground nor supports the weight of his violently twisted torso: Carpenter compared it to the lower half of the Stumbling Niobid

The sculpture is conserved in the Museo Nazionale delle Terme, Rome.
