= Aristonidas =

Ancient Greek sculptor living before the 1st century

Aristonidas was a sculptor of ancient Greece, one of whose productions is mentioned by Pliny the Elder as extant at Thebes in his time. This work was a statue of Athamas – the mythological Boeotian king who murdered his own son – in which bronze and iron had been mixed together, that the rust of the latter, showing through the brightness of the bronze, might have the appearance of a blush, and so might indicate the remorse of Athamas.
