= Tritogeneia (mythology) =

Greek mythological figures

In Greek mythology, Tritogeneia (Ancient Greek: Τριτυγένεια means "Born of Tritonis") may refer to the following:

- Tritogeneia, or Trigoneia (Τριγόνεια), daughter of Aeolus and Enarete, and wife of Minyas.
- Tritogeneia, an epithet of Athena.
- Tritogeneia, another name of Orion.
