= Magnes (son of Aeolus) =

Mythical king of Magnesia

In Greek mythology, Magnes (Ancient Greek: Μάγνης, romanized: Mágnēs) was a Thessalian prince who later on became the eponymous first king of Magnesia.

== Mythology ==
Magnes was the son of Zeus and Thyia, daughter of Deucalion, and brother of Makednos. In the Bibliotheca, Magnes was placed in the later generation of the Deucalionides, for this time he was the son of Aeolus and Enarete and brother to Aeolian progenitors: Cretheus, Sisyphus, Athamas, Salmoneus, Deion, Perieres, Canace, Alcyone, Pisidice, Calyce and Perimede.

Magnes married an unnamed naiad that bore him Dictys and Polydectes. The mother and the sons later emigrated and colonized the island of Seriphos. Polydectes became king of the island while his brother Dictys, a fisherman would later receive Danae and her son Perseus.

The scholiast of Euripides called Magnes' wife as Philodice and his sons, Eurynomus and Eioneus. Otherwise, Eustathius named his wife as a certain Meliboea and mentioned one son, Alector, and added that Magnes called the town of Meliboea at the foot of mount Pelion after his wife and the country of Magnesia after his own name.

Pierus, the father of Hyacinth by the Muse Clio, was also called a son of Magnes. According to Tzetzes, the latter was also said to have fathered Linus by Clio.

Comparative table of Magnes' family
Relation	Names	Sources							
Relation	Names	Hesiod	Scholia on Euripides	Apollodorus		Hyginus	Pausanias	Eustathius	Tzetzes
Parents	Zeus and Thyia	✓							
Parents	Aeolus and Enarete			✓					
Parents	Aeolus						✓		
Siblings	Macedon	✓							
Siblings	Cretheus			✓					
Siblings	Sisyphus			✓					
Siblings	Athamas			✓					
Consorts	Philodice		✓			-	-		
Consorts	Naiad nymph			✓					
Consorts	Meliboea							✓	
Consorts	Clio								✓
Children	Dictys	✓		✓					
Children	Polydectes	✓		✓		✓			
Children	Pierus				✓				
Children	Eurynomus		✓						
Children	Eioneus		✓				✓		
Children	Alector							✓	
Children	Linus								✓
