= Enipeus =

Enipeus or Enipeas may refer to:

- Enipeus (mythology), a river god in Greek mythology
- Enipeus (Elis), a river in rising near Salmone (Elis), Elis, Greece
- Enipeas (Thessaly), a river in Thessaly, Greece
- Enipeas (Pieria), a small river in Pieria (regional unit), Greece
- Enippeas, a town in Thessaly, Greece
