= Wedding of Ceyx =

Ancient Greek poem

The "Wedding of Ceyx" (Ancient Greek: Κήυκος γάμος, Kḗykos gámos) is a fragmentary Ancient Greek hexameter poem that was attributed to Hesiod during antiquity. The poem did not only deal with the wedding of its titular protagonist, but also Heracles's actions.

== Contents ==
The fragments that survive imply that the subject of the poem was not simply the wedding of a certain Ceyx, but Heracles' arrival at, and involvement in, the festivities. For this reason Merkelbach and West suppose that the poem should be regarded "as a member of that group of epics and epyllia that dealt with exploits of Heracles, like the Aspis and the Capture of Oechalia." The identity of the Ceyx whose marriage was the titular scene of the poem has been a matter of dispute. Merkelbach and West initially identified him with the ill-fated groom of the similarly ill-fated Alcyone: they were turned into birds for the hubris they showed in referring to one another as "Zeus" and "Hera". Given the poem's apparent focus upon Heracles, however, it is more likely that this Ceyx was actually the king of Trachis who was a nephew of Amphitryon, the great hero's stepfather.

The poem appears to have been popular for the witticisms and riddles uttered at the banquet. One famous riddle is preserved, although incompletely so, by a papyrus scrap and ancient quotations:

⌊αὐτὰρ ἐπεὶ δαιτὸς μὲν ἐίσης⌋ ἐξ ἔρον ἕντο
⌊μητέρα μητρὸς⌋ παισ]ὶν ἄγοντο
⌊ἀζαλέην τε καὶ ὀπταλέην σφετέροισι⌋ τέκεσσι
⌊τεθνάναι⌋

Translation:

then when they had put away their desire for equal banquet
] mother's mother [ ] they led [to the children,
dry and roasted to their own children
to die [

According to West, the "children" here are the flames whose mother would be wood. The "mother's mother" is the acorn, which is being roasted in the fire.

== Editions and translations ==
=== Critical editions ===
- Merkelbach, R.; West, M.L. (1967), Fragmenta Hesiodea, Oxford, ISBN 0-19-814171-8.
- Merkelbach, R.; West, M.L. (1990), "Fragmenta selecta", in F. Solmsen (ed.), Hesiodi Theogonia, Opera et Dies, Scutum (3rd rev. ed.), Oxford, ISBN 0-19-814071-1.

=== Translations ===
- Most, G.W. (2006), Hesiod: Theogony, Works and Days, Testimonia, Loeb Classical Library, vol. 57, Cambridge, MA, ISBN 978-0-674-99622-9.
- Most, G.W. (2007), Hesiod: The Shield, Catalogue, Other Fragments, Loeb Classical Library, vol. 503, Cambridge, MA, ISBN 978-0-674-99623-6.

== Bibliography ==
- Cingano, E. (2009), "The Hesiodic Corpus", in Montanari; Rengakos; Tsagalis (eds.), pp. 91–130.
- D'Alessio, G.B. (2005), "The Megalai Ehoiai: A Survey of the Fragments", in R. Hunter (ed.), The Hesiodic Catalogue of Women: Constructions and Reconstructions, Cambridge, pp. 176–216, ISBN 0-521-83684-0.
- Merkelbach, R.; West, M.L. (1965), "The Wedding of Ceyx" (PDF), Rheinisches Museum für Philologie, 108: 300–17.
- Montanari, F.; Rengakos, A.; Tsagalis, C. (2009), Brill's Companion to Hesiod, Leiden, ISBN 978-90-04-17840-3.
- Schwartz, J. (1960), Pseudo-Hesiodeia: recherches sur la composition, la diffusion et la disparition ancienne d'oeuvres attribuées à Hésiode, Leiden.
- West, M.L. (1961), "Hesiodea", The Classical Quarterly, 11 (3–4): 130–45, doi:10.1017/s0009838800015469, S2CID 246875859.
