= Salmoneus =

Greek mythological king

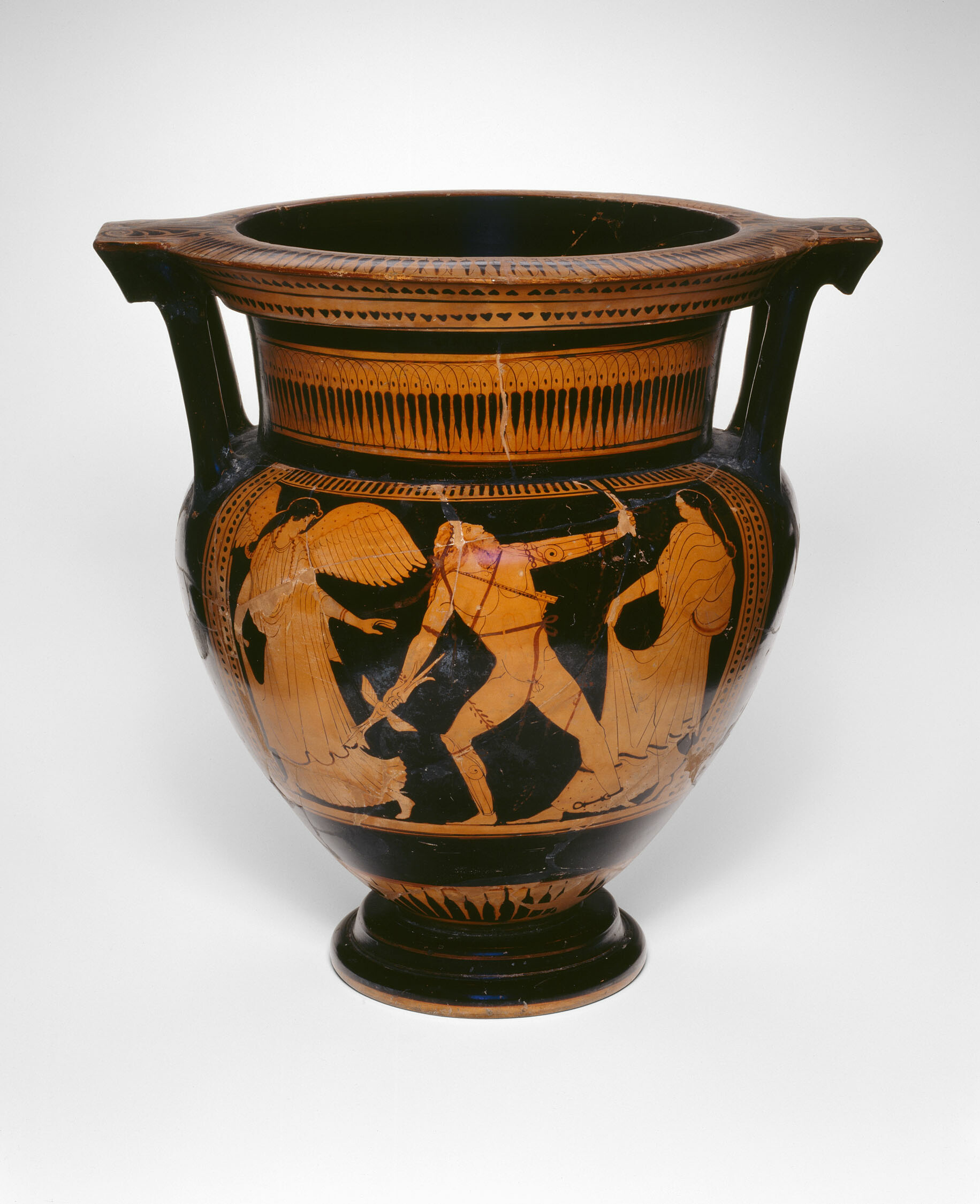
Red-figure vase, dating c.460 BCE, depicting the mythical King Salmoneus imitating Zeus.

In Greek mythology, Salmoneus (/səlˈmoʊniəs/; Ancient Greek: Σαλμωνεύς, romanized: Salmōneús) was 'the wicked' eponymous king and founder of Salmone in Pisatis.

== Family ==
Salmoneus was formerly a Thessalian prince as son of King Aeolus of Aeolia. His mother was identified as (1) Enarete, daughter of Deimachus, or (2) Iphis, daughter of Peneus, or (3) Laodice, daughter of Aloeus. Salmoneus was the brother of Athamas, Sisyphus, Cretheus, Perieres, Deioneus, Magnes, Calyce, Canace, Alcyone, Pisidice and Perimede.

Salmoneus's first wife was Alcidice by whom he became the father of Tyro, while his second wife was Sidero.

== Mythology ==
Emigrating from Aeolis with a number of Aeolians, Salmoneus founded a city in Eleia (Elis) on the banks of the river Alpheius and called it Salmonia after his own name. He then married Alcidice, the daughter of Aleus but when she died, the king took for a second wife Sidero who treated his beautiful daughter Tyro unkindly.

Salmoneus and his brother Sisyphus hated each other. Sisyphus found out from an oracle that if he married Tyro, she would bear him children who would kill Salmoneus. At first, Tyro submitted to Sisyphus, married him, and bore him a son. When Tyro found out what the child would do to Salmoneus, she killed the boy. It was soon after this that Tyro lay with Poseidon and bore him Pelias and Neleus.

Salmoneus, being an overbearing man and impious, came to be hated by his subjects for he ordered them to worship him under the name of Zeus. He built a bridge of brass, over which he drove at full speed in his chariot to imitate thunder, the effect being heightened by dried skins and cauldrons trailing behind while torches were thrown into the air to represent lightning. For this sin of hubris, Zeus eventually struck him down with his thunderbolt and destroyed the town.

And he [i.e. Salmoneus] acted profanely, by casting torches (in the air) as if they were lightnings,
And dragging dried hides with kettles at his chariot,
Pretending to make thunder, so he was thunderstruck by Zeus.

Virgil's Aeneid has Salmoneus placed in Tartarus after Zeus smites him where he is subjected to eternal torment.

== Inspiration ==
According to Frazer, the early Greek kings, who were expected to produce rain for the benefit of the crops, were in the habit of imitating thunder and lightning in the character of Zeus. At Crannon in Thessaly, there was a bronze chariot which in time of drought was shaken and prayers offered for rain. S. Reinach suggests that the story that Salmoneus was struck by lightning was due to the misinterpretation of a picture, in which a Thessalian magician appeared bringing down lightning and rain from heaven. Hence arose the idea that he was the victim of the anger or jealousy of Zeus and that the picture represented his punishment.

== See also ==
- List of Hercules (1998 TV series) episodes, season 1, episode 2
- List of Hercules: The Legendary Journeys and Xena: Warrior Princess characters
