= Perieres (king of Messenia) =

Mythological king of Messenia

In Greek mythology, Perieres (Ancient Greek: Περιήρης, romanized: Periēres, lit. 'one who is around or sits around', 'wandering about' or 'surrounding') was the 'overbold' king of Messene, an ancient polis in southern Peloponnese.

== Biography ==
Perieres's parentage and offspring vary across ancient authors. In most sources, however, he was a son of King Aeolus and Enarete, daughter of Deimachus. His siblings were Athamas, Cretheus, Deioneus, Magnes, Salmoneus, Sisyphus, Alycone, Calyce, Canace, Peisidice and Perimede.

In some accounts, Perieres was called the son of Dioplethes, son of King Myrmidon of Phthia and possibly Peisidice, daughter of Aeolus.

The Bibliotheca mentioned two different versions of Perieres's lineage or two distinct character named Perieres. In the first version, he could be a son of King Cynortas, the husband of Gorgophone, the famous daughter of Perseus, and the father of Tyndareus, Icarius, Aphareus and Leucippus. Meanwhile, in the second story, Perieres could be a son of Aeolus and father of only two sons by Gorgophone, Aphareus and Leucippus. In this case, Tyndareus and Icarius, along with Hippocoon and Arene, would be the children of Oebalus, son of Perieres, the son of Cynortas; their mother being the nymph Bateia. In addition, Polydora and Borus were also called his children.

According to Pausanias, Gorgophone, the daughter of Perseus, was one of the first women who married twice. She first married Perieres, king of Messene and son of Aeolus, and had by him sons Leucippus and Aphareus. After Perieres's death, she married Oebalus, king of Sparta and son of Cynortas, and had by him Tyndareus, Icarius and Arene. Pisus, son of Aphareus and founder of Pisa in Elis, in some versions of the myth, was one of Perieres's children.

The scholia on Apollonius Rhodius's Argonautica recounted that Perieres was the father of a certain Deidameia, who was the mother of Iphiclus, Althaea and Leda by King Thestius of Pleuron, the son of Ares and Demonice. According to Hesiod, Halirrhotius was also called the son of Perieres.

Comparative table of Perieres's family
Relation	Name	Sources										
Relation	Name	Homer		Hesiod	Isocrates	Apollon.	Apollodorus			Pausanias	Tzetzes	
Relation	Name	Iliad	Sch.	Cat.	Isocrates	Sch. Arg.	Apollodorus			Pausanias	Lycoph.	
Parents	Dioplethes		✓									
Parents	Aeolus			✓						✓	✓	
Parents	Aeolus and Enarete						✓					
Parents	Cynortas							✓				✓
Wife	Gorgophone				✓		✓			✓	✓	
Children	Borus	✓							✓			
Children	Halirrhothius			✓								
Children	Leucippus			✓			✓			✓	✓	
Children	Tyndareus				✓		✓				✓	
Children	Deidameia					✓						
Children	Aphareus						✓			✓	✓	
Children	Icarius						✓				✓	
Children	Oebalus							✓				
Children	Polydora								✓			
Children	Pisus									✓		
