= Perimede (mythology) =

Greek mythological figure

In Greek mythology, the name Perimede (/ˌpɛrɪˈmiːdi/; Ancient Greek: Περιμήδη, lit. 'very cunning' or 'cunning all round'') refers to:

- Perimede, in a rare account, the mother of Pelasgus by Phoroneus.
- Perimede, daughter of Oeneus, mother of Astypalaea and Europe by Phoenix (son of Agenor).
- Perimede, a Thessalian princess as the daughter of King Aeolus of Aeolia and Enarete, daughter of Deimachus. She was the sister of Salmoneus, Athamas, Sisyphus, Cretheus, Perieres, Deioneus, Magnes, Calyce, Canace, Alcyone and Pisidice. Perimede was the mother of Hippodamas and Orestes by the river god Achelous.
- Perimede, other name for Polymede, mother of Jason by Aeson.
- Perimede, a witch, expert in herbs and poisons, described as "fair-haired". See Agamede.
