= International Olympic Academy =

International Olympic Academy Διεθνησ Ολυμπιακη Ακαδημια
- Abbreviation: IOA
- Formation: June 14, 1961; 65 years ago
- Legal status: legal entity of private law, supervised by the Greek Ministry of Culture under the patronage of the IOC
- Headquarters: 52, Dimitrios Vikelas Avenue; 152 33 Halandri - Athens
- Website: www.ioa.org.gr

The International Olympic Academy (IOA) is the main educational and cultural institution for the International Olympic Committee. Established in 1961, the IOA is located in Ancient Pisa near the archeological site of ancient Olympia.

The goal of the IOA is to educate young people, college students, educators, Olympic athletes and sports journalists about the Olympic Ideals and show how to promote them in society.

== Facilities ==
The IOA is located near Ancient Olympia in the Peloponnese region of Greece. Its facility includes a 500-seat Auditorium, a 250-seat presentation room, five classrooms, a library with more than 16.000 book titles, a restaurant, accommodation rooms for one and two persons and dormitories for eight persons .

== History ==
The founder of the modern Olympic Games, Pierre de Coubertin, had expressed the need for an Olympic educations center: "I have not been able to carry out to the end what I wanted to achieve. I believe that a center of Olympic Studies would contribute, more than anything else, to the preservation and continuation of my work and would protect it from the deviations, which I am afraid will happen".

De Coubertin believed that institution would be responsible for the research, the philosophy and the principles of Olympism, the study of the means and methods for the realization and the application of its ideas in our continuously progressing contemporary world. He wanted an institution that would teach the Olympic principles and ideals to young people. Additionally, the center would educated staff on furthering the Olympic movement without deviating from the Olympic ideals and the aims as expressed by de Coubertin.

In 1938, Carl Diem, a leading figure in the German sports movement, and Ioannis Ketseas, Member of the IOC, proposed establishing this center in Greece. It would be based on the Institute of Olympic Studies in Berlin. However, the onset of World War II stopped any further action.

In 1949, the IOC approved Ketseas' proposal for the IOA. The IOA finally acquired its first legal personality as an HOC Commission in 1955. After approval by the General Assembly of the IOC, the IOA began its first Session in 1961.

In 2001, the IOA became a private legal entity, acquiring an operational autonomy, with the financial support of the Greek government and the IOC. Setting as its milestone the 2004 Olympic Games, the Academy adopted a different pace; opening the doors of its facilities to events with an Olympic objective, while still maintaining a conservative approach with respect to its true potential.

== National Olympic Academies ==
Under President Juan Antonio Samaranch, the IOC encouraged the foundation of National Olympic Academies (NOAs) around world to promote the cultural and educational development of the Olympic Movement.

Many people who had attended IOA session returned home and started spreading what they learned in Olympia. They organized meetings, published their impressions and delivered speeches on the subjects. These meetings and other activities became the foundations of the National Olympic Academies.

Otto Simitzek, Dean of the IOA for over 30 years, wrote in one of his articles some time ago: "I believe implicitly that the National Olympic Academies can and will accomplish a task of great import and consequence, especially so if they are in touch with the parent International Olympic Academy and they coordinate their activities accordingly".

== IOA programs ==
- In 1961, the IOA inaugurated its first program, the International Session for Young Participants, the only IOC Session by that time. It was hosted under tents. In later years, the program had 210 participants.
- In 1986, the "International Seminar for Sports Journalists" was first held.
- In 1987, the IOA started the "International Session for NOA Directors"
- In 1992, the "Joint International Session for Presidents or Directors of NOA's and Officials of NOC's" was started
- In 1993 the IOA started the "International Session for Educators and Officials of Higher Institutes of Physical Education" a;pmg with the "International Seminar on Olympic Studies for Postgraduate Students"
- In 2007, the "International Session for Olympic Medalists" was started

Over 80,000 people have attended the IOA sports and scientific Congresses and Seminars, including 20.000 participants in the official Sessions.

The IOA in cooperation with the University of Peloponnese and the sponsorship of the John Latsis Foundation organizes an International Postgraduate Program for Olympic Studies (Master's Degree Program) that lasts two years.
