= Pisa, Greece =

City-state of Greece, suppressed by Elis

Archaia Pisa Αρχαία Πίσα
- Community
- Location within Greece
- Coordinates: 37°38′38″N 21°39′14″E
- Country: Greece
- Administrative region: Western Greece
- Regional unit: Elis
- Municipality: Archaia Olympia
- Municipal unit: Archaia Olympia

Population (2021)
  - Community: 331
- Time zone: UTC+2 (EET)
  - Summer (DST): UTC+3 (EEST)

Ancient or Archaia Pisa (Greek: Αρχαία Πίσα, Archaía Písa), sometimes distinguished in Greek as Archaía Písa Ileías (Αρχαία Πίσα Ηλείας), is a modern village located 2.15 kilometers (1.34 mi) of Ancient or Archaia Olympia on the northwest corner of the Peloponnese in southern Greece. It is named for the city-state of Pisa (Ancient Greek: Πῖσα, Pîsa) in Ancient Greece, sometimes credited with colonizing Pisa, Italy. In antiquity, the cities of Pisa, Olympia, and Elis competed for supremacy of the region and management of its sacred precinct. Eventually Olympia was victorious in the contention and Pisa became part of Olympia rather than vice versa. The modern village is now organized as part of Ancient Olympia's municipality in the regional unit of Elis. It is the home of the International Olympic Academy.

== Legendary foundations ==
The Pisa of antiquity is now thought to have been at a slightly different location about 1 kilometer (0.62 mi) east of Olympia. Pisa was said to have been founded by an eponymous hero, Pisus, the son of Perieres, and grandson of Aeolus; but others derived its name from a fountain Pisa. Modern writers connect its name with Πῖσος, a low marshy ground, or with Πίσσα, the name of the black fir or pinetree. It was celebrated in mythology as the residence of Oenomaus and Pelops. The Virgilian commentator Servius wrote that the Teuti, or Pelops, the king of the Pisatans, arrived on the Tyrrhenian coast after the Trojan War and founded the Italian (and now more famous) Pisa in the 13th century BC. These traditions are regarded as having no merit of historical truth today, but are classed as folk-etymologies.

== Pisatis ==
The existence of an ancient district called Pisatis (ἡ Πισᾶτις, hē Pisâtis), which included 8 villages over half of modern Elis, is indicated by many ancient authors. Such a political unit is certain for the 4th century BC. A confederacy of eight states apparently existed in Pisatis, of which, besides Pisa, the following names are recorded: Salmone, Heracleia, Harpinna, Cycesium, and Dyspontium. The celebration of the festival of Zeus at Olympia had originally belonged to the Pisatans, in the neighbourhood of whose city Olympia was situated.

== Early Olympic Games ==
In the eighth Olympiad (747 BC) the Pisatans succeeded in depriving the Eleians of the presidency by calling in the assistance of Pheidon I, king of Argos, in conjunction with whom they celebrated the festival. But almost immediately afterwards the power of Pheidon was destroyed by the Spartans, who not only restored to the Eleians the presidency, but are said even to have confirmed them in the possession of the Pisatis and Triphylia.

In the Second Messenian War the Pisatans and Triphylians revolted from Elis and assisted the Messenians, while the Eleians sided with the Spartans. In this war the Pisatans were commanded by their king Pantaleon, who also succeeded in making himself master of Olympia by force, during the 34th Olympiad (644 BC), and in celebrating the games to the exclusion of the Eleians. The conquest of the Messenians by the Spartans must also have been attended by the submission of the Pisatans to their former masters.

In the 48th Olympiad (588 BC) the Eleians, suspecting the fidelity of Damophon, the son of Pantaleon, invaded the Pisatis, but were persuaded by Damophon to return home without committing any further acts of hostility. But in the 52nd Olympiad (572 BC), Pyrrhus, who had succeeded his brother Damophon in the sovereignty of Pisa, invaded Elis, assisted by the Dyspontii in the Pisatis, and by the Macistii and Scilluntii in Triphylia. This attempt ended in the ruin of these towns, which were razed to the ground by the Eleians.

From this time the Pisa of antiquity disappeared from history. So complete was its destruction that the fact of its ever having existed was disputed in later times. Although Pisa ceased to exist as a city, the Pisatans, in conjunction with the Arcadians, celebrated the 104th Olympic festival in 364 BC.

== Later history ==
Pausanias found its site converted into a vineyard. Its situation, however, was perfectly well known to Pindar and Herodotus. Pindar frequently identifies it with Olympia; and Herodotus refers to Pisa and Olympia as the same point in computing the distance from the altar of the twelve gods at Athens.

In the early modern period, many maps of Greece—including Rigas Feraios's influential 1797 "Map of Greece"—labeled the rough area of ancient Olympia as "Olympia Pisa" (Ολυμπία Πίσα) or "Pissa" (Πίσσα). The modern settlement of Ancient Pisa was a village known as Moiráka (Μοιράκα) under Turkish rule. This name was emended to Miráka (Μιράκα) in 1940 and then changed to Ancient Pisa in 1997. The present village includes the International Olympic Academy.

== See also ==
- Hippodamia of Pisa
- Tantalus (son of Broteas)
- List of ancient Greek cities
