= Pheidon I =

- King of Argos
- Reign: 8th century BC
- Predecessor: Temenus
- Successor: Deiphontes
- Born: Unknown
- Died: Unknown; Argos
- Father: Temenus

Pheidon I (Greek: Φείδων'A) was a king of Argos in the 8th century BC, and seems to have been a son of Temenus, a great-great-grandson of Heracles. He is often confused with another king of Argos also named Pheidon, who was probably one of his descendants.

== Biography ==
He ascended the throne after defeating his brothers, most notably the future ancestor of Alexander the Great, Caranus of Macedon who after being defeated, left to found his own kingdom, in what is now known as Macedon.

This is perhaps the Pheidon that assisted the Pisatans to expel the Eleian superintendents of the Olympian Games and presided at the festival himself. The Eleians, however, refused to recognize the Olympiad or to include it in the register, and shortly afterwards, with the aid of the Spartans, who are said to have looked upon Pheidon as having ousted them from the headship of Greece, defeated Pheidon and were reinstated in the possession of Pisatis and their former privileges.

The affair of the games has an important bearing on his date. Pausanias (vi. 22, 2) definitely states that Pheidon presided at the festival in the 8th Olympiad (i.e. in 748 BC)

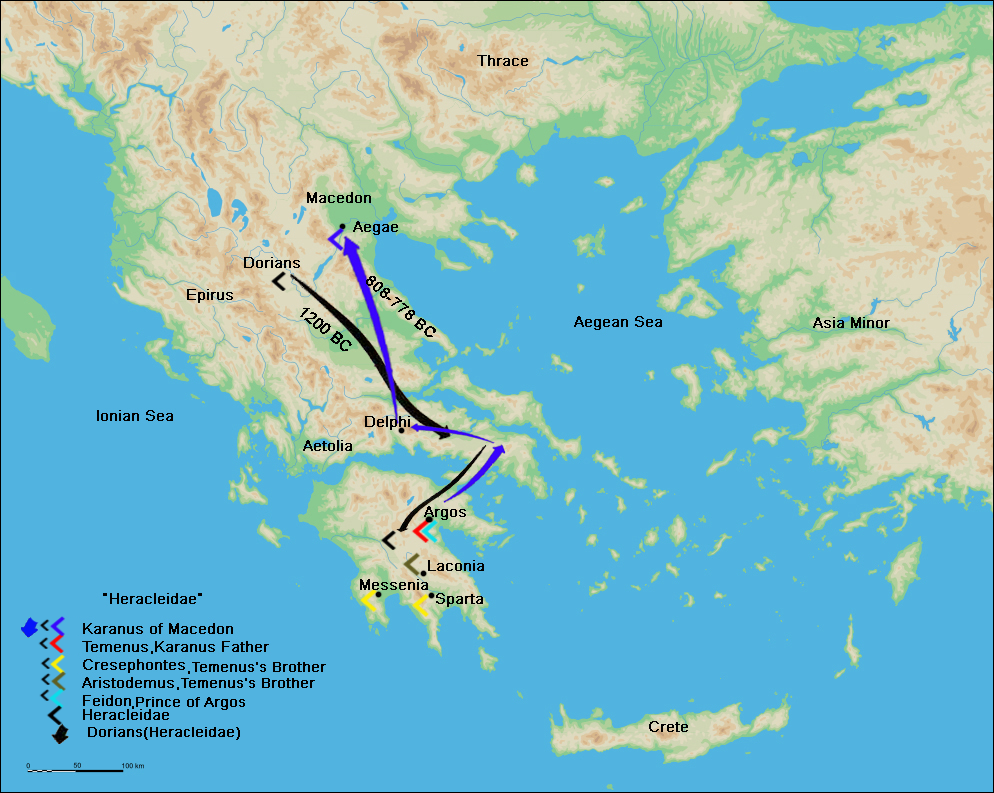
Dominions of the Heracleidae, Pheidon's highlighted in light blue.
