= Macistus =

In Greek mythology, Macistus or Makistos (Ancient Greek: Μάκιστος means 'tallest' or 'greatest) may refer to the following person and surname:

- Macistus, a Boeotian prince as the son of King Athamas probably by the cloud-nymph Nephele, thus the brother of Phrixus and Helle. From Macistus, the town of Macistus in Triphylia was believed to have derived its name.
- Makistios, an epithet of Heracles, who had a temple in the neighbourhood of the town of Macistus in Triphylia, Elis (Peloponnese).
- Makistios as an epithet of Heracles was behind the cinematic character of Maciste, popular in Italian sword and sandals films. In English translations, the name was often replaced by the more familiar ones of Hercules and Atlas.

== See also ==
- Mecisteus
