= Salmone (Elis) =

Coordinates: 37°41′47″N 21°34′12″E

Salmone (Ancient Greek: Σαλμώνη) was a town of ancient Elis. Strabo indicates that its name derives from a king of Greek mythology called Salmoneus and he locates it in Pisatis, of which it was one of its eight towns, near Heraclea, next to a fountain that bore the same name and that was where the Enipeus (the modern Lestinitsa) flowed. It was on the road between Olympia and Elis, and although its exact location is not known for sure it was supposed to be north of the current village of Karatula, at the source of the Lestinitsa.
