= Sisyphus =

King of Ephyra in Greek mythology

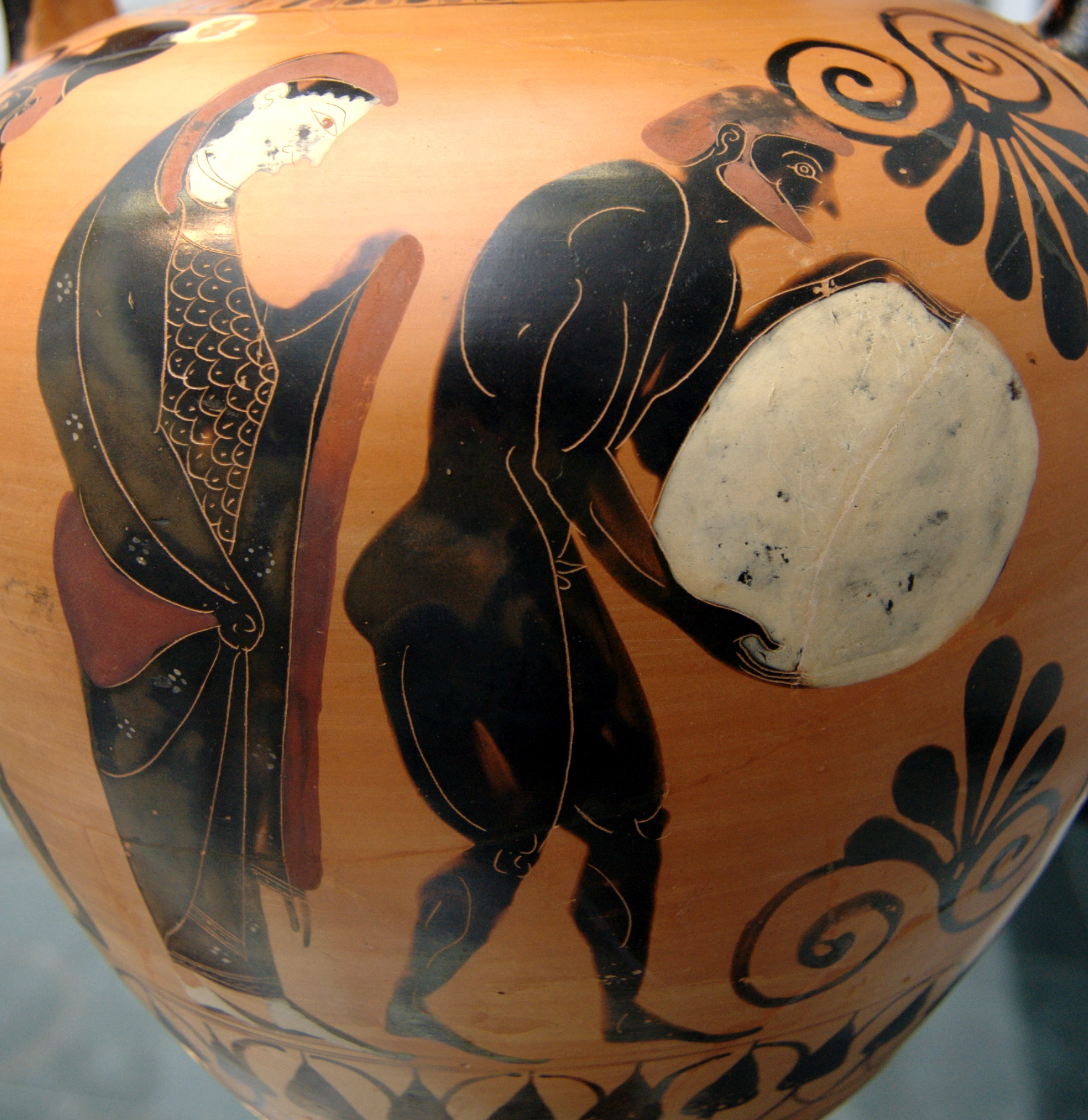
Persephone supervising Sisyphus in the Underworld, Attic black-figure amphora, c. 530 BC, Staatliche Antikensammlungen

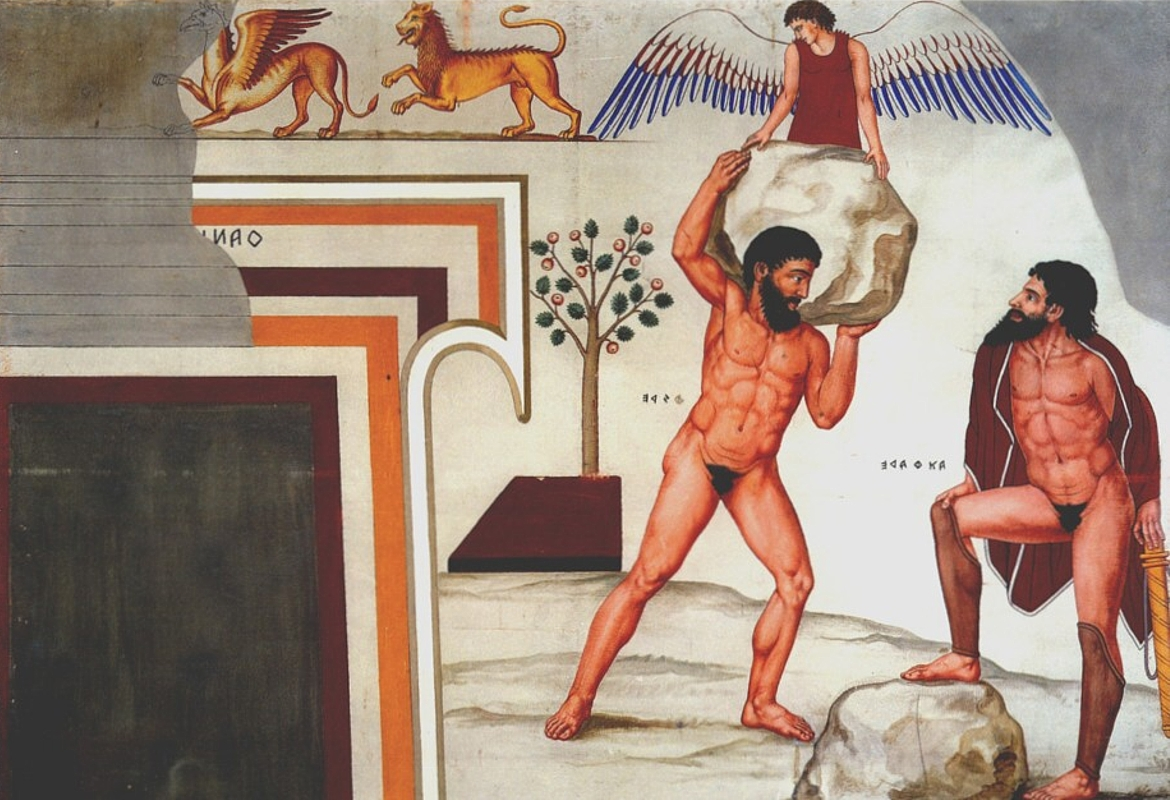
Sisyphus and Amphiaraus, copy of a mural in the François Tomb, Vulci, made in 4th century BC

In Greek mythology, Sisyphus or Sisyphos (/ˈsɪsəfəs/; Ancient Greek: Σίσυφος, romanized: Sísyphos) is the founder and king of Ephyra (now known as Corinth). He reveals Zeus's abduction of Aegina to the river god Asopus, thereby incurring Zeus's wrath. His subsequent cheating of death earns him eternal punishment in the underworld, once he dies of old age. The gods condemned him to push an immense boulder up a hill only for it to roll back down every time it neared the top, repeating this action for eternity. Through the classical influence on contemporary culture, tasks that are laborious, futile, and never-ending are therefore often described as Sisyphean. (/sɪsəˈfiːən/).

== Etymology ==
R. S. P. Beekes has suggested a pre-Greek origin and a connection with the root of the word sophos (σοφός, "wise"). German mythographer Otto Gruppe thought that the name derived from sisys (σίσυς, "a goat's skin"), in reference to a rain-charm in which goats' skins were used.

== Family ==
Sisyphus was formerly a Thessalian prince as the son of King Aeolus of Aeolia and Enarete, daughter of Deimachus. He was the brother of Athamas, Salmoneus, Cretheus, Perieres, Deioneus, Magnes, Calyce, Canace, Alcyone, Pisidice and Perimede.

Sisyphus married the Pleiad Merope by whom he became the father of Ornytion (Porphyrion), Glaucus, Thersander and Almus. He was the grandfather of Bellerophon through Glaucus; and of Minyas, founder of Orchomenus, through Almus. Another account related that Minyas was Sisyphus's son instead.

In other versions of the myth, Sisyphus was the true father of Odysseus by Anticleia instead of Laërtes.

== Mythology ==
=== Reign ===
Sisyphus was the founder and first king of Ephyra (supposedly the original name of Corinth). While king, according to Pausanias, he founded the Isthmian Games in honor of Melicertes, whose dead body was brought to shore on the Isthmus of Corinth by a dolphin. In a fragment of Pindar, he instead founds the Games (in honour of Melicertes) upon the instructions of a group of nymphs. While Sisyphus was supposed to make Ancient Corinth a travel hub and invested in navigation, he infuriated Zeus by killing all guests to his palace in violation of the xenia so that he can prove that he is a ruthless king.

=== Conflict with Salmoneus ===
Sisyphus and his brother Salmoneus were known to hate each other, and Sisyphus consulted the Oracle of Delphi on just how to kill Salmoneus without incurring any severe consequences for himself. From Homer onward, Sisyphus was famed as the craftiest of men. He seduced Salmoneus's daughter Tyro in one of his plots to kill Salmoneus, only for Tyro to slay their children when she discovered that Sisyphus was planning on using them to eventually dethrone her father.

=== Cheating death twice ===
Sisyphus betrayed one of Zeus's secrets by revealing the whereabouts of the Asopid Aegina to her father, the river god Asopus, in return for creating an Eternal spring to flow on the Corinthian acropolis.

Zeus ordered Thanatos to chain Sisyphus in Tartarus. But Sisyphus sensed him coming, and seized the opportunity to trap Thanatos himself in chains instead. Once Thanatos was bound by the strong chains, no one died on Earth, causing an uproar. Ares, the god of war, perhaps annoyed that his battles had become less diverting because his opponents would not die, intervened and freed Thanatos, enabling deaths to happen again, and turned Sisyphus over to him.

In some versions Hades was sent to chain Sisyphus and was chained himself. As long as Hades was trapped, nobody could die. Consequently, sacrifices could not be made to the gods, and those that were old and sick were suffering. The gods finally threatened to make life so miserable for Sisyphus that he would wish he were dead. He then had no choice but to release Hades.

Before dying, Sisyphus instructed his wife Merope not to perform the customary funeral rites for him. When he reached the underworld, he complained to Hades (or, in some accounts, to Persephone) that his wife was neglecting him, and obtained permission to return to the upper world in order to reproach her.

Once back in Corinth, Sisyphus did not return to the underworld, and lived until he died of old age. In a later tradition, reported by Eustathius, Hermes forcibly carried him back down.

In another version of the myth, Persephone was tricked by Sisyphus that he had been conducted to Tartarus by mistake, and so she ordered that he be released.

In Philoctetes by Sophocles, there is a reference to the father of Odysseus (rumoured to have been Sisyphus, and not Laërtes, whom we know as the father in the Odyssey) upon having returned from the dead. Euripides, in Cyclops, also identified Sisyphus as Odysseus's father.

=== Punishment in the underworld ===
As a punishment for his crimes, Hades made Sisyphus roll a huge boulder endlessly up a steep hill in Tartarus. The maddening nature of the punishment was reserved for Sisyphus due to his hubristic belief that his cleverness surpassed that of Zeus himself. Hades accordingly displayed his own cleverness by enchanting the boulder into rolling away from Sisyphus before he reached the top which ended up consigning Sisyphus to an eternity of useless efforts and unending frustration. Thus, pointless or interminable activities are sometimes described as "Sisyphean". Sisyphus was a common subject for ancient writers and was depicted by the painter Polygnotus on the walls of the Lesche at Delphi.

== Interpretations ==
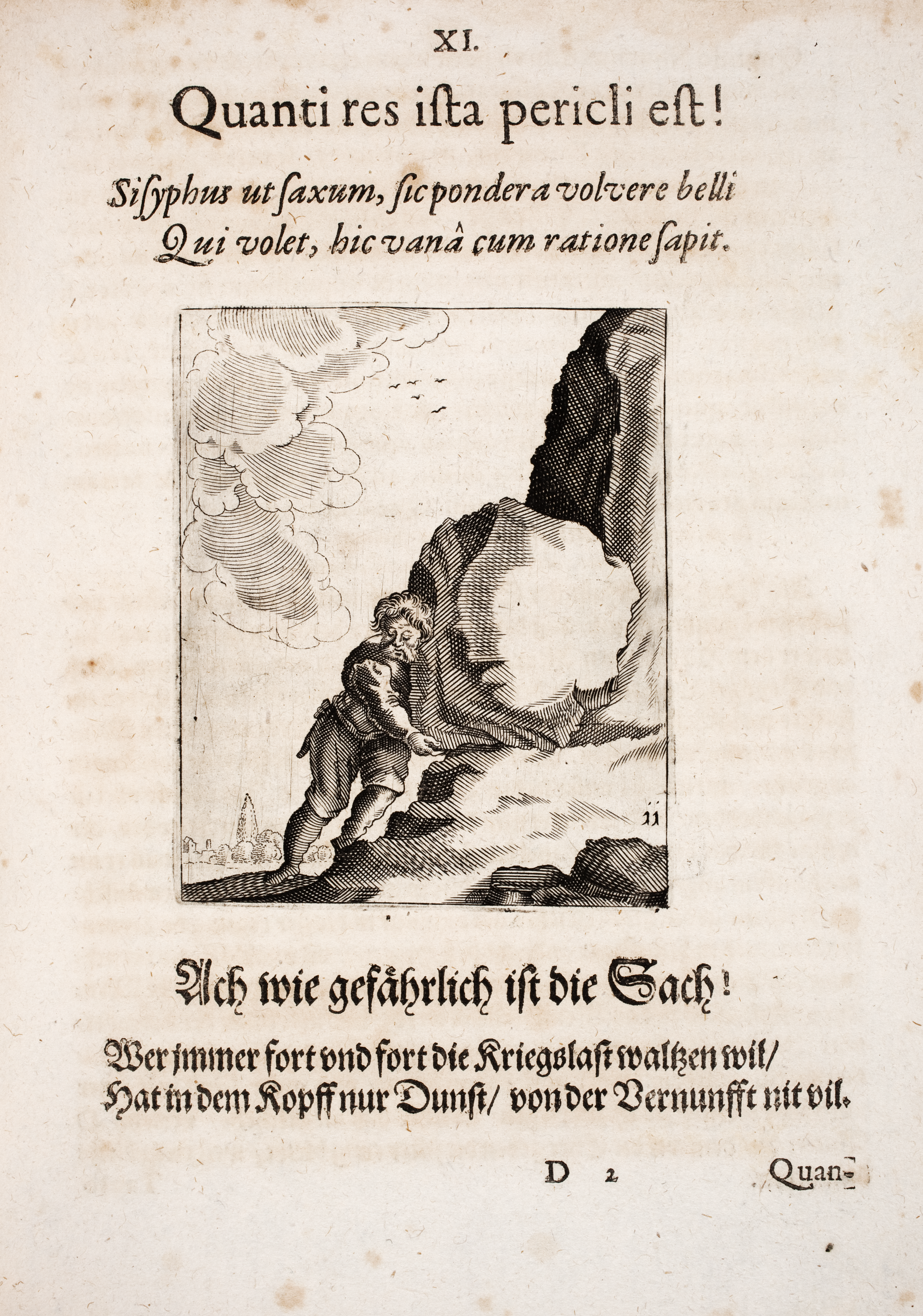
Sisyphus as a symbol for continuing a senseless war. Johann Vogel: Meditationes emblematicae de restaurata pace Germaniae, 1649

According to the solar theory, King Sisyphus is the disk of the sun that rises every day in the east and then sinks into the west. Other scholars regard him as a personification of waves rising and falling, or of the treacherous sea. The 1st-century BC Epicurean philosopher Lucretius interprets the myth of Sisyphus as personifying politicians aspiring for political office who are constantly defeated, with the quest for power, in itself an "empty thing", being likened to rolling the boulder up the hill. Friedrich Welcker suggested that he symbolises the vain struggle of man in the pursuit of knowledge, and Salomon Reinach that his punishment is based on a picture in which Sisyphus was represented rolling a huge stone Acrocorinthus, symbolic of the labour and skill involved in the building of the Sisypheum. Albert Camus, in his 1942 essay The Myth of Sisyphus, saw Sisyphus as personifying the absurdity of human life, but Camus concludes "one must imagine Sisyphus happy" as "The struggle itself towards the heights is enough to fill a man's heart." In his 1994 The Body of Myth, J. Nigro Sansonese, building on the work of Georges Dumézil, speculates that the origin of the name "Sisyphus" is onomatopoetic of the continual back-and-forth, susurrant sound ("siss phuss") made by the breath in the nasal passages, situating the mythology of Sisyphus in a far larger context of archaic (see Proto-Indo-European religion) trance-inducing techniques related to breath control. The repetitive inhalation–exhalation cycle is described esoterically in the myth as an up–down motion of Sisyphus and his boulder on a hill.

In experiments that test how workers respond when the meaning of their task is diminished, the test condition is referred to as the Sisyphusian condition. The two main conclusions of the experiment are that people work harder when their work seems more meaningful, and that people underestimate the relationship between meaning and motivation.

=== Literary interpretations ===
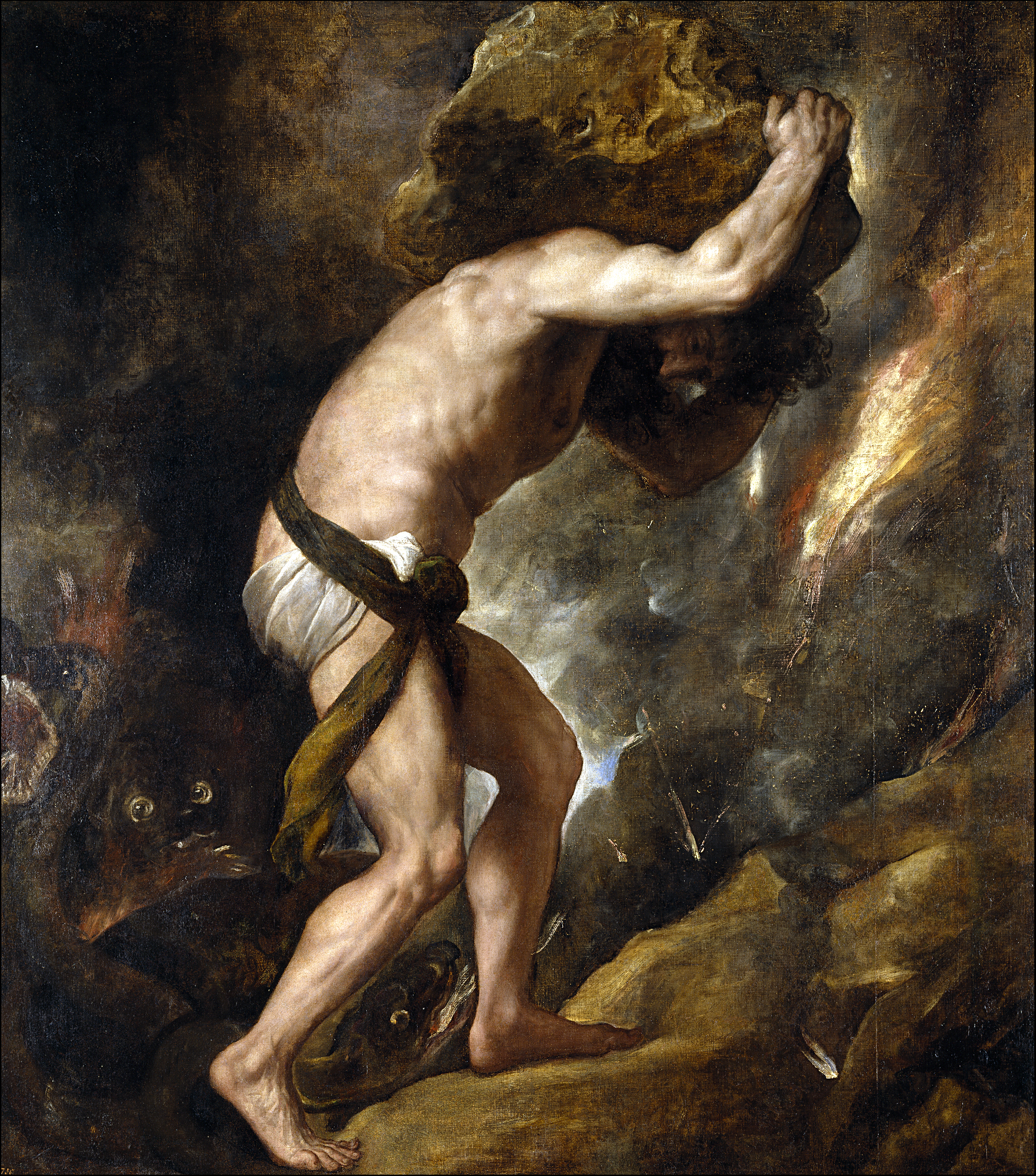
Sisyphus (1548–49) by Titian, Prado Museum, Madrid, Spain

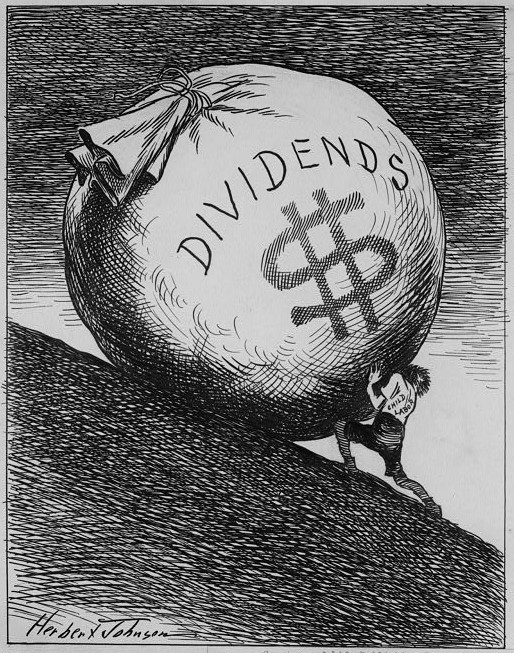
A caricature inspired by the myth of Sisyphus to denounce child labor in capitalism, c. 1913

- Homer describes Sisyphus in both Book VI of the Iliad and Book XI of the Odyssey.
- Ovid, the Roman poet, makes reference to Sisyphus in the story of Orpheus and Eurydice. When Orpheus descends and confronts Hades and Persephone, he sings a song so that they will grant his wish to bring Eurydice back from the dead. After this song is sung, Ovid shows how moving it was by noting that Sisyphus, emotionally affected for just a moment, stops his eternal task and sits on his rock, the Latin wording being inque tuo sedisti, Sisyphe, saxo ("and you sat, Sisyphus, on your rock").
- In Plato's Apology, Socrates looks forward to the after-life where he can meet figures such as Sisyphus, who think themselves wise, so that he can question them and find who is wise and who "thinks he is when he is not."
- Albert Camus, the French absurdist, wrote an essay entitled The Myth of Sisyphus, in which he elevates Sisyphus to the status of absurd hero.
- Franz Kafka repeatedly referred to Sisyphus as a bachelor; Kafkaesque for him were those qualities that brought out the Sisyphus-like qualities in himself. According to Frederick Karl: "The man who struggled to reach the heights only to be thrown down to the depths embodied all of Kafka's aspirations; and he remained himself, alone, solitary."
- The philosopher Richard Clyde Taylor uses the myth of Sisyphus as a representation of a life made meaningless because it consists of bare repetition.
- Wolfgang Mieder has collected cartoons that build on the image of Sisyphus, many of them editorial cartoons.
- Hollis Robbins, reading Ovid against Camus, proposes that the punishment was not a punishment but a recognition and making legible of Sisyphus's essential nature: his compulsion to push against the rules.

== See also ==
- Naranath Bhranthan, a willing boulder pusher in Indian folklore
- Jan Tregeagle, a Cornish magistrate who must empty Dozmary Pool with a limpet shell or weave sand into rope at Gwenor Cove
- Tantalus, who was similarly punished with a neverending toil
- Wu Gang – also tasked with the impossible: to fell a self-regenerating tree on the Moon
- Absurdism – philosophical theory that that states the universe is irrational and that people that try to find meaning are analogous to Sisyphus's punishment by Hades
