= Alcyone and Ceyx =

Ancient Greek mythological figures

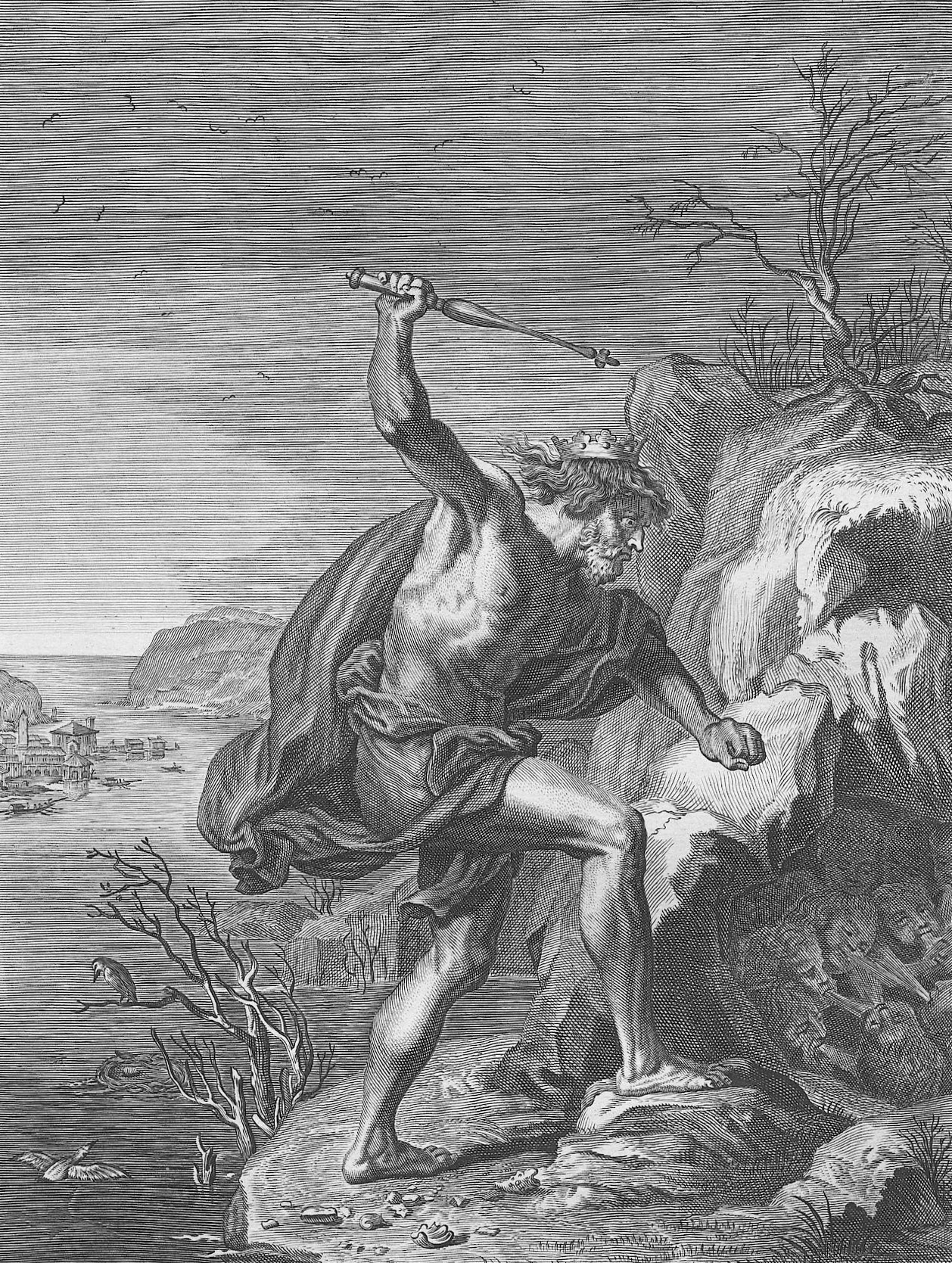
Alcyone and Ceyx Transformed into Halcyons

In Greek mythology, Alcyone (or dubiously Halcyone) (/ælˈsaɪəˌni, hælˈsaɪəˌni/; Ancient Greek: Ἀλκυόνη, romanized: Alkyónē, derived from ἀλκυών alkyón, "kingfisher") and Ceyx (/ˈsiːɪks/; Ancient Greek: Κήυξ, romanized: Kḗux) were a wife and husband who incurred the wrath of the god Zeus for their romantic hubris.

== Mythology ==
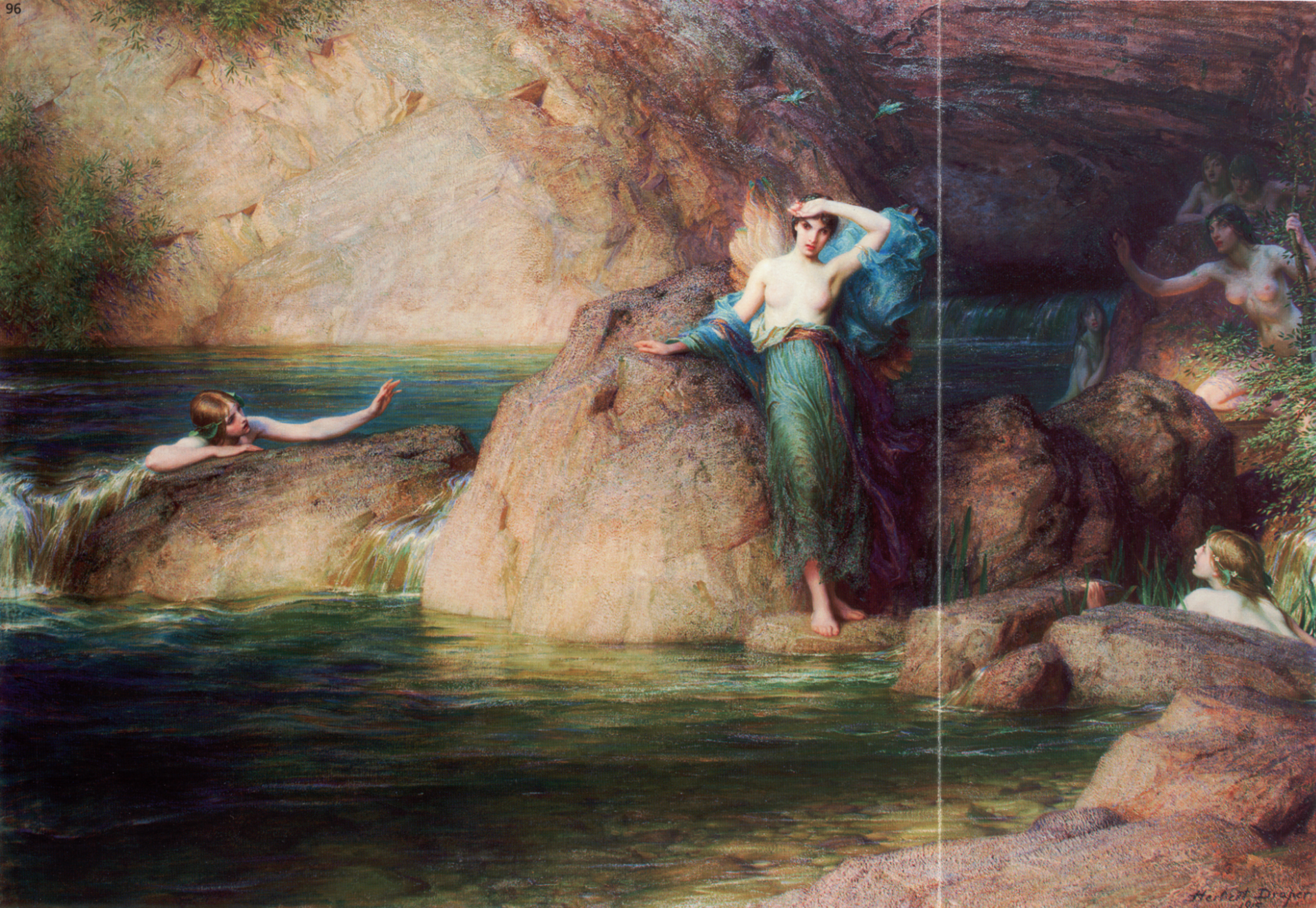
Herbert James Draper, Halcyone, 1915.

Alcyone was a Thessalian princess, the daughter of King Aeolus of Aeolia, either by Enarete or Aegiale. She was the sister of Salmoneus, Athamas, Sisyphus, Cretheus, Perieres, Deioneus, Magnes, Calyce, Canace, Pisidice and Perimede.

Later on, Alcyone became the queen of Trachis after marrying King Ceyx. The latter was the son of Eosphorus (often translated as Lucifer). The couple were very happy together in Trachis.

According to Pseudo-Apollodorus's account, this couple often sacrilegiously called each other "Zeus" and "Hera". This angered Zeus, so while Ceyx was at sea (in order to consult an oracle, according to Ovid), he killed Ceyx with a thunderbolt. Soon after, Morpheus, the god of dreams, disguised as Ceyx, appeared to Alcyone to tell her of her husband's fate. In her grief she threw herself into the sea. Out of compassion, the gods changed them both into "halcyon birds" (common kingfishers), named after her. Apollodorus says that Ceyx was turned into a gannet, and not a kingfisher.

Ovid and Hyginus both also recount the metamorphosis of the pair in and after Ceyx's loss in a terrible storm, though they both omit Ceyx and Alcyone calling each other "Zeus" and "Hera" (and Zeus's resulting anger) as a reason for it. On the contrary, it is mentioned that while still unaware of Ceyx's death in the shipwreck, Alcyone continued to pray at the altar of Hera for his safe return. Ovid also adds the detail of her seeing his body washed ashore before her attempted suicide. Pseudo-Probus, a scholiast on Virgil's Georgics, notes that Ovid followed Nicander's version of the tale, instead of Theodorus's starring another Alcyone. Virgil in the Georgics also alludes to the myth—again without reference to Zeus's anger.

It is possible that the earlier myth was a simpler version of the one by Nicander, where a woman named Alcyone mourned her unnamed husband; Ceyx was probably added later due to him being an important figure in mythology and poetry, and also having a wife whose name was Alcyone (as evidenced from the Hesiodic poem Wedding of Ceyx, which was probably about a different Ceyx).

== Etymology ==
Alkyóne comes from alkyón (ἀλκυών), which refers to a sea-bird with a mournful song or to a kingfisher bird in particular. The meaning(s) of the words is uncertain because alkyón is considered to be of pre-Greek, non-Indo-European origin. However, folk etymology related them to the háls (ἅλς, "brine, sea, salt") and kyéo (κυέω, "I conceive"). Alkyóne originally is written with a smooth breathing mark, but this false etymology beginning with a rough breathing mark (transliterated as the letter H) led to the common misspellings halkyón (ἁλκυών) and Halkyóne (Ἁλκυόνη), and thus the name of one of the kingfisher bird genera in English, Halcyon. It is also speculated that Alkyóne is derived from alké (ἀλκή, "prowess, battle, guard") and onéo (ὀνέω, from ὀνίνημι, onínēmi, "to help, to please").

Kéyx as referring to a sea-bird appears to be related to kaúax (καύαξ), which is a ravenous sea-bird (λάρος, láros). These suggest that Kéyx may have been turned into either a sea mew or a tern.

== Halcyon days ==
Ovid and Hyginus both also make the metamorphosis the origin of the term "halcyon days", the seven days in winter when storms never occur. They state that these were originally the fourteen days each year (seven days on either side of the shortest day of the year) during which Alcyone (as a kingfisher) made her nest on the beach and laid her eggs while her father Aeolus, the god of the winds, helped her do so safely by restraining the winds and thus calming the waves. The phrase has since come to refer to any peaceful time. Its proper meaning, however, is that of a lucky break, or a bright interval set in the midst of adversity; just as the days of calm and mild weather are set in the height of winter for the sake of the kingfishers' egglaying according to the myth. Kingfishers however do not live by the sea, so Ovid's tale is not based on any actual observations of the species and in fact refers to a mythical bird only later identified with the kingfisher.

The expression ἀλκῠονίδες ἡμέραι (alkuonídes hēmérai) first occurs in Aristophanes' play The Birds 1594, then again in Aristotle, Philochorus, and Lucian. In Latin it occurs as alcyonides dies in Pliny the Elder, alcyonei (-nĭī) diēs in Columella and Varro, alcyonia in Hyginus, and alcedonia in Plautus and Frontinus.

== Legacy ==
- Various kinds of kingfishers are named after the couple, in reference to the metamorphosis myth:
  - The genus Ceyx (within the river kingfishers family) is named after him.
  - The kingfisher family Halcyonidae (tree kingfishers) is named after Alcyone, as is the genus Halcyon.
  - The belted kingfisher's Latin species name (Megaceryle alcyon) also references her name.
- The seagoing high-crested pterosaur species Alcione elainus of the Late Cretaceous is named for Alcyone.
- Their story features in The Book of the Duchess.
- Their story is the basis for the opera Alcyone by the French composer Marin Marais and the cantata Alcyone by Maurice Ravel
- A collection of Canada's celebrated nature poet, Archibald Lampman, Alcyone, his final set of poetry published posthumously in 1899, highlights both Lampman's apocalyptic and utopian visions of the future.
- T. S. Eliot draws from this myth in part of his poem The Dry Salvages:
  And the ragged rock in the restless waters,
  Waves wash over it, fogs conceal it;
  On a halcyon day it is merely a monument,
  In navigable weather it is always a seamark
  To lay a course by: but in the sombre season
  Or the sudden fury, is what it always was.

== Gallery ==
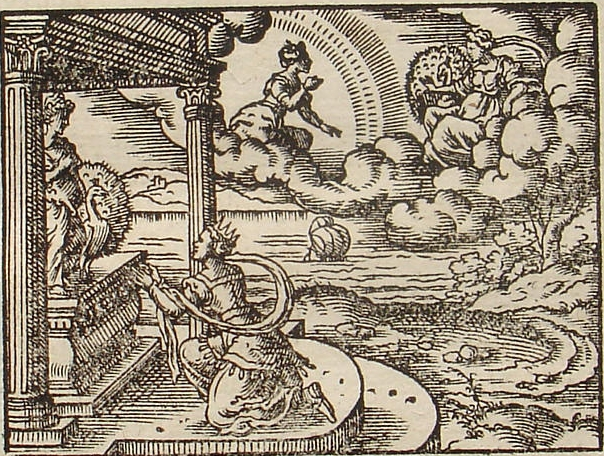
Alcyone praying Juno, engraving by Virgil Solis for Ovid's Metamorphoses Book XI, 573–582

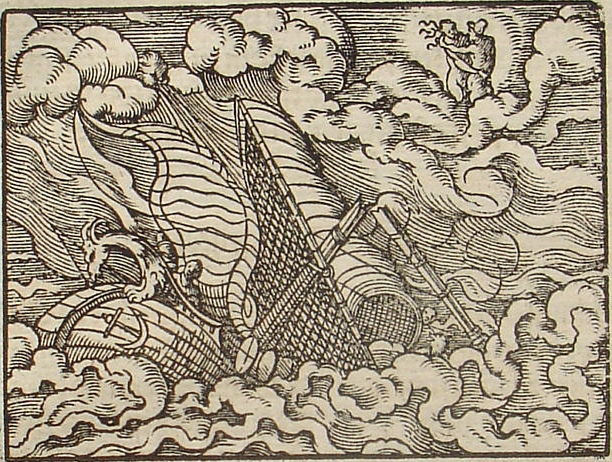
Ceyx in the tempest, engraving by Virgil Solis for Ovid's Metamorphoses Book XI, 410–572

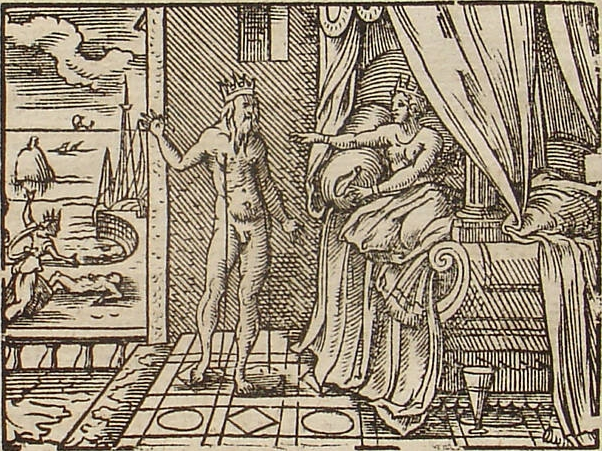
Ceyx/Morpheus appears to Alcyone, engraving by Virgil Solis for Ovid's Metamorphoses Book XI, 650–749.

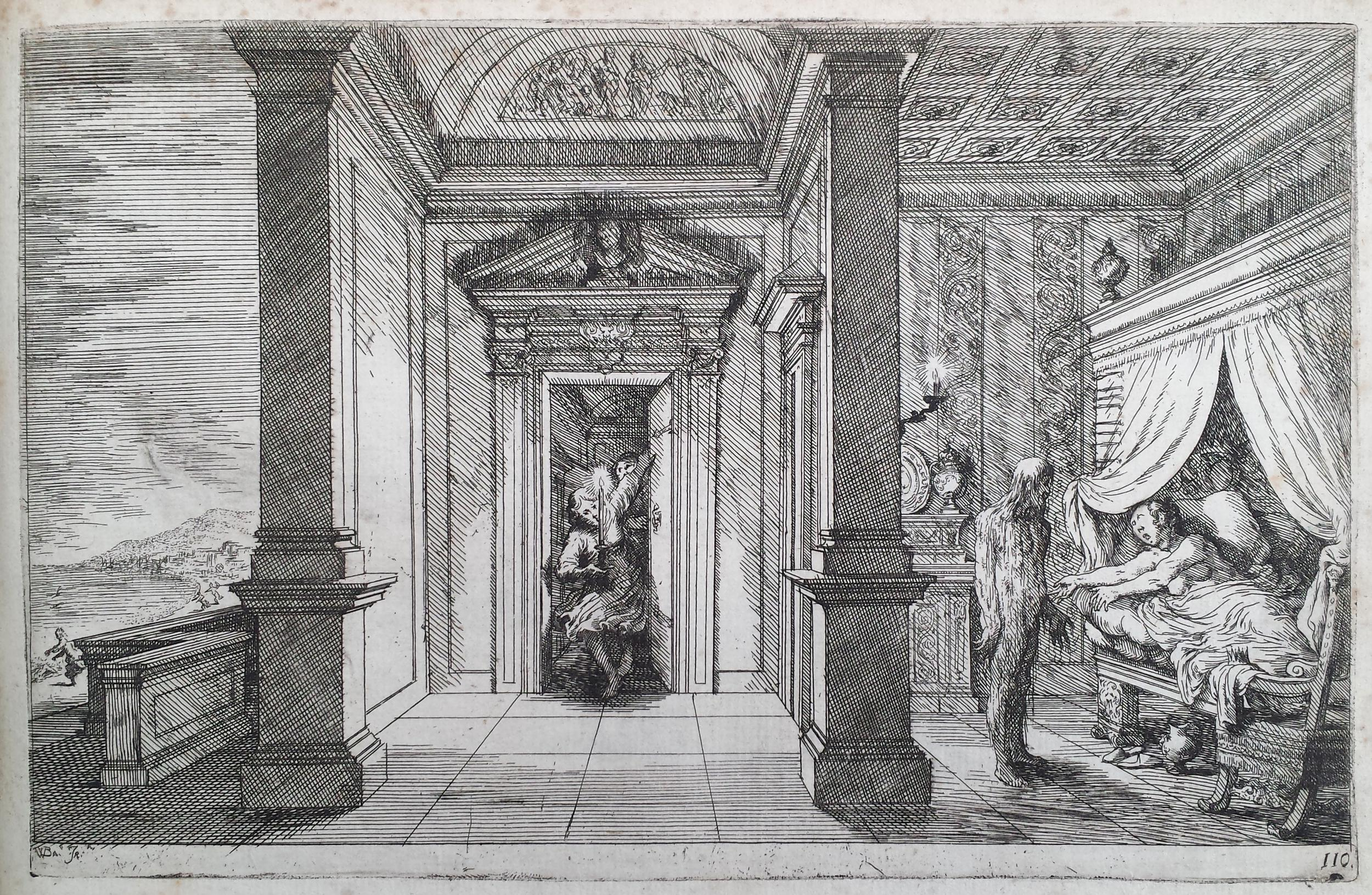
Ceyx/Morpheus appears to Alcyone, engraving (or etching more likely) by Bauer for Ovid's Metamorphoses Book XI, 633–676.

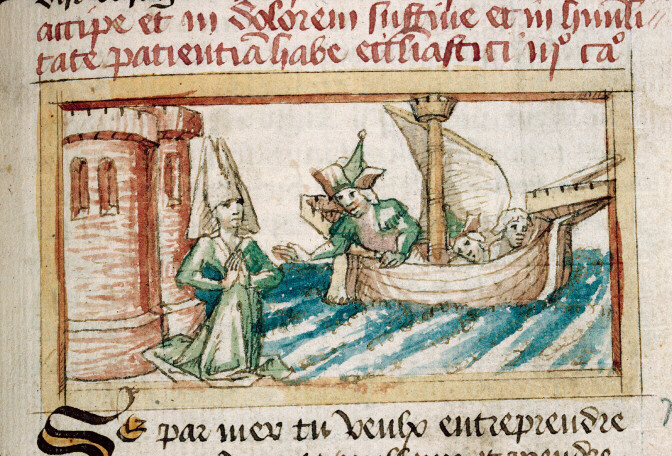
Ceyx prenant congé d'Alcyone (15th century)

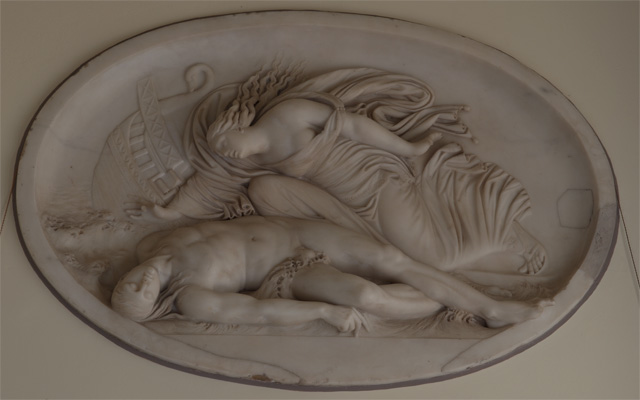
Alcyone and Ceyx marble bas relief, originally at Parlington Hall, Aberford, removed to Lotherton Hall sometime after 1905.

== See also ==
- Halcyon (dialogue)

== General and cited references ==
- Hesiod, Catalogue of Women from Homeric Hymns, Epic Cycle, Homerica translated by Evelyn-White, H G. Loeb Classical Library Volume 57. London: William Heinemann, 1914. Online version at theoi.com
- Hyginus, Fabulae from The Myths of Hyginus translated and edited by Mary Grant. University of Kansas Publications in Humanistic Studies. Online version at the Topos Text Project.
- Pausanias, Graeciae Descriptio. 3 vols. Leipzig, Teubner. 1903. Greek text available at the Perseus Digital Library.
- Pseudo-Apollodorus, The Library with an English Translation by Sir James George Frazer, F.B.A., F.R.S. in 2 Volumes, Cambridge, MA, Harvard University Press; London, William Heinemann Ltd. 1921. Online version at the Perseus Digital Library. Greek text available from the same website.
- Publius Ovidius Naso, Metamorphoses translated by Brookes More (1859-1942). Boston, Cornhill Publishing Co. 1922. Online version at the Perseus Digital Library.
- Publius Ovidius Naso, Metamorphoses. Hugo Magnus. Gotha (Germany). Friedr. Andr. Perthes. 1892. Latin text available at the Perseus Digital Library.
- Publius Vergilius Maro, Bucolics, Aeneid, and Georgics of Vergil. J. B. Greenough. Boston. Ginn & Co. 1900. Online version at the Perseus Digital Library.
