= Calyce (mythology) =

Greek mythological figures with same name

In Greek mythology, Calyce (Ancient Greek: Καλύκη, romanized: Kalyke) or Calycia is the name of several characters.

- Calyce, one of the Nysiads, the nymphs who nursed Dionysus.
- Calyce, a Thessalian princess as the daughter of King Aeolus of Aeolia and Enarete, daughter of Deimachus. She was the sister of Athamas, Cretheus, Deioneus, Magnes, Perieres, Salmoneus, Sisyphus, Alcyone, Canace, Perimede and Peisidice. Some sources stated that Calyce was the mother of Endymion, king of Elis, by her husband Aethlius, former king of Elis or by Zeus. Other sources made her the mother, not the wife, of Aethlius (again by Zeus), and omitted her giving birth to Endymion.
- Calyce, mother of Poseidon's son Cycnus. She was given as the daughter of Hecaton. Cycnus was born in secret, and left to die on the coast, but went on to become a king. In some accounts, the mother of Cycnus was called Harpale or Scamandrodice or lastly, an unnamed Nereid.
- Calyce, a chaste maiden who was in love with one Euathlus and prayed to Aphrodite that she may become his wife rather than mistress. Nevertheless, Euathlus rejected her and she threw herself off a cliff.
- Calyce, a maenad named in a vase painting. It is possible that she is the same as the above Nysiad.

== Modern references ==
- The lunar crater Kalyke is named after the first Kalyke, as is a moon of Jupiter.
