= Cretheus =

Greek mythological figure

In Greek mythology, Cretheus (/ˈkriːθiəs, -θjuːs/; Ancient Greek: Κρηθεύς, romanized: Krētheus) was the king and founder of Iolcus.

== Family ==
Cretheus was the son of King Aeolus of Aeolia (son of Hellen) by either Enarete or Laodice. He was the brother of Sisyphus, Athamas, Salmoneus, Deion, Magnes, Perieres, Canace, Alcyone, Peisidice, Calyce and Perimede.

Cretheus's wives were Tyro, his niece, and Demodice or Biadice. With Tyro, he fathered Aeson, Pheres, and Amythaon.

== Mythology ==
When Cretheus found out that Tyro had an affair with Poseidon, he left her and married Demodice. He also had several daughters, namely Hippolyte, future wife of Acastus (otherwise known as Astydamia), Myrina who married Thoas, and possibly Phalanna, eponym of Phalanna.
