= Aeolus (son of Hellen) =

Eponymous hero of the Aeolians

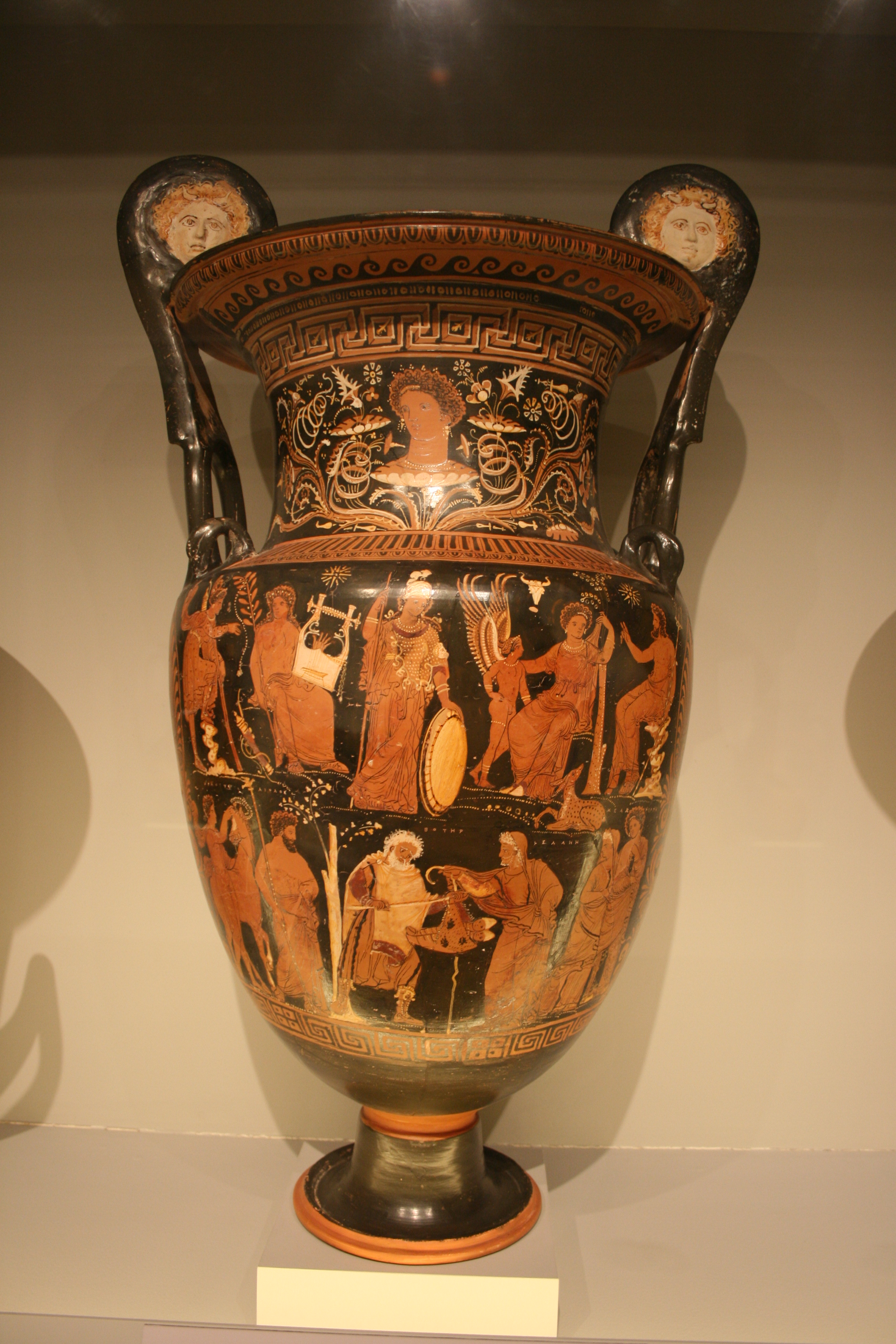
Aeolus (left) and a shepherd (right) in a depiction of the story of Melanippe from Euripides' lost play Melanippe Wise, on an Apulian volute krater, dating from the late fourth century BC.

In Greek mythology, Aeolus or Aiolos (/ˈiːələs/; Ancient Greek: Αἴολος [ǎi̯.olos]; Modern Greek: Αίολος [ˈe.olos]) was the son of Hellen, the ruler of Aeolia (later called Thessaly), and the eponym of the Aeolians, one of the four main tribes of the Greeks. According to the mythographer Apollodorus, Aeolus was the father of seven sons: Cretheus, Sisyphus, Athamas, Salmoneus, Deion, Magnes, Perieres, and five daughters: Canace, Alcyone, Pisidice, Calyce, and Perimede. He was said to have killed his daughter Canace (or forced her to kill herself) because she had committed incest with her brother Macareus. This Aeolus was sometimes confused with the Aeolus who was the ruler of the winds.

== Family ==
Aeolus was one of the central figures in the myths that were invented about the origins of the Greek people. He was the grandson of Deucalion the son of Prometheus, and the survivor of a great primordial flood, that covered much, if not all, of Greece (and the rest of the world, in later accounts). From Deucalion and his wife Pyrrha, sprang a new race of people, which repopulated Central Greece and the western Peloponnese. Deucalion and Pyrrha had a son Hellen, the eponym of the Hellenes, another name for the Greeks.

From Hellen came the eponyms of the four major tribes of the Greek people. According to the Hesiodic Catalogue of Women, Hellen had three sons: Dorus, Xuthus, and Aeolus. Dorus was the eponym of the Dorians, and Xuthus's sons Achaeus and Ion were, respectively, the eponyms of the Acheaens and Ionians. However, it was from Hellen's third son Aeolus, the eponym of the Aeolians, that most if not all, of the heroes and heroines of the Deucalionids sprang.

The surviving Catalogue fragments do not contain the name of Aeolus's mother, but according to a scholion on Plato's Symposium citing Hellanicus (fl. late fifth century BC), her name was Othreis (Ὀθρηίς), while according to Apollodorus she was a nymph named Orseis (Ὀρσηίς). M. L. West says that both Othreis and Orseis are "probably" corruptions of Othyis (Ὀθρυίς), a nymph of Mount Othrys.

According to Apollodorus, Aeolus married Enarete, the daughter of Deimachus, and together they had seven sons and five daughters. Apollodorus lists the sons as Cretheus, Sisyphus, Athamas, Salmoneus, Deion, Magnes, and Perieres, and the daughters as Canace, Alcyone, Pisidice, Calyce, and Perimede. The Hesiodic Catalogue also listed seven sons and five daughters, however only the names Cretheus, Athamas, Sisyphus, Salmoneus, Perieres, Pisidice, Alcyone, and Perimede are preserved. Apollodorus's "Deion", "Calyce" and "Canace" would fit well into the missing gaps in the papyrus that preserves this part of the Catalogue, however, his "Magnes" conflicts with the Catalogues' use of that name elsewhere. Hellanicus apparently also had Aeolus as the father of Salmoneus by Iphis.

Other sources give other children by other mothers. The tragic playwright Euripides made Melanippe a daughter of Aeolus and Hippe (or Hippo), daughter of the Centaur Cheiron. According to the Roman mythographer Hyginus, the Macareus who had a tragic love affair with his sister Canace, was the son of "Aeolus son of Hellen". Xuthus, Aeolus's brother according to the Hesiodic Catalogue, and Apollodorus, was also said to be his son. Others who were sometimes said to have had Aeolus as a father include: Macedon, Minyas, Mimas, Cercaphus, Aethlius, Ceyx, Arne, Antiope, Tanagra, Iope and Tritogeneia.

Genealogy

Iapetus	Clymene
Prometheus	Epimetheus	Pandora
Deucalion	Pyrrha
Hellen	Orseis
Dorus	Xuthus	AEOLUS
Achaeus	Ion
Cretheus	Sisyphus	Athamas	Salmoneus	Deion	Magnes	Perieres
Canace	Alcyone	Pisidice	Calyce	Perimede

Comparative table of immediate family
Relation	Names	Sources														
Relation	Names	Homer	Hes.	Eur.	Hellan.	Sch. on Il.	Apollon.	Diod.	Str.	Hyg.	Ovid	Apollod.	Paus.	Clem.	Step.	Eus.
Parents	Hellen		✓	✓				✓		✓						
Parents	Zeus			✓												
Parents	Hellen and Othreis				✓											
Parents	Hellen and Orseis											✓				
Mothers of his children	Hippe (or Hippo)			✓						✓						
Mothers of his children	Eurydice			✓												
Mothers of his children	Iphis				✓											
Mothers of his children	Aegiale									✓						
Mothers of his children	Enarete											✓				
Sons	Sisyphus	✓	✓	✓Eu.						✓		✓En.	✓			
Sons	Cretheus		✓	✓Eu.			✓					✓En.	✓			
Sons	Athamas		✓				✓			✓	✓	✓En.	✓			
Sons	Salmoneus		✓	✓Eu.	✓I.			✓		✓		✓En.				
Sons	Perieres		✓									✓En.	✓			
Sons	Xuthus			✓		✓										
Sons	Macedon				✓											✓
Sons	Minyas		?				✓									
Sons	Mimas							✓								
Sons	Cercaphus								✓							
Sons	Macareus (or Macar)									✓	?		?			
Sons	Deion		?								✓	✓En.				
Sons	Magnes											✓En.	✓			
Sons	Aethlius												✓			
Sons	Ceyx													✓		
Daughters	Arne					✓							✓			
Daughters	Alcyone		✓							✓A.	✓	✓En.				
Daughters	Canace		?							✓	✓	✓En.				
Daughters	Melanippe			✓H.						✓H.						
Daughters	Antiope									✓						
Daughters	Pisidice		✓									✓En.				
Daughters	Calyce		?									✓En.				
Daughters	Perimede		✓									✓En.				
Daughters	Tanagra												✓			
Daughters	Iope														✓	

== Mythology ==
Apart from being the progenitor of many important descendants, Aeolus himself was of little mythological note. However he does play a role in one myth involving Hippe ('Mare'), the daughter of the Centaur Cheiron. Aeolus seduced Hippe, producing a daughter Melanippe, about whom the tragic playwright Euripides wrote two lost plays. The story, as it apparently appeared in Euripides's plays, is preserved in the astronomical literature of Eratosthenes and Hyginus. According to these sources, after becoming pregnant with Aeolus's child, Hippe fled into the mountains to escape the discovery of her pregnancy by her father Cheiron. When she was about to give birth and be discovered by her father, who had arrived in search of her, Hippe prayed to the gods to be made unrecognizable, and she was transformed into a horse and placed among the stars, becoming the constellation "the Horse" (modern Pegasus).

The Romans Ovid, and Hyginus, tell of the tragic love affair between Aeolus's son Macareus and his daughter Canace. According to Hyginus, after the incest Macareus killed himself, and Aeolus killed Canace. While, according to Ovid, Aeolus threw out Canace's new born baby as "prey to dogs and hungry birds", and gave Canace a sword and commanded her to kill herself with it.

This Aeolus was sometimes confused (or identified) with the Aeolus who is the keeper of the winds encountered by Odysseus in Homer's Odyssey. The confusion perhaps first occurs in Euripides's lost tragedy Aeolus, where, although clearly based on the Odyssey's Aeolus, Euripides's Aeolus is, like Aeolus the son of Hellen, the father of a daughter Canace, and if the two are not identified, then they seem, at least, to be related. Although in the Odyssey, that Aeolus was the son of Hippotes, Hyginus describes the Aeolus encountered by Odysseus as "Aeolus, son of Hellen, to whom control of the winds had been given by Jove [the Roman equivalent of Zeus]". Ovid has Alcyone, as well as the tragic lovers Canace and Macareus, being children of an Aeolus who was the ruler of the winds, and calls Alcyone "Hippotades", ie. a descendant of Hippotes.
