= Canace =

Greek mythological figure

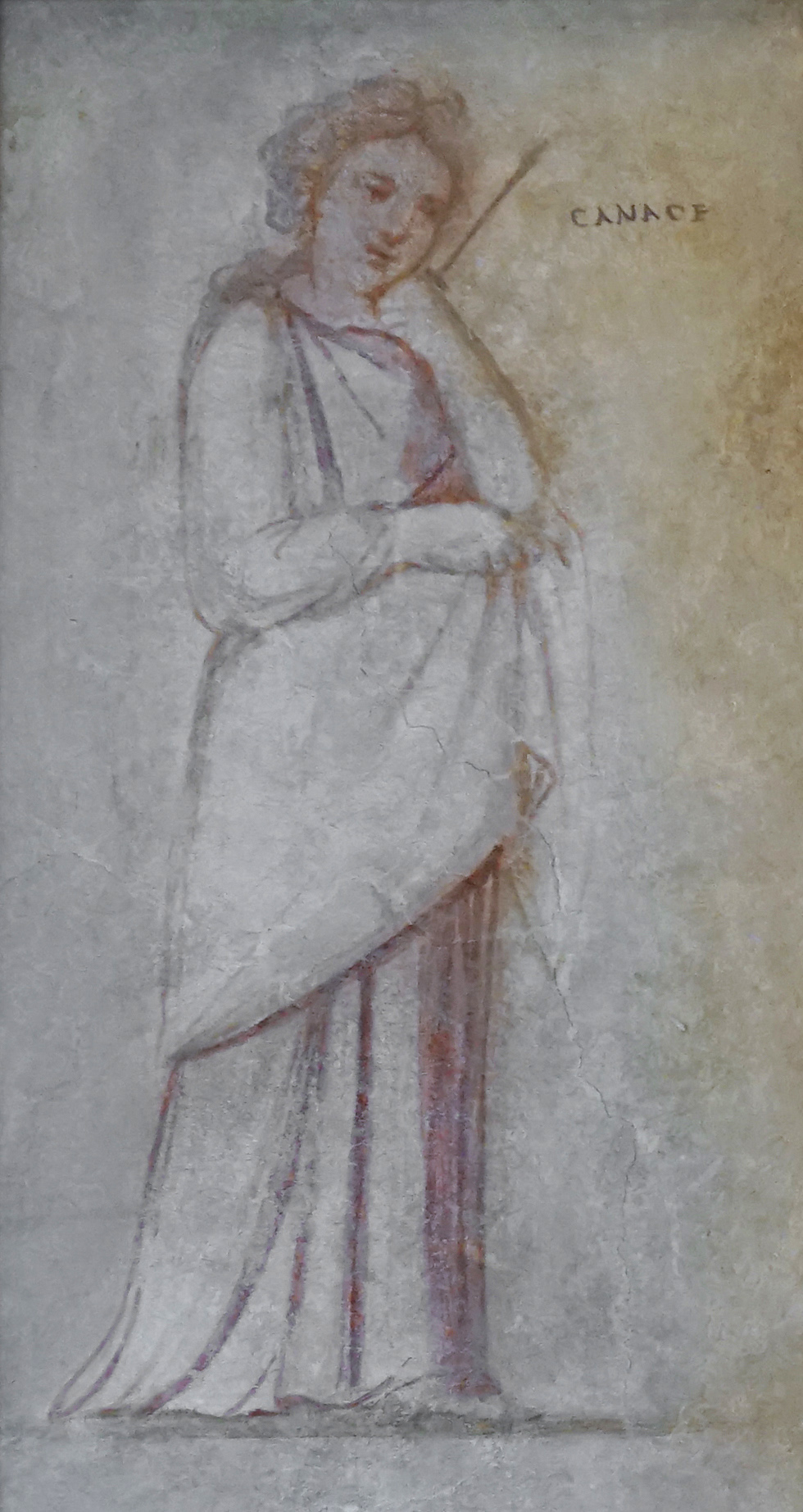
Canace in a Roman wall painting from Tor Marancia, Rome, 3rd century CE (Vatican Library)

In Greek mythology, Canace (/ˈkænəˌsiː/; Ancient Greek: Κανάκη, romanized: Kanákē, lit. 'barking') was the daughter of Aeolus, the king of Thessaly, and Enarete, daughter of Deimachus. She is known for the story, told by Euripides and Ovid, of her incestuous relationship with her brother Macareus and her subsequent suicide.

== Early mythological tradition ==
In the Hesiodic Catalogue of Women, Canace is one of the daughters of the Thessalian king Aeolus, son of Hellen, and Enarete, daughter of Deimachus. According to the Bibliotheca attributed to Apollodorus, the brothers of Canace were Athamas, Cretheus, Deioneus, Magnes, Perieres, Salmoneus, and Sisyphus; her sisters were Alcyone, Calyce, Peisidice, and Perimede By Poseidon she was the mother of Aloeus, Epopeus, Hopleus, Nireus and Triops.

== Canace and Macareus ==
=== Euripides ===
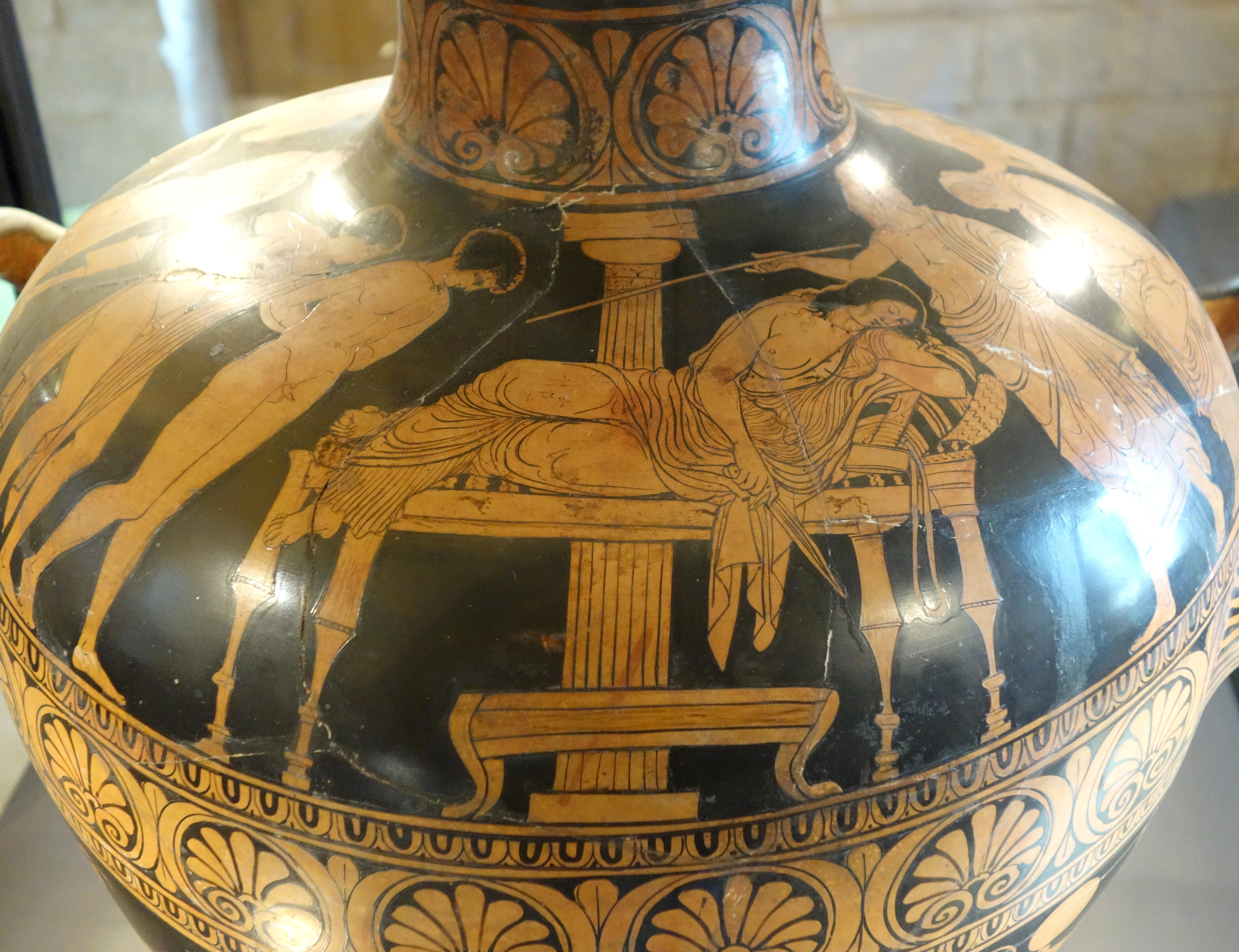
The death of Canace on a Lucanian red-figure hydria, c. 415–410 BCE (Bari, Museo archeologico di S. Scholastica). Canace lies on the bed, the sword in her hand; to the left stands Macareus, head lowered; to the right stands Aeolus, gesturing toward Macareus with his staff.

In the later Greek and Roman tradition, Canace was known chiefly for her incestuous relationship with her brother Macareus and her subsequent suicide. The story was made famous by Euripides in a tragedy entitled Aeolus, produced in Athens in the 420s BCE. The play is lost, but a general outline of its plot can be reconstructed from other sources, including an ancient hypothesis (summary) partially preserved on papyrus. Euripides conflated the Thessalian king Aeolus, son of Hellen, with the Homeric Aeolus, son of Hippotes and ruler of the winds; the latter is said in the Odyssey to have married his six sons to his six daughters, and this may have been the inspiration for the tragedy. In Euripides' version, Canace is raped by her brother Macareus. She becomes pregnant but hides her condition by feigning illness. Macareus, hoping to cover up the deed, persuades his father to allow his six sons to marry his six daughters. Aeolus agrees, but assigns each sister to a brother by lot, and Macareus's plan fails when Canace is allotted not to him but a different brother. When Aeolus discovers the truth, he sends Canace a sword, which she uses to kill herself; on hearing the news, Macareus does the same.

Euripides' tragedy was well-known: it was parodied in comedies by Aristophanes and Antiphanes, and a scene from the play may be depicted in a south Italian vase painting created about a decade after the first performance (see below). The Euripidean narrative became the definitive version, influencing the treatments by all later authors. Plato in the mid-4th century BCE mentioned "Macareus secretly having intercourse with a sister" as a notable example of vice on the stage, and a version of the story that followed the Euripidean narrative closely appeared in the Tyrrhenika of the ethnographer and historian Sostratus of Nysa in the first half of the 1st century BCE. The story remained popular in the Roman period: a satirical epigram by the poet Lucillius, who wrote during the reign of Nero, mocks a dancer who portrayed Canace in a mime for failing to kill herself onstage, and "Canace giving birth" was said to be among the tragic roles performed by the emperor Nero himself.

=== Ovid ===
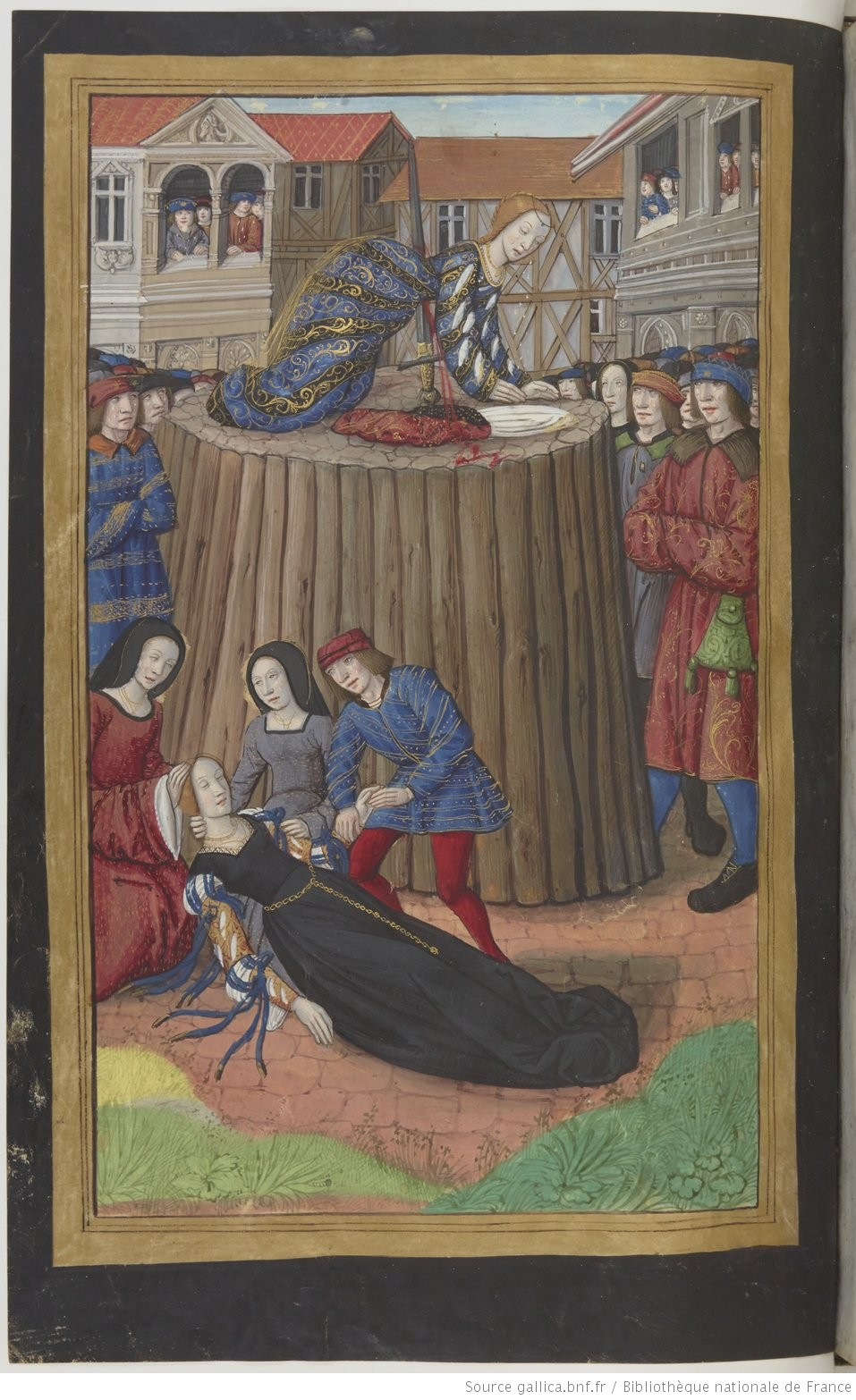
The suicide of Canace in a 15th-century manuscript of Ovid's Heroides (Bibliothèque nationale de France MS Francais 874, fol. 47v)

The longest surviving ancient treatment of the story is that of the Latin poet Ovid, who made Canace the subject of one of the Heroides, a collection of poems composed in the late 1st century BCE in the form of letters written by mythological women to their lovers. Ovid was clearly indebted to Euripides, but his version differs in tone and detail. He emphasizes the romantic and pathetic elements of the story: Ovid's Canace is not raped or seduced, but falls in love with Macareus; the two are mutual victims of their own passion. The incestuous element of the story is acknowledged, but is not prominent; instead the relationship is treated in the manner of a normal love affair, albeit with a tragic ending. Canace writes her letter to Macareus in the final moments before her death, holding the sword sent by Aeolus in her lap. She recalls the steps she took to conceal her pregnancy, her attempted abortion, the painful birth, and the discovery and subsequent exposure of the child by her father, and concludes by asking Macareus to gather the bones of her son and inter them with her.

== In ancient art ==
The death of Canace appears on a Lucanian hydria found in Canosa, now in the archaeological museum in Bari. The vase is attributed to the Amykos Painter, an early south Italian red-figure vase painter, and has been dated to c. 415–410 BCE. Although originally thought to depict an episode from the story of Phaedra and Hippolytos, it was identified as the death of Candace by August Kalkmann in 1883. It may have been influenced by a scene from Euripides' lost tragedy Aeolos, first produced in Athens about a decade earlier.

A Roman wall painting in the Vatican Library shows Canace holding a sword and identified by a painted inscription. It was found in the early 19th century in an ancient villa at Tor Marancia, c. 2 km outside the Porta San Sebastiano in Rome. The portrait of Canace is one of a group of fragments depicting mythological heroines, all of whom came to grief as a result of illicit passions; the other surviving fragments show Phaedra, Myrrha, Pasiphaë, and Scylla (the daughter of Nisos).

According to Pliny the Elder, the artist Aristeides of Thebes, who was active in the second half of the 4th century BCE, painted a picture of "a woman dying from love of her brother (anapauomenen [i.e., ἀναπαυομένην] propter fratris amorem). Although Pliny does not give the name of the woman, this passage has frequently been interpreted as a reference to a painting of Canace.

== In later literature ==
It was largely through the Ovidian version that the story was known to later writers. The tale of "Canace and Machaire" is included in the third book of John Gower's Confessio Amantis (c. 1390). In Italy, Canace was the subject of at least three new tragedies: one by Giovanni Falugi (c. 1529), dedicated to Ippolito de' Medici; another by Sperone Speroni, written in 1542 and first published in 1546; and another by Carlo Tebaldi-Fores, published in 1820.
