= Ceyx of Trachis =

In Greek mythology, Ceyx (/ˈsiːɪks/; Ancient Greek: Κήυξ, romanized: Kḗux, lit. 'gannet') was a king of Trachis in Thessaly.

== Family ==
In some accounts, Ceyx was Amphitryon's nephew, with Heracles building Trachis for him. He was the father of Hippasus, alternatively of Hylas and lastly, of Themistonoe, who married King Cycnus. Muller supposes that the marriage of Ceyx and his connection with Heracles were the subjects of ancient poems.

== Mythology ==
Ceyx received Heracles and Heracles's sons later fled to him. He befriended Heracles and offered him protection against King Eurystheus. His son Hippasus accompanied Heracles on his campaign against King Eurytus of Oechalia, during which Hippasus was slain in battle.
