= August Kalkmann =

German art historian and archaeologist (1853-1905)

August Kalkmann (24 March 1853, in Hamburg – 19 February 1905, in Berlin) was a German classical archaeologist and art historian.

He studied under Franz Bücheler, Hermann Usener and Reinhard Kekulé von Stradonitz at the University of Bonn, receiving his doctorate in 1881 with a dissertation on Euripides' Hippolytus. In 1885 he qualified as a lecturer, and in 1900 became an associate professor at the University of Berlin.

== Principal works ==
- De Hippolytis Euripideis quaestiones novae, 1881 (dissertation).
- Über Darstellungen der Hippolytos-Sage, 1883 – Representations on the legend of Hippolytus.
- Pausanias der Perieget. Untersuchungen über seine Schriftstellerei und seine Quellen, 1886 – Pausanias the Periegete.
- Die Proportionen des Gesichts in der griechischen Kunst, 1893 – On proportions of the face in Greek art.
- Die Quellen der Kunstgeschichte der Plinius, 1898 – The source of art history of Pliny.
- August Kalkmanns nachgelassenes Werk, 1909 – August Kalkmann's posthumous work (edited by Hermann Voss).
