= Enarete =

Daughter of Deimachus in Greek mythology

In Greek mythology, Enarete (/ɪˈnærɪtiː/, Ancient Greek: Ἐναρέτη Ancient Greek: Ἐναρέτη, romanized: Enaretē, lit. 'virtuous' or 'in virtue', from en 'in' and arete 'virtue''), or Aenarete (Αἰναρέτη Ainarete), was a queen of Aeolia (i.e. Thessaly) and ancestor of the Aeolians.

== Biography ==
Enarete was the daughter of Deimachus and wife of King Aeolus of Thessaly, son of the Greek progenitor Hellen. By the latter, she became the mother of his children including Cretheus, Sisyphus, Athamas, Salmoneus, Deion, Magnes, Perieres, Canace, Alcyone, Peisidice, Calyce and Perimede.

Enarete may be similar to Eurydice who bore Salmoneus, Sisyphus and Cretheus to Aeolus.
