= Athamas =

Greek mythological figure

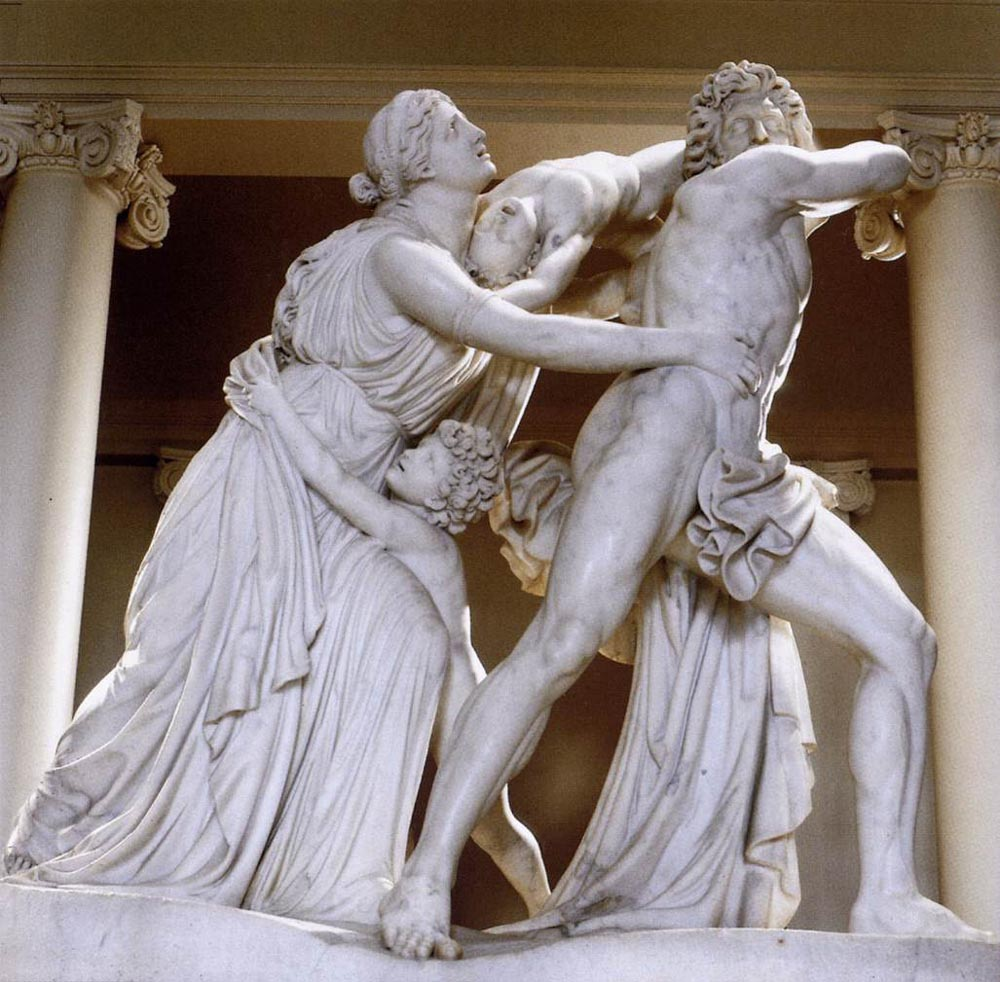
The Fury of Athamas by John Flaxman (1755-1826).

In Greek mythology, Athamas (/ˈæθəməs/; Ancient Greek: Ἀθάμας, romanized: Athámas) was a Boeotian king.

== Family ==
Athamas was a Thessalian prince and the son of King Aeolus of Aeolia and Enarete, daughter of Deimachus. He was the brother of Salmoneus, Sisyphus, Cretheus, Perieres, Deioneus, Magnes, Calyce, Canace, Alcyone, Pisidice and Perimede.

Athamas sired several children by his first wife, the goddess Nephele, and his other wives Ino and Themisto. Nephele first bore to him twins, a son Phrixus and a daughter Helle; and also a second son, Macistus. He subsequently married Ino, daughter of Cadmus, with whom he had two children: Learches and Melicertes. By the daughter of Hypseus, Themisto, he was the father of Sphincius and Orchomenus or Schoeneus and Leucon and also, Erythrius and Ptous.

== Mythology ==
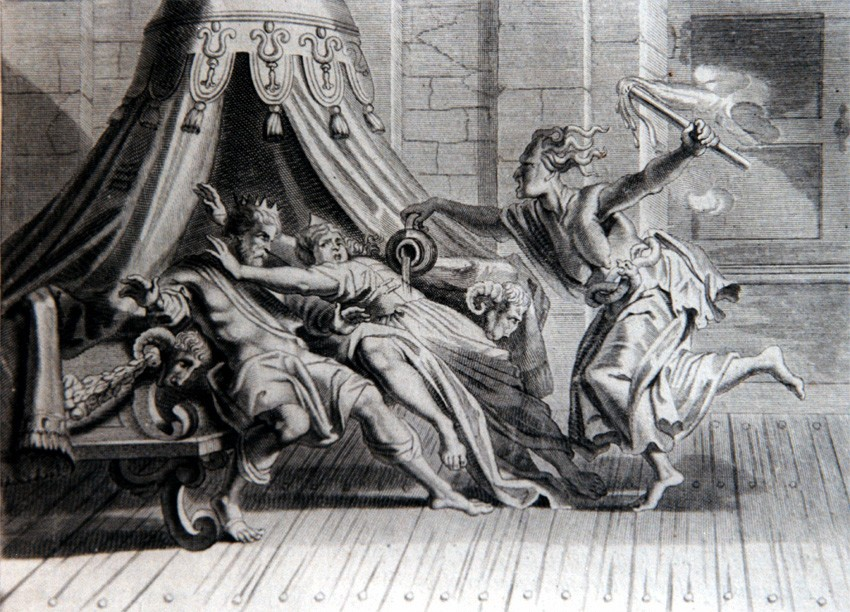
Tisiphone maddens Athamas & Ino (17th century)

Phrixus and Helle were hated by their stepmother, Ino. Ino hatched a devious plot to get rid of the twins, roasting all the town's crop seeds so they would not grow. The local farmers, frightened of famine, asked a nearby oracle for assistance. Ino bribed the men sent to the oracle to lie and tell the others that the oracle required the sacrifice of Phrixus. Athamas reluctantly agreed. But, before Phrixus could be killed, he and Helle were spirited away by a flying golden ram sent by Nephele, their natural mother. Helle fell off the ram into the Hellespont (which was named after her) and died, but Phrixus survived all the way to Colchis, where King Aeëtes took him in and treated him kindly, giving Phrixus his daughter Chalciope in marriage. In gratitude, Phrixus gave the king the golden fleece of the ram, which Aeëtes hung in a tree in his kingdom.

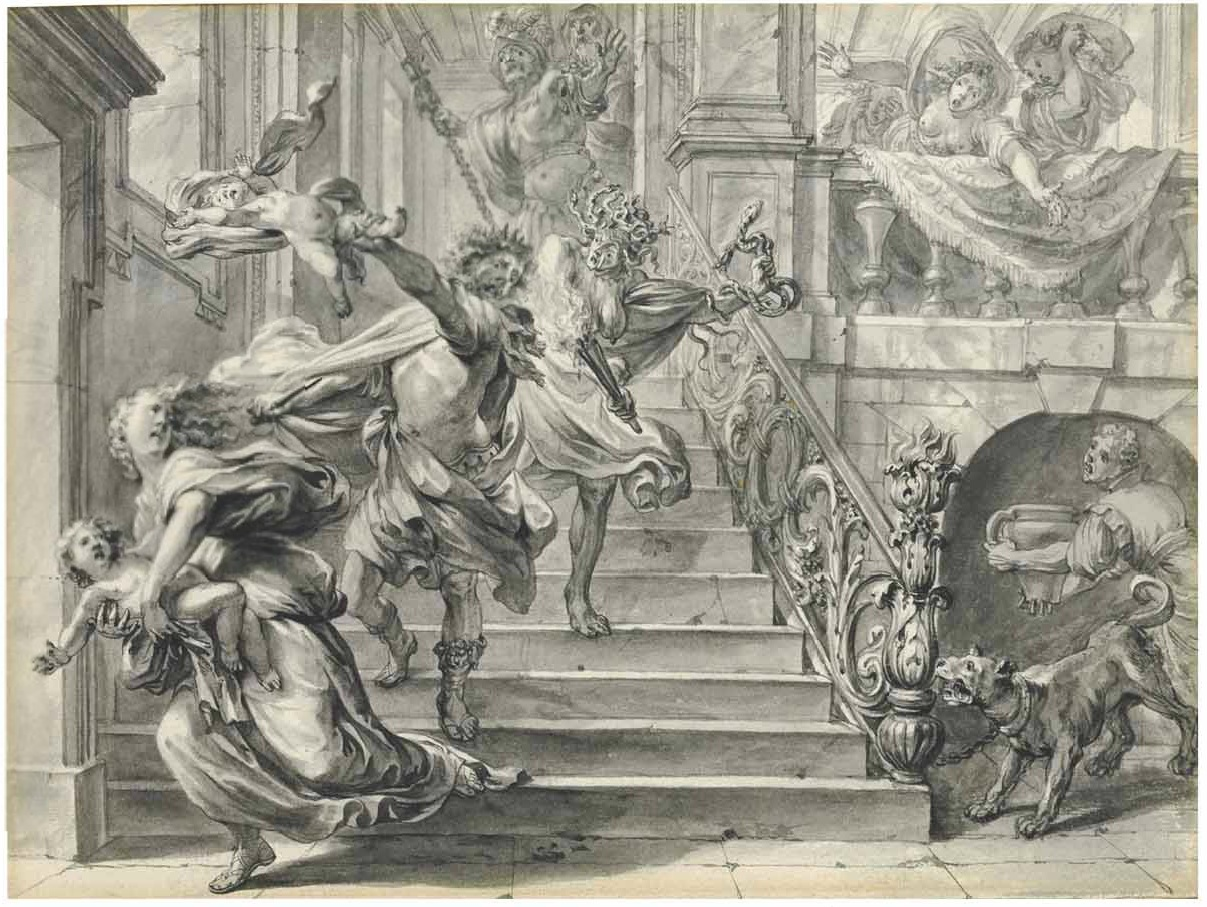
Athamas tearing apart his children by Godfried Maes

Later, Ino raised Dionysus, her nephew, son of her sister Semele, causing Hera's intense jealousy. In vengeance, Hera struck Athamas with insanity. Athamas went mad and slew one of his sons, Learchus; Ino, to escape the pursuit of her frenzied husband, threw herself into the sea with her son Melicertes. Both were afterwards worshipped as marine divinities, Ino as Leucothea, Melicertes as Palaemon. In another version Ino killed Melicertes after finding out that Athamas was sleeping with a slave woman named Antiphera.

Athamas, with the guilt of his son's murder upon him, was obliged to flee from Boeotia. He was ordered by the oracle to settle in a place where he should receive hospitality from wild beasts. This he found at Phthiotis in Thessaly, where he surprised some wolves eating sheep; on his approach they fled, leaving him the bones. Athamas, regarding this as the fulfilment of the oracle, settled there and married a third wife, Themisto (sons: Schoeneus, Leucon, Ptous and/or others). The spot was afterwards called the Athamanian plain. When Athamas returned to his second wife, Ino, Themisto sought revenge by dressing her children in white clothing and Ino's in black and directed that the children in black clothes be killed. Ino switched their clothes without Themisto's knowledge, and so Themisto caused the death of her own children.

According to some accounts, Athamas was succeeded on the throne by Presbon. A part of Kingdom of Athamas, and himself, moved in a northwesterly direction and took roots in a part of Pindus mountains in Epirus, called Athamanian mountains. So this population was called the Athamanians.

== Gallery ==
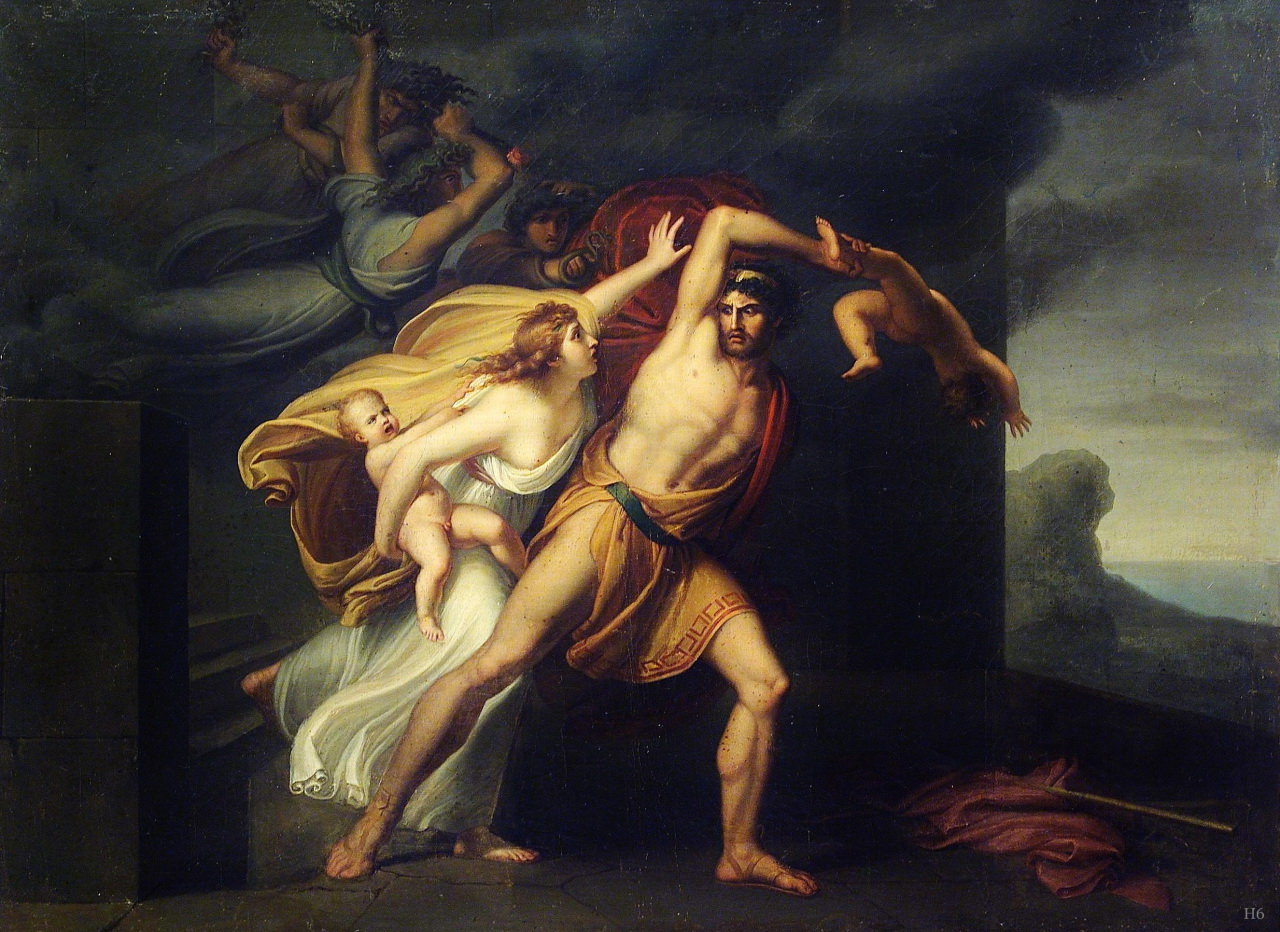
Atamante preso dalle Furie by Arcangelo Migliarini (1801) at Roma, Accademia di San Luca

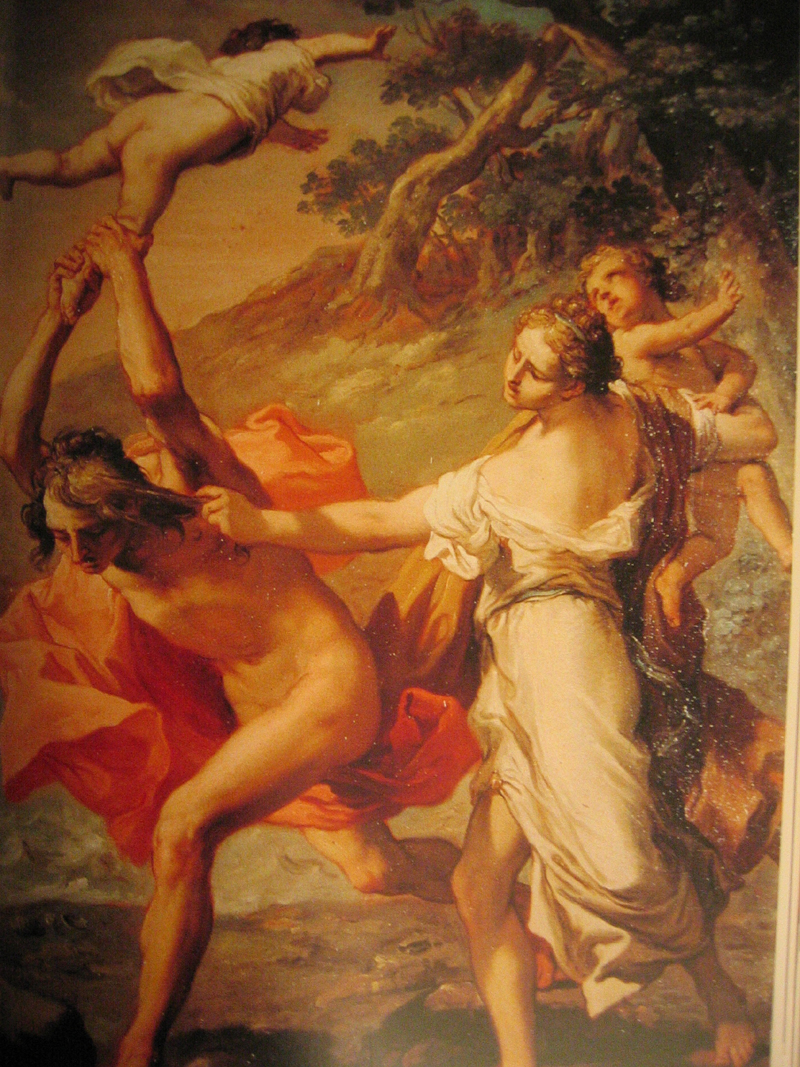
Athamas tue le fils d'Ino by Gaetano Gandolfi (1801)

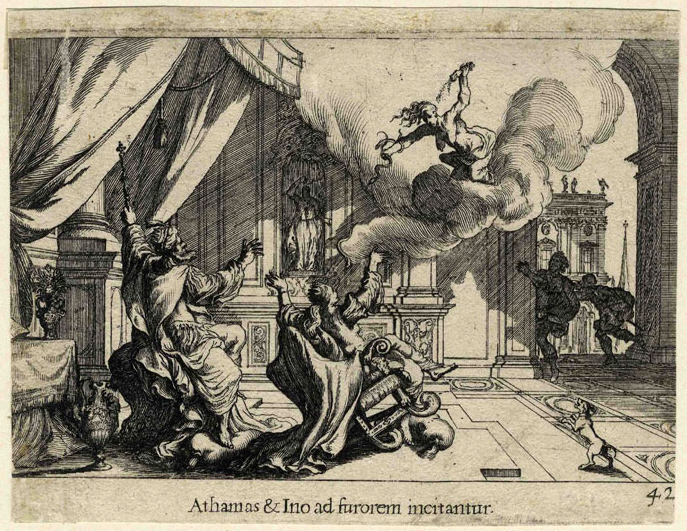
Athamas und Ino by Radierung (17th century)

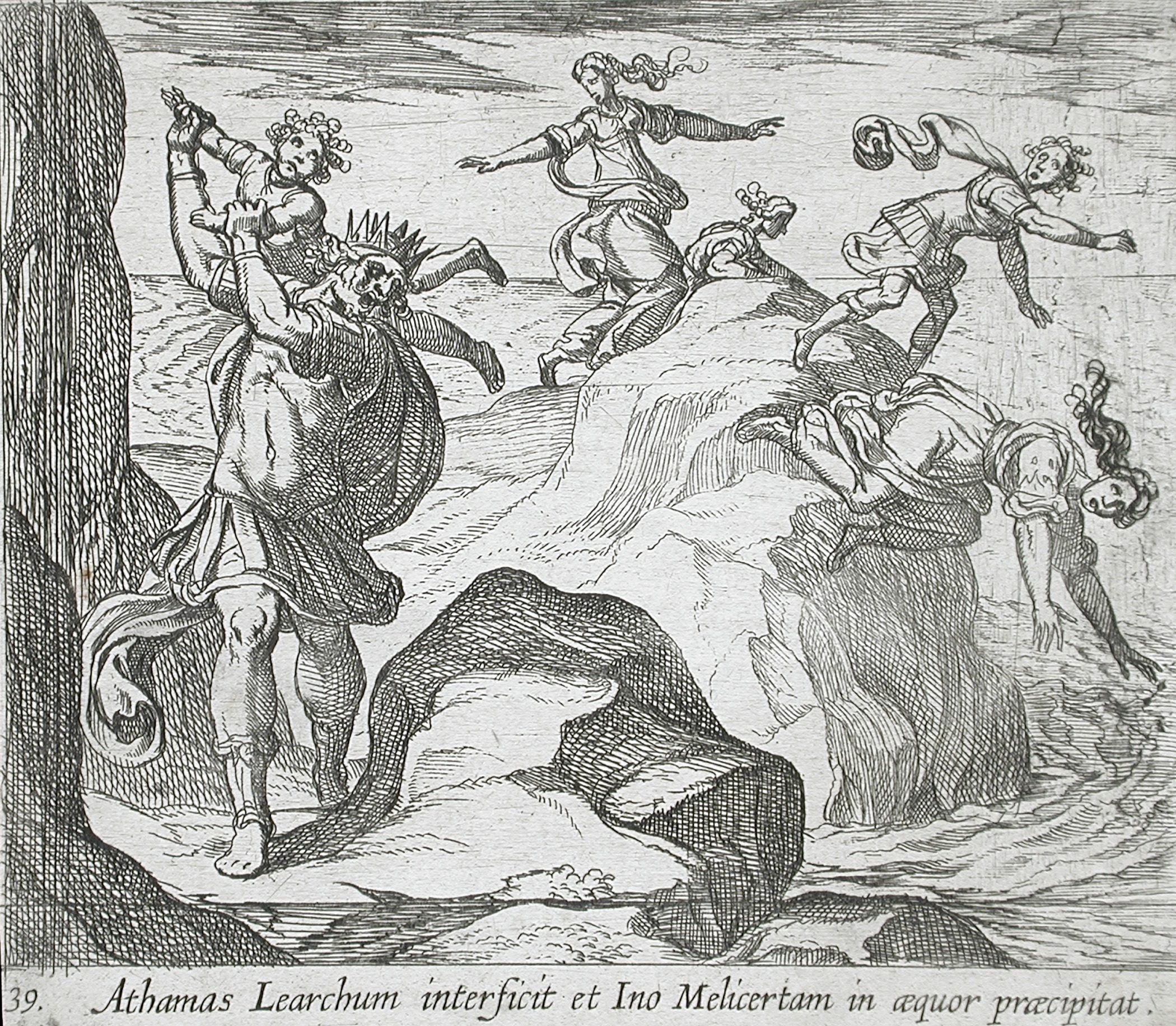
The Insane Athamas Killing Learchus, While Ino and Melicertor Jump into the Sea by Wilhelm Janson (Holland, Amsterdam), Antonio Tempesta (Italy, Florence, 1555-1630) at Los Angeles County Museum of Art, Los Angeles
