= The Bacchantes (film) =

1961 film by Giorgio Ferroni

- Directed by: Giorgio Ferroni
- Screenplay by: Giorgio Ferroni; Giorgio Stegani
- Based on: The Bacchae by Euripides
- Produced by: Giampaolo Bigazzi
- Starring: Taina Elg; Pierre Brice; Alessandra Panaro
- Cinematography: Pier Ludovico Pavoni
- Edited by: Giorgio Ferroni
- Music by: Mario Nascimbene
- Production companies: Cine del Luca; Vic Film; Lyre Films
- Release date: 2 March 1961 (Italy)
- Running time: 100 minutes
- Countries: Italy; France

The Bacchantes (Italian: Le baccanti) is a 1961 adventure-fantasy film directed by Giorgio Ferroni. It is loosely based on the Euripides' tragedy The Bacchae.

== Plot ==
Thebes, the birthplace of Dionysus (born from the union between the god Zeus and the mortal woman Semele) suffers from a terrible drought, which triggers popular discontent. This adds up to the accusations of the prophet Tiresias, who alleges drought to the wrath of Dionysus, blaming King Pentheus for not believing in his divine nature and not revering him.

Manto, daughter of Tiresias, gives water to a stranger, who reciprocates with wine sacred to Dionysus. She then confides in her friend Dirce, discussing their respective unhappy destinies: Manto will become a virgin sacred to Demeter, despite her being in love with the servant Lacdamos, while Dirce is engaged to Pentheus, while dreaming of a life free from the court.

Following an omen reported by a priest, Agave, Semele's sister and Pentheus's mother, reveals to her son the existence of an ancient prophecy, according to which Lacdamos will marry a virgin sacred to Demeter and their son will become king of Thebes. Lacdamos is in fact the son of Ino, Agave's elder sister, who had him kidnapped and raised as a servant to keep the throne for Pentheus. According to the priest, Manto is the virgin of prophecy, and rumors have come that she already knows Lacdamos. To avoid both the fulfillment of the prophecy and the popular turmoil, Pentheus orders the sacrifice of Manto in honor of Demeter to obtain better harvests. Dirce intercedes in vain with Pentheus to prevent Manto's sacrifice, involuntarily confirming that she is already in love with Lacdamos.

At the suggestion of Tiresias, the night before the sacrifice Dirce drinks the sacred wine to Dionysus and goes with other women to Mount Cithaeron, where she meets the stranger who gave the wine to Manto. The next day the stranger instigate the people against Pentheus, while a lightning bolt blocks the hand of the priest who would have killed Manto. The Theban youth then goes to the Cithaeron to celebrate bacchanalia in honor of Dionysus, as well as the marriage between Manto and Lacdamos. The stranger reveals indeed that Lacdamos is actually the cousin of Pentheus and legitimate king of Thebes; according to the laws, he can therefore take Manto as his wife even if she has already been consecrated to Demeter.

Pentheus sends soldiers to the Cytheron and imprisons the rebels. The stranger manages to save himself but the next day he spontaneously goes to the palace before Pentheus' wedding, which has him chained to the cliffs of the Cithaeron. However, to appease the people's spirits, he decides to free all the captured people, except Manto and Lacdamos. Dirce visits the chained stranger, with whom she has fallen in love, who nevertheless reveals that he is Dionysus and will soon leave his mortal body.

Meanwhile, Tiresias reveals to Polycrates, the current head of the tribe that belonged to Athamas (Lacdamo's father), that Lacdamos is the true king of Thebes. Polychrates' soldiers free him and Manto and join the Bacchae, fighting against the army of Pentheus. Lacdamos defeats Pentheus in a duel and becomes the new king of Thebes; Dionysus finally ascends to god, while Dirce will lead the Bacchae.

== Cast ==
- Taina Elg as Dirce
- Pierre Brice as Dionysus
- Alessandra Panaro as Manto
- Alberto Lupo as Pentheus
- Akim Tamiroff as Tiresias
- Raf Mattioli as Lacdamos
- Erno Crisa as Atteon
- Miranda Campa as Agave
- Gérard Landry as Shepherd
- Nerio Bernardi as High Priest
- Enzo Fiermonte as Polycrates
- Nino Marchetti as Theban

== Differences with mythology and Euripides' work ==
- Lacdamos' character does not exist; the children of Ino and Athamas (Learches and Melicertes) died as children and none of them married Manto
- Pentheus dies killed by his own mother, who has become a maenad under the control of Dionysus
- After the death of Pentheus the crown of Thebes passed to uncle Polydorus (only son of Cadmus and future great-grandfather of Oedipus)
- Dirce was the wife of Lycus, who will be the future regent of Thebes for Labdacus (son of Polydous and cousin of Pentheus)

== Release ==
The Bacchantes was released in Italy with a 100 minute running time on March 2, 1961.
