= Leucothea =

Greek sea goddess

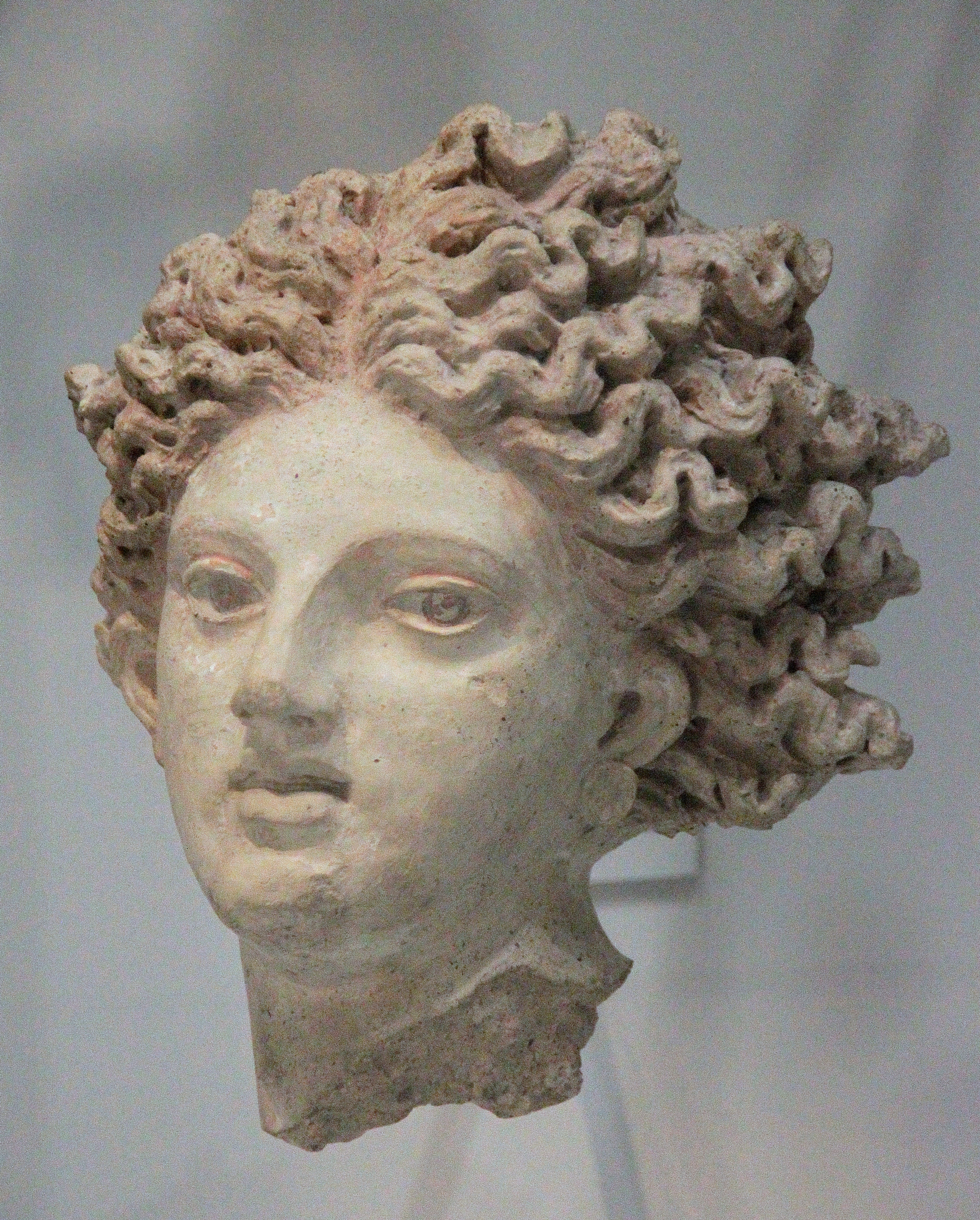
Leucothea, an Etruscan sculpture from Pyrgi, c. 350 BC (Museo Nazionale Etrusco di Villa Giulia, Rome)

In Greek mythology, Leucothea (/ljuːˈkoʊθiə/; Ancient Greek: Λευκοθέα, romanized: Leukothéa, lit. 'white goddess', Ancient Greek pronunciation: [leu̯.koˈt^{h}e.a]), sometimes also called Leucothoe (Ancient Greek: Λευκοθόη, romanized: Leukothóê or Leukothoē, lit. 'running white water', Ancient Greek pronunciation: [leu̯.koˈt^{h}o.εː]) was a sea goddess. Myths surrounding Leucothea typically concern her original identity, either as Ino or Halia, and her transformation into a goddess.

== Mythology ==
=== Ino's transfiguration into Leucothea ===
In more common versions of the story, the Boetian queen Ino, daughter of Cadmus and Harmonia, was transformed into Leucothea. Ino's sister, Semele, was the mother of Dionysus by Zeus. After Semele's death, Ino and her husband Athamas helped raise the young Dionysus. This action invoked Hera's wrath and jealousy, and she struck Ino with insanity, causing her to boil her son Melicertes alive. When she finally came to her senses, she was horrified and leapt into the sea with the body of her dead son. Zeus took pity, and transformed Melicertes into Palaemon, the patron of the Isthmian Games, and Ino into Leucothea.

In another version of the myth, Ino's husband Athamas was instead the one Hera struck with insanity. Athamas began to hunt his family, first killing their son Learchus, before setting out to find and kill Ino and Melicertes. To escape Athamas, Ino and Melicertes leapt into the sea, and were transformed.

As a goddess, Leucothea had a temple and oracle in Colchis, which was said to be founded by Phrixus. She was also celebrated at the Roman festival of Matralia, as she was often conflated with the Roman goddess Mater Matuta. During the festival, parents would nurse, care for, and pray for their nieces and nephews instead of their own children, emulating how Ino cared for her nephew, Dionysus.

In the Odyssey, Homer makes Leucothea the transfiguration of Ino. When Odysseus is stranded at sea on a broken ship, Leucothea suddenly appears and tells Odysseus to discard the garments that Calypso had given him, wind her veil (Note: "veil" is a translation of Ancient Greek: κρήδεμνον, romanized: krḗdemnon) around himself, discard his raft, and begin to swim instead, claiming that it will bring him to land. While Odysseus doesn't believe the goddess at first, he eventually does so, and after three days, washes upon the shores of Scheria.

=== Halia's transfiguration into Leucothea ===
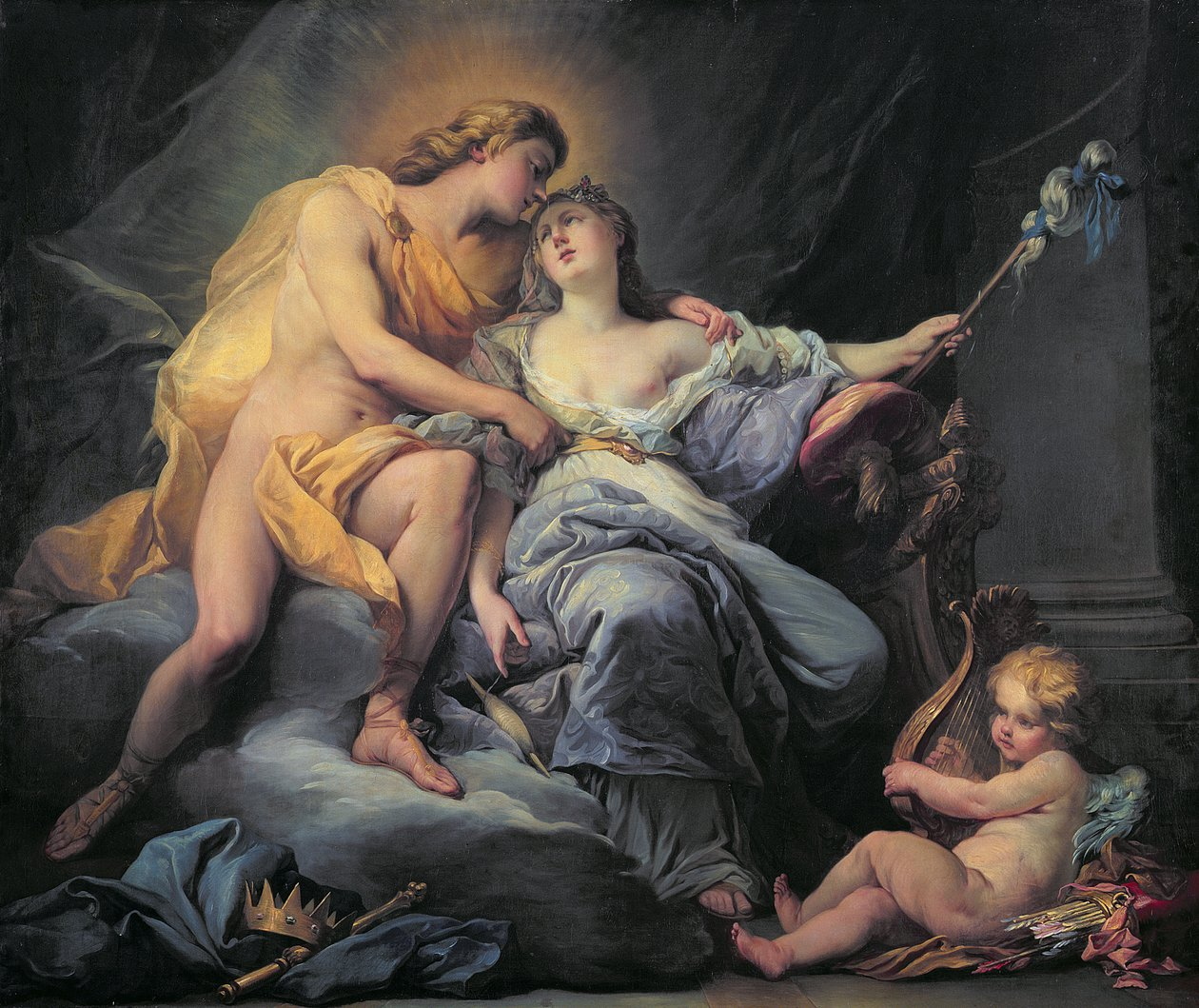
Apollo and Leucothea. A painting by Antoine Boizot, 1737 (Musée des Beaux-Arts de Tours)

In the version of the myth from Rhodes, a nymph or minor goddess named Halia (Note: Halia means "salty" or "of the sea"; perhaps a personification of the saltiness of the sea.) was the one who became Leucothea. Before her transformation, Halia was the daughter of Thalassa and sister to the Telchines. Poseidon became enamored with Halia and together they had seven children: a daughter, Rhodos, and six sons. One day, when Aphrodite was sailing past Rhodes and attempted to stop at the island, their sons prevented the goddess from doing so. In anger, Aphrodite caused them to go mad, and they raped their mother. In anguish, Halia threw herself into the sea and became Leucothea. When Poseidon learned of what had happened, the sons were imprisoned beneath the island. The people of Rhodes traced their mythic descent from Rhodos and the sun god Helios.

=== Other myths ===
Once, Leucothea transformed herself into a swan, and was caught by Smicrus and his foster brother(s). The boys put the swan in a dress and then fought over which would get to present the swan to their father. Leucothea then revealed herself and, amused by their strife over her, she instructed them to spread her honour among the Milesians in the form of boys' athletic contests, and to tell their father to cherish Smicrus above all.

It is possible that Leucothea is the "Leucothoe" that Hyginus makes the mother of Thersanon by Helios, although he could be referring to another woman by the same name.

== References in art and popular culture ==
- Leucothea is invoked as an evil-averting deity in an epigram by Philodemus preserved in the Greek Anthology.
- Milton, in Paradise Lost, associates Leucothea with the morning dew, in the scene in which the archangel Michael descends to Adam and Eve to declare that they must no longer abide in Paradise (1674 edition book XI, lines 133–136):
  …Mean while
  To resalute the world with sacred light,
  Leucothea wak’d, and with fresh dews imbalm’d
  the Earth…
- Leucothea is mentioned by Robert Graves in The White Goddess.
- In Ezra Pound's Cantos, she is one of the goddess figures who comes to the poet's aid in Section: Rock-Drill (Cantos 85–95). She is introduced in Canto 91 as "Cadmus's daughter":
  As the sea-gull Κάδμου θυγάτηρ said to Odysseus
  KADMOU THUGATER
  "get rid of parap[h]ernalia"
- She returns in Cantos 93 ("Κάδμου θυγάτηρ") and 95 ("Κάδμου θυγάτηρ/ bringing light per diafana/ λευκὁς Λευκόθοε/ white foam, a sea-gull… 'My bikini is worth yr/ raft'. Said Leucothae… Then Leucothea had pity,/'mortal once/ Who now is a sea-god…'"), and reappears at the beginning of Canto 96, the first of the Thrones section ("Κρήδεμνον…/ κρήδεμνον…/ and the wave concealed her,/ dark mass of great water.").
- Leucothea appears twice in Dialoghi con Leucò (Dialogues with Leucò) by Cesare Pavese, which is dedicated to her.
- Leucothoé was the first work by the Irish playwright Isaac Bickerstaffe published in 1756.
- In Marcel Proust's In the Shadow of Young Girls in Flower, Leucothea becomes a metaphor for the mist that covers a young man's gaze when looking on the beauty of young women: "…a cloud that had re-formed a few days later, once I had met them, muting the glow of their loveliness, often passing between them and my eyes, which saw them now dimmed, as through a gentle haze, reminiscent of Virgil's Leucothea."
- "Leukothea" is a poem by Keith Douglas.

== Namesake ==
- 35 Leukothea

== General references ==
- Burkert, Walter (1985). Greek Religion.
- Cooper, J.C., ed. (1997). Brewer's Book of Myth and Legend. Oxford: Helicon Publishing Ltd.
- Kerenyi, Karl (1951). The Gods of the Greeks.
- Russo, Sergio (2017). Quando il mare profuma di ambrosia. Leucotea e Palemone nel Mediterraneo.
