= Mrs Woodham =

Mrs. Woodham
- Born: Circa 1743; United Kingdom
- Died: 2 February 1803; United Kingdom
- Occupations: Singer; Actress

Mrs Woodham (formerly Smith; née Spencer) was an entertainer known in both Dublin and London with the nickname "Buck Spencer".

She was born in the Kingdom of Great Britain in or before 1743, apparently surnamed Spencer. She studied under Thomas Arne. A competitor of hers was the child prodigy and soprabo singer Charlotte Brent. She appeared at the Smock Alley Theatre in the 1750s. She was a smart dresser and was nicknamed "Buck Spencer". She performed in Thomas Arne's Comus.

Next, she performed at Marylebone Gardens, in the early 1770s. She moved from London to Dublin, Ireland. Woodham married a name with the surname Smith. She had a daughter. Mr. Smith died, and his widow married a man with the surname Woodham. Eventually, they divorced. She lived with her daughter's family. Mrs. Woodham was said to have died of suffocation and burns in a fire at Astley's theatre on 2 February 1803. She heard the alarm of fire and came to the door (or window) where egress awaited but returned for a dress or to secure the receipts of the house for the last two nights, which were in her charge. She died of smoke inhalation. Her body was burnt with little remaining for burial. Her surname, which appeared as "Woodham" in the Gentleman's Magazine, was given in the Monthly Mirror as "Woodman", and it was noted that a similar actress named "Mrs Woodman" was, mistakenly, the deceased.

There was an actress "from England" called Mrs Woodham performing in Philadelphia in 1806 who was employed for her comical and musical skills.
