= Leucothoe =

Leucothoe may refer to:

- Leucothoe (mythology), the name of several characters in Greek mythology.
- Leucothoe (plant), a genus in the family (Ericaceae)
- Leucothoe (crustacean), a genus of amphipod crustaceans
- Leucothoé, an early work by the Irish playwright Isaac Bickerstaffe
- Leucothoe (poem), a poem by Giovanni Pascoli
