= George Pinto =

George Pinto may refer to:

- George Pinto (composer) (1785-1806), English composer.
- George Pinto (banker) (1929-2018)
