= Halia of Rhodes =

Ancient Greek figure from Rhodes

Halia
- Abode: Rhodes

Genealogy
- Parents: Thalassa
- Siblings: Telchines
- Consort: Poseidon
- Children: Rhodos and six sons

In Greek mythology, Halia (Ancient Greek: Ἁλία, romanized: Halía, lit. 'dweller in the sea', also spelled Ἁλίη) was a woman who according to Rhodian tradition became the sea-goddess Leucothea. She was a lover of the sea-god Poseidon to whom she bore seven children.

== Family ==
Halia was a daughter of Thalassa (the personification of the sea), and sister to the Telchines; it is not clear who her father was, if she had one at all.

The sea-god Poseidon fell in love with Halia, and fathered six sons and one daughter, Rhodos, on her, who later became the wife of the sun-god Helios and the one after whom the island of Rhodes was named.

== Mythology ==
According to the account by Diodorus Siculus, Halia's brother the Telchines nurtured the infant Poseidon, entrusted on them by his mother Rhea. When Poseidon grew up, he fell in love with his tutors' sister Halia, and had six sons and one daughter by her.

Years later, while the goddess Aphrodite was journeying from Cythera to Cyprus, she attempted to make a stop at Rhodes. However, the sons of Poseidon and Halia, who were arrogant and insolent men, drove the goddess away. In anger, Aphrodite cursed them with madness so they raped their own mother, Halia, and committed many acts of violence upon the natives. When Poseidon learnt of this, he buried his children deep beneath the soil as Halia cast herself at the sea. She then became the goddess Leucothea, who is usually in other traditions identified with the Theban queen Ino instead, the daughter of king Cadmus. She was worshipped as a divine being by the Rhodians.

== See also ==
- Jocasta
- Aegypius
- Tethys
