= Isabella Vincent =

British singer and former milkmaid

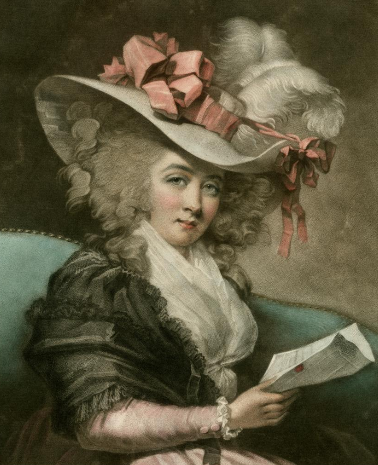
- Mrs Mills by George Engleheart engraved by John Raphael Smith
- Born: Isabella Burchell; 1734
- Died: 9 June 1802 (aged 67–68); London
- Other name: Mrs Mills
- Occupation: singer
- Employer: Vauxhall Gardens
- Spouse(s): Vincent, John Mills

Isabella Burchell, who became known as Isabella Vincent and Mrs Mills (1734 – 9 June 1802) was a British milkmaid and later singer at Vauxhall Gardens for ten years.

== Life ==
She was said to have been a milkmaid who was trained as a singer at the expense of Jonathan Tyers and brought to London from near his estate in Surrey in 1751. Tyers owned the Denbies estate in Surrey and he had heard her near there. Tyers had a long lease on the Vauxhall Gardens and she was employed there for ten seasons.

In 1759 she appeared to great success in The Beggar's Opera at Vauxhall Gardens. The following year she appeared again at Vauxhall alongside Charlotte Brent, which invited comparisons between them in the press. After she travelled by coach with the philosopher Jeremy Bentham that year, Bentham boasted of meeting the "famous" Mrs Vincent who had entertained him with songs within the stagecoach. Vincent had her first role on the stage when David Garrick put on the Beggar's Opera at Drury Lane and cast Vincent in the leading role of Polly.

Vincent continued to appear in the theatre where she was not noted for her acting, although her singing was well received and she was cast in two operas. Every year she would take the lead in the Beggars's Opera until her final season in 1767 when she sang the part once as a widow, as her husband had died the previous year. She remarried in 1767 to John Mills, a sea captain for the East India Company. They had met at Marylebone Gardens where she had been singing, each summer, since 1864.

She would appear as "Mrs Mills".

Vincent went to India with her daughter and her last husband but died in London in 1802.

== Private life ==
On 25 August 1755 she married Richard Vincent who led the orchestra at Vauxhall. They had three daughters, of whom Elizabeth (born 1757) was the only survivor. Richard died in 1766. She and her second husband, John Mills, had another son John Wedderburn Samuel Thomas Mills who was baptized and died in Calcutta in 1769.
