= Mrs Woodman =

Mrs Woodman (fl. 1768–1789) was a singer and actress in Edinburgh, Covent Garden and Astley's Amphitheatre.

== Life ==
Mrs Woodman is known for her brief career and because she was confused with another actor and singer known as Mrs Woodham. This Mrs Woodman appeared in Edinburgh in 1768. One of her performances was as Polly in the Beggar's Opera and confusingly the actress who would eventually become Mrs Woodham was in the same company and she played Dolly Trull.

This Mrs Woodham, the one who played Polly, went on to appear at Covent Garden in 1770-1771 but her acting was considered unremarkable. In September 1773 she performed two benefit performances at Marylebone Gardens which must have been about the time that her husband, a school teacher, died. In 1775 she made a successful public appeal to avoid being imprisoned for debt as she had five children to feed.

By 1775 she was at Astley's Amphitheatre where she remained for four years. In September 1803 Astley's Amphitheatre had a large fire and there was later confusion as to whether it was our Mrs Woodman who died, but it is thought to be the similar sounding Mrs Woodham.
