= Geoffrey Thomas Dunn =

Geoffrey Thomas Dunn, referred to as Geoffrey Dunn, (13 December 1902 – 6 September 1981) was an English tenor, actor, librettist, director and translator whose wide-ranging career encompassed opera and operetta, theatre and film.

== Career ==
Dunn took part in a broadcast of English madrigals for the BBC, subsequently aired on French radio in November 1925, with Kathleen Vincent, Mona Benson and Frederick Woodhouse. He sang with Nigel Playfair's company at the Lyric Hammersmith, participating in rarely heard works such as Idomeneo. He took part in the Radford sisters' Falmouth Opera Singers productions at the Polytechnic Hall: the title role in Samson in 1929, Sextus in La clemenza di Tito (also seen in London), the title role in Idomeneo (likewise) and Belshazzar in 1946.

Having produced Bastien and Bastienne at the Royal Academy of Music in London, he and Frederick Woodhouse, without any backing in 1930 formed the Intimate Opera Company which revived several 18th-century English operas, with limited resources, and Dunn singing tenor, Woodhouse baritone, and Margaret Ritchie soprano. In the US he was seen as Thomas in Thomas and Sally on Broadway at the Little Theatre on 4 January 1938 with the Intimate Opera Company, and appeared in other plays on Broadway that month, including Peggy Perkins, The Brickdust Man, True Blue, or The Press Gang, and Don Quixote; he arranged or translated several of them. At the Royal Academy of Music in 1935 he was responsible for stage management, costumes and scenery for The Magic Flute and the translation of Mozart and Salieri, conducted by William Alwyn and the following year directed Falstaff at the Royal Academy, conducted by John Barbirolli. In 1936 he also appeared in the first performances in Cambridge and London of Vaughan Williams's The Poisoned Kiss; and later the composer agreed for the conductor to approach Dunn about revising the libretto for a putative radio broadcast in 1938.

He appeared in early British television broadcasts of operas, such as Dibdin's Lionel and Clarissa and Méhul's Le jeune sage et le vieux fou in 1937. Before the Second World War, Dunn provided librettos for Brian Easdale and Herbert Murrill, and later for English Eccentrics, Julius Caesar Jones and Dunstan and the Devil for Malcolm Williamson.

Dunn's many translations include Béatrice et Bénédict and Les pêcheurs de perles, La Calisto and Der Tenor, but his most notable achievement was in Sadler's Wells operetta productions, Offenbach (Orpheus in the Underworld, La Vie parisienne, La belle Hélène and Bluebeard) and Johann Strauss in the early 1960s. Later that decade he provided a translation for the Gielgud–Jarman production of Don Giovanni which opened the Sadler's Wells company's move to the London Coliseum. Grove commented that his "lines are always musically phrased, apt for stage effect and endlessly witty in rhyme and pun". Jacobs gives an example from La Belle Hélène of a "superbly punning line (wittier than the original)", 'Why does the downfall of virtue divert you so much?' ([Dis-moi, Vénus], quel plaisir trouves-tu ~ À faire ainsi cascader la vertu ?). In an article about his work on Murder in the Cathedral in 1962 Dunn set out the three objectives "of the highest importance in making an English version of any opera"; that "the words should be as easy as possible to sing, with the vowels at the extremities of the registers as near a possible to the vowels of the original stresses and note-values should be scrupulously retained, in recitative as well as arioso; and that they should never be altered or modified except when there is no other way to fulfil the demands of the third objective".

He also provided translations for twentieth century operas such as King Roger and Saul and David. For his translation of Pizzetti's Assassinio nella cattedrale in 1962, he first discussed his approach with T. S. Eliot, on whose play Alberti Castelli's libretto had been based, and described the result as "Re-translated into English by Geoffrey Dunn who has used, wherever possible, T. S. Eliot's own wording.".

As a producer and director his work included Antony Hopkins's Lady Rohesia at Sadler's Wells in 1947, Don Giovanni in 1947 and Dido and Aeneas in early 1951. He translated and produced Il trionfo dell'onore by Alessandro Scarlatti at the Fortune Theatre, conducted by Stanford Robinson with April Cantelo and Marjorie Thomas among the cast. He translated and produced Gluck's La rencontre imprévue for a broadcast on the Third Programme on 30 October 1955 conducted by Charles Mackerras with Alexander Young, Ian Wallace, Rupert Davies and Bruce Boyce among the cast.

Dunn appeared with the Players' Theatre company during World War 2, where his songs included 'I don't mind Flies', 'My Son My Son' and 'That is Love'. In 1942 he appeared with Vida Hope in a melodrama The Streets of London. He appeared alongside Ian Wallace and Alastair Sim in James Bridie's The Forrigan Reel at Sadler's Wells in 1944. Shakespearean roles include Malvolio in a television production of Twelfth Night starring Barbara Lott as Viola in 1950, and the Archbishop of Canterbury in an audio recording of Henry V (1967) with Ian Holm as the king. He gave up singing to concentrate on acting but appeared as Cardinal Pirelli in the original production of the musical Valmouth in 1958.

Among his screen roles Dunn played a hairdresser in Dickinson's Queen of Spades of 1949, Terpnos in Quo Vadis in the MGM blockbuster from 1951, the Archbishop of Canterbury in the 1964 TV adaptation of Victoria Regina, and Lory in the 1966 Jonathan Miller adaptation of Alice in Wonderland.
