= The Romp (play) =

The Romp is a 1767 play, a comic afterpiece, which was derived from Love in the City by Isaac Bickerstaffe.

The piece centred on the most popular character of the original play, Priscilla Tomboy, also known as "Miss Prissy".

== Original cast ==
=== Drury Lane ===
- Young Cockney by James William Dodd (Mr. Dodd)
- Barnacle by Mr. Suett
- Old Cockney by Mr. Fawcett
- Captain Sightly by William Barrymore (Mr. Barrymore)
- Priscilla Tomboy by Dorothy Jordan (Mrs. Jordan)
- Penelope by Miss Stageldoir
- Miss La Blond by Miss Barnes

=== Haymarket (1787) ===
- Young Cockney by Mr. Meadows
- Barnacle by Mr. Booth
- Old Cockney by Mr. Barrett
- Captain Sightly by Mr. Wright
- Priscilla Tomboy by Miss George
- Penelope by Miss Burnet
- Miss La Blond by Miss Brangin
