= Leucothoe (poem) =

Leucothoe is an 1883 poem in Latin by Giovanni Pascoli, rediscovered and published in 2012. The work takes the form of a mythological and erotic epyllion of 144 verses.

== Editorial history ==
Pascoli composed the poem in 1883 when, in financial difficulties, he heard about the Certamen poeticum Hoeufftianum, a prize awarded annually by the Royal Netherlands Academy of Arts and Sciences in Amsterdam. He sent the composition, however, without knowing the rules of the competition, nor did he include his name, so he received no news from the academy and the work was lost in the Dutch archives.

In 2012, the philologist Vincenzo Fera tracked down the poem at the Noord-Hollands Archief in Haarlem, finding the original text in its entirety, on three sheets of paper handwritten by the author, and published it in December 2012.

== Title ==
The name of the protagonist, Leucothoe, does not seem to draw so much from Ovid's Leucothoe as from the myth of the goddess Leucothea.

== Contents ==
Leucothoe is the daughter of a marine divinity and a mortal. Her semi-divine nature will induce her to seek a rapprochement with the Nereids nymphs, causing her isolation from mortals and thus avoiding the courtship of her peers: her love is in fact reserved for a sea deity, who will make her his.
