= Thomas and Sally =

Opera by Thomas Arne

- Opera by Thomas Arne
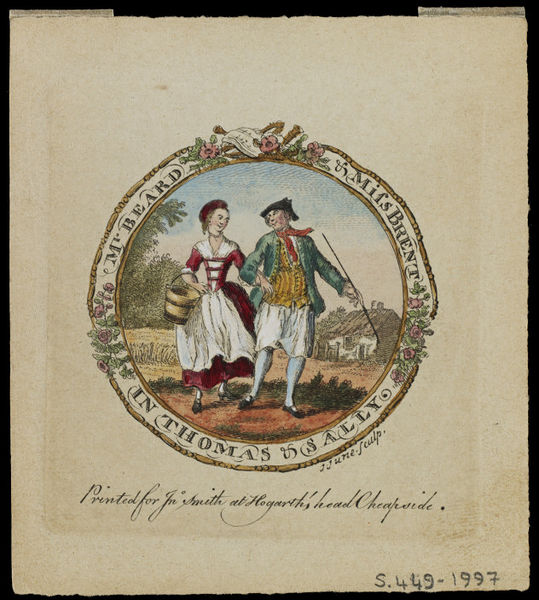
- John Beard and Charlotte Brent in Thomas and Sally
- Librettist: Isaac Bickerstaffe
- Premiere: 28 November 1760; Covent Garden theatre, London

Thomas and Sally (also known as The Sailor's Return) is a dramatic pastoral opera in two acts by the composer Thomas Arne with an English libretto by Isaac Bickerstaffe. The opera was meant to be performed as an "after piece", which is a short musical work to be performed after a spoken play.

== Performance history ==
The opera was initially scheduled to premiere in October 1760 but was postponed due to the death of King George II. The opera eventually premiered on 28 November 1760 at the Theatre Royal, Covent Garden and enjoyed a successful run. Thomas and Sally is one of only a few works by Arne that were not destroyed in the disastrous fire at Covent Garden in 1808 and it has occasionally been revived during the past century.

The opera made its Broadway debut at the Little Theatre on 4 January 1938 by the Intimate Opera Company with Geoffrey Dunn as Thomas, Winifred Radford as Sally, and Frederick Woodhouse as the Squire. Thomas and Sally also has the distinction of being one of the first operas recreated for television. The BBC made a television production of the opera in 1937 with Joan Collier as Sally, Vivienne Chatterton as Dorcas, Henry Wendon as Thomas, and Dennis Noble as the Squire.

== Musical analysis ==
Thomas and Sally is about fifty minutes in length and is notable in that it is the first English comic opera to be sung throughout. The orchestration is also unusual for a lighter opera of this period, as Arne included clarinets in the score which were usually only used in tragic pieces. The nautical themes in the libretto led Arne to compose a sturdy score that includes a boisterous hunting song for the Squire. Sally's songs are written in an opera buffa style.

== Roles ==
Roles, voice types, premiere cast
Role	Voice type	Premiere cast, 28 November 1760 Conductor: Thomas Arne
Sally, a milkmaid	soprano	Charlotte Brent
Thomas, a sailor	baritone	
A Squire, infatuated with Sally	tenor	William Mattocks
Dorcas, a matron	mezzo-soprano	Vernon

== Synopsis ==
Act 1
Sally is distraught over the impending loss of Thomas who is about to embark on a sea voyage which will separate them for a long time. The lovers tearfully say goodbye to one another. Meanwhile, the squire is infatuated with Sally but has not pursued her because of Thomas. Now that Thomas is gone, the squire decides to try to woo Sally under the encouragement of Dorcas. Sally spurns the squire. Seeing that he has failed, Dorcas tries to help him out by advising Sally to celebrate her youth. Sally, however, remains firm in her devotion to Thomas.
Act 2
The squire and Dorcas continue to plot together in the attempt to woo Sally. Just as it seems like Sally may give in, Thomas returns to rescue Sally and the two declare that they will marry.
