= Thomas Pinto =

Thomas Pinto (1728–1783) was a British violinist, who led notable London orchestras of the day.

== Life ==
Pinto's father, Guglielmo Pinto, left a high-ranking position in Naples for political reasons, and settled in England; he married, and he and his wife Mary had three sons, of whom Thomas was baptised in London on 2 February 1728.

As a child Thomas Pinto played the violin well, and aged 11 he could play the concertos of Arcangelo Corelli; he was leading important concerts before he was twenty. He was able to play music at sight so well that he neglected practicing. He became more ambitious when impressed by the success of Felice Giardini, an Italian violinist who came to England in 1750 and led the orchestra of Italian opera in London. Pinto became leader when Giardini was unavailable. He was for a period leader of the orchestra of the Drury Lane theatre and at Vauxhall Gardens.

In 1769 he became joint owner, with a Mr Troughton, of Marylebone Gardens, and he led the orchestra there. Because of a wet summer, the business venture failed, and Pinto moved to Scotland; in 1773 he moved to Dublin where he led the orchestra of the Smock Alley Theatre. He died in Dublin in December 1782. The Dublin Evening Post described his passing thus: Deaths: On Friday the 6th inst., Mr Thomas Pinto, well-known in the polite world for his great knowledge of music and superior excellence as a performer on the violin.

== Family ==
In 1745 he married Sybilla Gronemann, a German singer; they had several children including Julia, the mother of the composer and pianist George Pinto. After his first wife's death Pinto married in 1766 the singer Charlotte Brent, and they had seven children. She had been a pupil and mistress of the composer Thomas Arne, and was a performer at Vauxhall Gardens.
