= Isaac Bickerstaffe =

Irish playwright and librettist

- Born: Isaac John Bickerstaffe; 26 September 1733; Dublin, Ireland
- Died: after 1808
- Occupations: Playwright, librettist
- Notable work: Thomas and Sally (1761); Love in a Village (1762); The Maide of the Mill (1765)

Isaac John Bickerstaffe or Bickerstaff (26 September 1733 – after 1808) was an Irish playwright and librettist.

== Early life ==
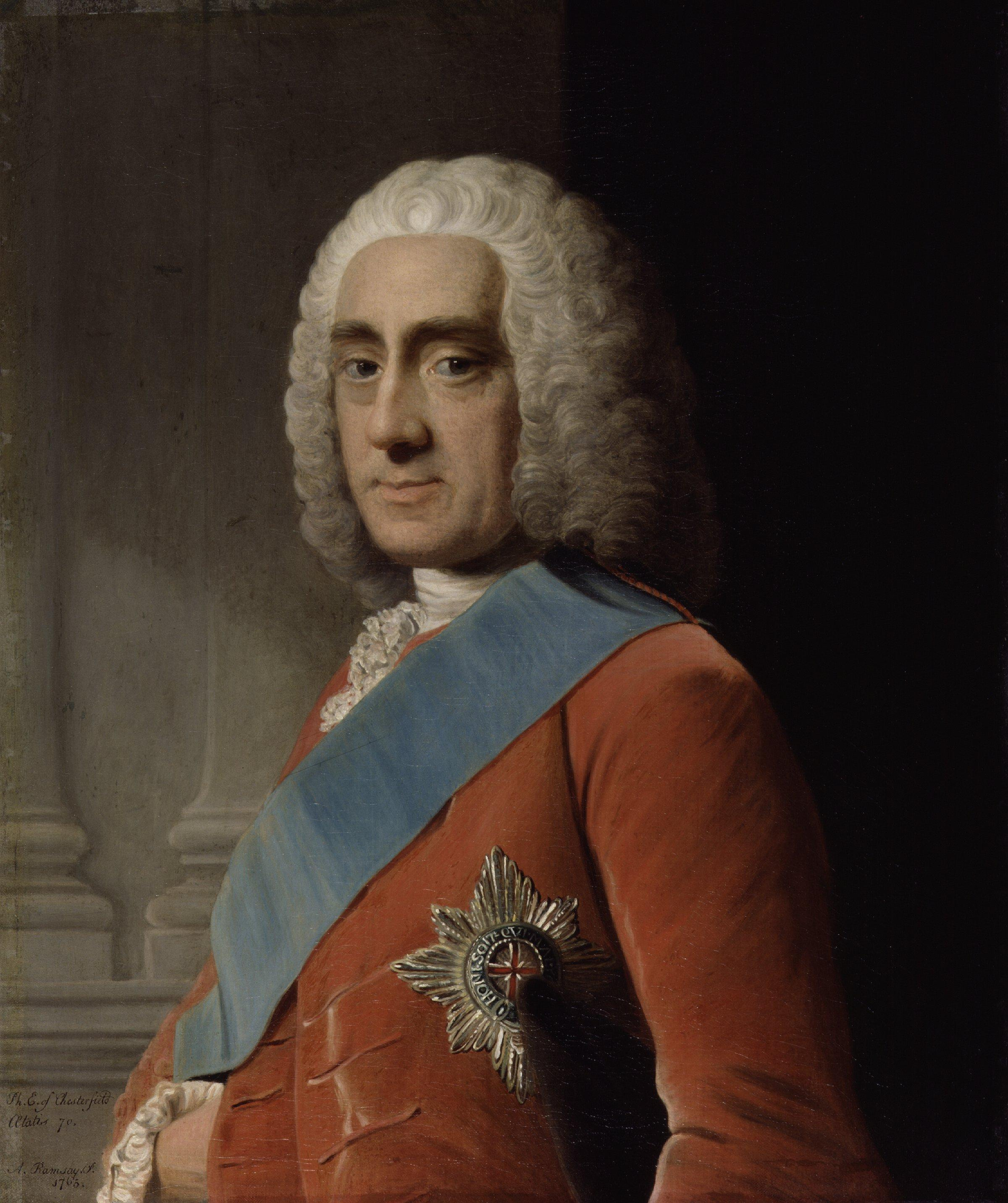
Bickerstaff's first patron Lord Chesterfield who served as Lord Lieutenant of Ireland

Isaac John Bickerstaff was born in Dublin, on 26 September 1733, where his father John Bickerstaff held a government position overseeing the construction and management of sports fields including bowls and tennis courts. The office was abolished in 1745, and he received a pension from the government for the rest of his life.

In his early years, Isaac was a page to Lord Chesterfield, the Lord Lieutenant of Ireland, which allowed him to mix with fashionable Dublin society. When Chesterfield was replaced in the position in 1745 he arranged for Isaac to be given a commission in the army. In October 1745, Bickerstaff joined the 5th Regiment of Foot known as the Northumberland Fusiliers. He served as an ensign until 1746, when he was promoted to lieutenant. The regiment, under the command of Alexander Irwin, was on the Irish Establishment and was based in Kinsale in Ireland. In March 1755, the regiment was moved to Bristol in England. Having recently come into some money, Isaac resigned his commission in August and went on half-pay.

He intended to become a writer, but his first work was published but not performed and he soon ran into financial difficulties. By March 1758, he was so short of money that he joined the Marine Corps as a lieutenant stationed at Plymouth and served through the Seven Years' War. In 1763, following the Treaty of Paris he was honourably discharged as the Corps was reduced in size.

== Success ==
Bickerstaff had first arrived in London in 1755 and worked as a playwright. His years growing up in Dublin, a cultural hub at the time, had greatly influenced his views on writing and the arts. He developed a view that the English language was totally unsuited for singing operas in, however skilled the composer, and that Italian was the natural language. Later in life, he was to challenge this view.

In London he initially struggled, and his first work Leucothoé (1756), a dramatic poem, was a failure. While critically well received by two reviewers, it had not been set to music and performed and was widely ignored. Bickerstaff also hurt his chances of success by publicly criticising David Garrick, the leading actor-manager of the era, for "barbarity" in his recent attempts to set Shakespeare plays to music. These setbacks forced him to return to military service.

In 1760, while still serving in the marine corps, Bickerstaff collaborated with Thomas Arne, the leading British composer, on a light opera Thomas and Sally which was an enormous success. It is possible that Bickerstaff simply wrote the play and approached Arne with it or sent it to the Covent Garden Theatre where he was working. It had its opening night at Covent Garden on 28 November 1760. The play was performed repeatedly in London and soon spread around Britain and across the British Empire. It was also performed in Dublin, Philadelphia and Kingston, Jamaica. They subsequently worked together on Judith, an oratorio first performed at Drury Lane in February 1760. He went on to produce many successful comedies based on Marivaux and other French playwrights and opera librettos.

In 1762 he and Arne wrote Love in a Village, considered the first English comic opera.

His The Maide of the Mill (1765), with music by Samuel Arnold and others, was also very successful. Bickerstaffe also wrote bowdlerised versions of plays by William Wycherley and Pedro Calderon de la Barca. His Love in the City (1767), The Padlock (1768), based on "The Jealous Husband" in Cervantes' Novelas (this included the character Mungo, a negro servant played by Dibdin, one of the earliest comic black roles in English drama). He also wrote The Life of Ambrose Guinet (1770).

== Exile ==
In 1770, a newspaper published a false report that in a fit of despair, he had thrown himself into the sea in the south of France, and perished.

In 1772, Bickerstaffe fled to the Continent, suspected of homosexuality. The actor-producer David Garrick was implicated in the scandal by the lampoon Love in the Suds by William Kenrick. The remainder of his life seems to have been passed in penury and misery, but little is known.

However, in March 1772, it was reported that he was writing a small piece, which was to be called the Coterie, and would be performed at the Haymarket theatre that summer.

In early August 1772, it was reported that "Bickerstaff...who lately absconded for a detestable crime, died miserably a few days ago in Sussex". However this again appears to have been a false report, as records indicate he was still receiving his army half pay in 1808. "It seems he may have died soon after this."

Long after Bickerstaffe's disappearance, his colleague Charles Dibdin was frequently accused of plagiarising his songs.

== Selected works ==
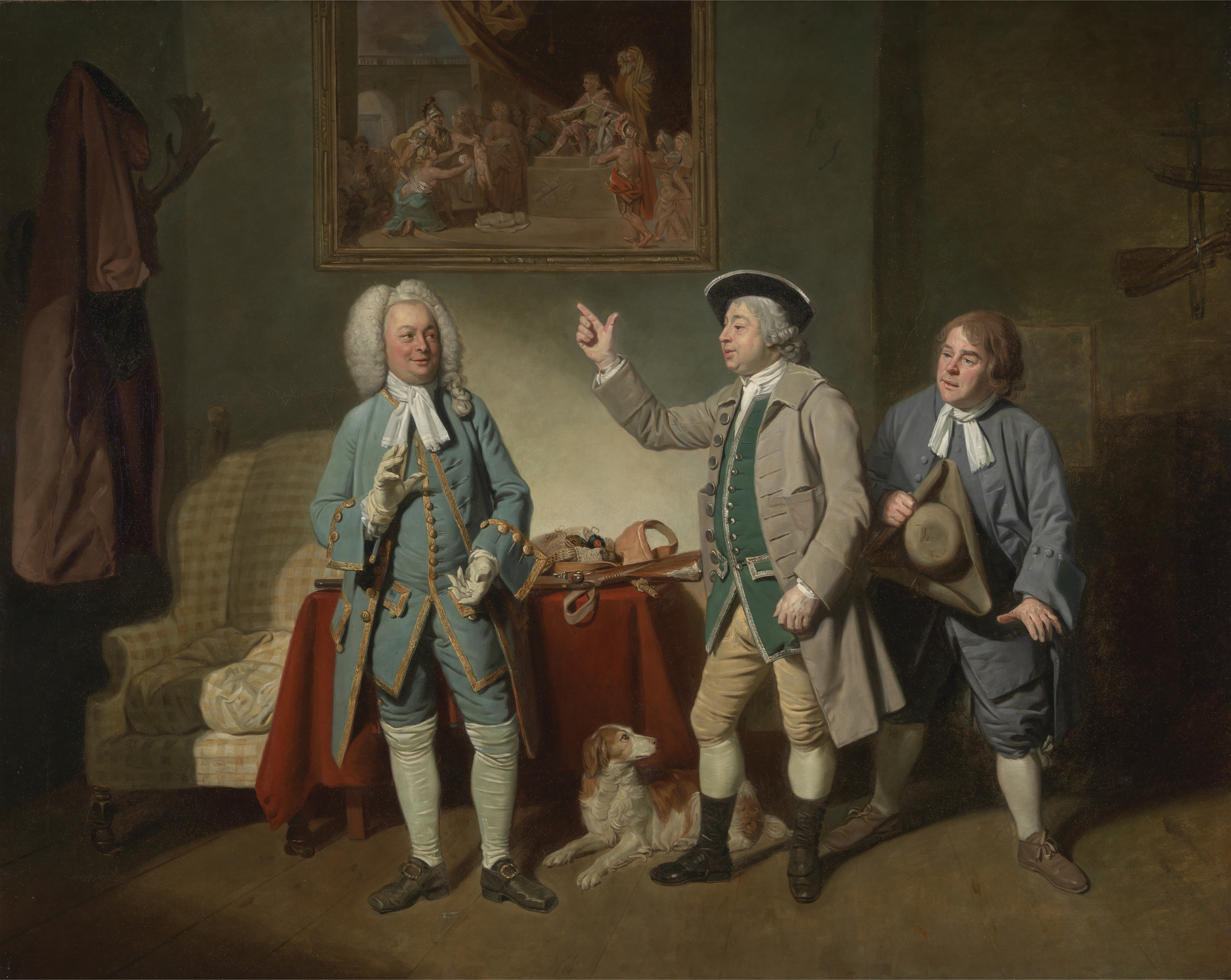
A scene from Love in a Village

- Leucothoé (1756)
- Thomas and Sally; or, The Sailor's Return (1760)
- Judith (1761)
- Love in a Village (1762)
- Daphne and Amintor (1765)
- The Maid of the Mill (1765)
- The Plain Dealer (1766)
- Love in the City (1767), better known as adapted into The Romp
- The Padlock (1768)
- The Hypocrite (1768)
- Lionel and Clarissa (1768)
- The Royal Garland (1768)
- Doctor Last in his Chariot (1769)
- The Captive (1769)
- The Recruiting Serjeant (1770)
- He Wou'd If He Cou'd; or, An Old Fool Worse Than Any (1771)
- A School for Fathers (1772)
- The Sultan; or, A Peep into the Seraglio (1775)
- The Spoil'd Child (1792) (authorship questioned)

== Bibliography ==
- Chisholm, Hugh, ed. (1911). "Bickerstaffe, Isaac" . Encyclopædia Britannica (11th ed.). Cambridge University Press.
- Cousin, John William (1910), "Bickerstaffe, Isaac", A Short Biographical Dictionary of English Literature, London: J. M. Dent & Sons – via Wikisource
- McConnell Stott, Andrew (2009). The Pantomime Life of Joseph Grimaldi. Edinburgh: Canongate Books Ltd. ISBN 978-1-84767-761-7.
- Smith, William (1955). Early Irish Stage. Oxford: Clarendon Press.
- Tasch, Peter A. (1981). The Plays of Isaac Bickerstaff. Vol. 3 vols. New York: Garland.
- Peter A. Tasch (1971). The Dramatic Cobbler: The Life and Works of Isaac Bickerstaff. Lewisburg: Bucknell UP.
- Stanford, W. B. (1984) [1976]. Ireland and the Classical Tradition. IAP.
