= Charlotte Brent =

English operatic soprano (1734–1802)

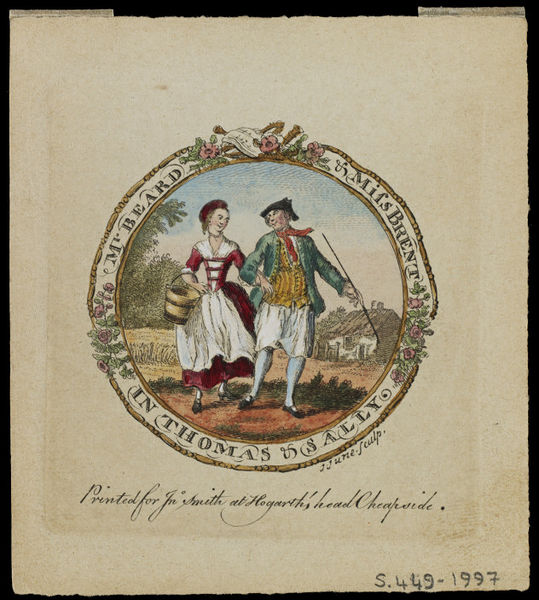
John Beard and Brent in Thomas and Sally

Charlotte Brent (17 December 1734 – 10 April 1802) was a child prodigy and celebrated soprano singer of the 18th century.

== Life ==
She was the daughter of Catherine and Charles Brent (1693–1770), who was a Handelian countertenor, and fencing master. Charlotte was a pupil and mistress of Thomas Arne (the composer of "Rule, Britannia!") and later the wife of the violinist Thomas Pinto (whom she married in 1766).

Brent was an active performer in London from 1758 until 1769, and in 1759 she appeared to great success in The Beggar's Opera at Vauxhall Gardens. The following year she appeared again at Vauxhall alongside Isabella Vincent which invited comparison in the press. Brent was noted at the time for her bravura singing and her neat, distinct, and rapid execution.

Brent was the step-grandmother of the composer and keyboard virtuoso George Pinto. Brent had a long musical partnership with Arne, often appearing in his opera productions and performing his works in concerts. Among the roles she originated in his operas were Mandane in Artaxerxes, Sally in Thomas and Sally, and Rosetta in Love in a Village.

Brent is said to have died in obscurity on 10 April 1802, aged 67.
