= Intimate Opera Company =

English opera company

The Intimate Opera Company was an English opera company based in London which specialized in performances of chamber operas. Founded in 1930 by British baritone and impresario Frederick Woodhouse, the company was established with the professed aim of reviving forgotten chamber operas of the past. Most of the company's productions were produced on a smaller scale, using only piano accompaniment, costumes, minimal sets, and no props.

The company staged its first opera in 1930, Thomas Arne's Thomas and Sally, at a small hall in Tooting. The company later took that production, along with a dozen other operas, across the Atlantic to Broadway's Little Theatre in 1938. In 1936 the company staged the world premiere of Ralph Vaughan Williams' The Poisoned Kiss at the Cambridge Arts Theatre, conducted by Cyril Rootham. In 1952 conductor and composer Antony Hopkins succeeded Woodhouse as the company's Artistic Director. Under his leadership, the company presented several more new operas, including performing the world premiere of Hopkins' opera Three's Company at the Guildhall School of Music on 21 November 1953. In 1963 Stephen Manton replaced Hopkins as artistic director, though Hopkins remained as a director and music adviser of the company.

== Recordings ==
- Henry Purcell and Thomas Arne: Masque from Timon of Athens, Decca Records, 1958
