= Leucothoé =

Leucothoé is a 1756 dramatic poem by the Irish playwright Isaac Bickerstaff. It was Bickerstaff's first published work. The plot was based on the story of the Greek Goddess Leucothea.

Leucothoé was originally intended to be a pastoral opera but Bickerstaff was unable to secure a composer to set it to music. In May 1756 it was published by Robert Dodsley at the price of 1 shilling and sixpence.

In a contemporary review in the Monthly Review, critic Ralph Griffiths generally praised the work, although he criticised the tragic ending, as "the laws of the Opera require a happy ending". While well received by the limited critics who reviewed it, the work was largely ignored both by critics and the public. This failure led Bickerstaff to rejoin the military, although he went on to have a string of successes between 1760 and 1772 often in collaboration with the composer Thomas Arne.

== Bibliography ==
Tasch, Peter A. The Dramatic Cobbler: The Life and Works of Isaac Bickerstaff. Associated University Presses, 1971.
