= Melicertes =

Greek mythological figure

- Prince of Boeotia
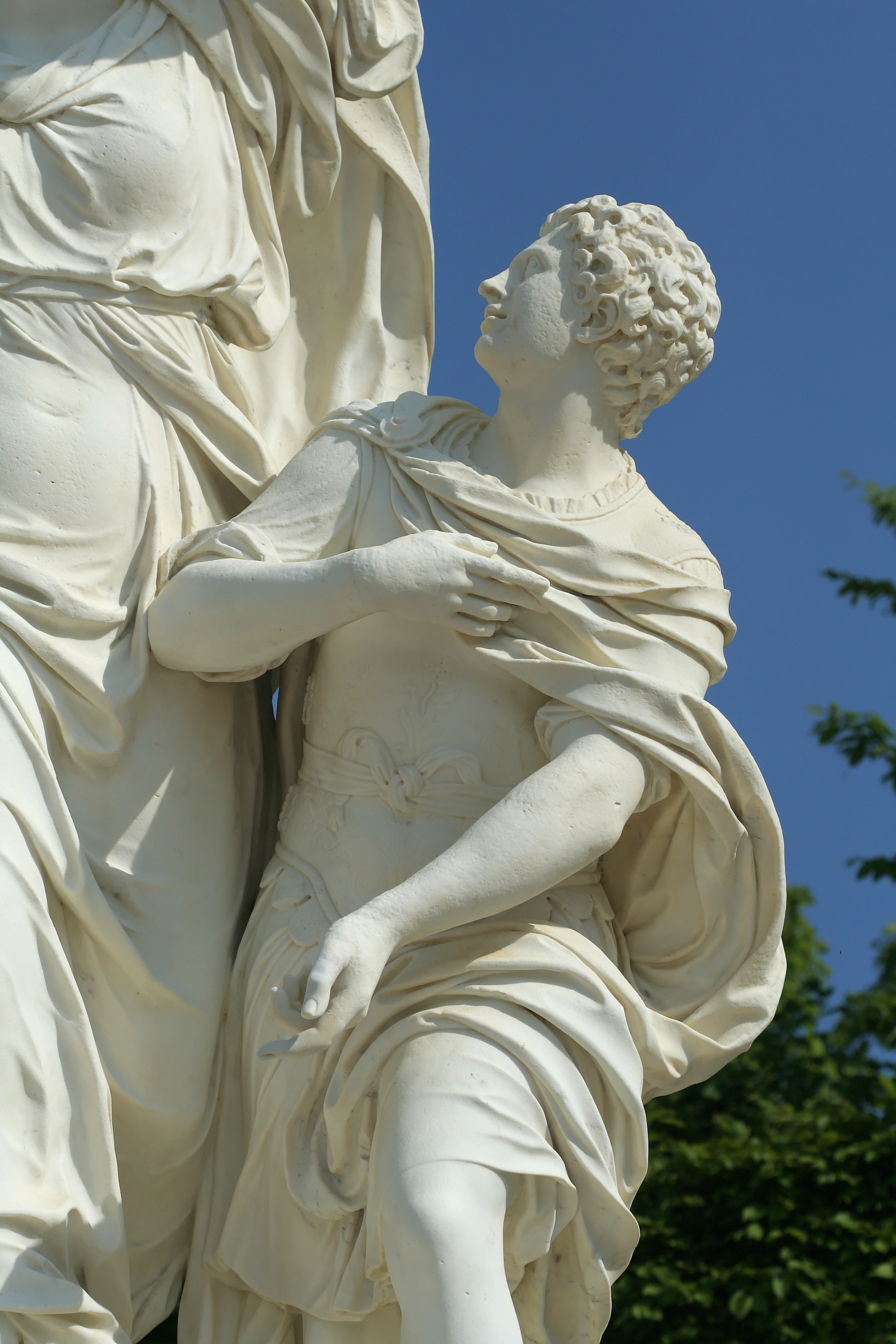
- Sculpture in the Park of Versailles depicting Ino and Melicertes
- Other names: Palaemon
- Abode: Boeotia

Genealogy
- Parents: Athamas and Ino
- Siblings: Learchus

In Greek mythology, Melicertes (Ancient Greek: Μελικέρτης, romanized: Melikértēs, sometimes Melecertes), later called Palaemon or Palaimon (Παλαίμων), was a Boeotian prince as the son of King Athamas and Ino, daughter of King Cadmus of Thebes. He was the brother of Learchus.

== Mythology ==
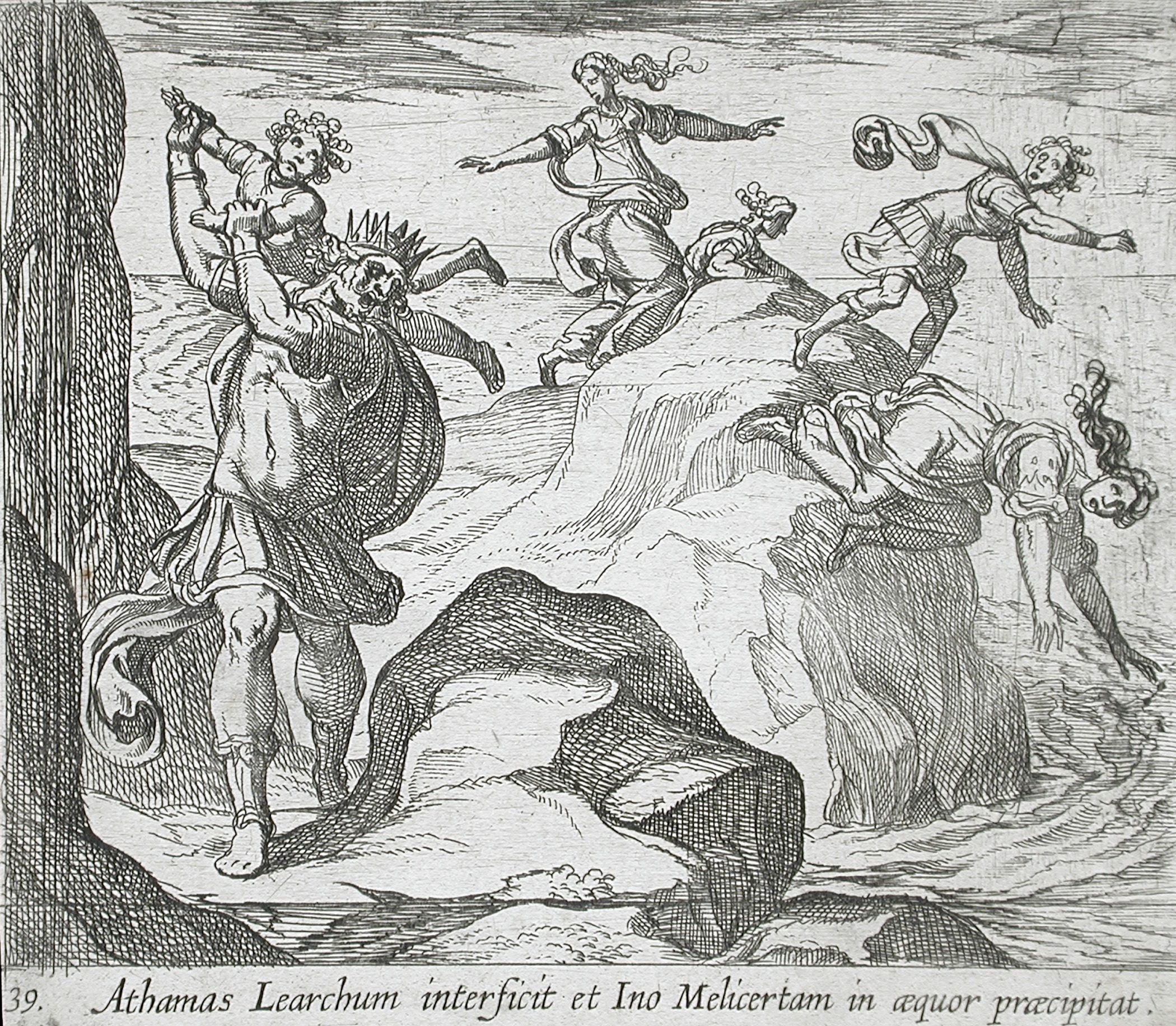
''The Insane Athamas Killing Learchus, While Ino and Melicertor Jump into the Sea'' by Wilhelm Janson (Holland, Amsterdam), Antonio Tempesta (Italy, Florence, 1555–1630) at Los Angeles County Museum of Art, Los Angeles

Ino, pursued by her husband, who had been driven mad by Hera because Ino had brought up the infant Dionysus, threw herself and Melicertes into the sea from a high rock between Megara and Corinth, and both were changed into marine deities: Ino as Leucothea, noted by Homer, Melicertes as Palaemon. The body of the latter was carried by a dolphin to the Isthmus of Corinth and deposited under a pine tree. Here it was found by his uncle Sisyphus, who had it removed to Corinth, and by command of the Nereids instituted the Isthmian Games and sacrifices in his honor.

== In literature and art ==
Palaemon appears for the first time in Euripides' Iphigeneia in Tauris, where he is already the "guardian of ships". The paramount identification in the Latin poets of the Augustan age is with Portunus, the Roman god of safe harbours, memorably in Virgil's Georgics. Ovid twice told the story of Ino's sea-plunge with Melicertes in her arms.

Ovid's treatment in his Fasti is the earliest to identify the Isthmus of Corinth as the location, though without literally naming it:

A land there is, shrunk within narrow bounds, which repels twin seas, and single in itself, is lashed by two-fold waters.

In later Latin poets there are numerous identifications of Palaemon with the sanctuary at the Isthmus, where no archaeological evidence was found for a pre-Augustan cult.

Hyginus states both that Ino cast herself into the sea with her younger son by Athamas, Melicertes, and was made a goddess, and that Ino, daughter of Cadmus, killed her son Melicertes by Athamas, son of Aeolus, when she was fleeing from Athamas.

In Greco-Roman views, Palaemon is viewed as a dolphin-riding boy, or a child with a triton tail.

== Origins ==
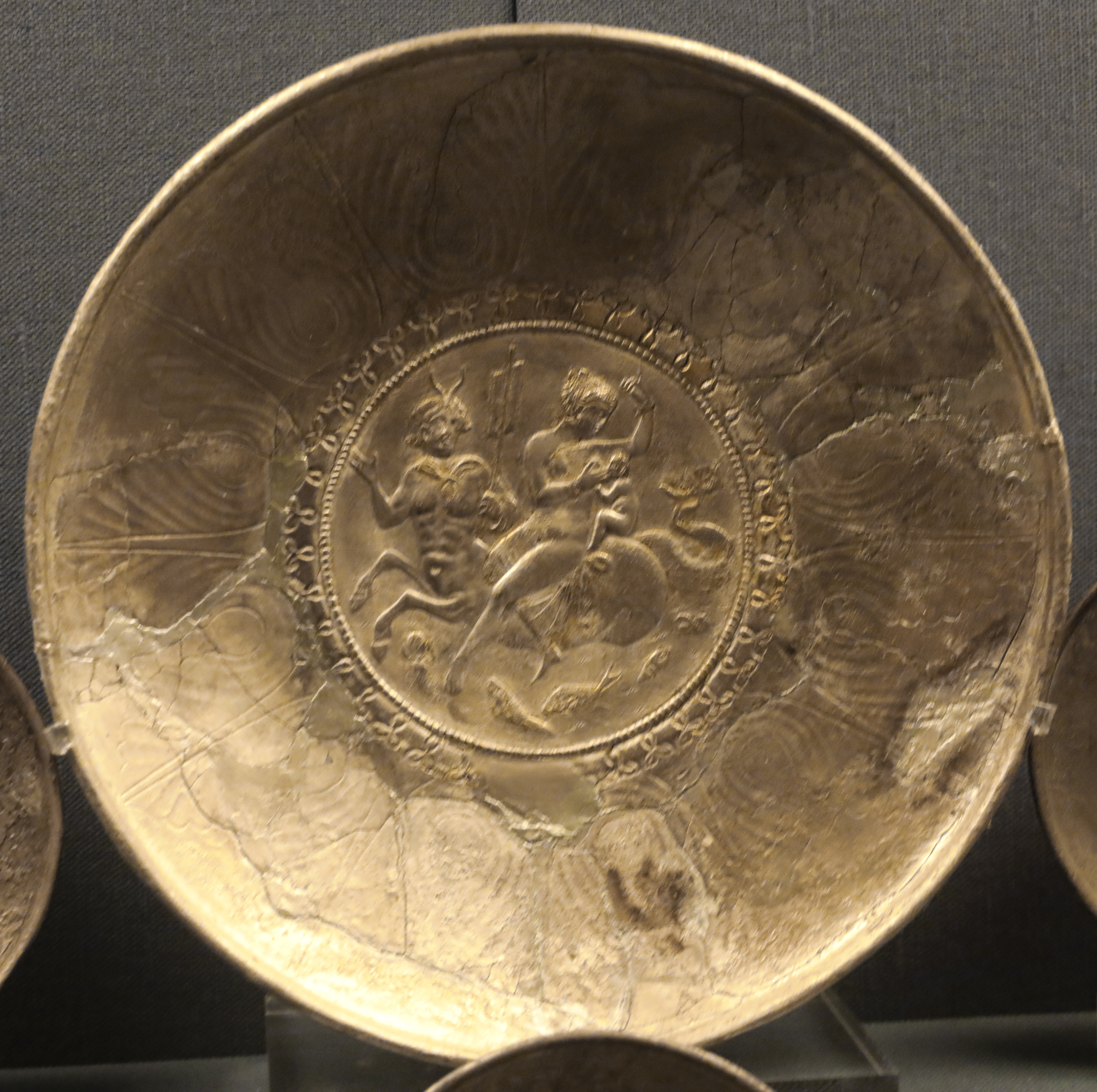
Silver plate with relief of Ino, Melicertes and an ichthyocentaur, ca. 590-650 AD, Benaki Museum.

No satisfactory origin of the name Palaemon has been given. The name means the "wrestler", and is an epithet of Heracles, with whom Melqart is identified by interpretatio graeca and referred to as the "Tyrian Herakles", but there does not appear to be any traditional connection between Heracles and Palaemon. Melicertes being Phoenician, Palaemon also has been explained as the "burning lord" (Baal-haman), but there seems little in common between a god of the sea and a god of fire. The Romans identified Palaemon with Portunus (the harbour god), and some took the name Palaemon to mean "the honey eater".

== Cult ==
In the late 2nd century CE, within the sanctuary of Poseidon at Isthmia, Pausanias saw a temple of Palaemon:

... with images in it of Poseidon, Leucothea, and Palaemon himself. There is also what is called his Holy of Holies, and an underground descent to it, where they say that Palaemon is concealed. Whosoever, whether Corinthian or stranger, swears falsely here, can by no means escape from his oath. There is also an ancient sanctuary called the altar of the Cyclopes, and they sacrifice to the Cyclopes upon it.

In company with Leucothea, Melicertes/Palaemon was widely invoked for protection from dangers at sea. (Note: several prayers of this type are contained in "book 6". The Greek Anthology. Loeb Classical Library. Vol. I. nr. 164, 223, 348; Aelius Aristides. Isthm. in Pos. 49; Nonnus. Dionysiaca. 47.354; Orphic Hymns. nr. 74, 75; all are all noted by Hawthorne (1958))

There seems considerable doubt whether or not the cult of Melicertes was of foreign, probably Phoenician, origin, and introduced by Phoenician navigators on the coasts and islands of the Aegean and Mediterranean. (Note: Will (1955) concluded that Melicertes was wholly Greek in his summary of the debate.) For the Hellenes he is a native of Boeotia.

In 1956, excavations at Isthmia under the direction of Broneer uncovered the small sanctuary of Palaemon, which eventually had a tiny Roman round temple in the Corinthian order, which appeared on coins of Corinth in the 2nd century CE; it was the successor to two previous more modest architectural phases of the sanctuary. The foundations of the temple were found to lie over the starting-line of a late-5th- or early-4th century BCE stadium. Worship was characterized by the dedication of hundreds of wheelmade oil lamps of a distinct type. A cult of Melicertes of great antiquity, possibly based on pre-Hellenic figures of Ino and Melicertes, was posited by Will, just previous to the site's discovery and refuted by Hawthorne in 1958. (Note: The archaeologists found evidence of bull sacrifice and a tub which may have been filled with water in an initiation rite for members. This further cements the connection of Melicertes with the Isthmian Games at Corinth, one of the four major athletic festivals in Greece, the most famous of which is the Olympian Games.)
