= George Pinto (composer) =

English composer

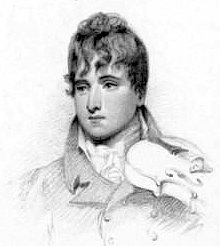
George Pinto

George Frederick Pinto (25 September 1785 – 23 March 1806) was an English composer and keyboard virtuoso.

== Life and career ==
Pinto was born in Lambeth and baptised as George Sanders. His father, Samuel Sanders (or Saunders) died young; his mother, Julia Sanders (née Pinto) was the daughter of Thomas Pinto (1714-1782), a London violinist of Italian origin. Thomas Pinto's second wife, the English singer Charlotte Brent (1735–1802), encouraged George's early musical upbringing. He used his mother's maiden name as his surname throughout his professional career.

Pinto started taking music lessons at a young age with the musician and impresario Johann Salomon. Initially, he was promoted as a prodigy on the violin. In 1793, aged 7, he performed a violin concerto by Jarnović at the Royal Amphitheatre in Dublin. In 1795 Pinto, then aged 9, made his London debut playing a violin concerto by Giovanni Mane Giornovichi at the New Lyceum in Hanover Square London. In 1796 Salomon arranged for Pinto to play a violin concerto at Signora Salvini's benefit concert. Following this, he made frequent appearances in London and other British centres, and possibly twice travelled to Paris. In 1800 he played at a concert of Salomon accompanied by John Field (to whom he later dedicated his piano sonata in C minor of 1803 - "Inscribed to his Friend John Field"). His Op. 1, three divertimenti for piano were advertised in 1801 (no copies have survived); his Op. 2, also for piano, comprising three sets of variations, was published in 1802. It is not known who taught Pinto the piano, but from this period on it would seem to have become his preferred instrument.

In January 1803 at Phillip Corri's Edinburgh concerts, Pinto took the place of an injured Corri where he "presided at the keyboard". The writer and musician Alexander Campbell wrote:

Young Pinto is not only an admirable violin player, but also a first-rate performer on the grand piano forte: to excel on two instruments so widely different from each other, is a proof of genius and unwearied application very seldom to be met with. If dissipation, and consequent idleness, do not impede him in his career, what may not the musical world expect in his riper manhood?

In 1804 Pinto began to suffer serious ill-health. This did not prevent him composing and between then and his death in 1806 appeared all his major works, including piano sonatas and violin sonatas, as well as two sets of violin duets. He also composed a number of songs and shorter piano pieces. A violin concerto written by him is now lost, although the manuscript was described in an article in the Musical World of 1850 (vol. XXV, p. 2). After breaking off a planned series of concerts in Oxford in 1805, he died in London in 1806 at the age of 20, apparently of tuberculosis. Some of his posthumous works were completed by Samuel Wesley and Joseph Woelfl.

== Legacy ==
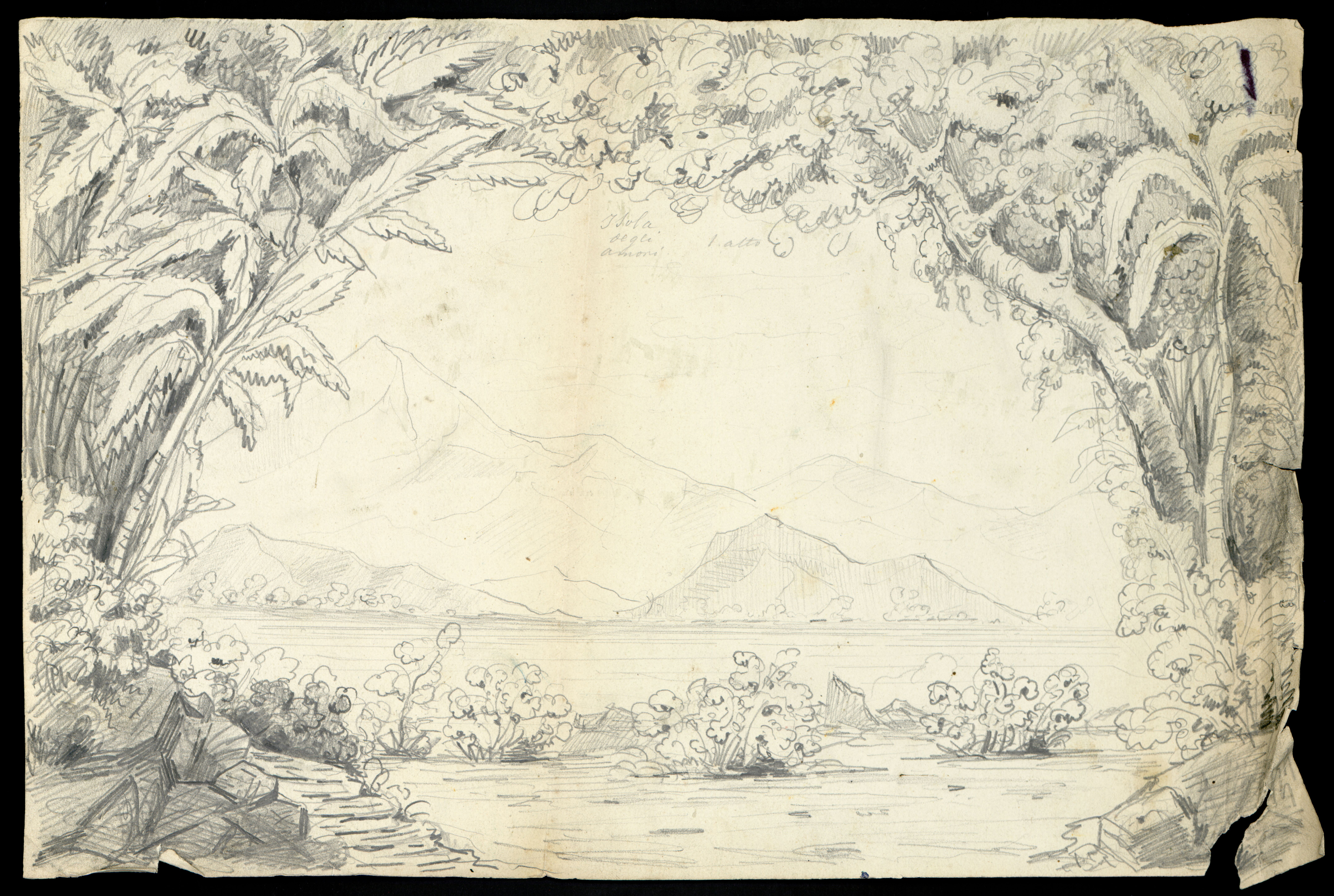
Senza titolo, set design for L'isola degli amori (1859).

It has been suggested that the numerous references to Pinto's "dissipation" by contemporaries may be covert hints about homosexuality. Tributes after his death included Salomon's comment: "If he had lived and been able to resist the allurements of society, England would have had the honour of producing a second Mozart." Samuel Wesley commented "A greater musical Genius has not been known". Other tributes came from William Ayrton and Johann Baptist Cramer.

Pinto's music was more or less forgotten after his death, although interest was shown by William Sterndale Bennett. It was not until the 1960s that interest in his works was rekindled. The musicologist Nicholas Temperley has noted that the piano works contain "astonishing anticipations of Beethoven, Schubert and even Chopin", and has opined that "only Schubert himself wrote more striking songs before the age of 20." The composer Geoffrey Bush has said of Pinto's G minor violin sonata that it is "passionate in mood, cogent in argument, and full of splendid thematic invention."

Pinto's piano sonatas have been recorded on CD by Thomas Wakefield, Ian Hobson, Riko Fukuda, Míceál O'Rourke and others, while some of his vocal works have been recorded on the Hyperion label.

Nicholas Temperley's The London Pianoforte School 1766–1860. (20 vols. London/New York: Garland, 1985) contains much of Pinto’s piano music, including the two Grand Sonatas Op.3 and the Fantasia and Sonata amongst others.
