= Thalassa =

Personification of the sea in Greek mythology

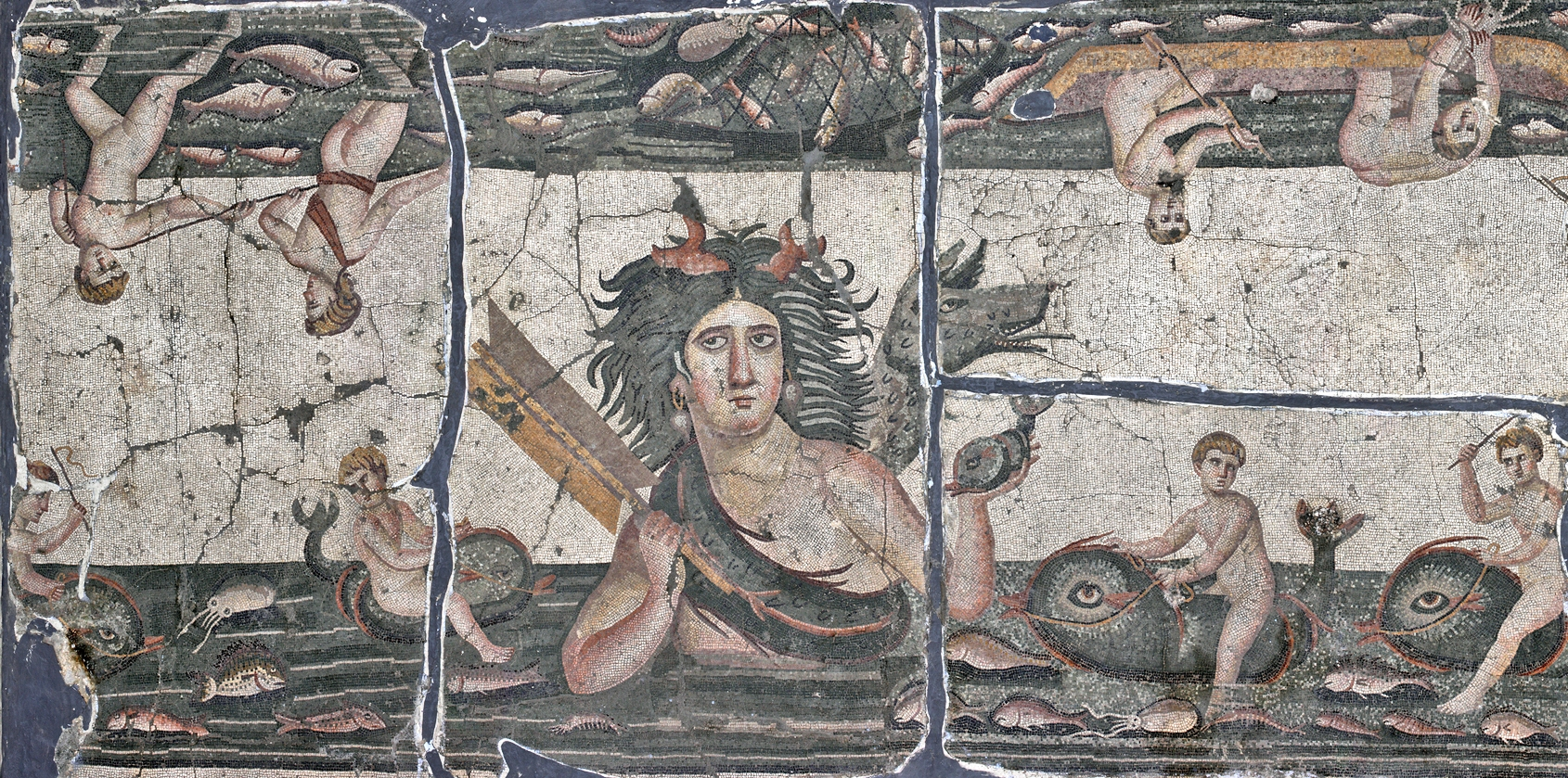
A 5th-century Roman mosaic of Thalassa, in the Hatay Archaeological Museum

In Greek mythology, Thalassa (Ancient Greek: θάλασσα, lit. 'sea') (Note: English pronunciation: /θəˈlæsə/; Attic Greek: θάλαττα, thálatta) is a divine female personification of the sea. Her name may have been of Pre-Greek origin and connected to the name of the Mesopotamian primordial sea goddess Tiamat.

== Mythology ==
According to a scholion on Apollonius of Rhodes, the fifth-century BC poet Ion of Chios had Thalassa as the mother of Aegaeon (Briareus, one of the Hecatoncheires). Diodorus Siculus (fl. 1st century BC), in his Bibliotheca historica, states that "Thalatta" is the mother of the Telchines and the sea-nymph Halia, while in the Orphic Hymn to the Sea, Tethys, who is here equated with Thalassa, is called the mother of Cypris (Aphrodite).

The Roman mythographer Hyginus (c. 64 BC – AD 17), in the preface to his Fabulae, calls Mare (Sea, another name for Thalassa) the daughter of Aether and Dies (Day), and thus the sister of Terra (Earth) and Caelus (Sky). With her male counterpart Pontus, she spawns the species of fish.

== Literature ==
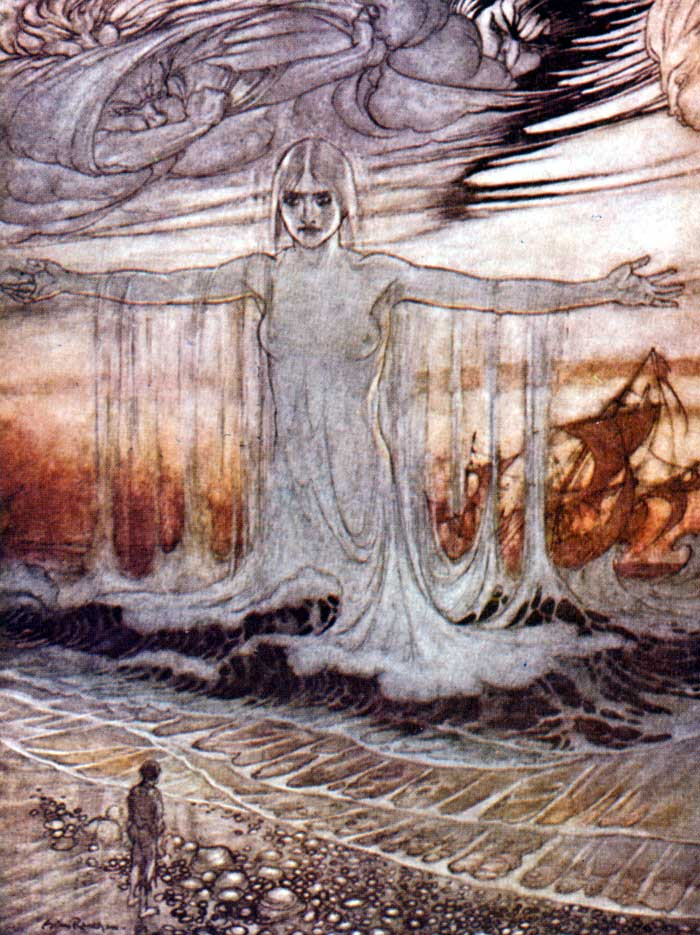
Thalassa defends herself in Aesop's fable, "The Farmer and the Sea"

Two rather similar fables are recorded by Babrius. In one, numbered 168 in the Perry Index, a farmer witnesses a shipwreck and reproaches the sea for being "an enemy of mankind". Assuming the form of a woman, she answers by blaming the winds for her turbulence. Otherwise, "I am gentler than that dry land of yours." In the other, a survivor from a shipwreck accuses the sea of treachery and receives the same excuse. But for the winds, "by nature I am as calm and safe as the land."

In yet another fable, Perry's number 412 and only recorded by Syntipas, the rivers complain to the sea that their sweet water is turned undrinkably salty by contact with her. The sea replies that if they know as much, they should avoid such contact. The commentary suggests that the tale may be applied to people who criticize someone inappropriately even though they may actually be helping them.

In the 2nd century CE, Lucian represented Thalassa in a comic dialogue with Xanthus, the god of the River Scamander, who had been attacked by a rival Greek deity for complaining that his course was being choked with dead bodies during the Trojan War. In this case he had been badly scorched and asks her to soothe his wounds.

== Art ==
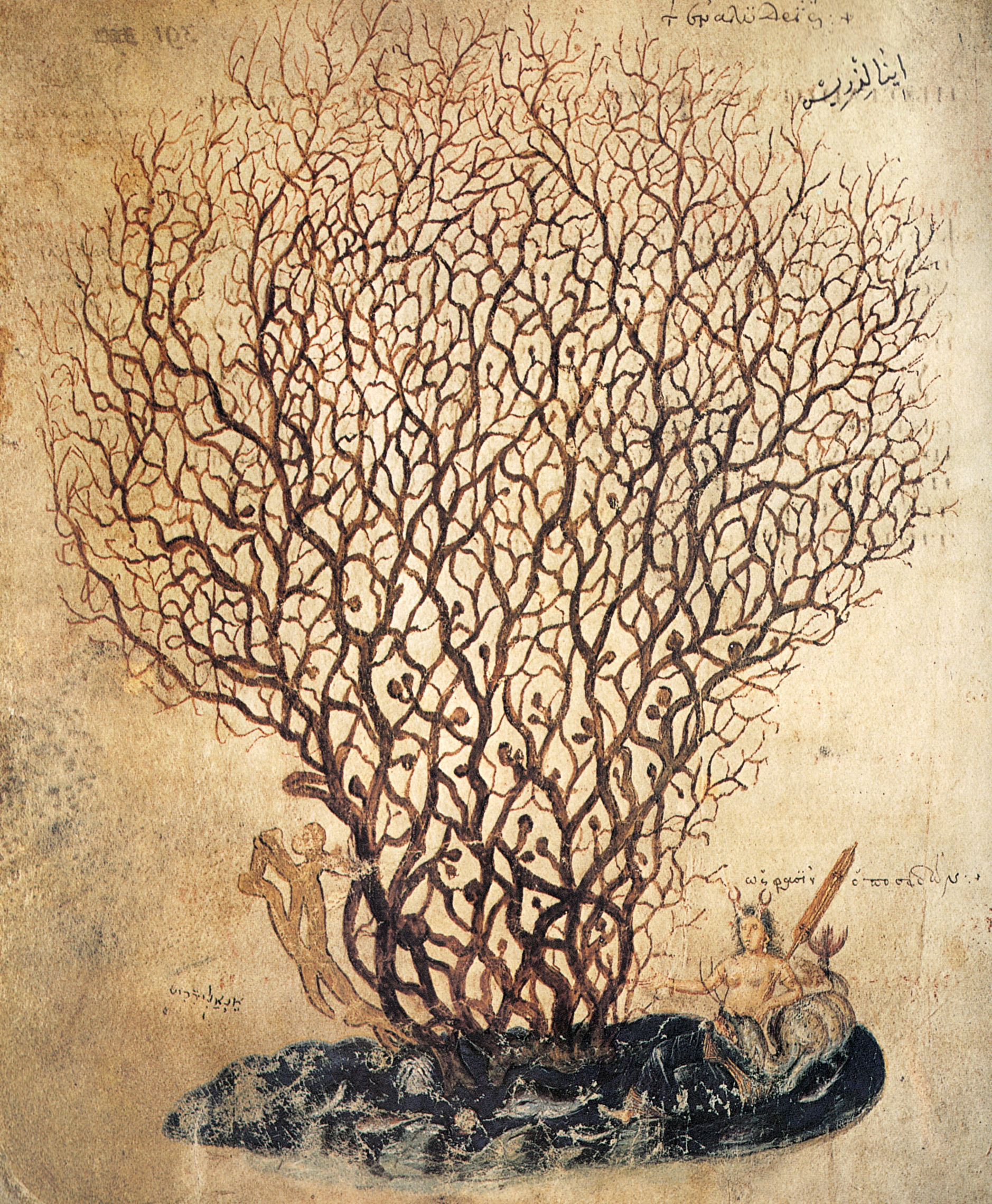
Illustration of coral with the goddess at the base, from a 6th-century medical discourse

While the sea-divinities Tethys and Oceanus were formerly represented in Roman-era mosaics, they were replaced at a later period by the figure of Thalassa, especially in Western Asia. There she was depicted as a woman clothed in bands of seaweed and half submerged in the sea, with the crab-claw horns that were formerly an attribute of Oceanus now transferred to her head. In one hand she holds a ship's oar, and in the other a dolphin.

In 2011, Swoon created a site-specific installation depicting the goddess in the atrium of the New Orleans Museum of Art. In fall 2016, the installation was erected once more in the atrium of the Detroit Institute of Arts.
