= George Pinto (banker) =

British merchant banker (1929–2018)

George Richard Pinto (11 April 1929 – 10 September 2018) was a British merchant banker with Kleinwort Benson who played a key role in that firm scooping much of the advisory work when British publicly owned companies were privatised under the government of Margaret Thatcher.

Pinto was educated at Eton and Trinity College, Cambridge. He did national service in the Coldstream Guards, and then worked for the accountancy firm Cooper Brothers. In 1958 he moved to merchant bankers Robert Benson Lonsdale, who then merged with Kleinwort, Sons & Co to form Kleinwort Benson. He was a director of Kleinwort Benson from 1968 to 1985.

Pinto donated over £300,000 to the Conservative Party between 2006-2020. The Jewish Chronicle referred to him in their obituary as an "Unapologetic Zionist, merchant banker and talented eccentric". From a Sephardic Jewish family, Pinto served as the vice president of the Anglo-Israel Association, the treasurer of the Israel Diaspora Trust and was the co-chair of governors of the Oxford Centre for Hebrew and Jewish Studies.
