= Ino (mythology) =

Boeotian queen and aunt of Dionysus

- Queen of Boeotia
- Member of the Theban Royal Family
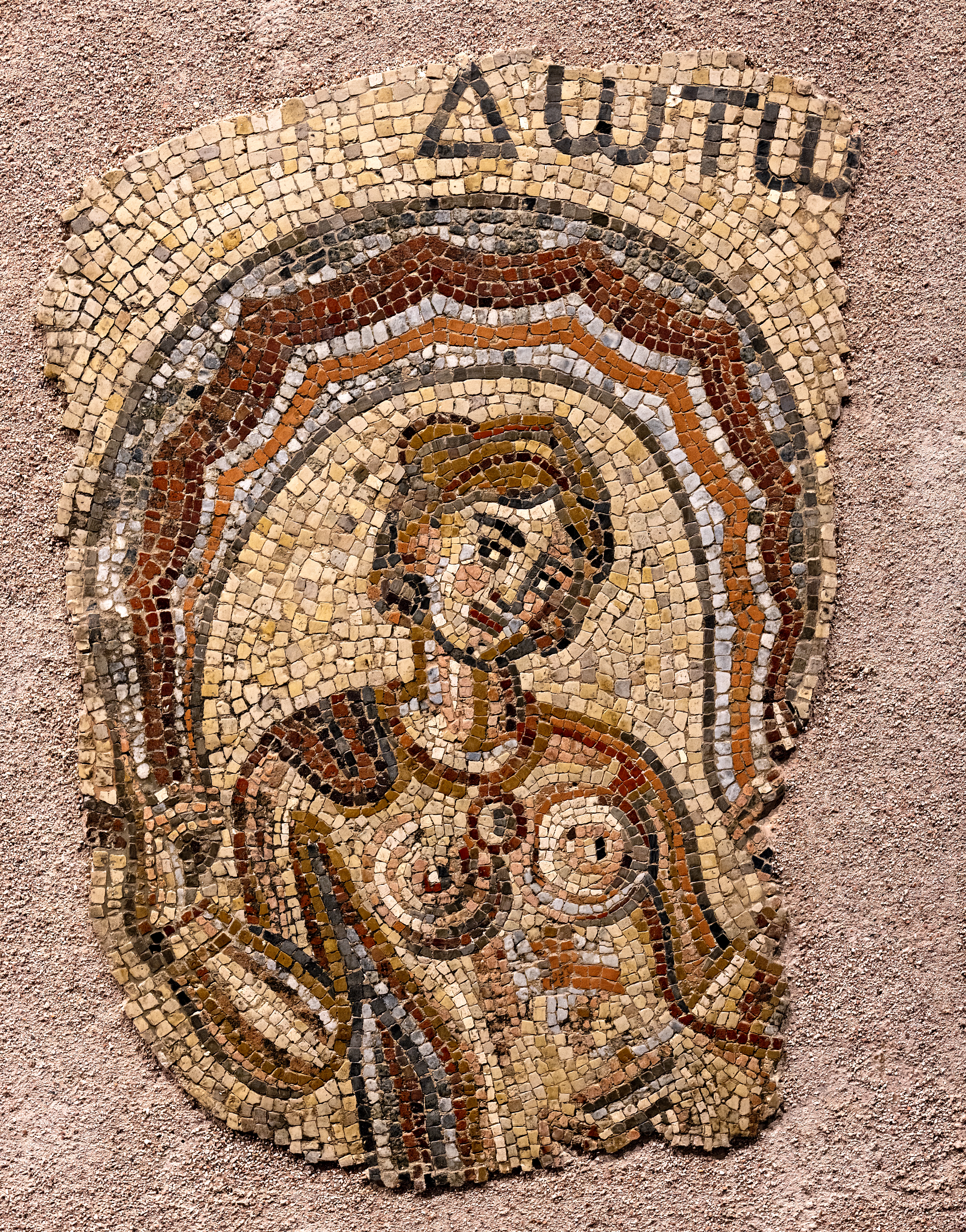
- Mosaic fragment: Ino (Δωτω, Dotô), discovered 1833 in a Roman villa in Saint-Rustice, 4th or 5th century, Saint-Raymon Museum
- Other names: Leucothea
- Abode: Thebes, later Athamantia in Boeotia

Genealogy
- Parents: Cadmus and Harmonia
- Siblings: Agave, Autonoë, Semele and Polydorus
- Consort: Athamas
- Offspring: Learchus and Melicertes

In Greek mythology, Ino (/ˈaɪnoʊ/ EYE-noh; Ancient Greek: Ἰνώ [iːnɔ̌ː]) was a Theban princess who later became a queen of Boeotia. Ino was the daughter of Cadmus, the legendary founder of Thebes, and the goddess Harmonia. Through her sister Semele, she was the aunt of Dionysus, the Greek god of wine.

After her death and transfiguration, she was worshiped as a goddess under her epithet Leucothea, the "white goddess." Alcman called her "Queen of the Sea" (Ancient Greek: θαλασσομέδουσα, romanized: thalassomédousa), which, if not hyperbole, would make her a goddess parallel to Amphitrite.

== Family ==
Ino was the second eldest daughter of King Cadmus and Queen Harmonia (Note: In Theogony she is only called "Ino", and is listed among the "glorious offspring" of unions between a mortal and a goddess. (Hesiod 1914, pp. 975 ff)) of Thebes. She had three sisters— Agave, Autonoë, and Semele— and one brother, Polydorus. Semele was the mother of the god Dionysus; Ino and her sisters helped raise the young Dionysus following Semele's death. Ino was also the aunt of Pentheus through her sister Agave, and the aunt of Actaeon through Autonoë.

Ino was the second wife of the Minyan king of Boeotia, Athamas. She was the mother of Learchus and Melicertes, and the stepmother of Phrixus and Helle.

== Mythology ==
=== Family affairs ===
Ino plays a role in the backstory to the Argonautica, which relates the story of Jason and the golden fleece. Ino was married to the Boeotian king Athamas, who had twin children— Phrixus and Helle— with his first wife Nephele. Ino hated the children, and devised a plot to get rid of them. She roasted all the crop seeds in Boeotia so that they would not grow. (Note: However Kerenyi (1951, p. 264) suggests "... it is possible that originally she did not cause the seed-corn to be roasted, but introduced the practice of roasting corn in general.") The local farmers, frightened of famine, asked a nearby oracle for assistance. Ino bribed the men sent to the oracle to lie and tell the others that the oracle required the sacrifice of the twins.

Before they were killed, Phrixus and Helle were rescued by a flying golden ram sent by Nephele. Helle fell off the ram into the Hellespont (which was named after her) and drowned. Phrixus survived the flight and landed in Colchis, where King Aeëtes took him in and gave Phrixus his daughter, Chalciope, in marriage. Phrixus sacrificed the ram to Zeus and gave the ram's golden fleece to Aeëtes, which the king kept in a sacred grove.

==== Themisto ====
When Athamas returned to his second wife, Ino, Themisto (his third wife) sought revenge by dressing her children in white clothing and Ino's in black and directing the murder of the children in black. Ino switched their clothes without Themisto knowing, and so Themisto instigated the murder her own children. The story of Ino and Themisto was the subject of Ino, a lost play of Euripides. Previously unknown fragments of Euripides' Ino and another play, Polyidus, were found in 2022 and publicized in 2024.

=== Dionysus ===
Later, Ino raised Dionysus, her nephew, son of her sister Semele by Zeus, (Note: Local tradition sited the suckling of Dionysus at Brasiai in Laconia. (Kerenyi 1951, p. 264)) causing Hera's intense jealousy. In vengeance, Hera struck Athamas with insanity. Athamas went mad, slew one of his sons, Learchus, hunting him down like a stag, and set out in frenzied pursuit of Ino. To escape him, Ino threw herself into the sea with her son Melicertes. Both were afterwards worshipped as marine divinities, Ino as Leucothea ("the white goddess"), Melicertes as Palaemon.

Alternatively, Ino was also stricken with insanity and killed Melicertes by boiling him in a cauldron, then jumped into the sea with her dead son. A sympathetic Zeus did not want Ino to die, and transfigured her and Melicertes as Leucothea and Palaemon. In rare versions, Ino killed Melicertes when she found out Athamas was sleeping with one of their slavewomen, Antiphera.

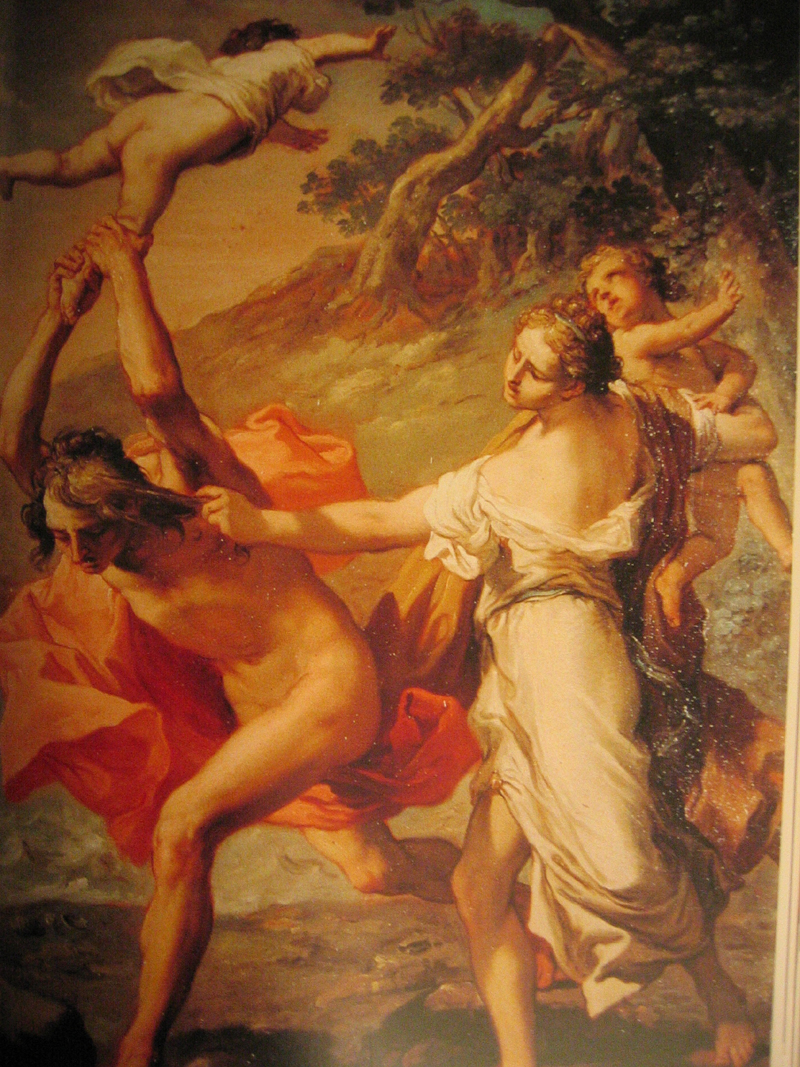
Athamas tue le fils d'Ino by Gaetano Gandolfi (1801)

The story of Ino, Athamas and Melicertes is relevant also in the context of two larger themes. Ino, daughter of Cadmus and Harmonia, had an end just as tragic as her siblings: Semele died while pregnant with Zeus' child, killed by her own pride and lack of trust in her divine lover; Agave killed her own son, King Pentheus, while struck with Dionysian madness, and Actaeon, son of Autonoë, the third sibling, was torn apart by his own hunting dogs. Also, the insanity of Ino and Athamas, who hunted his own son Learchus as a stag and slew him, can be explained as a result of their contact with Dionysus, whose presence can cause insanity. None can escape the powers of Dionysus, the god of wine. Euripides took up the tale in The Bacchae, explaining their madness in Dionysiac terms, as a result of their having initially resisted belief in the god's divinity.

After Ino's disappearance, some of her companions began to revile Hera, so the goddess turned them into birds according to Ovid, perhaps aithuia birds (shearwaters?).

In historical times, a sisterhood of maenads of Thebes in the service of Dionysus, traced their descent in the female line from Ino. We know this because an inscription at Magnesia on the Maeander summoned three maenads from Thebes, from the house of Ino, to direct the new mysteries of Dionysus at Magnesia.

=== Leucothea ===
Transformed into the goddess Leucothea, Ino also represents one of the many sources of divine aid to Odysseus in the Odyssey (5:333 ff), her earliest appearance in literature. Homer calls her

"Ino-Leocothea of the beautiful ankles [καλλίσφυρος], daughter of Cadmus, who was once a mortal speaking with the tongue of men, but now in the salt sea-waters has received honor at the hands of the gods".

She provides Odysseus with a veil and tells him to discard his cloak and raft, then instructs him how he can entrust himself to the waves and succeed in reaching land, and eventually the island of Scheria (Corcyra), home of the Phaeaceans.

== Festivals ==
Inoa (Ἰνῶα), there were festivals which were celebrated in many different places in honour of Ino.

== Genealogy ==
Argive genealogy in Greek mythology

Oceanus	Tethys
Inachus	Melia
Zeus	Io	Phoroneus
Epaphus	Memphis
Libya	Poseidon
Achiroë	Belus	Agenor	Telephassa
Danaus	Elephantis	Aegyptus	Cadmus	Cilix	Europa	Phoenix
Mantineus	Hypermnestra	Lynceus	Harmonia	Zeus
Sparta	Lacedaemon	Ocalea	Abas	Polydorus	Agave	Sarpedon	Rhadamanthus
Eurydice	Acrisius	Autonoë	Ino	Minos
Zeus	Danaë	Semele	Zeus
Perseus	Dionysus

Colour key:

Male
Female
Deity

== Gallery ==
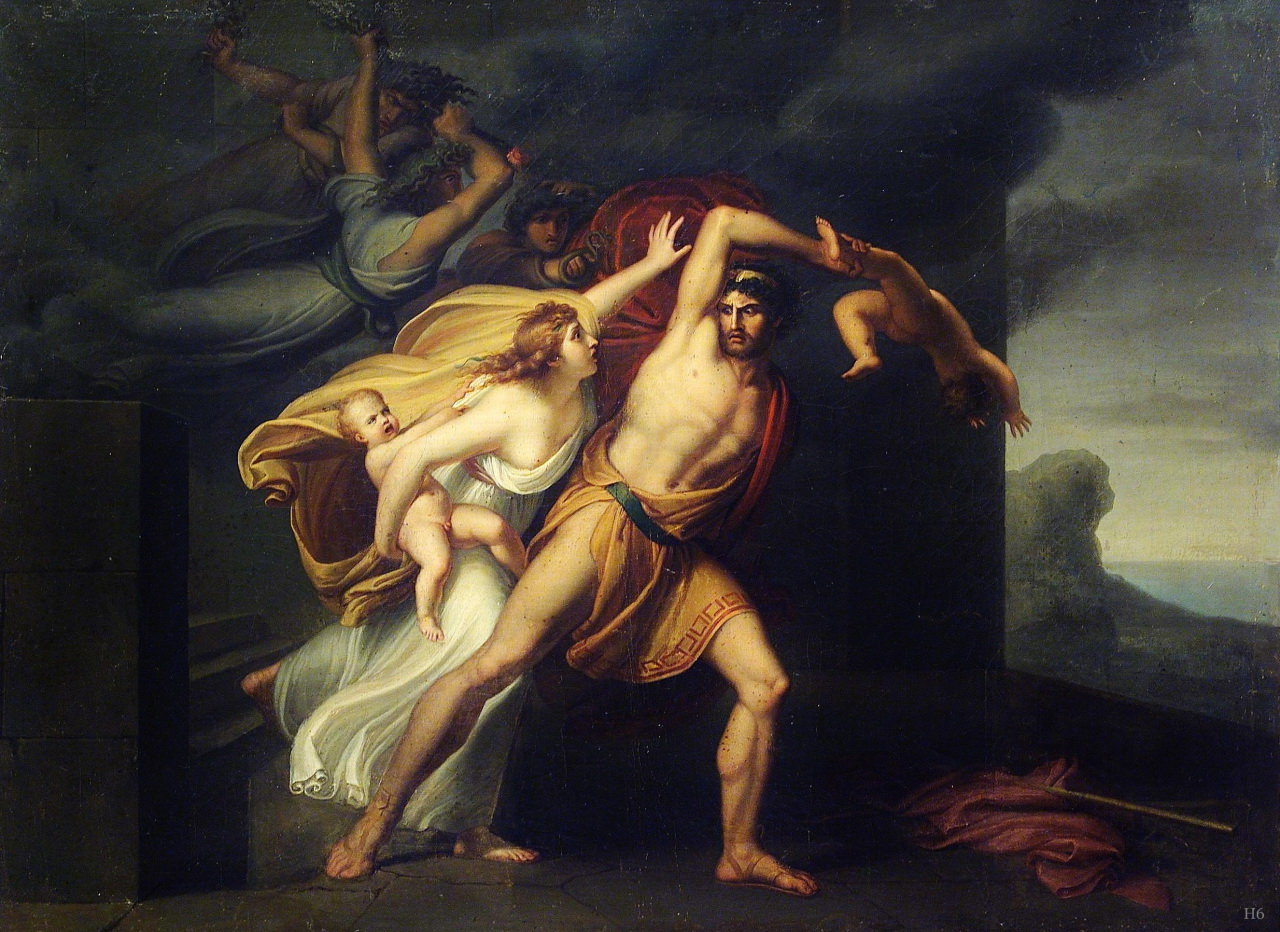
Atamante preso dalle Furie, by Arcangelo Migliarini (1801) Accademia di San Luca, Roma, IT

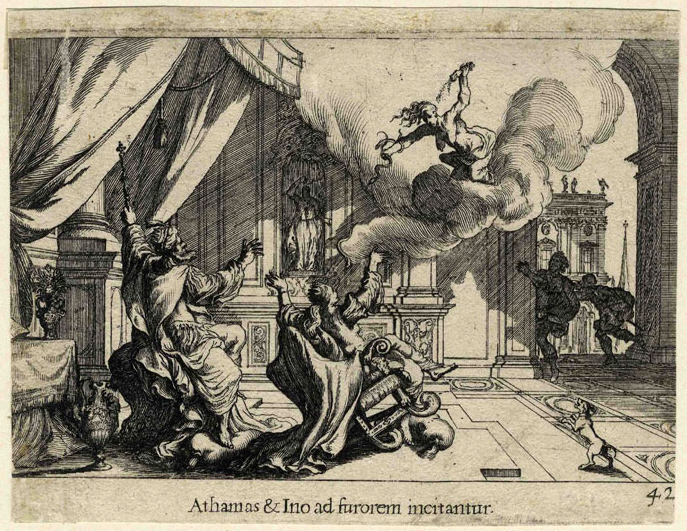
Athamas und Ino by Radierung (17th century)

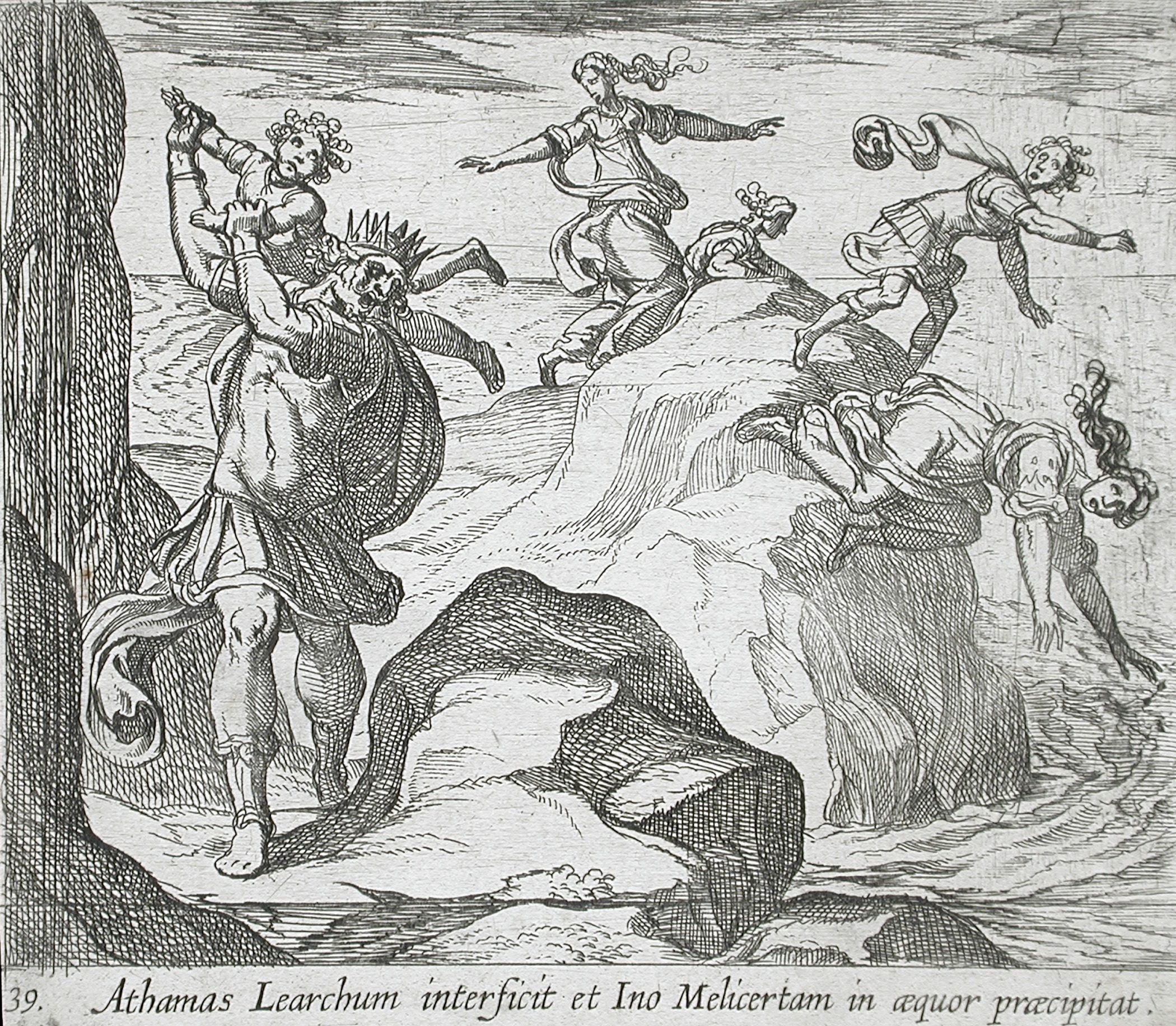
The insane Athamas killing Learchus, while Ino and Melicertor jump into the sea, by Wilhelm Janson (Amsterdam, NL), Antonio Tempesta (Italy, Florence, 1555–1630) at Los Angeles County Museum of Art, Los Angeles, CA

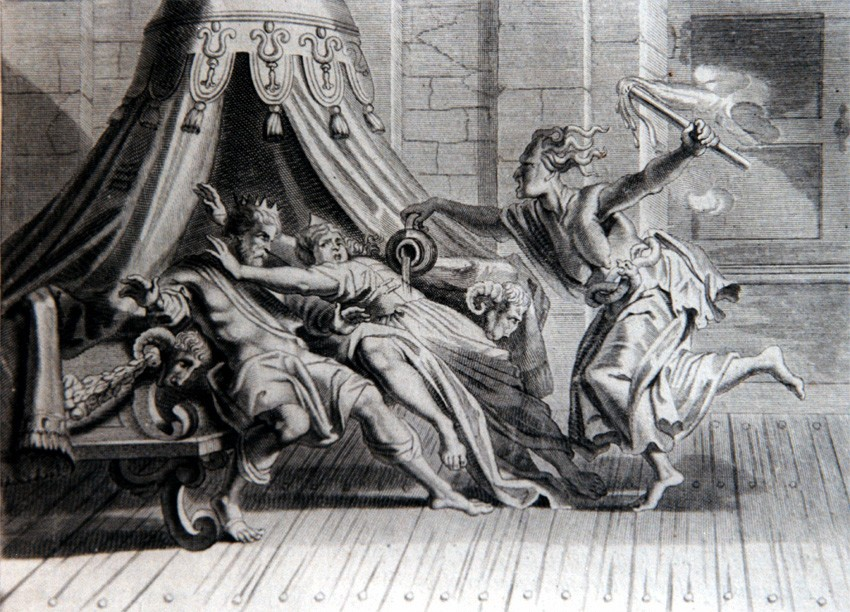
Tisiphone maddens Athamas & Ino (17th century)

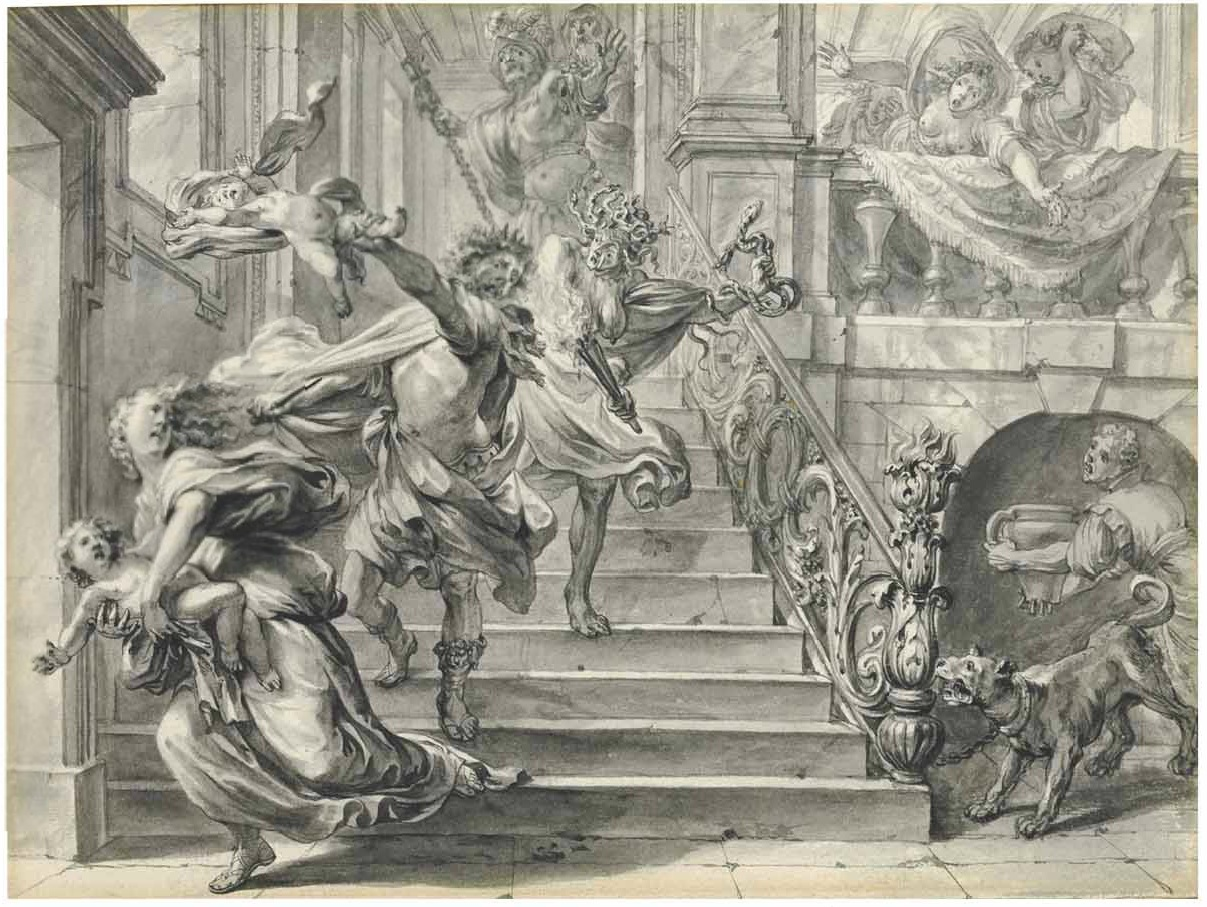
Athamas tearing apart his children, by Godfried Maes

== Sources ==
- pseudo-Apollodorus (1921). "Online version". Bibliotheca [The Library]. Translated by Frazer, J.G. Cambridge, MA / London, UK: Harvard University Press / William Heinemann Ltd. ISBN 0-674-99135-4 – via Perseus Digital Library, Tufts University (perseus.tufts.edu) (2 volumes). — "Greek text" – via Perseus Digital Library, Tufts University (perseus.tufts.edu).
- Burkert, Walter (1992). The Orientalizing Revolution: Near Eastern influence on Greek culture in the early Archaic Age. Cambridge, MA: Harvard University Press.
- Campbell, David A. (1988). "Volume II: Anacreon, Anacreontea, choral lyric from Olympus to Alcman". Greek Lyric. Loeb Classical Library. Vol. 143. Cambridge, MA: Harvard University Press. ISBN 978-0-674-99158-3 – via Harvard U. Press (loebclassics.com).
- Dalby, Andrew (2005). The Story of Bacchus. London, UK: British Museum Press. pp. 36–42, 151. ISBN 0-7141-2255-6. (US ISBN 0-89236-742-3)
- Hesiod (1914). "Theogony (English translation)". The Homeric Hymns and Homerica. Translated by Evelyn-White, H.G. Cambridge, MA / London, UK: Harvard University Press / William Heinemann Ltd – via Perseus Digital Library (Tufts University). "Greek text also available" – via Perseus Digital Library (Tufts University).
- Kerenyi, K. (1976). Dionysus: Archetypal image of indestructible life. Princeton, NJ: Bollingen.
- Kerenyi, K. (1951). The Gods of the Greeks. London, UK: Thames and Hudson.
