= Learchus =

Greek mythological figure

- Prince of Boeotia
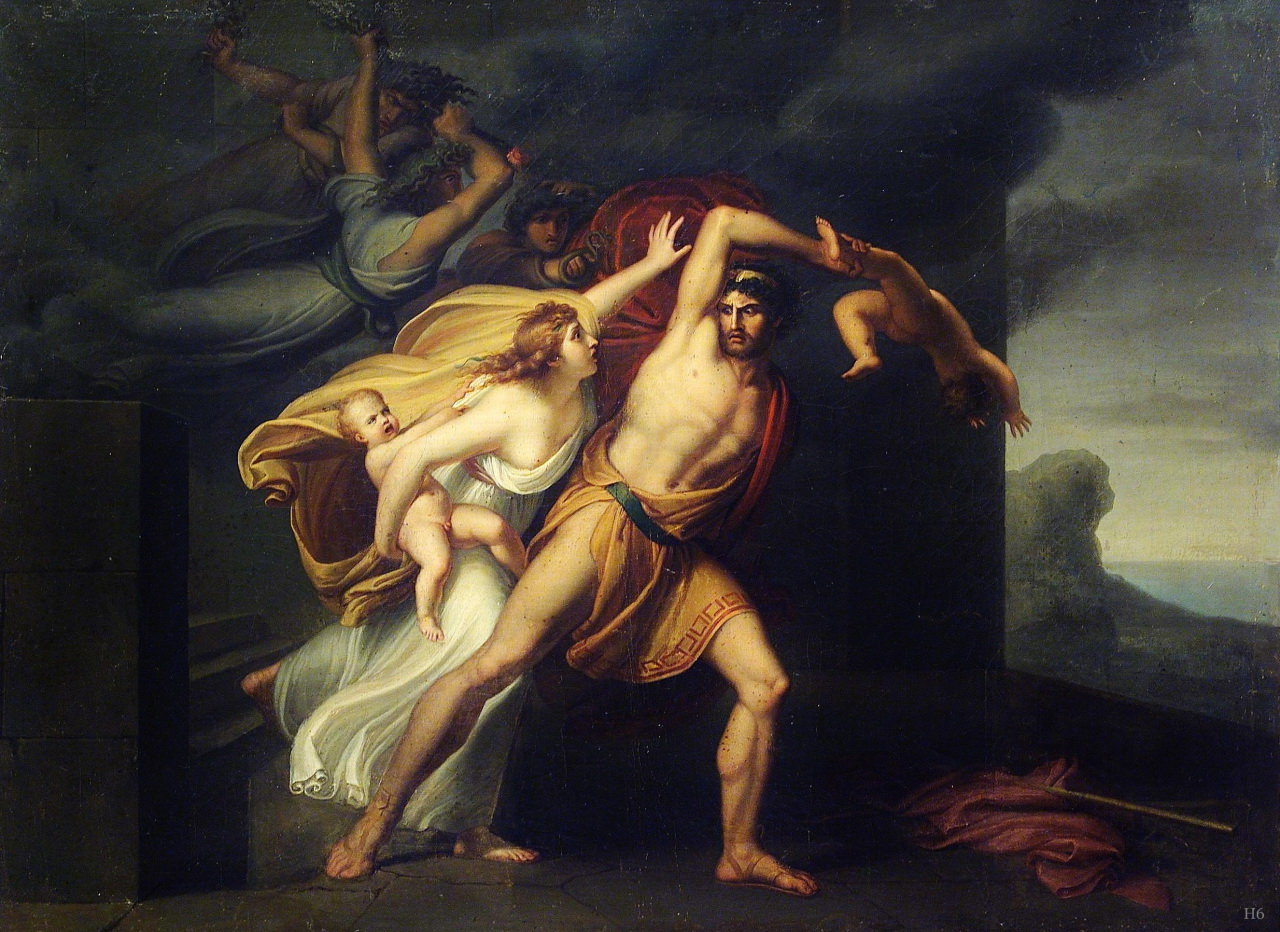
- Atamante preso dalle Furie by Arcangelo Migliarini (1801) at Roma, Accademia di San Luca
- Other names: Learches
- Abode: Boeotia

Genealogy
- Parents: Athamas and Ino
- Siblings: Melicertes

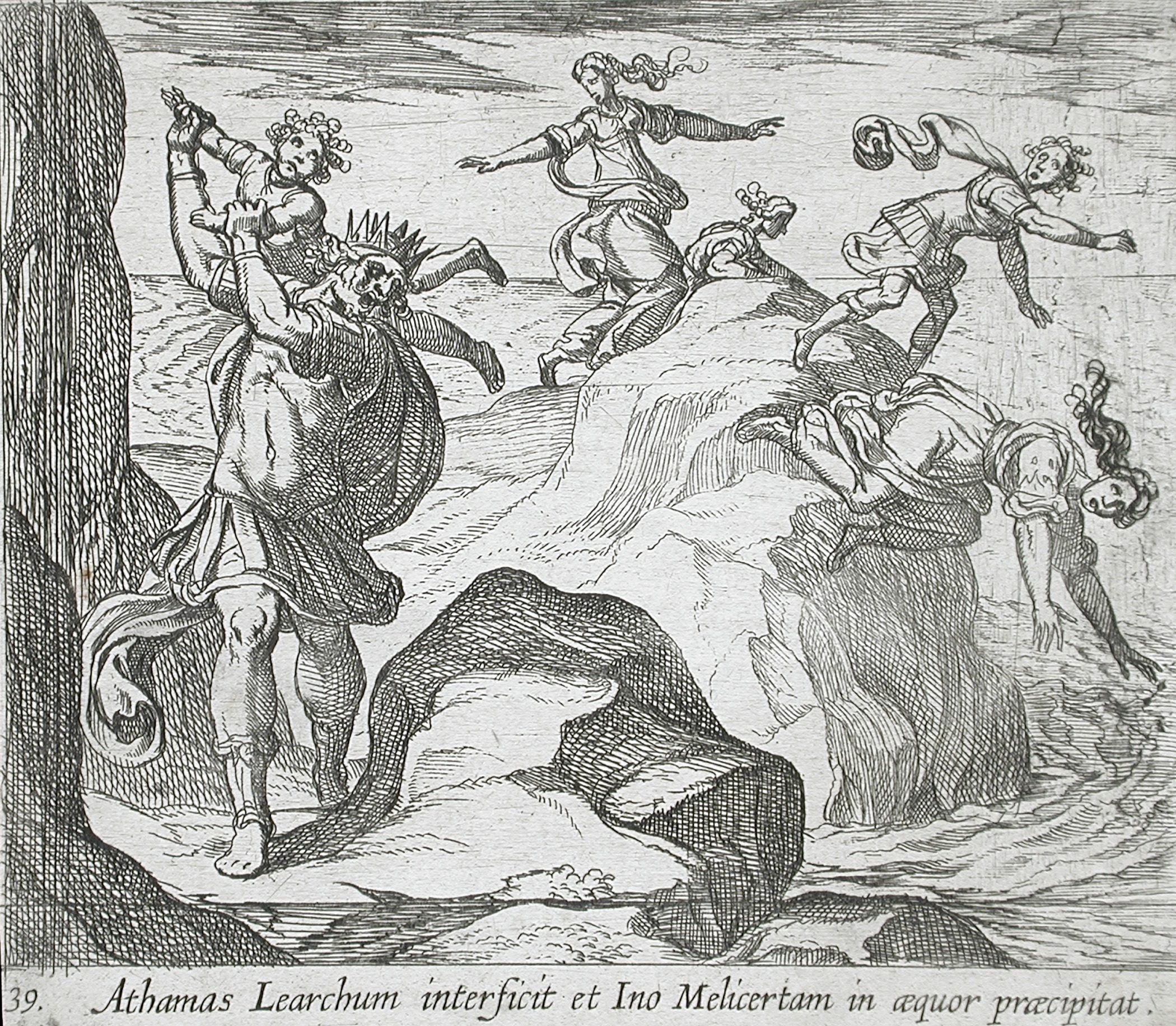
The Insane Athamas Killing Learchus, While Ino and Melicertor Jump into the Sea by Wilhelm Janson (Holland, Amsterdam), Antonio Tempesta (Italy, Florence, 1555–1630) at Los Angeles County Museum of Art, Los Angeles

In Greek mythology, Learchus (Ancient Greek: Λέαρχος) or Learches was the son of King Athamas and Ino, daughter of King Cadmus of Thebes. He was the brother of Melicertes.

== Mythology ==
The story of Learchus is part of the Theban Cycle which was elaborated by Ovid in his Metamorphoses. He was killed as a boy by his father, Athamas, whom Hera drove insane as punishment for having received and raised Dionysus, the illegitimate son of Zeus and Semele, Ino's sister.

Athamas, blinded by the madness, exchanged Learchus for a lion (or a ram/ fawn, in other versions) and killed him. After this, Athamas went in frenzied pursuit of Ino, who jumped into the sea with their other son, Melicertes. Ovid adds some details to this story, saying, for instance, that Learchus had spontaneously stretched out his arms to his father to hug him, not knowing that he was mad and would slay him.

Dante cites this myth as an example of insanity in his Inferno (Canto XXX).

== Bibliography ==
- Dante, Divine Comedy, Inferno, Canto XXX, 7–12.
- Grimal, Pierre, The Dictionary of Classical Mythology, Malden, Oxford, and Carlton, Blackwell Publishing, 1986. ISBN 0631201025. Internet Archive.
- Ovid, Metamorphoses translated by Brookes More (1859-1942). Boston, Cornhill Publishing Co. 1922. Online version at the Perseus Digital Library. Book IV, Fable VII.
- Ovid, Metamorphoses. Hugo Magnus. Gotha (Germany). Friedr. Andr. Perthes. 1892. Latin text available at the Perseus Digital Library.
