= Marylebone Gardens =

Former public garden in England

Coordinates: 51.5215°N 0.1500°W

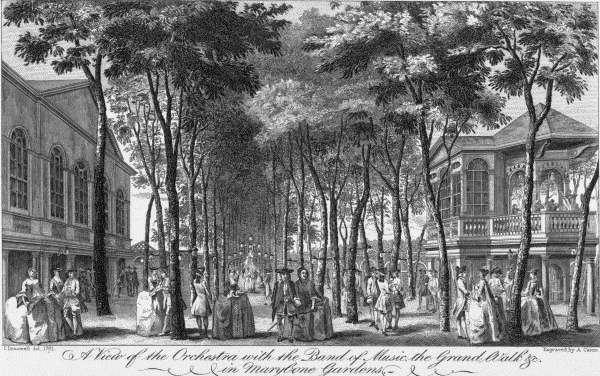
"A view of the Orchestra with the Band of Music, the Grand Walk &c in Marybone Gardens", engraving from a drawing by J. Donowell, 1761

Marylebone Gardens or Marybone Gardens was a London pleasure garden sited in the grounds of the old manor house of Marylebone and frequented from the mid-17th century, when Marylebone was a village separated from London by fields and market gardens, to the third quarter of the 18th century.

== Early history ==
It was situated in the area which is now between Marylebone Road, Marylebone High Street, Weymouth Street, and Harley Street; its site was developed as Beaumont Street and part of Devonshire Street.

Originally consisting of two bowling greens adjoining the Rose of Normandy tavern on the east side of Marylebone High Street, its size was increased to about eight acres by acquisition of land from Marylebone Manor House, which had been converted into a hunting lodge by Henry VIII and was later used as a boarding school, eventually being demolished in 1791.

The Marylebone Gardens, surrounded by a high brick wall and set about with fruit trees, had a carriage entrance in the High Street of Marylebone village and another entrance from the fields at the back. Its center was an open oval bowling green encompassed by a wide gravelled walk and many smaller walks and greens surrounded by clipped quickset hedges, which were "kept in good order, and indented like town walls."

Marylebone Gardens were mentioned by John Gay in The Beggar's Opera (1728) as a haunt of its 'hero', the highwayman Macheath. The tavern had become a resort for gambling, and "There will be deep play tonight" Macheath says to a confederate, "and consequently money may be pick'd up on the road. Meet me there, and I'll give you the hint who is worth setting." The real highwayman Dick Turpin was a visitor in the 1720s. The gardens were used for, amongst other entertainments, gambling, cock-fighting, bull-baiting and boxing matches (with both male and female contestants).

== Concert venue ==
Marylebone Gardens were officially reorganized as a venue for concerts and other entertainments in 1738 by Daniel Gough, the new proprietor of the Rose tavern. An organ by Richard Bridge was installed.

Halls were built for shelter in 1739, and the entrance fee was increased to a sixpence to keep out the undesired poor. Silver-plated season tickets were also available. Refreshments were another draw for the mid-century Marylebone Gardens, under the direction of the caterer John Trusler, who took over the management about 1756, and presented public dinners and breakfasts. His daughter made the popular Marylebone tarts and cakes. "Tarts of a twelvepenny size," reads the advertisement of 1760, "will be made every day from one to three o'clock... The almond cheesecake will be always hot at one o'clock as usual." Once the Great Room for balls and supper had been erected on the site (1739–40), breakfasts were added to the schedule.

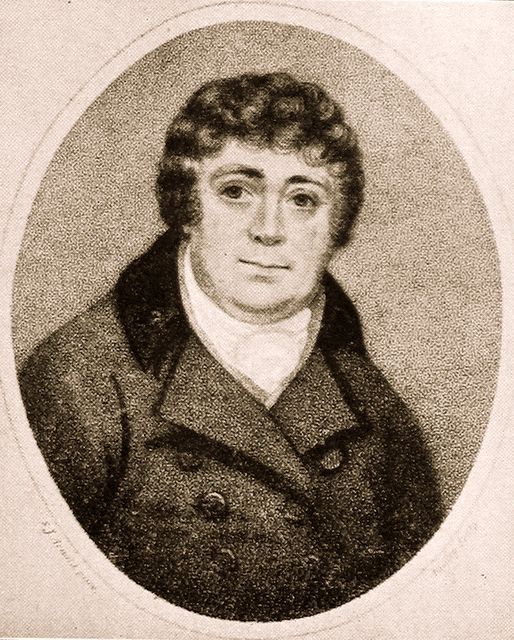
Samuel Arnold, manager of Marylebone Gardens from 1769

Many of the foremost London musicians and composers including George Frideric Handel and James Hook performed works here, The original principal female singer was a Miss Faulkner and the orchestra was led by William Defesch. From 1763 to 1768 the Gardens were run by Thomas Lowe, who had been a singer at Vauxhall Gardens, with the musical management undertaken by Samuel Arnold who took over the ownership and management with the violinist Thomas Pinto which arrangement continued from 1769 to 1774.

In 1758, under the direction of Trusler's son, the Gardens gave the English premiere of Pergolesi's opera La serva padrona (in translation).

Hook was appointed organist and composer to the Gardens in 1769 and held an annual festival there every summer. The gardens were also famous for their regular firework displays, organised from 1772 to 1774 by Signor Torre. The Rose Tavern was later developed as a music hall and renamed "The Marylebone". The area was eventually built over in 1778. Later it became the site of the studios of BBC London 94.9 until September 2009.
