= Bronze art =

Bronze art is art made in bronze, and often brass. It may refer to:

- Bronze sculpture
- Art in bronze and brass, mostly covering small and applied art pieces

== See also ==
Category:Bronze sculptures and Category:Bronze objects for specific pieces
