= List of epic poems =

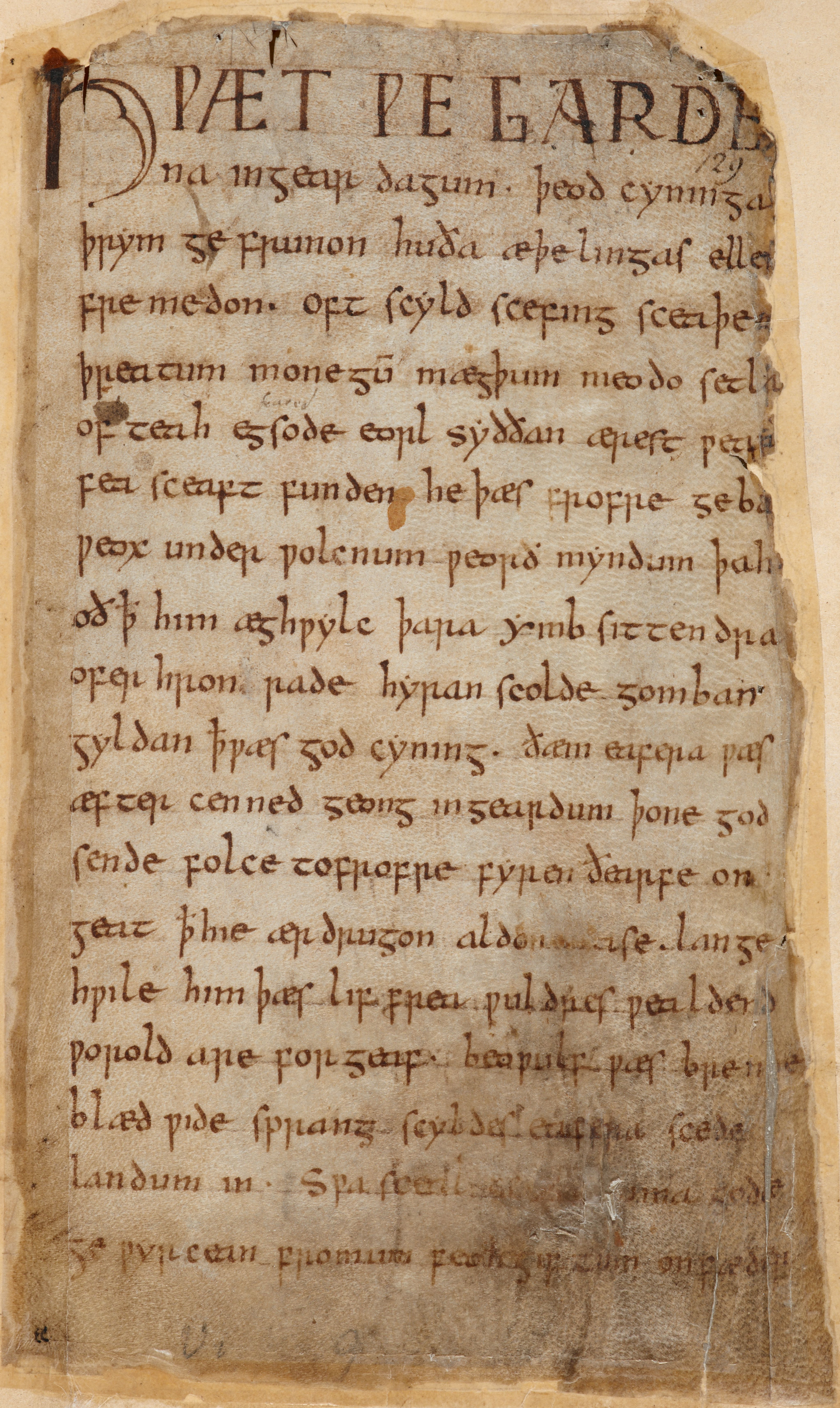
The first page of the Beowulf manuscript, 8th to 10th century.

This is a list of epic poems.

== Ancient epics (to AD 500) ==
=== Before the 8th century BC ===
- Epic of Gilgamesh (Mesopotamian religion)
- Epic of Lugalbanda (including Lugalbanda in the Mountain Cave and Lugalbanda and the Anzud Bird, Mesopotamian religion)
- Epic of Enmerkar (including Enmerkar and the Lord of Aratta and Enmerkar and En-suhgir-ana, Mesopotamian religion)
- Atrahasis (Mesopotamian religion)
- Enuma Elish (Babylonian religion)
- The Descent of Inanna into the Underworld (Mesopotamian religion)
- Legend of Keret (Ugaritic religion)

=== 8th to 6th centuries BC ===
- Iliad, ascribed to Homer (Greek mythology)
- Odyssey, ascribed to Homer (Greek mythology)
- Works and Days, composed by Hesiod (Greek mythology)
- Theogony, composed by Hesiod (Greek mythology)
- Shield of Heracles, ascribed to Hesiod (Greek mythology)
- Catalogue of Women, ascribed to Hesiod (Greek mythology; only fragments survive)
- Cypria, Aethiopis, Little Iliad, Iliupersis, Nostoi and Telegony, forming the so-called Epic Cycle (only fragments survive)
- Oedipodea, Thebaid, Epigoni and Alcmeonis, forming the so-called Theban Cycle (only fragments survive)
- A series of poems ascribed to Hesiod during antiquity (of which only fragments survive): Aegimius (alternatively ascribed to Cercops of Miletus), Astronomia, Descent of Perithous, Idaean Dactyls (almost completely lost), Megala Erga, Megalai Ehoiai, Melampodia and Wedding of Ceyx
- Capture of Oechalia, ascribed to Homer or Creophylus of Samos during antiquity (only a fragment survives)
- Phocais, ascribed to Homer during antiquity (only a fragment survives)
- Titanomachy ascribed to Eumelus of Corinth (only a fragment survives)
- Danais (written by one of the cyclic poets and from which the Danaid tetralogy of Aeschylus draws its material), Minyas and Naupactia (almost completely lost)

=== 5th to 4th centuries BC ===
- Heracleia, tells of the labors of Heracles, almost completely lost, written by Panyassis (Greek mythology)
- Mahābhārata, ascribed to Veda Vyasa (Indian mythology)
- Ramayana, ascribed to Valmiki (Indian mythology)

=== 3rd century BC ===
- Argonautica by Apollonius of Rhodes (Greek mythology)
- Batrachomyomachia, ascribed to Homer in antiquity (Parodic epic)

=== 2nd century BC ===
- Annales by Ennius (Roman history; only fragments survive)

=== 1st century BC ===
- De rerum natura by Lucretius (natural philosophy)
- Georgics by Virgil (didactic poem)
- Aeneid by Virgil (Roman mythology)

=== 1st century AD ===
- Metamorphoses by Ovid (Greek and Roman mythology)
- Pharsalia by Lucan (Roman history; unfinished)
- Argonautica by Gaius Valerius Flaccus (Roman poet, Greek mythology; incomplete)
- Punica by Silius Italicus (Roman history)
- Thebaid and Achilleid by Statius (Roman poet, Greek mythology; latter poem incomplete)

=== 2nd century ===
- Buddhacarita by Aśvaghoṣa (Indian epic poetry)
- Halieutica by Oppian (Greek didactic on fishing)

=== 3rd to 4th centuries ===
- Posthomerica by Quintus of Smyrna (Greek mythology)
- The Sack of Troy by Triphiodorus (Greek mythology)
- The Vision of Dorotheus by Dorotheus (Christian Epic)
- Cento Vergilianus de laudibus Christi by Faltonia Betitia Proba

=== 4th century ===
- Kumārasambhava by Kālidāsa (Indian epic poetry)
- Raghuvaṃśa by Kālidāsa (Indian epic poetry)
- Blemyomachia (Greek, only fragments survive)
- De raptu Proserpinae by Claudian (Roman poet, Greek mythology; incomplete)
- Evangeliorum Libri Quattuor by Juvencus (Gospel Epic)
- Gigantomachy by Claudian (Greek Mythology; incomplete)

=== 5th century ===
- Argonautica Orphica by Anonymous (Greek mythology)
- Carmen Paschale by Sedulius (Gospel Epic)
- Paraphrasis Evangelii Sancti Ionhannis by Nonnus (Biblical Paraphrase)
- Dionysiaca by Nonnus (Greek mythology)
- Mahavamsa first composed by Mahānāma (Pali epic)
- Psychomachia by Prudentius (Christian allegory)
- Yadegar-e Zariran (Zoroastrian Middle Persian epic)
- Cilappatikāram by Iḷaṅkō Aṭikaḷ (Tamil epic)
- Manimekalai by Kulavāṇikaṉ Seethalai Sataṉar (Tamil buddhist epic)

== Medieval epics (500–1500) ==
=== 6th century ===
- De Actibus Apostolorum by Arator, epic retelling of the Acts of the Apostles
- Iohannis by Corippus, Latin epic on the Byzantine conquest of North Africa
- The Abduction of Helen by Colluthus, Greek mythology
- Kar-Namag i Ardashir i Pabagan, This epic narrates the story of Ardashir I, the founder of the Sassanid dynasty, written in Middle Persian
- Vita Sancti Martini by Venantius Fortunatus, on the life of St Martin of Tours

=== 7th century ===
- Táin Bó Cúailnge (Old Irish)
- Bhaṭṭikāvya, Sanskrit courtly epic based on the Rāmāyaṇa and the Aṣṭādhyāyī of Pāṇini
- Kiratarjuniya by Bharavi, Sanskrit epic based on an episode in the Mahabharata
- Shishupala Vadha by Magha, Sanskrit epic based on another episode in the Mahabharata

=== 8th to 10th centuries ===
- Beowulf (Old English)
- Waldere, Old English version of the story told in Waltharius (below), known only as a brief fragment
- Alpamysh, a Turkic epic
- Karolus magnus et Leo papa (Carolingian, Latin, before 814)
- Daredevils of Sassoun (Armenian)
- Bhagavata Purana (Sanskrit) "Stories of the Lord", based on earlier sources
- Lay of Hildebrand and Muspilli (Old High German, c. 870)
- Kakawin Ramayana, Javanese version of the Ramayana (c. 870)
- Shahnameh (Persian literature; details Persian legend and history from prehistoric times to the fall of the Sassanid Empire, by Ferdowsi)
- Waltharius by Ekkehard of St. Gall (Germany, Latin); about Walter of Aquitaine
- Poetic Edda (no particular authorship; oral tradition of the North Germanic peoples)
- Vikramarjuna Vijaya and Ādi purāṇa (c. 941), Kannada poems by Adikavi Pampa
- Ajitha Purana and Gadaayuddha (c.993 and c.999), Kannada poems by Ranna
- Neelakesi (Tamil Jain epic)
- Cīvaka Cintāmaṇi by Tiruttakkatēvar (Tamil epic)
- Valayapathi by Kamil Zvelebil (Tamil jain epic; almost entirely lost)
- Kundalakēci by Nathakuthanaar (Tamil buddhist epic; fragments survive)

=== 11th century ===
The Knight in the Panther's Skin by Shota Rustaveli, one of the greatest Georgian poets.

- Taghribat Bani Hilal (Arabic); see also Arabic epic literature
- Andhra Mahabharatam (Telugu) by Nannayya
- Ruodlieb (Latin), by a German author
- Digenes Akritas (Greek); about a hero of the Byzantine Empire
- Epic of King Gesar (Tibetan)
- Garshaspname (Persian) by Asadi Tusi (1066)
- Carmen Campidoctoris, the first poem about El Cid (c. 1083)
- Song of Armouris (Byzantine, acritic song)
- Borzu Nama, ascribed to 'Amid Abu'l 'Ala' 'Ata b. Yaqub Kateb Razi (Persian epic with a main character and a poetic style related to the "Shahnameh")
- Faramarz Nama (Persian epic with a main character and a poetic style related to the "Shahnameh")
- Mushika-vamsha (Sanskrit) by Atula
- The Song of Roland (Old French)

=== 12th century ===
- Khamba Thoibi (Manipuri Epic by Hijam Anganghal)
- Acallam na Senórach (Middle Irish)
- Historia Regum Britanniae (Latin)
- The Knight in the Panther's Skin (Georgian) by Shota Rustaveli
- Alexandreis by Walter of Châtillon (Latin)
- De bello Troiano and the lost Antiocheis (Latin) by Joseph of Exeter
- Carmen de Prodicione Guenonis, version of the story of the Song of Roland in Latin
- Architrenius by John of Hauville, (Latin satire)
- Liber ad honorem Augusti by Peter of Eboli, narrative of the conquest of Sicily by Henry VI, Holy Roman Emperor (Latin)
- The Tale of Igor's Campaign and Bylinas (Old east Slavic) (11th–19th centuries)
- Gita Govinda (Sanskrit) by Jayadeva
- Naishadha Charita (Sanskrit) by Sriharsha
- Parishishtaparvan (Sanskrit) by Hemachandra
- Prithviraja Vijaya (Sanskrit) by Jayanaka (1191–1192)
- Roman de Troie by Benoît de Sainte-Maure (Old French)
- Roman de Brut and Roman de Rou by Wace (Old French)
- Poem of Almería (Latin)
- Eupolemius (Latin) by an anonymous German-speaking author
- Bahman Nama and Kush Nama (Persian) ascribed to Hakim Īrānšāh b. Abi'l Khayr
- Banu Goshasp Nama (Persian)
- Ramavataram (Tamil) by Kambar, based on the "Ramayana"
- Cycle of the First Crusade (Old French) by Graindor de Douai and others

=== 13th century ===
- Nibelungenlied (Middle High German)
- Kudrun (Middle High German)
- Daniel von dem blühenden Tal (Middle High German)
- Brut by Layamon (Early Middle English)
- Chanson de la Croisade Albigeoise ("Song of the Albigensian Crusade"; Old Occitan)
- Antar (Arabic); see also Arabic epic literature
- Sirat al-Zahir Baibars (Arabic); see also Arabic epic literature
- Osman's Dream (Ottoman Turkish)
- Epic of Sundiata (Malinke People)
- El Cantar de Mio Cid, Spanish epic of the Reconquista (Old Spanish)
- De triumphis ecclesiae by Johannes de Garlandia (Latin)
- Gesta Regum Britanniae by William of Rennes (Latin)
- Van den vos Reynaerde (Middle Dutch)
- Poema de Fernán González, cantar de gesta by a monk of San Pedro de Arlanza; 1250–1266 (Old Spanish)
- Jewang ungi by Yi Seung-hyu ("Rhymed Chronicles of Sovereigns"; 1287 Korea)
- Basava purana by Palkuriki Somanatha (Telugu)
- Jahangirnama by Qasim Madih Harawi (largely an imitation of the Borzu Nama)

=== 14th century ===
- Alliterative Morte Arthure (Middle English)(c. 1375–1400)
- Divine Comedy (Christian mythology) by Dante Alighieri
- Cursor Mundi (Middle English) by an anonymous cleric (c. 1300)
- Africa by Petrarch (Latin)
- The Tale of the Heike, Japanese epic war tale
- The Brus by John Barbour (Scots)
- La Spagna (Italian) attributed to Sostegno di Zanobi (c. 1350–1360)
- Mocedades de Rodrigo (Old Spanish) (c. 1360)
- Siege of Jerusalem (c. 1370–1380, Middle English)
- Troilus and Criseyde (Middle English) by Geoffrey Chaucer (c.1380)
- Mabinogi (Middle Welsh)
- Zafarnamah (Persian) by Hamdollah Mostowfi

=== 15th century ===
- Hammira Mahakavya by Nayachandra Suri (Sanskrit)
- The Fall of the Princes by John Lydgate (1431–1438)
- Yuan Phai (Thai: ลิลิตยวนพ่าย) by Royal Poets of King Borommatrai-lokkanat (c. 1475)
- Mahachat Kham luang (Thai: มหาชาติคำหลวง) a Siamese retelling of Vessantara Jataka by Royal Poets of King Borommatrai-lokkanat (1492)
- Orlando innamorato (Italian) by Matteo Maria Boiardo (1495)
- Shmuel-Bukh (Old Yiddish chivalry romance based on the Biblical book of Samuel)
- Mlokhim-Bukh (Old Yiddish epic poem based on the Biblical Books of Kings)
- Book of Dede Korkut (Oghuz Turks)
- Le Morte d'Arthur (Middle English)
- Morgante (Italian) by Luigi Pulci (1485), with elements typical of the mock-heroic genre
- The Wallace by Blind Harry (Scots chivalric poem)
- Troy Book by John Lydgate, about the Trojan war (Middle English)
- Heldenbuch (Middle High German) a group of manuscripts and prints of the 15th and 16th centuries, typically including material from the Theodoric cycle and the cycle of Hugdietrich, Wolfdietrich and Ortnit
- Ibong Adarna (Filipino) whose real author is not known

== Modern epics (from 1500) ==
=== 16th century ===
- Lilit Phra Lo (Thai: ลิลิตพระลอ) by King Ramathibodi II (c. 1491–1529)
- Judita (Croatian) by Marko Marulić (1501)
- Shahenshah Nameh and Khamsa (including Timurnameh) by Hatefi, Poetic Epics One about exploits of Shah Ismail I and the other about Timur (1510)
- Ismailnameh an epic poem on shah Ismail I heroic deeds by Qsimi Qunabadi nephew of Hatifi (1513)
- Orlando Furioso (Italian) by Ludovico Ariosto (1516)
- Theuerdank and Weisskunig (Weisskunig was not published until 1775) by Maximilian I and Marx Treitzsaurwein, often considered the last medieval epics.
- Davidiad (Latin) by Marko Marulić (1517)
- Christiad (Latin) by Marco Girolamo Vida (1535)
- Padmavat (Hindustani) by Malik Muhammad Jayasi (1540)
- Süleymanname by Arifi çelebi (1558)
- Sang Sinxay, the most famous epic poem of Laos, was written around mid sixteenth century.
- Franciade (French) by Pierre de Ronsard (1540s–1572)
- De Gestis Mendi de Saa by Joseph of Anchieta (1560)
- L'Amadigi by Bernardo Tasso (1560)
- La Araucana by Alonso de Ercilla y Zúñiga (1569–1589)
- Os Lusíadas by Luís de Camões (c. 1572)
- La Gerusalemme liberata by Torquato Tasso (1575)
- Ramacharitamanasa (based on the Ramayana) by Goswami Tulsidas (1577)
- The Faerie Queene (Early Modern English) by Edmund Spenser (1596)
- Venus and Adonis (1593) and The Rape of Lucrece (1594) (Early Modern English) by Shakespeare
- The Dam San of the Ede people (now in Vietnam) is often considered to have appeared in the 16th or 17th century.

=== 17th century ===
- La Argentina by Martín del Barco Centenera (1602)
- La Cleopatra by Girolamo Graziani (1632)
- Biag ni Lam-ang by Pedro Bucaneg (1640)
- Il Conquisto di Granata by Girolamo Graziani (1650)
- Exact Epitome of the Four Monarchies by Anne Bradstreet (1650)
- Szigeti veszedelem, also known under the Latin title Obsidionis Szigetianae, a Hungarian epic by Miklós Zrínyi (1651)
- Gondibert by William Davenant (1651)
- Paradise Lost (1667) (English) and Paradise Regained (1671) by John Milton
- Khun Chang Khun Phaen (Thai: ขุนช้างขุนแผน), a Thai epic poem by anonymous folk poets (c. 1650–1700)

=== 18th century ===
- Kumulipo by Keaulumoku (1700), an Ancient Hawaiian cosmogonic genealogy first published in 1889
- Henriade by Voltaire (1723)
- Utendi wa Tambuka by Bwana Mwengo (1728)
- Der Messias by Friedrich Gottlieb Klopstock (1748–1773)
- La Pucelle d'Orléans by Voltaire (1756)
- Poems of Ossian by James Macpherson (1760–1765)
- The Seasons by Kristijonas Donelaitis (1765–1775)
- O Uraguai by Basílio da Gama (1769)
- Caoineadh Airt Uí Laoghaire by Eibhlín Dubh Ní Chonaill (1773)
- O Desertor das Letras by Silva Alvarenga (1774), a short mock-heroic epic
- Caramuru by Santa Rita Durão (1781)
- Joan of Arc by Robert Southey (1796)
- Hermann and Dorothea by Johann Wolfgang von Goethe (1797)

=== 19th century ===
- The Tale of Kiều by Nguyễn Du (c. 1800)
- Thalaba the Destroyer by Robert Southey (1801)
- Madoc by Robert Southey (1805)
- Psyche by Mary Tighe (1805)
- The Columbiad by Joel Barlow (1807)
- Milton: A Poem by William Blake (1804–1810)
- Marmion by Walter Scott (1808)
- Alipashiad by Haxhi Shehreti (before 1817)
- Childe Harold's Pilgrimage by Lord Byron, narrating the travels of Childe Harold (1812–1818)
- Queen Mab by Percy Bysshe Shelley (1813)
- Roderick the Last of the Goths by Robert Southey (1814)
- The Lord of the Isles by Walter Scott (1813)
- Alastor, or The Spirit of Solitude by Percy Bysshe Shelley (1815)
- The Revolt of Islam (Laon and Cyntha) by Percy Bysshe Shelley (1817)
- Harold the Dauntless by Walter Scott (1817)
- Manuscripts of Dvůr Králové and Zelená Hora, forged epic published in 1818
- Endymion (1818) by John Keats
- Hyperion (1818) and The Fall of Hyperion (1819) by John Keats
- The Battle of Marathon by Elizabeth Barrett Browning (1820)
- Phra Aphai Mani by Sunthorn Phu (1821 or 1822–1844)
- Camões by Almeida Garrett (1825), narrating the last years and deeds of Luís de Camões
- Dona Branca by Almeida Garrett (1826), the fantastic tale of the forbidden love between Portuguese princess Branca and Moorish king Aben-Afan
- Tamerlane by Edgar Allan Poe (1827)
- The Free Besieged by Dionysios Solomos (1828–1851)
- The Fall of Nineveh by Edwin Atherstone (1828–1868)
- Creation, Man and the Messiah by Henrik Wergeland (1829)
- The Bronze Horseman by Alexander Pushkin (1833)
- Messiah's Kingdom by Agnes Bulmer (1833)
- Pan Tadeusz by Adam Mickiewicz (1834)
- The Baptism on the Savica (Krst pri Savici) by France Prešeren (1836)
- Florante at Laura, an awit by Francisco Balagtas (1838)
- Vila Rica by Claudio Manuel da Costa] (written in 1773, published in 1839)
- Haidamaky by Taras Shevchenko (1841)
- King Alfred by John Fitchett (completed by Robert Roscoe and published in 1841–1842)
- Horatius by Thomas Babington Macaulay (1842)
- Germany. A Winter's Tale by Heinrich Heine (1843), a "mock" epic
- János Vitéz by Sándor Petőfi (1845)
- Smrt Smail-age Čengića by Ivan Mažuranić (1846)
- Toldi (1846), Toldi szerelme ("Toldi's Love", 1879) and Toldi estéje ("Toldi's Night", 1848) by János Arany, forming the so-called "Toldi trilogy"
- Evangeline by Henry Wadsworth Longfellow (1847)
- The Mountain Wreath by Petar II Petrović-Njegoš (1847)
- The Tales of Ensign Stål by Johan Ludvig Runeberg (first part published in 1848, second part published in 1860)
- Kalevala by Elias Lönnrot (1849; Finnish mythology)
- I-Juca-Pirama (1851) by Gonçalves Dias
- Kalevipoeg by Friedrich Reinhold Kreutzwald (1853; Estonian mythology)
- The Prelude by William Wordsworth
- Song of Myself by Walt Whitman (1855)
- The Song of Hiawatha by Henry Wadsworth Longfellow (1855)
- A Independência do Brasil by Antonio Gonsalves Teixeira e Sousa (1855)
- A Confederação dos Tamoios by Gonçalves de Magalhães (1856)
- The Saga of King Olaf by Henry Wadsworth Longfellow (1856–1863)
- Aurora Leigh by Elizabeth Barrett Browning (1857)
- Os Timbiras by Gonçalves Dias (1857)
- Meghnad Badh Kavya by Michael Madhusudan Dutta (1861)
- Terje Vigen by Henrik Ibsen (1862)
- La Légende des siècles (The Legend of the Centuries) by Victor Hugo (1859–1877)
- The Earthly Paradise by William Morris (1868–1870)
- Ibonia, oral epic of Madagascar (first transcription: 1870)
- Martín Fierro by José Hernández (1872)
- Idylls of the King by Alfred Tennyson (c. 1874)
- Clarel by Herman Melville (1876)
- The Story of Sigurd the Volsung and the Fall of the Niblungs by William Morris (1876)
- L'Atlàntida by Jacint Verdaguer (1877)
- The Light of Asia by Edwin Arnold (1879)
- The City of Dreadful Night by Bysshe Vanolis (finished in 1874, published in 1880)
- Tristram of Lyonesse by Algernon Charles Swinburne (1882)
- The Rape of Florida by Albery Allson Whitman (1884 later republished as Twasinta's Seminoles)
- Eros and Psyche by Robert Bridges (1885)
- La Fin de Satan by Victor Hugo (written between 1855 and 1860, published in 1886)
- Canigó by Jacint Verdaguer (1886)
- Lāčplēsis ('The Bear-Slayer') by Andrejs Pumpurs (1888; Latvian Mythology)
- Tabaré by Juan Zorrilla de San Martín (1888; national epic of Uruguay)
- The Wanderings of Oisin by William Butler Yeats (1889)
- Kotan Utunnai, Ainu epic, recorded in the 1880s, published in 1890
- Host and Guest by Vazha-Pshavela (1893)
- The 9th of July 1821 by Vasilis Michaelides (1893–1895; national epic of Cyprus written in Cypriot Greek)
- The Tale of Balen by Algernon Charles Swinburne (1896)
- Lục Vân Tiên by Nguyễn Đình Chiểu
- Amir Arsalan, narrated by Mohammad Ali Naqib al-Mamalek to the Qajar Shah of Persia

=== 20th century ===
- The Divine Enchantment by John Neihardt (1900)
- An Idyl of the South: An Epic Poem in Two Parts by Albery Allson Whitman (1901)
- Lahuta e Malcís by Gjergj Fishta (composed 1902–1937)
- Ural-batyr (Bashkirs oral tradition set in the written form by Mukhamedsha Burangulov in 1910)
- The Ballad of the White Horse by G. K. Chesterton (1911)
- Mensagem by Fernando Pessoa (composed 1913–1934)
- The Cantos by Ezra Pound (composed 1915–1969)
- Dorvyzhy, Udmurt national epic compiled in Russian by Mikhail Khudiakov (1920) basing on folklore works
- The Legend of Sigurd and Gudrún by J. R. R. Tolkien (composed 1920–1939, published 2009)
- A Cycle of the West by John Neihardt (composed 1921–1949)
- Brasileis by Augusto Meira (1923)
- The Odyssey: A Modern Sequel by Nikos Kazantzakis (Greek verse, composed 1924–1938)
- Dymer by C. S. Lewis (1926)
- "A" by Louis Zukofsky (composed 1927–1978)
- John Brown's Body by Stephen Vincent Benét (1928)
- The Fall of Arthur by J. R. R. Tolkien (composed c. 1930–1934, published 2013)
- The Bridge by Hart Crane (1930)
- Ariadne by F. L. Lucas (1932)
- Kamayani by Jaishankar Prasad (1936)
- The People, Yes by Carl Sandburg (1936)
- In Parenthesis by David Jones (1937)
- Canto General by Pablo Neruda (1938–1950)
- Os Brasileidas by Carlos Alberto da Costa Nunes (1938)
- Khamba Thoibi Sheireng (based on Khamba and Thoibi) by Hijam Anganghal (1940)
- Paterson by William Carlos Williams (composed c. 1940–1961)
- Sugata Saurabha by Chittadhar Hridaya (1941–1945)
- Victory for the Slain by Hugh John Lofting (1942)
- The Great South Land: An Epic Poem (1951) by Rex Ingamells
- Rashmirathi (1952), Hunkar by Ramdhari Singh Dinkar
- Savitri by Aurobindo Ghose (1950)
- The Maximus Poems by Charles Olson (composed 1950–1970)
- The Anathemata by David Jones (1952)
- Howl by Allen Ginsberg (composed 1954–1955)
- Aniara by Harry Martinson (composed 1956)
- Helen in Egypt by H.D. (1961)
- Os Peãs by Gerardo Mello Mourão (1963)
- Os Brasilíadas by Nagib Modad (1965)
- Song of Lawino by Okot p'Bitek (1966)
- Puerto Rican Obituary by Pedro Pietri (1971)
- Prussian Nights by Alexander Solzhenitsyn (1974)
- The Banner of Joan by H. Warner Munn (1975)
- Kristubhagavatam by P. C. Devassia (1976)
- Keralodayam Mahakavyam by K. N. Ezhuthachan (1977)
- The Changing Light at Sandover by James Merrill (composed 1976–1982)
- The Battlefield Where The Moon Says I Love You by Frank Stanford (published 1977)
- Emperor Shaka the Great by Mazisi Kunene (1979)
- The Lay of the Children of Húrin and The Lay of Leithian by J. R. R. Tolkien (published 1985)
- The New World by Frederick Turner (1985)
- Empire of Dreams by Giannina Braschi (1988)
- Omeros by Derek Walcott (1990)
- Genesis by Frederick Turner (1990)
- Arundhati by Jagadguru Rambhadracharya (1994)
- Mastorava by A. M. Sharonov (1994)
- Astronautilía Hvězdoplavba by Jan Křesadlo (1995)
- The Descent of Alette by Alice Notley (1996)
- The Alamo: An Epic by Michael Lind (1997)
- Autobiography of Red by Anne Carson (1998)
- Fredy Neptune: A Novel in Verse by Les Murray (1998)

=== 21st century ===
- Sribhargavaraghaviyam (2002), Ashtavakra (2009) and Gitaramayanam (2009–2010, published in 2011) by Jagadguru Rambhadracharya
- Solaris korrigert by Øyvind Rimbereid (2004)
- Lime Stone: An Epic Poem of Barbados (2008) by Anthony Kellman
- Zorgamazoo by Robert Paul Weston (2008)
- The Iovis Trilogy by Anne Waldman (2011)
- Our Lady of the Ruins by Traci Brimhall (2012)
- Brand New Ancients by Kae Tempest (2013)
- Apocalypse by Frederick Turner (2016)
- Vrata nepovrata by Boris A. Novak (2014-2017)
- Epoch: A Poetic Psy-Phi Saga by Dave Jilk (2024)<ref>"Battling boredom, Dave Jilk wrote an epic poem that almost defies description". coloradosun.com."Dave Jilk, Epoch: A Poetic Psy-Phi Saga". edblogs.columbia.edu.
- Epoch: 1517. Michelle and Diana by Stanislav Chernyshevich (2025)"long poem in Russia, The largest literary work in verse in Russian".

== Other epics ==
- Canaäd, an epic poem reconstructing Canaanite mythology, set during the Late Bronze Age.
- Epic of Bamana Segu, oral epic of the Bambara people, composed in the 19th century and recorded in the 20th century
- Epic of Darkness, tales and legends of primeval China
- Epic of Jangar, poem of the Oirat people
- Epic of Köroğlu, Turkic oral tradition written down mostly in 18th century
- Epic of Manas (18th century)
- Epic of the Forgotten, Bulgarian poetic saga
- Gesta Berengarii imperatoris
- Heavensfield, alliterative epic on the life of medieval king Oswald of Northumbria.
- Hikayat Seri Rama, Malay version of the Ramayana
- Hinilawod, Filipino epic from the island of Panay
- Hotsuma Tsutae
- Khun Chang Khun Phaen, a Thai poem
- Klei Khan Y Dam San, a Vietnamese poem
- Koti and Chennayya and Epic of Siri, Tulu poems
- Kutune Shirka, sacred yukar epic of the Ainu people of which several translations exist
- Lay of Mouse-fate (Musurdvitha), a fantasy epic inspired by animal fable and Arthurian legend.
- Mu'allaqat, Arabic poems written by seven poets in Classical Arabic, these poems are very similar to epic poems and specially the poem of Antarah ibn Shaddad
- Parsifal by Richard Wagner (opera, composed 1880–1882)
- Pasyón, Filipino religious epic, of which the 1703 and 1814 versions are popular
- Popol Vuh, history of the K'iche' people
- Ramakien, Thailand's national epic derived from the Ramayana
- Der Ring des Nibelungen by Richard Wagner (opera, composed 1848–1874)
- Siribhoovalaya, a unique work of multi-lingual literature written by Kumudendu Muni, a Jain monk
- Yadegar-e Zariran (Middle Persian)
- Yama Zatdaw, Burmese version of the Ramayana

== See also ==
- List of world folk-epics
- Indian epic poetry
