= Precepts of Chiron =

Ancient Greek didactic poem

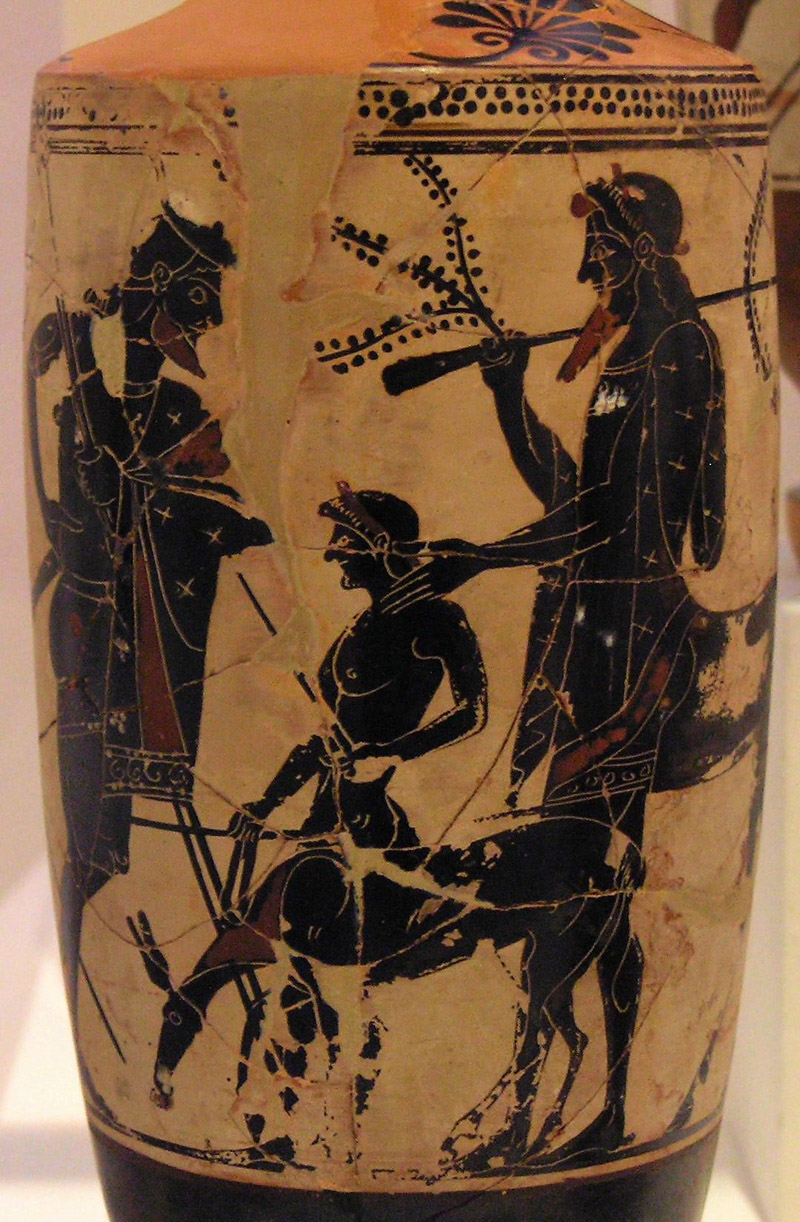
A lekythos taken to depict Peleus (left) entrusting his son Achilles (center) to the tutelage of Chiron (right), c. 500 BCE, National Archaeological Museum of Athens

The "Precepts of Chiron" (Ancient Greek: Χείρωνος ὑποθῆκαι, Cheírōnos hypothêkai) is a now fragmentary Greek didactic poem that was attributed to Hesiod during antiquity. The poem was presented in the voice of Chiron, the wise centaur, as he instructed a young Achilles. To judge from the few fragments that are preserved in other ancient authors, the hero's lessons consisted of moral, religious and practical advice. As such, the poem shows affinities not only with the Hesiodic Works and Days, with which it shared its hexameter verse form, but also with the gnomic elegies of Theognis.

A didactic poem, "Precepts of Chiron", part of the traditional education of Achilles, was considered to be among Hesiod's works by some of the later Greeks. The Romanized Greek traveller of the 2nd century CE, Pausanias, noted a list of Hesiod's works that were shown to him, engraved on an ancient and worn leaden tablet, by the tenders of the shrine at Helicon in Boeotia. But another, quite different tradition was upheld of Hesiod's works, Pausanias notes, which included the "Precepts of Chiron". Apparently it was among works from Acharnae written in heroic hexameters and attached to the famous name of Hesiod, for Pausanias adds "Those who hold this view also say that Hesiod was taught soothsaying by the Acharnians."

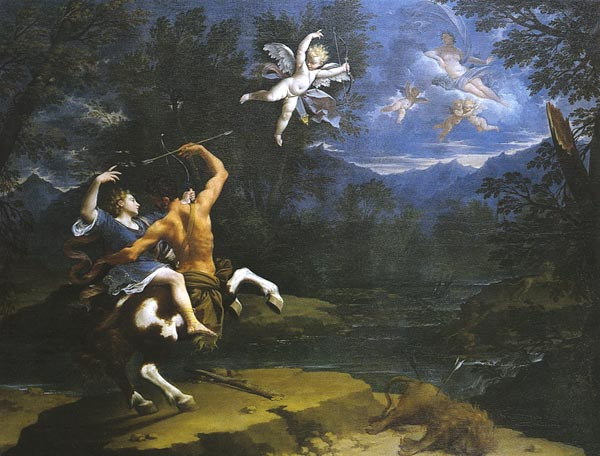
The Education of Achilles by Donato Creti, 1714 (Musei Civici d'Arte Antica, Bologna)

Though it has been lost, fragments in heroic hexameters that survive in quotations are considered to belong to it. The common thread in the fragments, which may reflect in some degree the Acharnian image of Chiron and his teaching, is that it is expository rather than narrative, and suggests that, rather than recounting the inspiring events of archaic times as men like Nestor or Glaucus might do, Chiron taught the primeval ways of mankind, the gods and nature, beginning with the caution "First, whenever you come to your house, offer good sacrifices to the eternal gods". Chiron in the "Precepts" considered that no child should have a literary education until he had reached the age of seven. A fragment associated with the "Precepts" concerns the span of life of the nymphs, in the form of an ancient number puzzle:

A chattering crow lives out nine generations of aged men, but a stag's life is four times a crow's, and a raven's life makes three stags old, while the phoenix outlives nine ravens, but we, the rich-haired Nymphs, daughters of Zeus the aegis-holder, outlive ten phoenixes.

In human terms, Chiron advises, "Decide no suit, until you have heard both sides speak".

The Alexandrian critic Aristophanes of Byzantium (late 3rd-early 2nd century BCE) was the first to deny that the "Precepts of Chiron" was the work of Hesiod.

== Select editions and translations ==
=== Critical editions ===
- Hesiodi, Eumeli, Cinaethonis, Asii et Carminis Naupactii fragmenta, Guil. Marckscheffel (ed.), Lipsiae, sumtibus Fr. Chr. Guil. Vogelii, 1840, pp. 370-1.
- Hesiodi carmina, Johann Friedrich Dübner (ed.), Parisiis, editore Ambrosio Firmin Didot, 1841, p. 61.
- Rzach, A. (1913), Hesiodi Carmina (3rd rev. ed.), Leipzig, ISBN 3-598-71418-1.
- Merkelbach, R.; West, M.L. (1967), Fragmenta Hesiodea, Oxford, ISBN 0-19-814171-8.
- Merkelbach, R.; West, M.L. (1990), "Fragmenta selecta", in F. Solmsen (ed.), Hesiodi Theogonia, Opera et Dies, Scutum (3rd rev. ed.), Oxford, ISBN 0-19-814071-1.

=== Translations ===
- Evelyn-White, H.G. (1936), Hesiod, the Homeric Hymns, and Homerica, Loeb Classical Library, vol. 57 (3rd rev. ed.), Cambridge, MA, ISBN 978-0-674-99063-0. (The link is to the 1st edition of 1914.)
- Most, G.W. (2006), Hesiod: Theogony, Works and Days, Testimonia, Loeb Classical Library, vol. 57, Cambridge, MA, ISBN 978-0-674-99622-9.
- Most, G.W. (2007), Hesiod: The Shield, Catalogue, Other Fragments, Loeb Classical Library, vol. 503, Cambridge, MA, ISBN 978-0-674-99623-6.

== Bibliography ==
- Cingano, E. (2009), "The Hesiodic Corpus", in Montanari, F.; Rengakos, A.; Tsagalis, C. (eds.), Brill's Companion to Hesiod, Leiden: Brill, ISBN 978-90-04-17840-3.
- Friedländer, P. (1913), "Ὑποθῆκαι", Hermes, 48: 558–616, JSTOR 4473419.
- Schwartz, J. (1960), Pseudo-Hesiodeia: recherches sur la composition, la diffusion et la disparition ancienne d'oeuvres attribuées à Hésiode, Leiden.
- West, M.L. (1966), Hesiod: Theogony, Oxford, ISBN 978-0-19-814169-3.
- West, M.L. (1978), Hesiod: Works & Days, Oxford, ISBN 0-19-814005-3.
