= Melampodia =

Greek epic poem attributed to Hesiod during antiquity

The "Melampodia" (Ancient Greek: Μελαμποδία) is a now fragmentary Greek epic poem that was attributed to Hesiod during antiquity. Its title is derived from the name of the great seer Melampus but must have included myths concerning other heroic seers, for it was at least three books long.

== Select editions and translations ==
=== Critical editions ===
- Hesiodi, Eumeli, Cinaethonis, Asii et Carminis Naupactii fragmenta, Guil. Marckscheffel (ed.), Lipsiae, sumtibus Fr. Chr. Guil. Vogelii, 1840, pp. 359-65.
- Hesiodi carmina, Johann Friedrich Dübner (ed.), Parisiis, editore Ambrosio Firmin Didot, 1841, pp. 59-61.
- Rzach, A. (1908), Hesiodi Carmina (2nd rev. ed.), Leipzig.
- Merkelbach, R.; West, M.L. (1967), Fragmenta Hesiodea, Oxford, ISBN 0-19-814171-8.
- Merkelbach, R.; West, M.L. (1990), "Fragmenta selecta", in F. Solmsen (ed.), Hesiodi Theogonia, Opera et Dies, Scutum (3rd rev. ed.), Oxford, ISBN 0-19-814071-1.

=== Translations ===
- Most, G.W. (2006), Hesiod: Theogony, Works and Days, Testimonia, Loeb Classical Library, vol. 57, Cambridge, Massachusetts, ISBN 978-0-674-99622-9.
- Most, G.W., Hesiod: The Shield, Catalogue of Women, Other Fragments, Loeb Classical Library, No. 503, Cambridge, Massachusetts, Harvard University Press, 2007, 2018. ISBN 978-0-674-99721-9. Online version at Harvard University Press.

== Bibliography ==
- Cingano, E. (2009), "The Hesiodic Corpus", in Montanari; Rengakos; Tsagalis (eds.), Brill's Companion to Hesiod, pp. 91–130.
- Hopkinson, N. (1988), A Hellenistic Anthology, Cambridge, ISBN 978-0-521-31425-1.
- Löffler, I. (1963), Die Melampodie: Versuch einer Rekonstruktion des Inhalts, Meisenheim am Glan.
- Montanari, F.; Rengakos, A.; Tsagalis, C. (2009), Brill's Companion to Hesiod, Leiden, ISBN 978-90-04-17840-3.
- Schwartz, J. (1960), Pseudo-Hesiodeia: recherches sur la composition, la diffusion et la disparition ancienne d'oeuvres attribuées à Hésiode, Leiden.
- West, M.L. (1965), "Reviewed work: Die Melampodie, Ingrid Löffler", The Classical Review, 15 (1): 110–11, doi:10.1017/S0009840X00219409, JSTOR 710132, S2CID 162996953.
- West, M.L. (1978), Hesiod: Works & Days, Oxford, ISBN 0-19-814005-3.
