= Aegimius (poem) =

Epic poem traditioanlly attributed to Hesiod

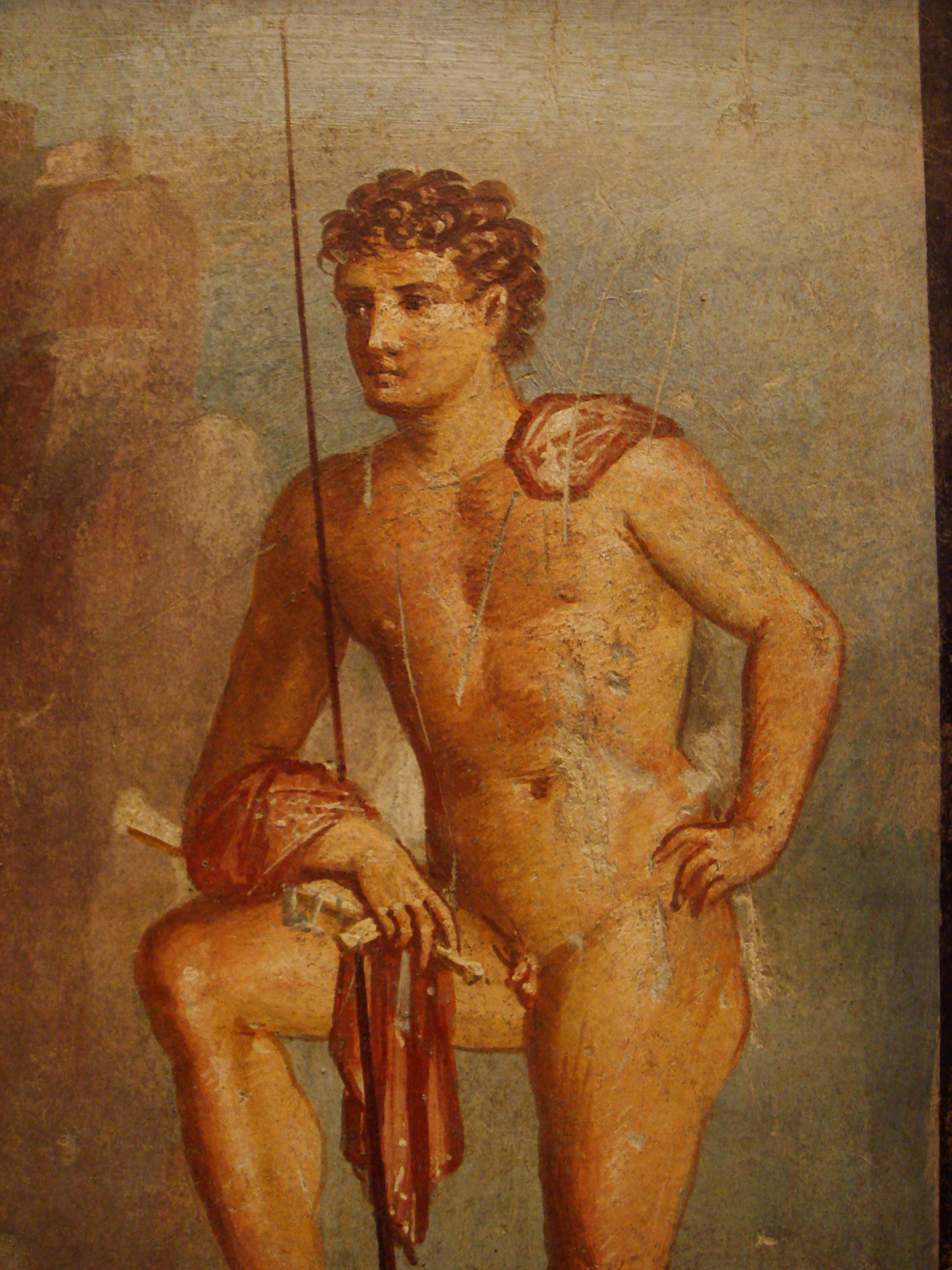
A depiction of a myth that figured prominently in the Aegimius: Argus Panoptes watches Io (not pictured) in a detail of a 1st-century CE fresco from Pompeii (Naples National Archaeological Museum).

The "Aegimius" (Ancient Greek: Αἰγίμιος, Aigimios) is a fragmentary Ancient Greek epic poem that was variously attributed to Hesiod or Cercops of Miletus during antiquity. The "Aegimius" of the title was surely the son of Dorus, but the surviving fragments have nothing to do directly with this figure, and, despite his status as title character, it cannot be inferred from the available evidence that the poem was primarily concerned with the Dorian king. Instead other myths, such as those concerning Io, Theseus, and the Golden Fleece, are found among the handful of fragments preserved in other ancient authors as quotations and paraphrases.

== Content ==
Next to nothing is known of poem's overarching plot or structure aside from the fact that it was at least two books in length: Stephanus of Byzantium and the scholia to Apollonius of Rhodes preserve fragments which they assign to "the second book of the Aegimius". One of the fragments cited for book 2 relates the gruesome story that Thetis cast numerous of her children by Peleus into a cauldron of boiling water to see whether they were mortal, before her husband intervened in the case of Achilles. Other isolated fragments concern the Graeae (fr. 295), Nauplius (fr. 297), Phrixus (fr. 299) and a rare Greek word for a "cool shady place" (ψυκτήριον, psyktērion) found in a context-less hexameter quoted by Athenaeus (Deipnosophistae 11.109.503c–d = fr. 301):

ἔνθά ποτ' ἔσται ἐμὸν ψυκτήριον, ὄρχαμε λαῶν

Translation:

One day my cool shady place will be here, leader of men

The small scraps of information found in these fragments represent most of our knowledge of the Aegimius' content, but the poem's greatest points of literary historical interest are found in its treatments of the myths of Io and Theseus.

== Authorship ==
If the story of Heracles' participation in Aegimius' battle with the Lapiths played a major role in the Aegimius, it is possible the great hero's prominence in the poem contributed to its being attributed to Hesiod, for the remains of three other poems anciently credited to him—the Shield of Heracles, Megalai Ehoiai and Wedding of Ceyx—betray a preoccupation with Heracles.

== Select editions and translations ==
=== Critical editions ===
- Hesiodi, Eumeli, Cinaethonis, Asii et Carminis Naupactii fragmenta, Guil. Marckscheffel (ed.), Lipsiae, sumtibus Fr. Chr. Guil. Vogelii, 1840, pp. 347-51.
- Hesiodi carmina, Johann Friedrich Dübner (ed.), Parisiis, editore Ambrosio Firmin Didot, 1841, pp. 47-8.
- Rzach, A. (1908), Hesiodi Carmina (2nd rev. ed.), Leipzig.
- Merkelbach, R.; West, M.L. (1967), Fragmenta Hesiodea, Oxford, ISBN 0-19-814171-8.
- Merkelbach, R.; West, M.L. (1990), "Fragmenta selecta", in F. Solmsen (ed.), Hesiodi Theogonia, Opera et Dies, Scutum (3rd rev. ed.), Oxford, ISBN 0-19-814071-1.

=== Translations ===
- Evelyn-White, H.G. (1936), Hesiod, the Homeric Hymns, and Homerica, Loeb Classical Library, vol. 57 (3rd rev. ed.), Cambridge, MA, ISBN 978-0-674-99063-0. (The link is to the 1st edition of 1914.)
- Most, G.W. (2006), Hesiod: Theogony, Works and Days, Testimonia, Loeb Classical Library, vol. 57, Cambridge, MA, ISBN 978-0-674-99622-9.
- Most, G.W. (2007), Hesiod: The Shield, Catalogue, Other Fragments, Loeb Classical Library, vol. 503, Cambridge, MA, ISBN 978-0-674-99623-6.

== Bibliography ==
- Cingano, E. (2009), Montanari; Rengakos; Tsagalis (eds.), The Hesiodic Corpus, pp. 91–130.
- Evelyn-White, H.G. (1924), "A Peisistratean Edition of the Hesiodic Poems", The Classical Quarterly, 18 (3/4): 142–50, doi:10.1017/S000983880000700X, JSTOR 636108, S2CID 170747885.
- Mitchell, L.G. (2001), "Euboean Io", The Classical Quarterly, 51 (2): 339–52, doi:10.1093/cq/51.2.339, hdl:10036/49253, JSTOR 3556513.
- Montanari, F.; Rengakos, A.; Tsagalis, C. (2009), Brill's Companion to Hesiod, Leiden, ISBN 978-90-04-17840-3.
- Schwartz, J. (1960), Pseudo-Hesiodeia: recherches sur la composition, la diffusion et la disparition ancienne d'oeuvres attribuées à Hésiode, Leiden.
- Sinclair, T.A. (1927), "The So-Called Peisistratean Edition of Hesiod", The Classical Quarterly, 21 (3/4): 195–8, doi:10.1017/S0009838800001312, JSTOR 636401, S2CID 171006705.
- West, M.L. (1966), Hesiod: Theogony, Oxford, ISBN 978-0-19-814169-3.
- West, M.L. (1985), The Hesiodic Catalogue of Women: Its Nature, Structure, and Origins, Oxford, ISBN 0-19-814034-7
