= Descent of Perithous =

Fragmentary epic poem

The "Descent of Perithous" (Ancient Greek: Πειρίθου κατάβασις, Peirithou katabasis) is a fragmentary epic poem that was ascribed to Hesiod by the 2nd-century CE geographer Pausanias. The eponymous topic of the poem would have been the myth of Theseus and Perithous' trip to Hades seeking to win Persephone as bride for Perithous.

Along with the "Wedding of Ceyx" and Aegimus, the "Descent of Perithous" has been considered a poetic narrative by Hesiod that was Muse-inspired. During the expedition, Hades trapped the heroes by seating them in the "chairs of forgetfullness", and only Heracles could save them. The poem is narrated by the ghost of Meleager. One tentatively assigned papyrus fragment survives which includes a conversation between Meleager and Theseus. In this dialogue, the ghosts were talking about how Theseus and Perithous descended to carry off Persephone, a tale Meleager listened to with disgust. It is also proposed that this fragment belongs to the Minyas, and the existence of an independent Hesiodic poem on the descent of Theseus and Perithous is complicated by the fact that elsewhere Pausanias attributes the myth to the Minyas. The sheer number of Hesiodic papyri that have survived compared to those of other works of archaic epic, however, lends credence to the attribution to the Hesiodic corpus.

== Select editions and translations ==
=== Critical editions ===
- Merkelbach, R.; West, M.L. (1967), Fragmenta Hesiodea, Oxford: Oxford University Press, ISBN 0-19-814171-8.
- Merkelbach, R.; West, M.L. (1990), "Fragmenta selecta", in F. Solmsen (ed.), Hesiodi Theogonia, Opera et Dies, Scutum (3rd rev. ed.), Oxford: Clarendon Press, ISBN 0-19-814071-1.

=== Translations ===
- Most, G.W. (2006), Hesiod: Theogony, Works and Days, Testimonia, Loeb Classical Library no. 57, Cambridge, MA: Harvard University Press, ISBN 978-0-674-99622-9.
- Most, G.W. (2007), Hesiod: The Shield, Catalogue, Other Fragments, Loeb Classical Library no. 503, Cambridge, MA: Harvard University Press, ISBN 978-0-674-99623-6.

== Bibliography ==
- Cingano, E. (2009), "The Hesiodic Corpus", in Montanari; Rengakos; Tsagalis (eds.), Brill's Companion to Hesiod, pp. 91–130.
- Montanari, F.; Rengakos, A.; Tsagalis, C. (2009), Brill's Companion to Hesiod, Leiden: Brill, ISBN 978-9004-17840-3.
- Schwartz, J. (1960), Pseudo-Hesiodeia: recherches sur la composition, la diffusion et la disparition ancienne d'oeuvres attribuées à Hésiode, Leiden: Ε. J. Brill.
- West, M.L. (2003), Greek Epic Fragments, Loeb Classical Library no. 497, Cambridge, MA: Harvard University Press, ISBN 978-0-674-99605-2.
