= Megala Erga =

Didactic poem attributed to Greek oral poet Hesiod

The "Megala Erga" (Ancient Greek: Μέγαλα Ἔργα), or "Great Works", is a now fragmentary didactic poem that was attributed to the Greek oral poet Hesiod during antiquity. Only two brief direct quotations can be attributed to the work with certainty, but it was likely similar to the Hesiodic Works and Days, with the "Megala", "great", of the title implying that it was longer than the extant poem. As such, the Megala Erga would appear to have the same relation to the Works and Days as does the Megalai Ehoiai to the Catalogue of Women.

Although the remains of the poem found in other ancient authors are meager, it can be said that the Megala Erga appears to have been concerned with both morality and the conveyance of more-or-less practical information like the extant Hesiodic poem upon which its title drew. The scholia to the Myth of the Ages in the Works and Days, à propos of the Race of Silver (WD 128), reports that in the Megala Erga a genealogy for silver was given: it was a descendant of Gaia. The other securely attributed fragment resembles many of the gnomic utterances that characterize the Works and Days:

If someone sowed evils, he would reap evil profits;
if he suffered what he committed, the judgement would be straight

εἰ κακά τις σπείραι, κακὰ κέρδεά <κεκ'> ἀμήσειεν·
εἴ κε πάθοι, τά τ' ἔρεξε, δίκη κ' ἰθεῖα γένοιτο

Other fragments that have been tentatively assigned to the poem concern the strengths man possesses at different points in his life (fr. 321), religious practices (fr. 322) and filial piety (fr. 323).

== Select editions and translations ==
=== Critical editions ===
- Rzach, A. (1908), Hesiodi Carmina (2nd rev. ed.), Leipzig.
- Merkelbach, R.; West, M.L. (1967), Fragmenta Hesiodea, Oxford, ISBN 0-19-814171-8.
- Merkelbach, R.; West, M.L. (1990), "Fragmenta selecta", in F. Solmsen (ed.), Hesiodi Theogonia, Opera et Dies, Scutum (3rd rev. ed.), Oxford, ISBN 0-19-814071-1.

=== Translations ===
- Evelyn-White, H.G. (1936), Hesiod, the Homeric Hymns, and Homerica, Loeb Classical Library, vol. 57 (3rd rev. ed.), Cambridge, MA, ISBN 978-0-674-99063-0. (The link is to the 1st edition of 1914.)
- Most, G.W. (2006), Hesiod: Theogony, Works and Days, Testimonia, Loeb Classical Library, vol. 57, Cambridge, MA, ISBN 978-0-674-99622-9.
- Most, G.W. (2007), Hesiod: The Shield, Catalogue, Other Fragments, Loeb Classical Library, vol. 503, Cambridge, MA, ISBN 978-0-674-99623-6.

== Bibliography ==
- Cingano, E. (2009), "The Hesiodic Corpus", in Montanari; Rengakos; Tsagalis (eds.), Brill's Companion to Hesiod, pp. 91–130.
- Montanari, F.; Rengakos, A.; Tsagalis, C. (2009), Brill's Companion to Hesiod, Leiden, ISBN 978-90-04-17840-3.
- Schwartz, J. (1960), Pseudo-Hesiodeia: recherches sur la composition, la diffusion et la disparition ancienne d'oeuvres attribuées à Hésiode, Leiden.
- West, M.L. (1978), Hesiod: Works & Days, Oxford, ISBN 0-19-814005-3.
