= Astronomia (poem) =

Fragmentary Ancient Greek hexameter poem

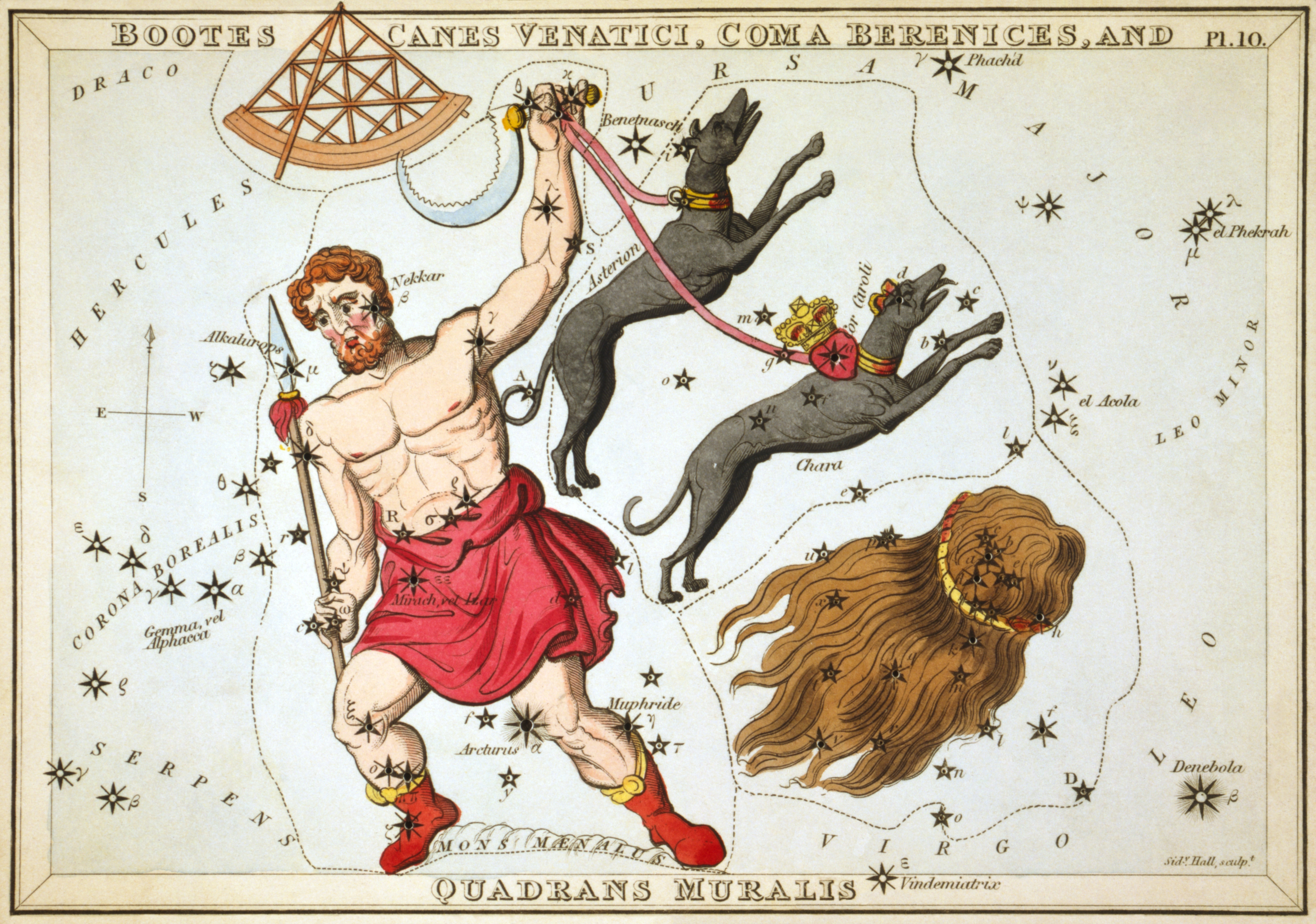
Boötes (in pink), a constellation described in the Astronomia (from Urania's Mirror)

The "Astronomia" (Ancient Greek: Ἀστρονομία, "Astronomy") or "Astrologia" (Ἀστρολογία, also "Astronomy") is a fragmentary Ancient Greek hexameter poem that was attributed to Hesiod during antiquity. As the title of the poem suggests, it was astronomical in focus, dealing with the stars. It has been suspected that the Astronomia influenced the style of Aratus' Phaenomena, but the remains of the Hesiodic poem found in ancient quotations are too meager to allow for certainty on this matter.

== Title and authorship ==
While it is uncertain whether the work ought to be called the Astronomia or Astrologia, either title would translate into English as "astronomy". Athenaeus, who preserves three verbatim fragments of the poem, calls it the Astronomia, as does George Hamartolos (9th century AD). Plutarch and Pliny the Elder, on the other hand, give Astrologia. The 12th century AD poet and scholar Tzetzes struck his own course, preferring a periphrasis: βίβλος ἀστρική (biblos astrikē), "starry book".

All these sources do agree on one point: there survives from antiquity no expression of doubt as to whether Hesiod wrote the Astronomia. Scholars of the 19th century, however, argued against Hesiodic authorship, going so far as to assign the poem to the Hellenistic Period following the work of Eudoxus. Whether the transmitted fragments can be considered archaic or not, their small number and uninformative context leave open the possibility that they belonged to an expanded version of the Works and Days, for the fragments' contents—the paths of the stars and their significance—betray a similarity to the astronomical advice in that poem that is, in the opinion of one modern scholar, "obvious."

== Content ==
Most of the surviving content of the Astronomia concerns two star groups: the Pleiades and the Hyades.

== Reception ==
The earliest likely reference to the Astronomia was no ringing endorsement. The author of the Epinomis states that no man should be called an astronomer if he, like "Hesiod", simply studied the risings and settings of the stars.

== Select editions and translations ==
=== Critical editions ===
- Hesiodi, Eumeli, Cinaethonis, Asii et Carminis Naupactii fragmenta, Guil. Marckscheffel (ed.), Lipsiae, sumtibus Fr. Chr. Guil. Vogelii, 1840, pp. 352-9.
- Hesiodi carmina, Johann Friedrich Dübner (ed.), Parisiis, editore Ambrosio Firmin Didot, 1841, p. 48.
- Rzach, A. (1908), Hesiodi Carmina (2nd rev. ed.), Leipzig: B.G. Teubneri.
- Merkelbach, R.; West, M.L. (1967), Fragmenta Hesiodea, Oxford: Oxford University Press, ISBN 0-19-814171-8.
- Merkelbach, R.; West, M.L. (1990), "Fragmenta selecta", in F. Solmsen (ed.), Hesiodi Theogonia, Opera et Dies, Scutum (3rd rev. ed.), Oxford: Clarendon Press, ISBN 0-19-814071-1.

=== Translations ===
- Hesiod (1936), Hesiod, the Homeric Hymns, and Homerica, Loeb Classical Library, vol. 57, translated by Evelyn-White, H.G. (3rd rev. ed.), Cambridge, MA: Harvard University Press, ISBN 978-0-674-99063-0. (The link is to the 1st edition of 1914.)
- Most, G.W., ed. (2006), Hesiod: Theogony, Works and Days, Testimonia, Loeb Classical Library, vol. 57, translated by Most, Cambridge, MA: Harvard University Press, ISBN 978-0-674-99622-9.
- Most, G.W. (2007), Hesiod: The Shield, Catalogue, Other Fragments, Loeb Classical Library, vol. 503, Cambridge, MA: Harvard University Press, ISBN 978-0-674-99623-6.

== Bibliography ==
- Cingano, E. (2009), "The Hesiodic Corpus", in Montanari; Rengakos; Tsagalis (eds.), Brill's Companion to Hesiod, Brill, pp. 91–130, ISBN 978-90-04-17840-3.
- Hopkinson, N., ed. (1988), A Hellenistic Anthology, Cambridge: Cambridge University Press, ISBN 978-0-521-31425-1.
- Montanari, F.; Rengakos, A.; Tsagalis, C. (2009), Brill's Companion to Hesiod, Leiden: Brill, ISBN 978-90-04-17840-3.
- Schwartz, J. (1960), Pseudo-Hesiodeia: recherches sur la composition, la diffusion et la disparition ancienne d'oeuvres attribuées à Hésiode, Leiden: Ε. J. Brill.
- West, M.L. (1978), Hesiod: Works & Days, Oxford: Clarendon Press, ISBN 0-19-814005-3.
