= Hesiod =

Ancient Greek poet of the archaic period

- Ἡσίοδος
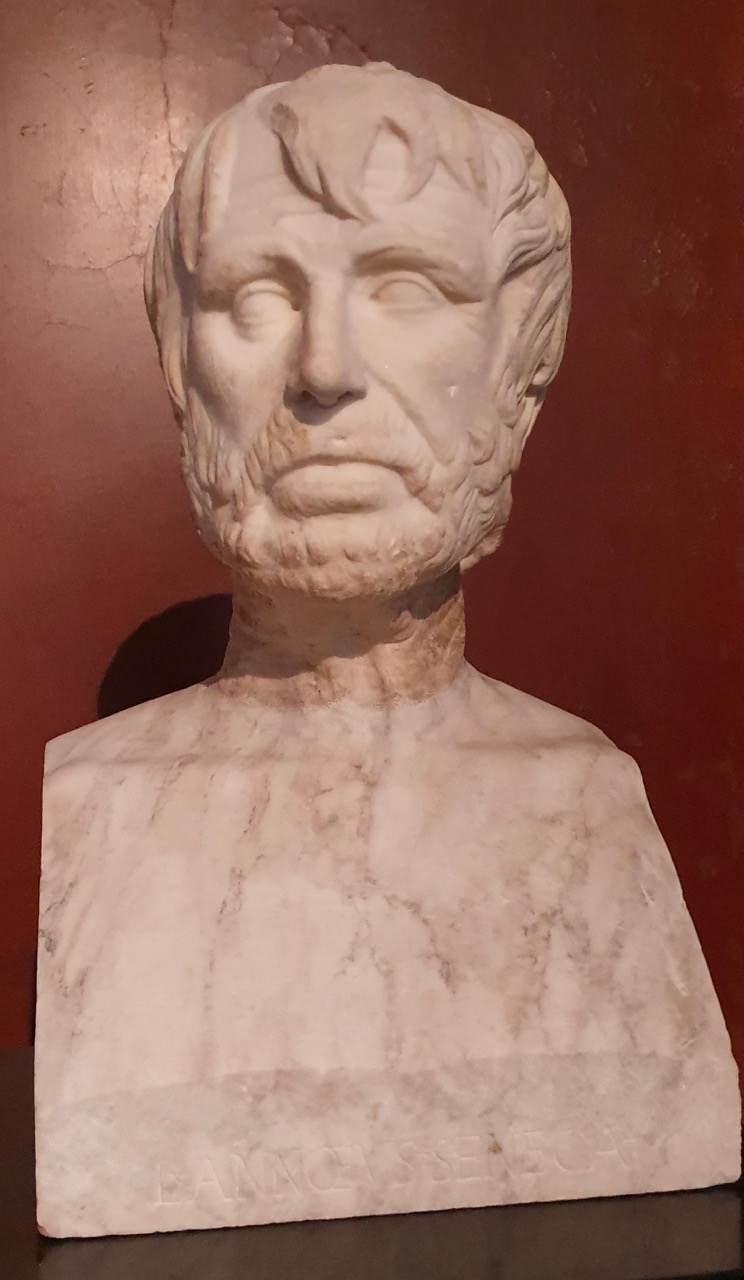
- A possible imaginative depiction of Hesiod (Roman copy of a Greek original)
- Occupations: Poet; philosopher; farmer
- Writing career
- Language: Ancient Greek
- Years active: c. 750-650 BC
- Notable works: Works and Days; Theogony

Hesiod (/ˈhiːsiəd/ HEE-see-əd or /ˈhɛsiəd/ HEH-see-əd; Ancient Greek: Ἡσίοδος Hēsíodos; fl. c. 700 BC) was an Ancient Greek poet generally thought to have been active between 750 and 650 BC, around the same time as Homer.

Several of Hesiod's works have survived in their entirety. Among these are Theogony, which tells the origins of the gods, their lineages, and the events that led to Zeus's rise to power, and Works and Days, a poem that describes the five Ages of Man, offers advice and wisdom, and includes myths such as Pandora's box.

Hesiod is generally regarded by Western authors as 'the first written poet in the Western tradition to regard himself as an individual persona with an active role to play in his subject.' Ancient authors credited Hesiod and Homer with establishing Greek religious customs. Modern scholars refer to him as a major source on Greek mythology, farming techniques, early economic thought, Archaic Greek astronomy, cosmology, and ancient time-keeping.

== Name ==
The etymology of Ἡσίοδος (Hēsíodos) is uncertain. The name is generally analysed as a compound whose second element is -odos, but neither element has been securely identified, and Robert S. P. Beekes classifies it as of unknown origin. Alternative dialect forms are attested: Aeolic Αἰσίοδος and Boeotian Εἱσίοδος.

The second element has been taken either as ὁδός (hodós, "road, way") or as a reflex of the root of αὐδή (audḗ, "voice"), the latter presupposing an earlier form *Hēsíwodos. Hjalmar Frisk, following Felix Solmsen, derived the first element from ἵημι (híēmi, "to send forth"), giving a sense such as "he who strikes up the song". Gregory Nagy reconstructs the name as *hēsi-wodos, "he who emits the voice", and, noting that it is scarcely attested for anyone other than the poet and that Ἡσι- is not otherwise productive as a first element in Greek compound names, treats it as a descriptive name for a poetic persona rather than as an ordinary personal name. Michael Meier-Brügger instead retains ὁδός and derives the first element from the root of ἥδομαι (hḗdomai, "to take pleasure"), yielding "he who takes pleasure in the journey"; Glenn W. Most likewise derives the name from ἥδομαι. Jenny Strauss Clay observes that Nagy's analysis would have to account for other names in Ἡσι-, such as Ἡσιόνη (Hesione), and concludes that it is not necessary to deny all historicity to the poet on these grounds.

== Life ==
The dating of Hesiod's life is a contested issue in scholarly circles (see § Dating below). Epic narrative allowed poets such as Homer no opportunity for personal revelations. However Hesiod's extant work comprises several didactic poems in which he went out of his way to let his audience in on a few details of his life. There are three explicit references in Works and Days, as well as some passages in his Theogony, that support inferences made by scholars. The former poem says that his father came from Cyme in Aeolis (on the coast of Anatolia, a little south of the island of Lesbos) and crossed the sea to settle at a hamlet near Thespiae in Boeotia named Ascra, "a cursed place, cruel in winter, hard in summer, never pleasant" (Works 640). Hesiod's patrimony (property inherited from one's father or male ancestor) in Ascra, a small piece of ground at the foot of Mount Helicon, occasioned lawsuits with his brother Perses, who at first seems to have cheated him of his rightful share thanks to corrupt authorities or ‘kings’ but later became impoverished and ended up scrounging from the thrifty poet (Works 35, 396).

Unlike his father Hesiod was averse to sea travel, but he once crossed the narrow strait between the Greek mainland and Euboea to participate in funeral celebrations for one Amphidamas of Chalcis and there won a tripod in a singing competition. He also describes meeting the Muses on Mount Helicon, where he had been pasturing sheep, when the goddesses presented him with a laurel staff, a symbol of poetic authority (Theogony 22–35). Fanciful though the story might seem, the account has led ancient and modern scholars to infer that he was not a professionally trained rhapsode or he would have been presented with a lyre instead. (Note: See discussion by M. L. West, Hesiod: Theogony, Oxford University Press (1966), p. 163 f., note 30, citing for example Pausanias IX, 30.3. Rhapsodes in post-Homeric times are often shown carrying either a laurel staff or a lyre but in Hesiod's earlier time the staff seems to indicate that he was not a rhapsode, a professional minstrel. Meetings between poets and the Muses became part of poetic folklore: compare, for example, Archilochus' account of meeting the Muses while leading home a cow and the legend of Cædmon.)

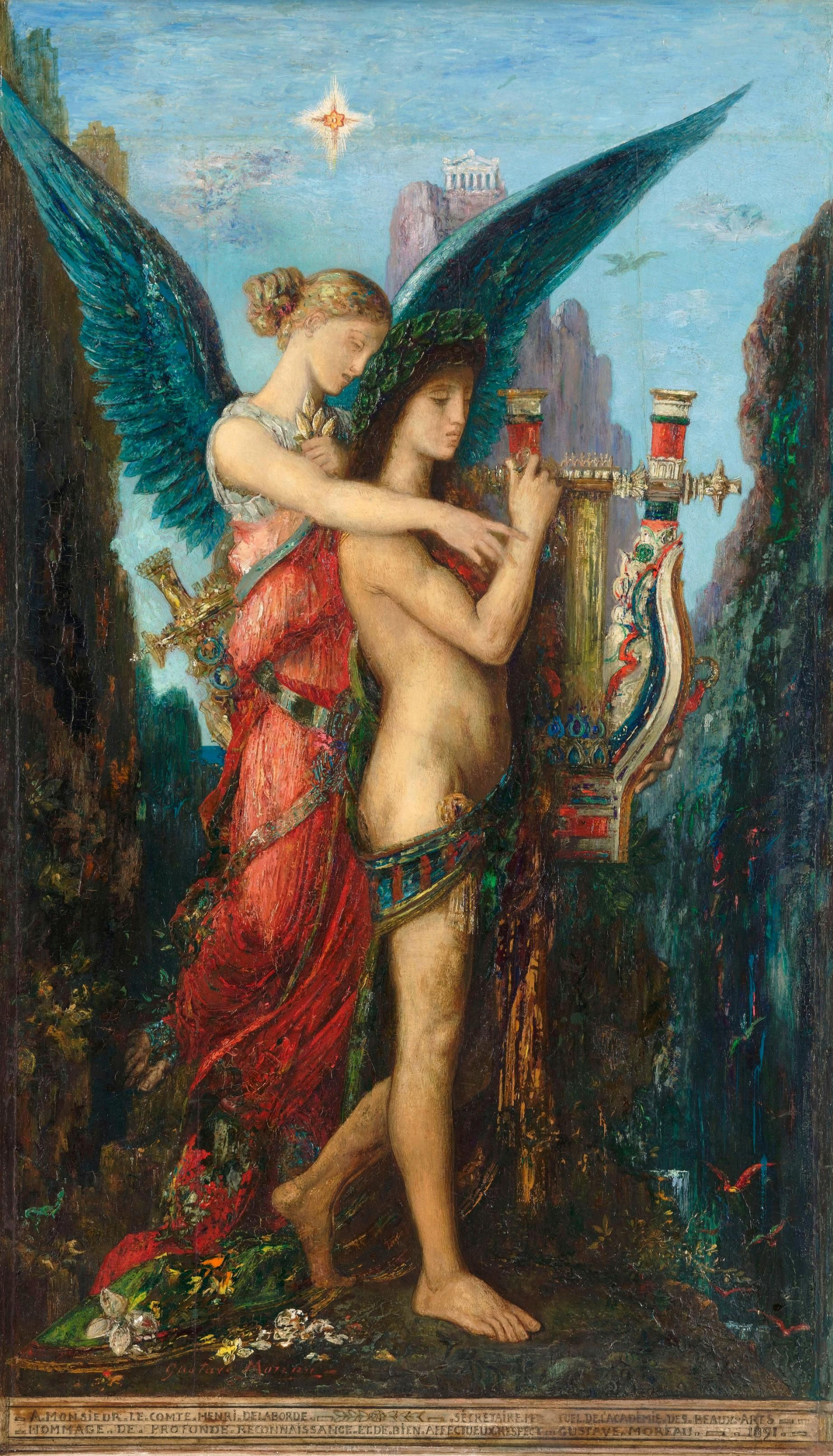
Hesiod and the Muse (1891), by Gustave Moreau. The poet is presented with a lyre, in contradiction to the account given by Hesiod himself, in which the gift was a laurel staff.

Some scholars have seen Perses as a literary creation, a foil for the moralizing that Hesiod develops in Works and Days, but there are also arguments against that theory. For example, it is quite common for works of moral instruction to have an imaginative setting as a means of getting the audience's attention, (Note: Jasper Griffin, 'Greek Myth and Hesiod' in The Oxford History of the Classical World, Oxford University Press (1986), cites for example the Book of Ecclesiastes, a Sumerian text in the form of a father's remonstrance with a prodigal son, and Egyptian wisdom texts spoken by viziers, etc. Hesiod was certainly open to oriental influences, as is clear in the myths presented by him in Theogony.) but it could be difficult to see how Hesiod could have traveled around the countryside entertaining people with a narrative about himself if the account was known to be fictitious. Gregory Nagy, on the other hand, sees both Pérsēs ("the destroyer" from πέρθω, pérthō) and Hēsíodos as fictitious names for poetical personae (see § Name above).

It might seem unusual that Hesiod's father migrated from Anatolia westwards to mainland Greece, the opposite direction to most colonial movements at the time, and Hesiod himself gives no explanation for it. However, around 750 BC or a little later, there was a migration of seagoing merchants from his original home in Cyme in Anatolia to Cumae in Campania (a colony they shared with the Euboeans), and possibly his move west had something to do with that, since Euboea is not far from Boeotia, where he eventually established himself and his family. The family association with Aeolian Cyme might explain his familiarity with Eastern myths, evident in his poems, though the Greek world might have already developed its own versions of them.

In spite of Hesiod's complaints about poverty, life on his father's farm could not have been too uncomfortable if Works and Days is anything to judge by, since he describes the routines of prosperous yeomanry rather than peasants. His farmer employs a friend (Works and Days 370) as well as servants (502, 573, 597, 608, 766), an energetic and responsible ploughman of mature years (469 ff.), a slave boy to cover the seed (441–6), a female servant to keep house (405, 602) and working teams of oxen and mules (405, 607f.). One modern scholar surmises that Hesiod may have learned about world geography, especially the catalogue of rivers in Theogony (337–45), listening to his father's accounts of his own sea voyages as a merchant. The father probably spoke in the Aeolian dialect of Cyme but Hesiod probably grew up speaking the local Boeotian, belonging to the same dialect group. However whilst his poetry features some Aeolisms there are no words that are certainly Boeotian. His basic language was the main literary dialect of the time, Homer's Ionian.

It is probable that Hesiod wrote his poems down, or dictated them, rather than passing them on orally, as rhapsodes did; otherwise, the pronounced personality that now emerges from the poems would surely have been diluted through oral transmission from one rhapsode to another. Pausanias asserted that Boeotians showed him an old tablet made of lead on which the Works were engraved. If he did write or dictate, it was perhaps as an aid to memory or because he lacked confidence in his ability to produce poems extempore, as trained rhapsodes could do. It certainly was not in a quest for immortal fame since poets in his era had probably no such notions for themselves. However, some scholars suspect the presence of large-scale changes in the text and attribute it to oral transmission. Possibly he composed his verses during idle times on the farm, in the spring before the May harvest or in the dead of winter.

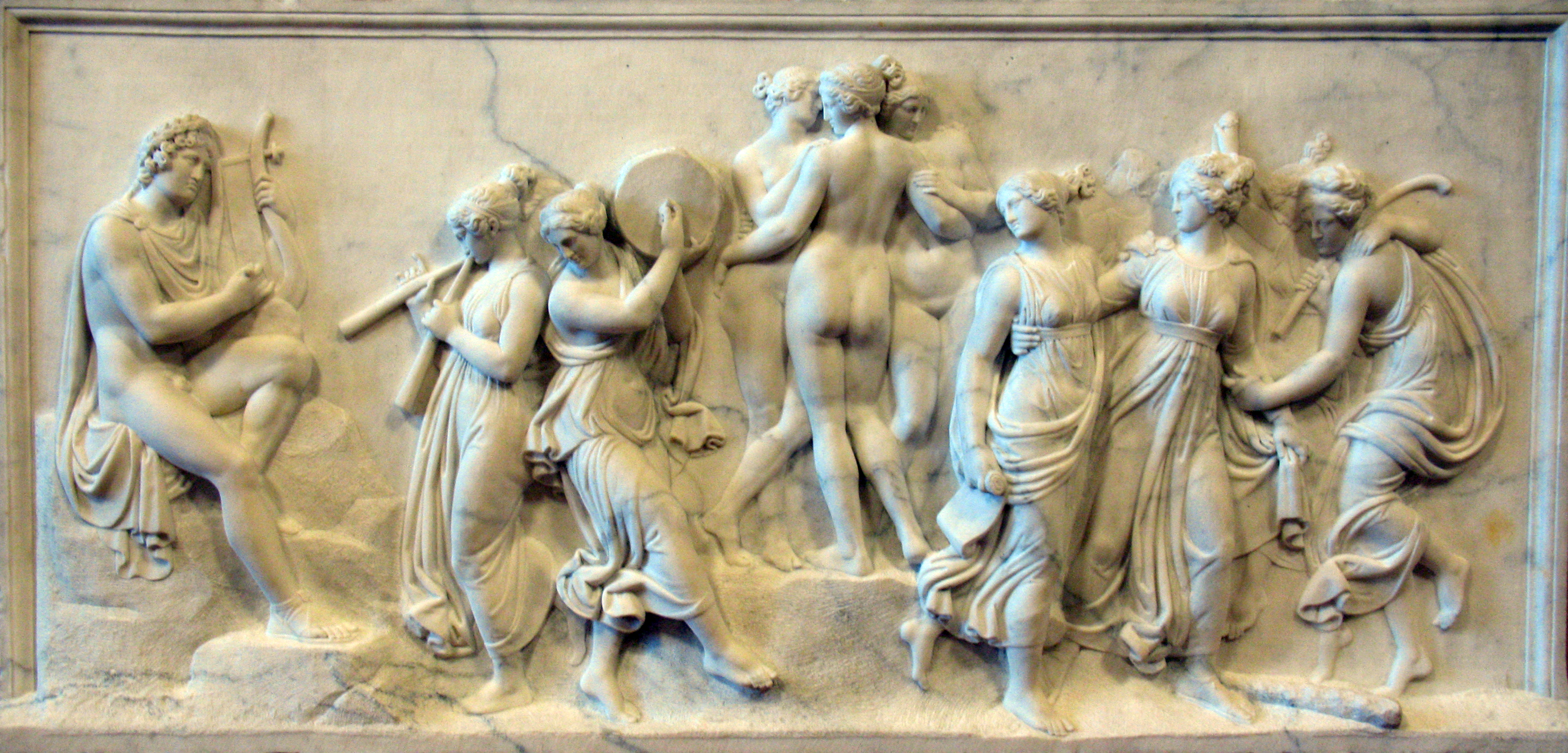
The Dance of the Muses at Mount Helicon by Bertel Thorvaldsen (1807). Hesiod cites inspiration from the Muses while on Mount Helicon.

The personality behind the poems is unsuited to the kind of "aristocratic withdrawal" typical of a rhapsode but is instead "argumentative, suspicious, ironically humorous, frugal, fond of proverbs, wary of women." He was in fact a "misogynist" of the same calibre as the later poet Semonides. He resembles Solon in his preoccupation with issues of good versus evil and "how a just and all-powerful god can allow the unjust to flourish in this life". He recalls Aristophanes in his rejection of the idealised hero of epic literature in favour of an idealized view of the farmer. Yet the fact that he could eulogize kings in Theogony (80 ff., 430, 434) and denounce them as corrupt in Works and Days suggests that he could resemble whichever audience he composed for.

Various legends accumulated about Hesiod and they are recorded in several sources:

- the story about the Contest of Homer and Hesiod;
- a vita of Hesiod by the Byzantine grammarian John Tzetzes;
- the entry for Hesiod in the Suda;
- two passages and some scattered remarks in Pausanias (IX, 31.3–6 and 38.3 f.);
- a passage in Plutarch Moralia (162b).

=== Death ===
Two different—yet early—traditions record the site of Hesiod's grave. One, as early as Thucydides, reported in Plutarch, the Suda and John Tzetzes, states that the Delphic oracle warned Hesiod that he would die in Nemea, and so he fled to Locris, where he was killed at the local temple to Nemean Zeus, and buried there. This tradition follows a familiar ironic convention: the oracle predicts accurately after all.

The other tradition, first mentioned in an epigram by Chersias of Orchomenus written in the 7th century BC (within a century or so of Hesiod's death), claims that Hesiod lies buried at Orchomenus, a town in Boeotia. According to Aristotle's Constitution of Orchomenus, when the Thespians ravaged Ascra the villagers sought refuge at Orchomenus, where, following the advice of an oracle, they collected the ashes of Hesiod and set them in a place of honour in their agora, next to the tomb of Minyas, their eponymous founder. Eventually they came to regard Hesiod too as their "hearth-founder" (οἰκιστής, oikistēs). Later writers attempted to harmonize these two accounts.

Yet another account taken from classical sources, cited by author Charles Abraham Elton in his Remains of Hesiod the Ascræan, Including the Shield of Hercules by Hesiod, depicts Hesiod as being falsely accused of rape by a girl's brothers and murdered in reprisal despite his advanced age, while the true culprit (his Milesian fellow-traveler) managed to escape.

=== Dating ===
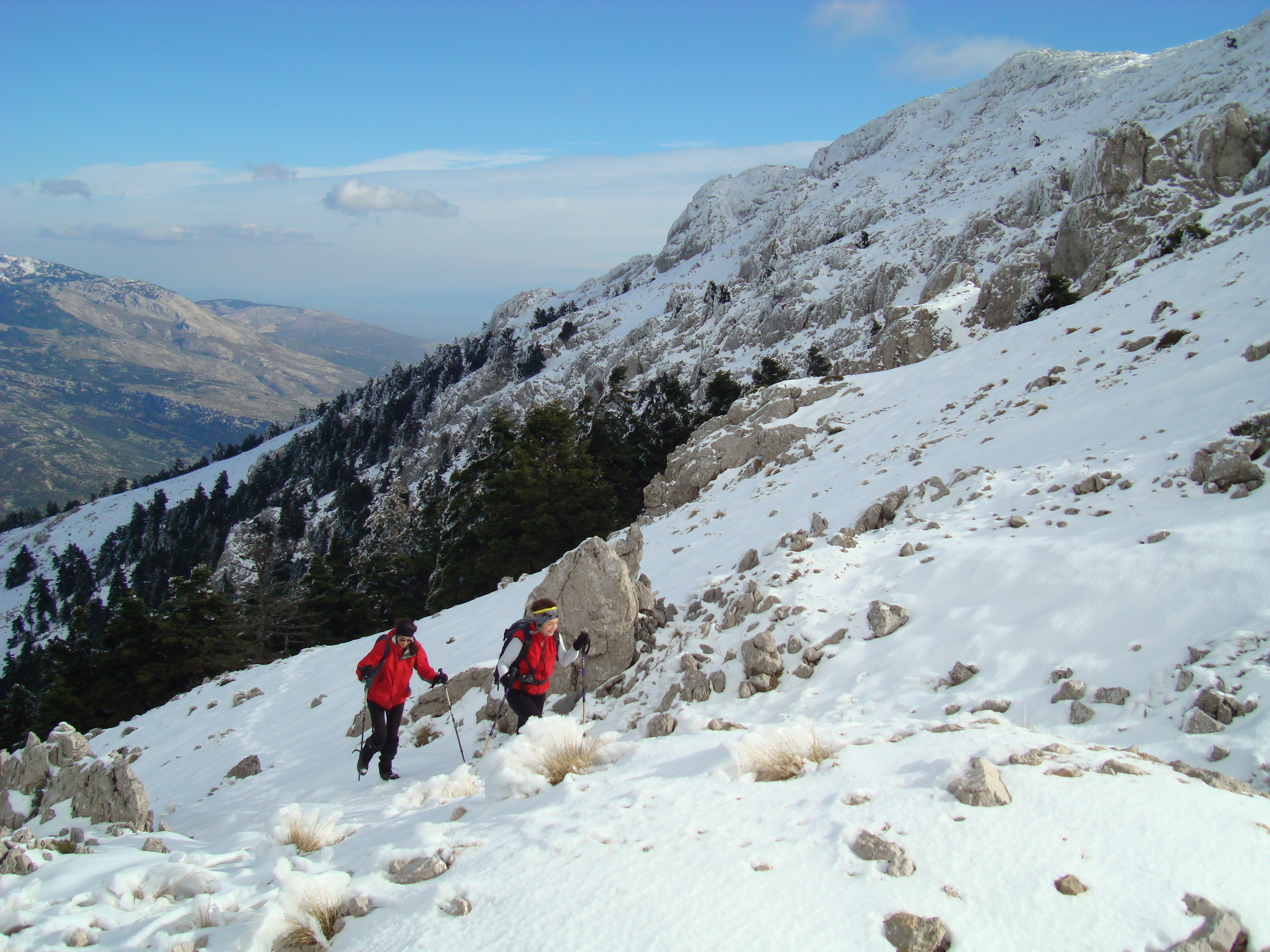
Modern Mount Helicon. Hesiod once described his nearby hometown, Ascra, as "cruel in winter, hard in summer, never pleasant."

Greeks in the late 5th and early 4th centuries BC considered their oldest poets to be Orpheus, Musaeus, Hesiod and Homer—in that order. But thereafter, Greek writers began to consider Homer earlier than Hesiod. Devotees of Orpheus and Musaeus were probably responsible for precedence being given to their two cult heroes and maybe the Homeridae were responsible in later antiquity for promoting Homer at Hesiod's expense.

The first known writers to locate Homer earlier than Hesiod were Xenophanes and Heraclides Ponticus, though Aristarchus of Samothrace was the first actually to argue the case. Ephorus made Homer a younger cousin of Hesiod, the 5th century BC historian Herodotus (Histories II, 53) evidently considered them near-contemporaries, and the 4th century BC sophist Alcidamas in his work Mouseion even brought them together for an imagined poetic ágōn (ἄγών), which survives today as the Contest of Homer and Hesiod. Most scholars today agree with Homer's priority but there are good arguments on either side.

Hesiod certainly predates the lyric and elegiac poets whose work has come down to the modern era. Imitations of his work have been observed in Alcaeus, Epimenides, Mimnermus, Semonides, Tyrtaeus and Archilochus, from which it has been inferred that the latest possible date for him is about 650 BC.

An upper limit of 750 BC is indicated by a number of considerations, such as the probability that his work was written down, the fact that he mentions a sanctuary at Delphi that was of little national significance before c. 750 BC (Theogony 499), and he lists rivers that flow into the Euxine, a region explored and developed by Greek colonists beginning in the 8th century BC. (Theogony 337–45).

Hesiod mentions a poetry contest at Chalcis in Euboea where the sons of one Amphidamas awarded him a tripod (Works and Days 654–662). Plutarch identified this Amphidamas with the hero of the Lelantine War between Chalcis and Eretria and he concluded that the passage must be an interpolation into Hesiod's original work, assuming that the Lelantine War was too late for Hesiod. Modern scholars have accepted his identification of Amphidamas but disagreed with his conclusion. The date of the war is not known precisely but estimates placing it around 730–705 BC fit the estimated chronology for Hesiod. In that case, the tripod that Hesiod won might have been awarded for his rendition of Theogony, a poem that seems to presuppose the kind of aristocratic audience he would have met at Chalcis.

== Works ==
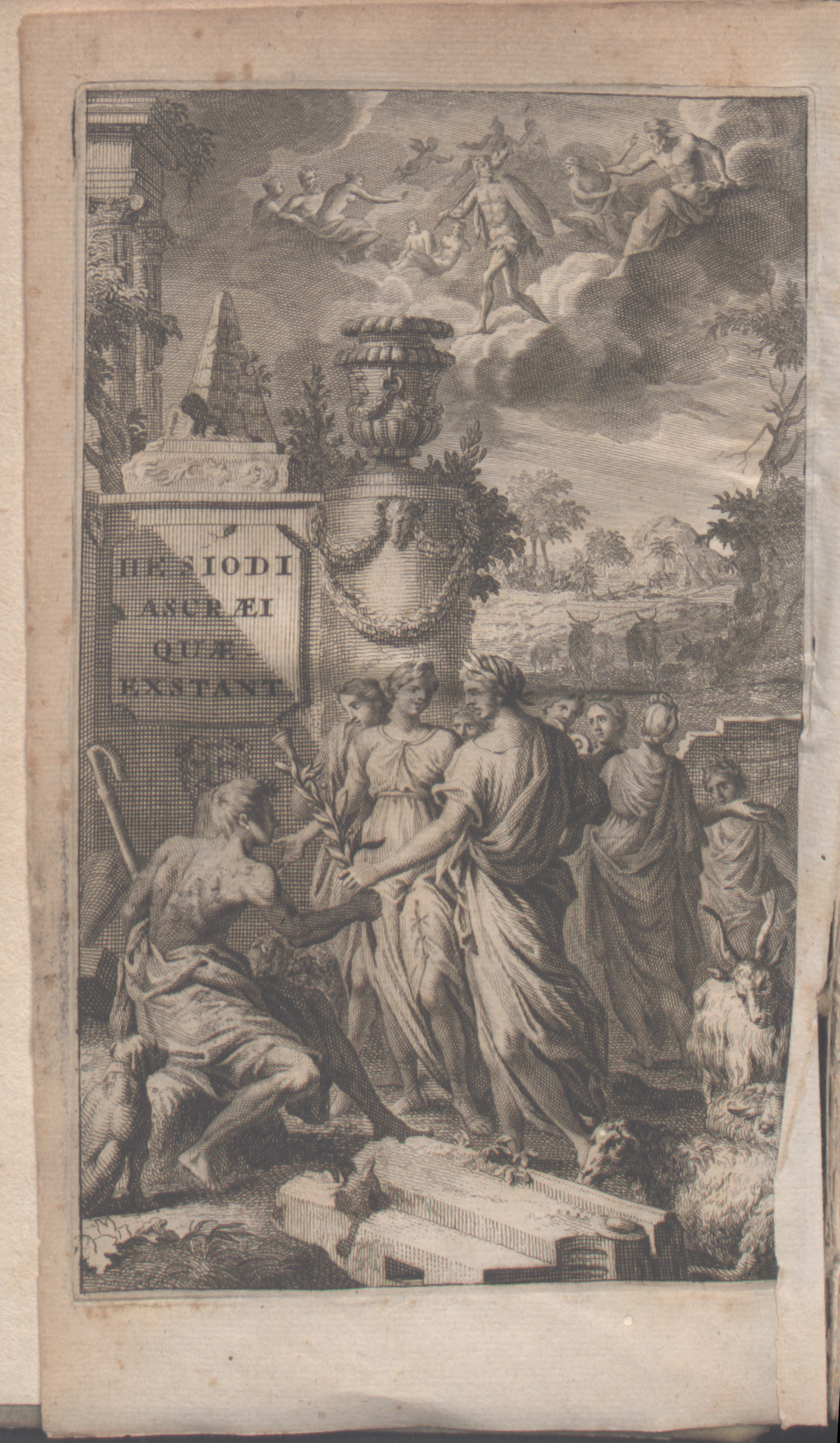
Vignette for Hesiodi Ascraei quaecumque exstant (1701)

Three works have survived which were attributed to Hesiod by ancient commentators: Works and Days, Theogony, and Shield of Heracles. Only fragments exist of other works attributed to him. The surviving works and fragments were all written in the conventional metre and language of epic. However, the Shield of Heracles is now known to be spurious and probably was written in the sixth century BC. Many ancient critics also rejected Theogony (e.g., Pausanias 9.31.3), even though Hesiod mentions himself by name in that poem. Theogony and Works and Days might be very different in subject matter, but they share a distinctive language, metre, and prosody that subtly distinguish them from Homer's work and from the Shield of Heracles (see Hesiod's Greek below). Moreover, they both refer to the same version of the Prometheus myth. Yet even these authentic poems may include interpolations. For example, the first ten verses of the Works and Days may have been borrowed from an Orphic hymn to Zeus (they were recognised as not the work of Hesiod by critics as ancient as Pausanias).

Some scholars have detected a proto-historical perspective in Hesiod, a view rejected by Paul Cartledge, for example, on the grounds that Hesiod advocates a not-forgetting without any attempt at verification. Hesiod has also been considered the father of gnomic verse. He had "a passion for systematizing and explaining things". Ancient Greek poetry in general had strong philosophical tendencies and Hesiod, like Homer, demonstrates a deep interest in a wide range of 'philosophical' issues, from the nature of divine justice to the beginnings of human society. Aristotle (Metaphysics 983b–987a) believed that the question of first causes may even have started with Hesiod (Theogony 116–53) and Homer (Iliad 14.201, 246).

He viewed the world from outside the charmed circle of aristocratic rulers, protesting against their injustices in a tone of voice that has been described as having a "grumpy quality redeemed by a gaunt dignity" but, as stated in the biography section, he could also change to suit the audience. This ambivalence appears to underlie his presentation of human history in Works and Days, where he depicts a golden period when life was easy and good, followed by a steady decline in behaviour and happiness through the silver, bronze, and Iron Ages – except that he inserts a heroic age between the last two, representing its warlike men as better than their bronze predecessors. He seems in this case to be catering to two different world-views, one epic and aristocratic, the other unsympathetic to the heroic traditions of the aristocracy.

=== Theogony ===
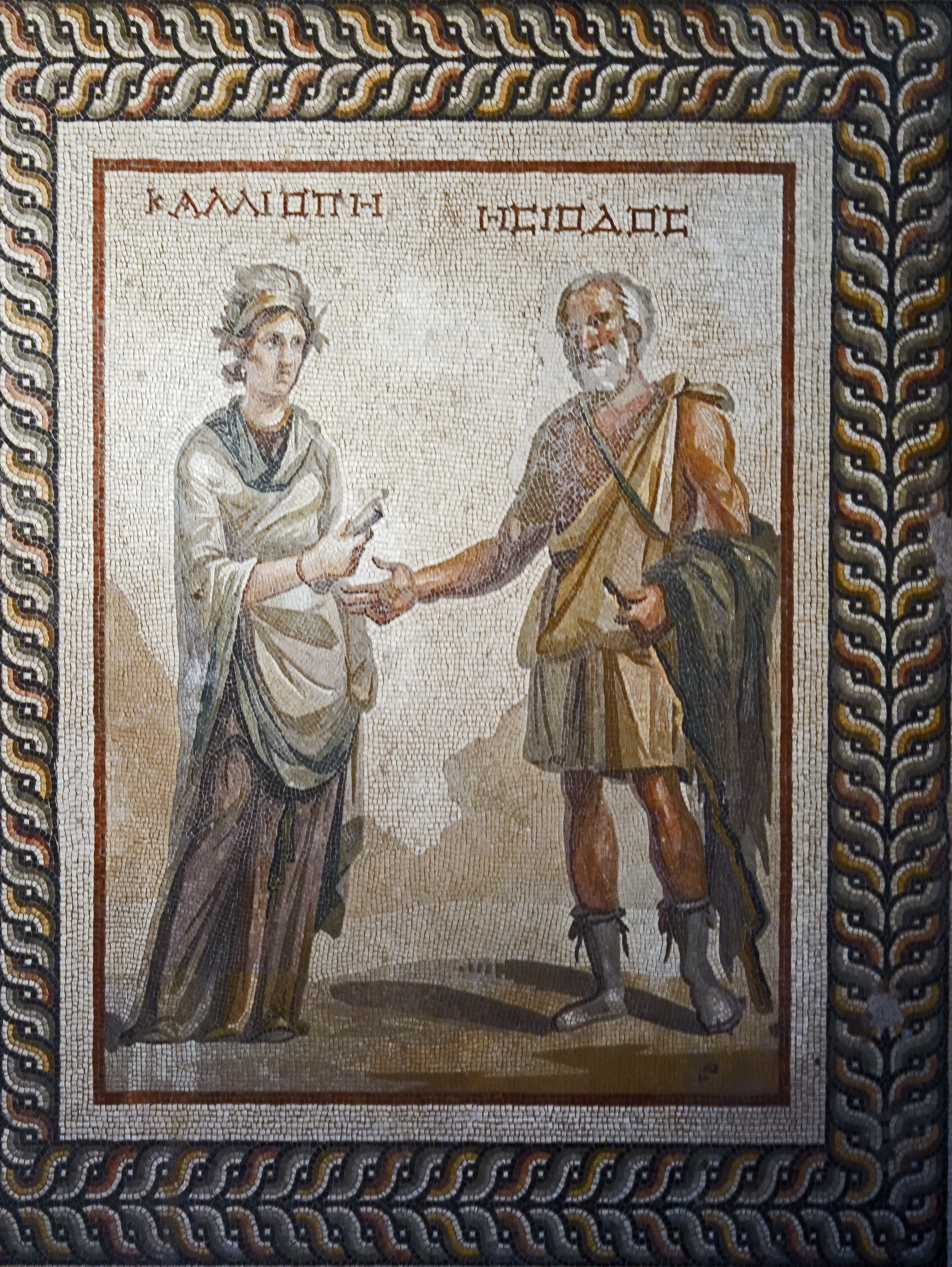
Calliope hands Hesiod a paper, 2nd-century Roman mosaic from Antioch.

The Theogony is commonly considered Hesiod's earliest work. Despite the different subject matter between this poem and the Works and Days, most scholars, with some notable exceptions, believe that the two works were written by the same man. As M. L. West writes, "Both bear the marks of a distinct personality: a surly, conservative countryman, given to reflection, no lover of women or life, who felt the gods' presence heavy about him." An example:

Hateful strife bore painful Toil,
Neglect, Starvation, and tearful Pain,
Battles, Combats...

The Theogony concerns the origins of the world (cosmogony) and of the gods (theogony), beginning with Chaos, Gaia, Tartarus and Eros, and shows a special interest in genealogy. Embedded in Greek myth, there remain fragments of quite variant tales, hinting at the rich variety of myth that once existed, city by city; but Hesiod's retelling of the old stories became, according to Herodotus, the accepted version that linked all Hellenes. It is the earliest known source for the myths of Pandora, Prometheus and the Golden Age.

The creation myth in Hesiod has long been held to have Eastern influences, such as the Hittite Song of Kumarbi and the Babylonian Enuma Elis. This cultural crossover may have occurred in the eighth- and ninth-century Greek trading colonies such as Al Mina in North Syria. (For more discussion, read Robin Lane Fox's Travelling Heroes and Peter Walcot's Hesiod and the Near East.)

=== Works and Days ===
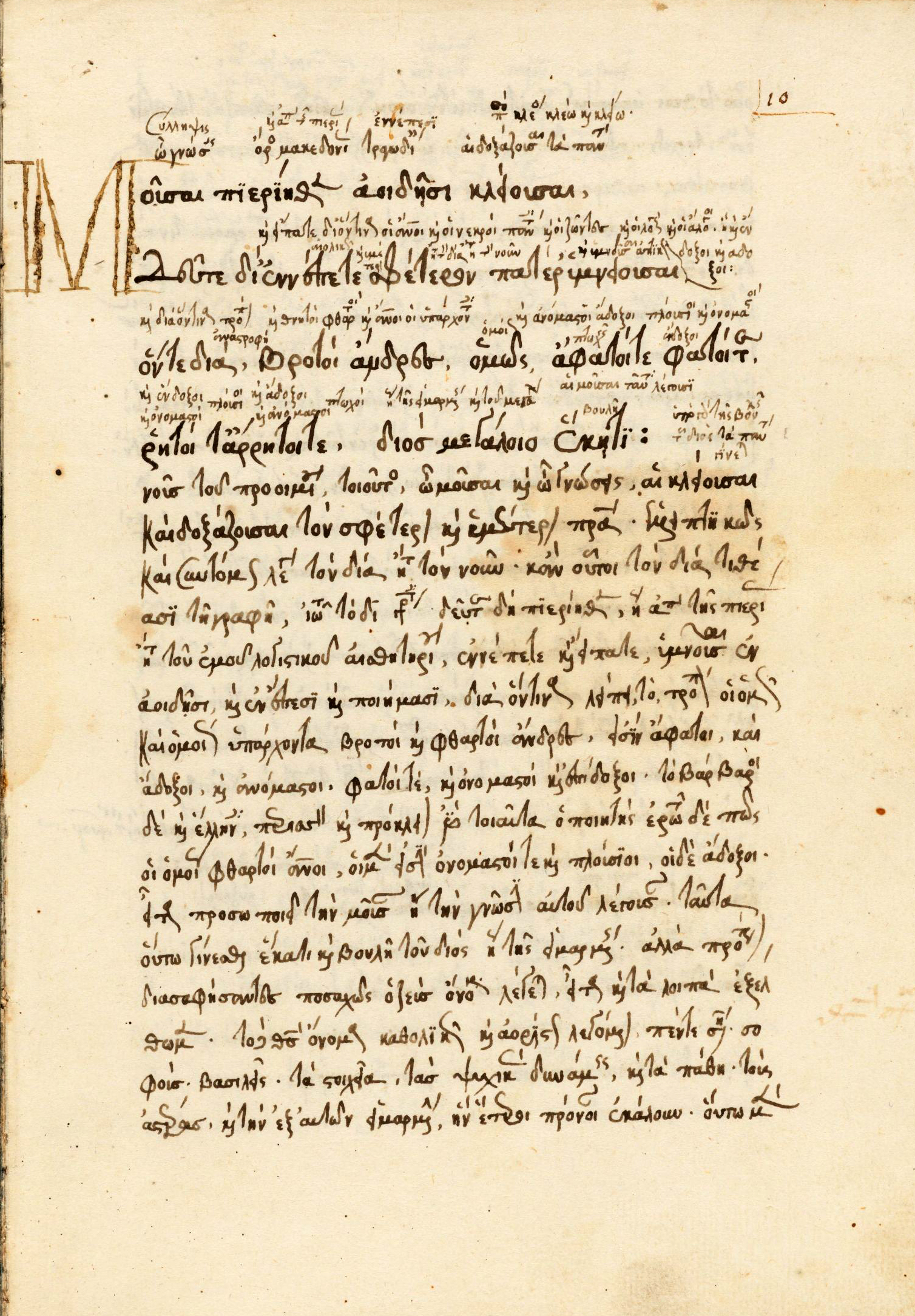
Opening lines of Works and Days in a 16th-century manuscript

Works and Days is a poem of over 800 lines which revolves around two general truths: labour is the universal lot of Man, but he who is willing to work will get by. Scholars have interpreted this work against a background of agrarian crisis in mainland Greece, which inspired a wave of documented colonisations in search of new land.

Works and Days may have been influenced by an established tradition of didactic poetry based on Sumerian, Hebrew, Babylonian and Egyptian wisdom literature.

This work lays out the five Ages of Man, as well as containing advice and wisdom, prescribing a life of honest labour and attacking idleness and unjust judges (like those who decided in favour of Perses) as well as the practice of usury. It describes immortals who roam the earth watching over justice and injustice. The poem regards labor as the source of all good, in that both gods and men hate the idle, who resemble drones in a hive. In the horror of the triumph of violence over hard work and honor, verses describing the "Golden Age" present the social character and practice of nonviolent diet through agriculture and fruit-culture as a higher path of living sufficiently.

=== Hesiodic corpus ===
In addition to the Theogony and Works and Days, numerous other poems were ascribed to Hesiod during antiquity. Modern scholarship has doubted their authenticity, and these works are generally referred to as forming part of the "Hesiodic corpus" whether or not their authorship is accepted. The situation is summed up in this formulation by Glenn Most:

"Hesiod" is the name of a person; "Hesiodic" is a designation for a kind of poetry, including but not limited to the poems of which the authorship may reasonably be assigned to Hesiod himself.

Of these works forming the extended Hesiodic corpus, only the Shield of Heracles (Ἀσπὶς Ἡρακλέους, Aspis Hērakleous) is transmitted intact via a medieval manuscript tradition.

Classical authors also attributed to Hesiod a lengthy genealogical poem known as Catalogue of Women or Ehoiai (because sections began with the Greek words ē hoiē, "Or like the one who ..."). It was a mythological catalogue of the mortal women who had mated with gods, and of the offspring and descendants of these unions.

Several additional hexameter poems were ascribed to Hesiod:

- Megalai Ehoiai, a poem similar to the Catalogue of Women, but presumably longer.
- Wedding of Ceyx, a poem concerning Heracles' attendance at the wedding of a certain Ceyx—noted for its riddles.
- Melampodia, a genealogical poem that treats of the families of, and myths associated with, the great seers of mythology.
- Idaean Dactyls, a work concerning mythological smelters, the Idaean Dactyls.
- Descent of Perithous, about Theseus and Perithous' trip to Hades.
- Precepts of Chiron, a didactic work that presented the teaching of Chiron as delivered to the young Achilles.
- Megala Erga or Great Works, a poem similar to the Works and Days, but presumably longer
- Astronomia, an astronomical poem to which Callimachus (Ep. 27) apparently compared Aratus' Phaenomena.
- Aegimius, a heroic epic concerning the Dorian Aegimius (variously attributed to Hesiod or Cercops of Miletus).
- Kiln or Potters, a brief poem asking Athena to aid potters if they pay the poet. Also attributed to Homer.
- Ornithomantia, a work on bird omens that followed the Works and Days.

In addition to these works, the Suda lists an otherwise unknown "dirge for Batrachus, [Hesiod's] beloved".

== Reception ==
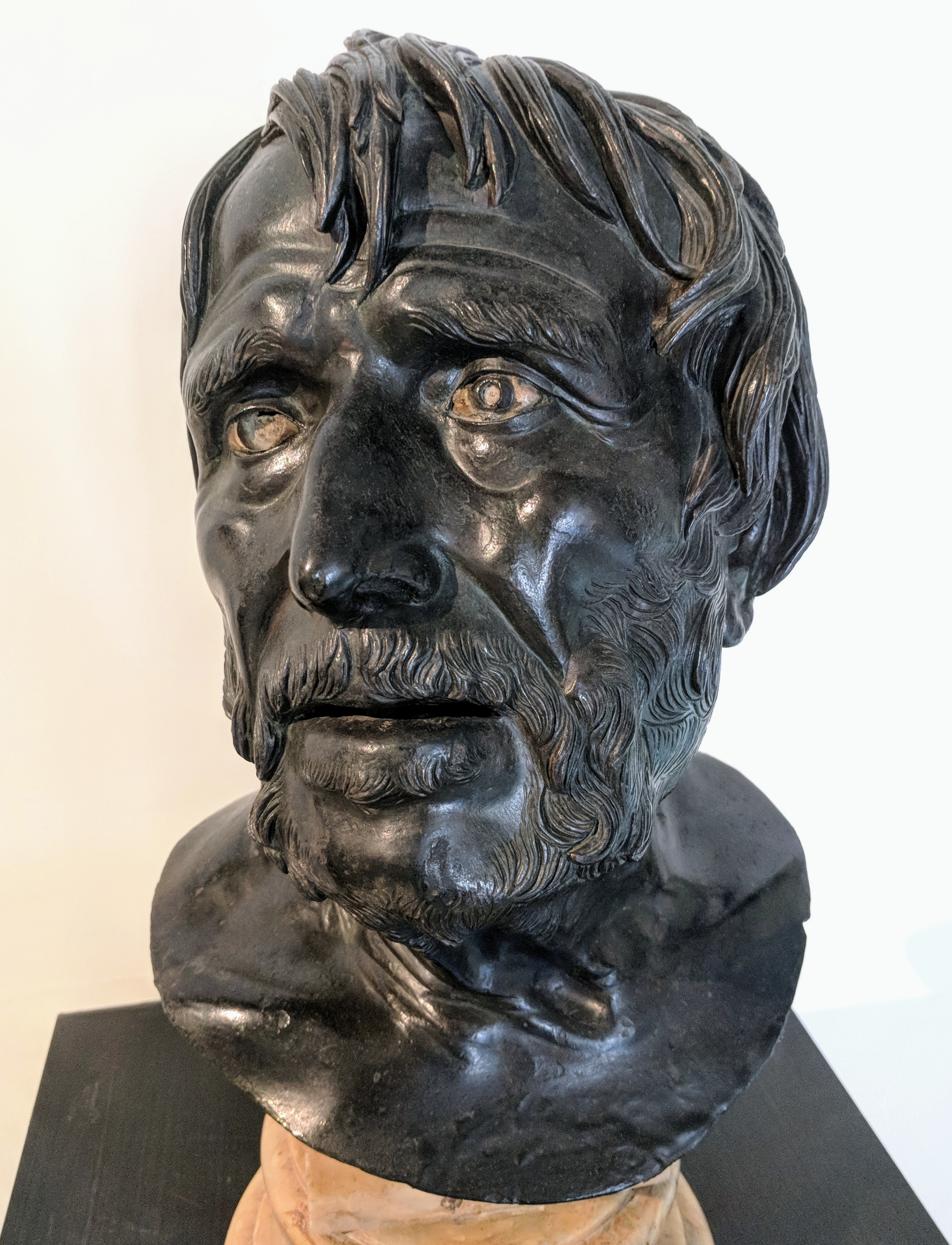
Ancient bronze bust, the so-called Pseudo-Seneca, now conjectured to be an imaginative portrait of Hesiod.

- Sappho's countryman and contemporary, the lyric poet Alcaeus, paraphrased a section of Works and Days (582–88), recasting it in lyric meter and Lesbian dialect. The paraphrase survives only as a fragment.
- The lyric poet Bacchylides quoted or paraphrased Hesiod in a victory ode addressed to Hieron of Syracuse, commemorating the tyrant's victory in the chariot race at the Pythian Games 470 BC, the attribution made with these words: "A man of Boeotia, Hesiod, minister of the [sweet] Muses, spoke thus: 'He whom the immortals honour is attended also by the good report of men.'" However, the quoted words are not found in Hesiod's extant work. (Note: The Bacchylidean quotation features in lines 191-194 of his victory ode 5. Theognis of Megara (169) is the source of a similar sentiment ("Even the fault-finder praises one whom the gods honour") but without attribution. See also fr. 344 M.-W (D. Campbell, Greek Lyric Poetry IV, Loeb 1992, p. 153))
- Hesiod's Catalogue of Women created a vogue for catalogue poems in the Hellenistic period. Thus for example Theocritus presents catalogues of heroines in two of his bucolic poems (3.40–51 and 20.34–41), where both passages are recited in character by lovelorn rustics.

== Depictions ==
=== Monnus mosaic ===
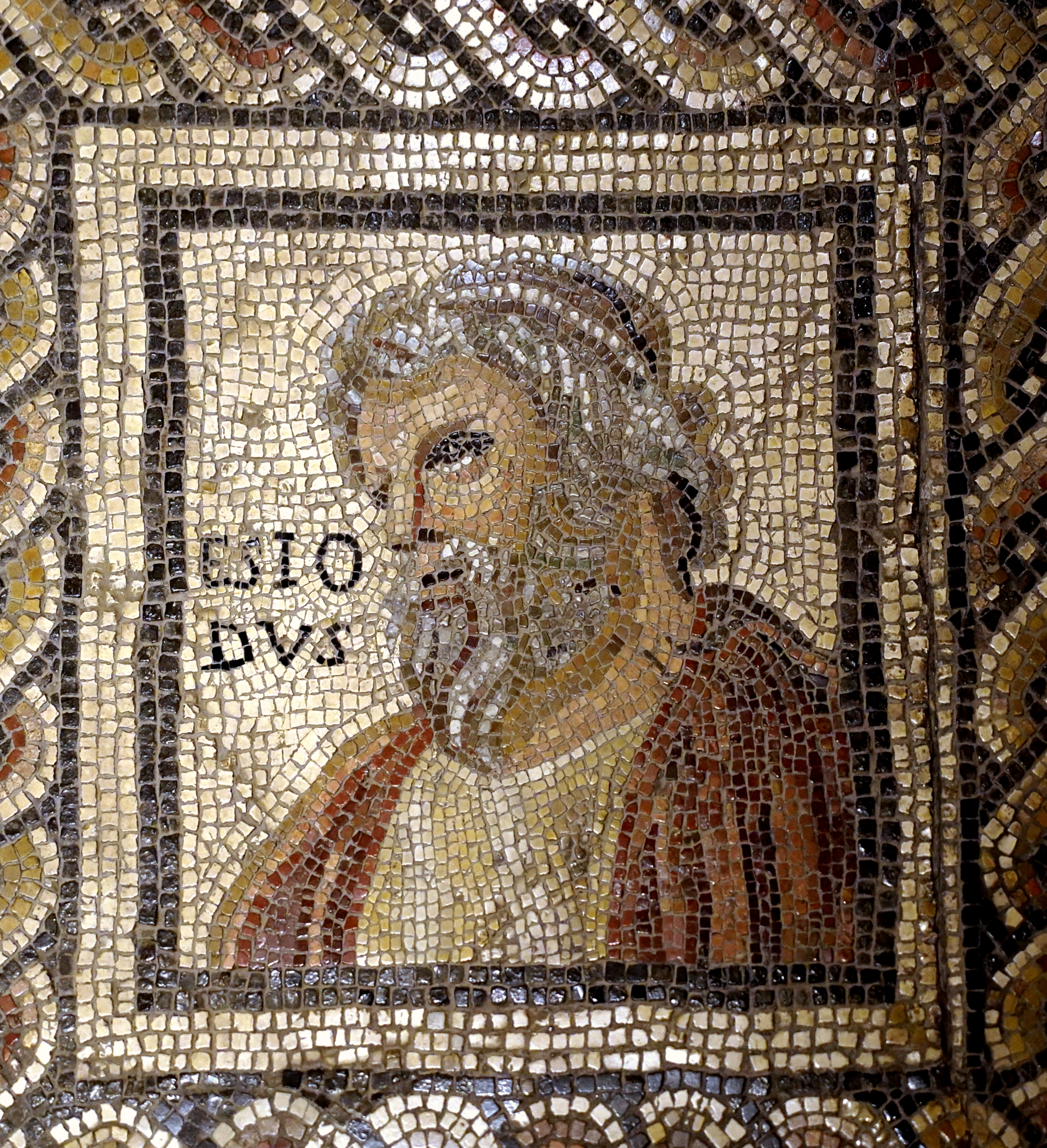
Monnus mosaic from the end of the 3rd century AD. The figure is identified by the name ESIODVS ('Hesiod').

Portrait of Hesiod from Augusta Treverorum (Trier), from the end of the 3rd century AD. The mosaic is signed in its central field by the maker, MONNUS FECIT ('Monnus made this'). The figure is identified by name: ESIODVS ('Hesiod'). It is the only known authenticated portrait of Hesiod.

=== Portrait bust ===
The Roman bronze bust, the so-called Pseudo-Seneca, of the late first century BC found at Herculaneum is now thought not to be of Seneca the Younger. It has been identified by Gisela Richter as an imagined portrait of Hesiod. In fact, it has been recognized since 1813 that the bust was not of Seneca when an inscribed herma portrait of Seneca with quite different features was discovered. Most scholars now follow Richter's identification. (Note: Gisela Richter, The Portraits of the Greeks. London: Phaidon (1965), I, p. 58 ff.; commentators agreeing with Richter include Wolfram Prinz, "The Four Philosophers by Rubens and the Pseudo-Seneca in Seventeenth-Century Painting" in The Art Bulletin 55.3 (September 1973), pp. 410–428. "[…] one feels that it may just as well have been the Greek writer Hesiod […]" and Martin Robertson, in his review of G. Richter, The Portraits of the Greeks for The Burlington Magazine 108.756 (March 1966), pp. 148–150. "[…] with Miss Richter, I accept the identification as Hesiod.")

== Hesiod's Greek ==
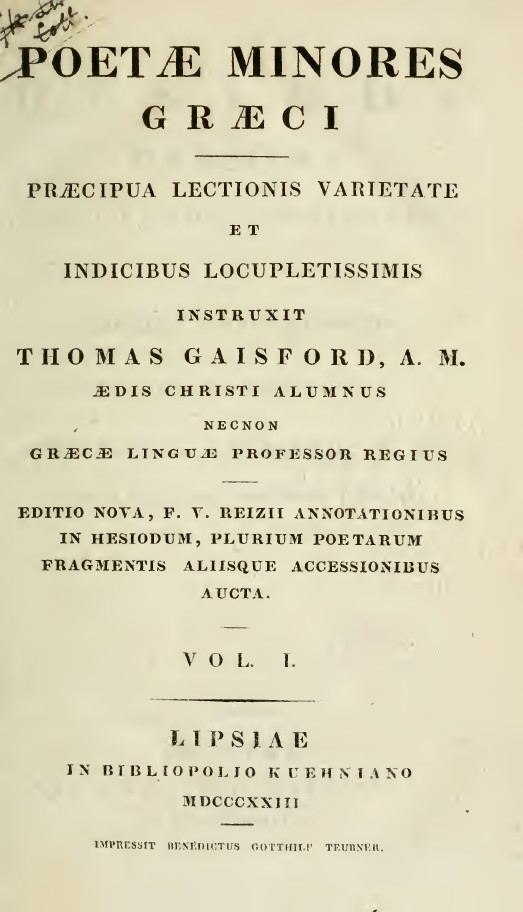
Title to an edition of Hesiod's Carmina (1823)

Hesiod employed the conventional dialect of epic verse, which was Ionian. Comparisons with Homer, a native Ionian, can be unflattering. Hesiod's handling of the dactylic hexameter was not as masterful or fluent as Homer's and one modern scholar refers to his "hobnailed hexameters". His use of language and meter in Works and Days and Theogony distinguishes him also from the author of the Shield of Heracles. All three poets, for example, employed digamma inconsistently, sometimes allowing it to affect syllable length and meter, sometimes not. The ratio of observance/neglect of digamma varies between them. The extent of variation depends on how the evidence is collected and interpreted but there is a clear trend, revealed for example in the following set of statistics.

Theogony	2.5/1
Works and Days	1.5/1
Shield	5.9/1
Homer	5.4/1 (Note: Statistics for the three 'Hesiodic' poems taken from A. V. Paues, De Digammo Hesiodeo Quaestiones (Stockholm 1897), and stats for Homer from Hartel, Sitzungs-Bericht der Wiener Akademie 78 (1874), both cited by M. L. West, Hesiod: Theogony, p. 99.)

Hesiod does not observe digamma as often as the others do. That result is a bit counter-intuitive since digamma was still a feature of the Boeotian dialect that Hesiod probably spoke, whereas it had already vanished from the Ionic vernacular of Homer. This anomaly can be explained by the fact that Hesiod made a conscious effort to compose like an Ionian epic poet at a time when digamma was not heard in Ionian speech, while Homer tried to compose like an older generation of Ionian bards, when it was heard in Ionian speech. There is also a significant difference in the results for Theogony and Works and Days, but that is merely due to the fact that the former includes a catalog of divinities and therefore it makes frequent use of the definite article associated with digamma, oἱ.

Though typical of epic, his vocabulary features some significant differences from Homer's. One scholar has counted 278 un-Homeric words in Works and Days, 151 in Theogony and 95 in Shield of Heracles. The disproportionate number of un-Homeric words in W & D is due to its un-Homeric subject matter. (Note: The count of un-Homeric words is by H.K. Fietkau, De carminum hesiodeorum atque hymnorum quattuor magnorum vocabulis non homericis (Königsberg, 1866), cited by M. L. West, Hesiod: Theogony, p. 77.) Hesiod's vocabulary also includes quite a lot of formulaic phrases that are not found in Homer, which indicates that he may have been writing within a different tradition.
