= Pseudo-Seneca (bust) =

Roman bronze bust

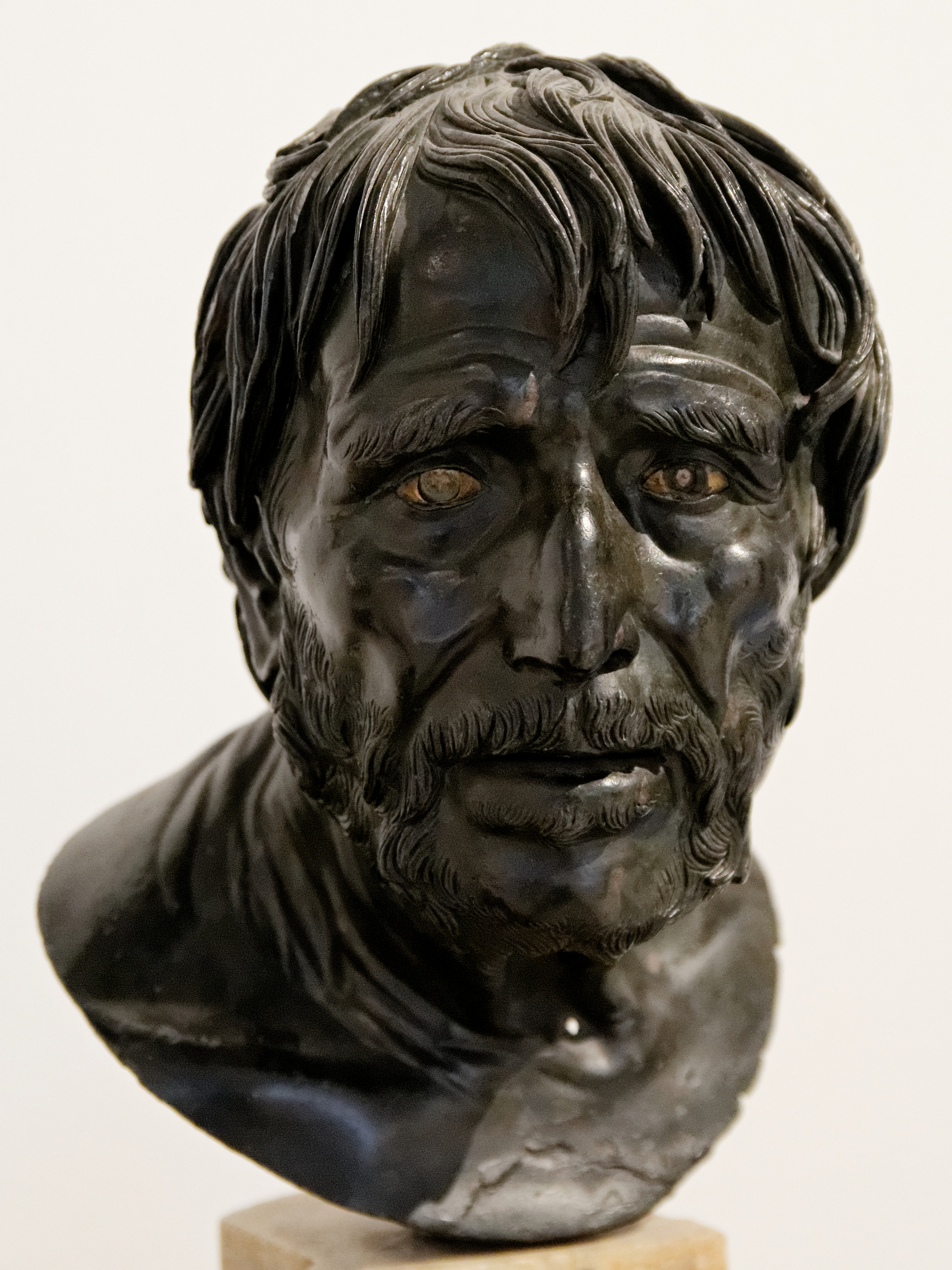
Pseudo-Seneca bust recovered from the Villa of the Papyri in Herculaneum MANN 5616

The Pseudo-Seneca is a Roman bronze bust of the late 1st century BC that was discovered in the Villa of the Papyri at Herculaneum in 1754, the finest example of about two dozen examples depicting the same face. It was originally believed to depict Seneca the Younger, the notable Roman philosopher, because its emaciated features were supposed to reflect his Stoic philosophy. However, modern scholars agree it is likely a fictitious portrait, probably intended for either Hesiod or Aristophanes. It is thought that the original example was a lost Greek bronze of c. 200 BC. The bust is conserved in the Museo Archeologico Nazionale, Naples.

== History ==
The type of this bust was first given its identification as a "genuine" contemporary portrait of Seneca by Theodor Galle, called Gallaeus, in an Antwerp republication of Fulvio Orsini's Imagines et Elogia Virorum Illustrium et Eruditor ex Antiquis Lapidibus et Nomismatib[us]... at a time when the exemplary image of the great man was more inspiring than the quality and character of the work of art that embodied it. By the 17th century, about a dozen examples of the intense and haggard "Pseudo-Seneca" had been discovered, and as many more have been discovered since.

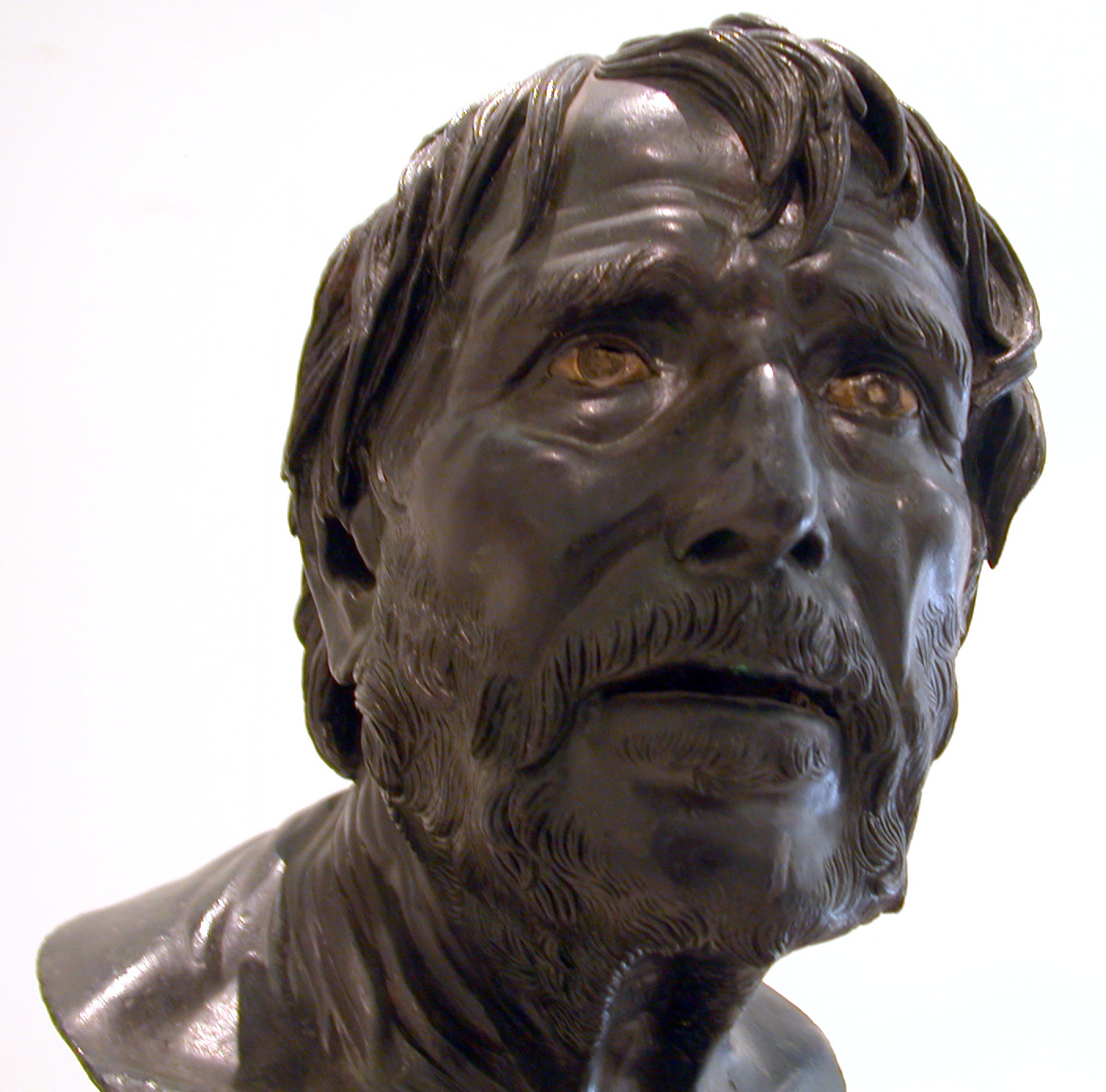
Roman bronze bust, the so-called Pseudo-Seneca, now generally identified as an imaginative portrait of either Hesiod or Aristophanes (Museo Archeologico Nazionale, Naples)

Following the example of Cicero, who had decorated his study with busts, or of the imagines illustrium that peopled the villa at Sorrento of Pollius Felix, described by Statius, gentlemen and scholars of the 16th and 17th centuries were avid for examples of the great writers of Classical Antiquity constantly before their eyes: "the learned all over Europe looked with awe and devotion at the Stoic philosopher, emaciated, even uncouth, disdainful of the luxury and corruption of Nero's court, and soon to commit suicide". An early 17th-century version of the head now among the Arundel marbles at the Ashmolean Museum was probably owned by the court painter Peter Paul Rubens.

Of the Herculanean version of the Pseudo-Seneca, as it is still widely known, the outstanding quality was quickly recognized by Winckelmann, though he already began to doubt that the bust was that of Seneca as early as 1764. An engraving of it was published in the magnificently-produced series of folios that appeared under the royal patronage of Ferdinand I of the Two Sicilies, Le Antichità di Ercolano (vol. V, 1767).

In 1813 a Roman image of Seneca was found on an inscribed marble herm portrait, which showed a man with quite different features. Since then, the bust has been conjectured to represent many other people, including Aesop, Archilochus, Aristophanes, Callimachus, Carneades, Epicharmus, Eratosthenes, Euripides, Hesiod, Hipponax, Lucretius, Philemon, and Philitas of Cos. Gisela Richter suggested that Hesiod seemed to be the most acceptable, a suggestion that other commentators have endorsed.

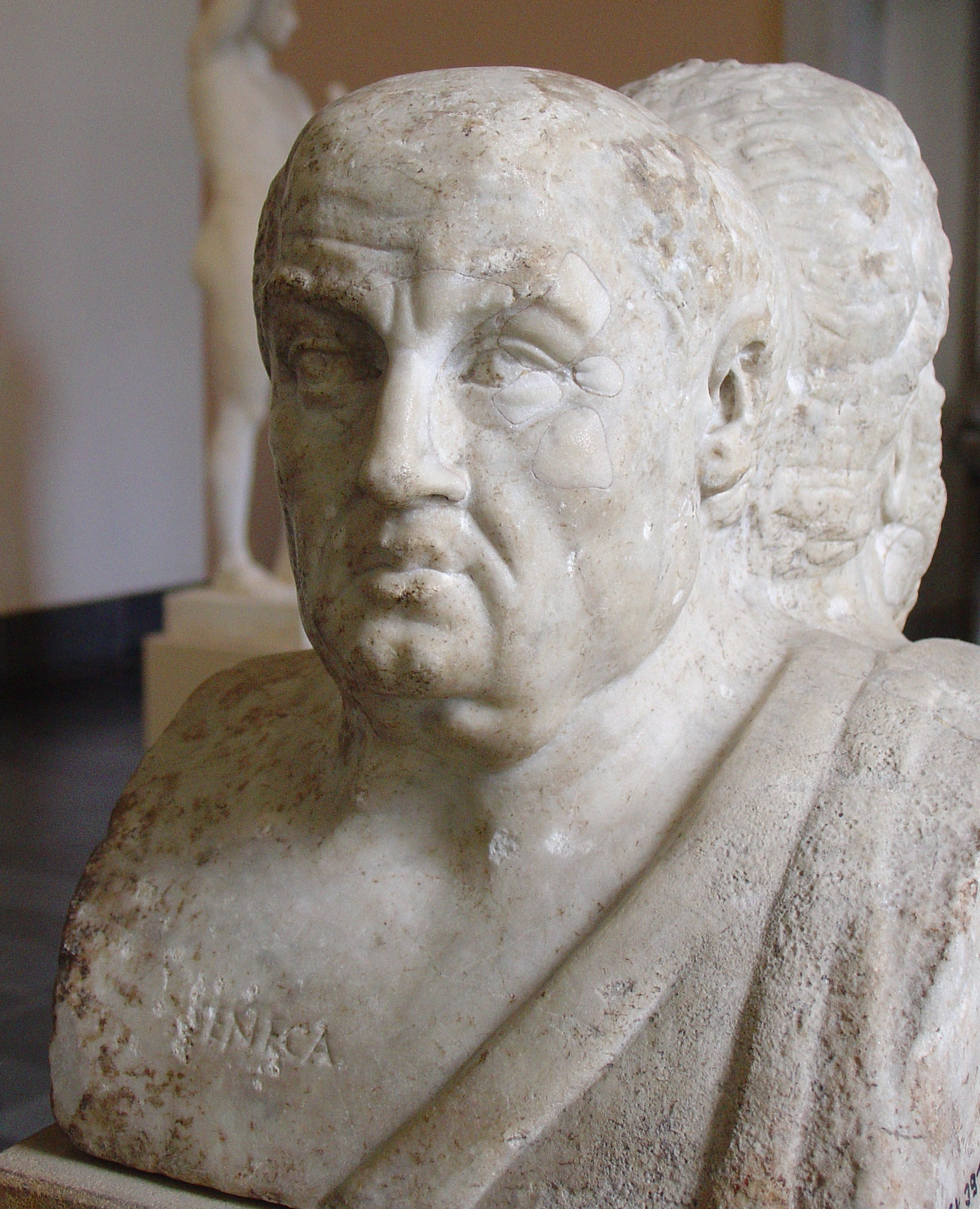
Bust of Seneca, part of the double herm discovered in 1813 (Antikensammlung Berlin)

Erika Simon believed that it represented Hesiod and that the lost original was created in the circle of Krates of Mallos and the frieze-sculptors of the Pergamon Altar. The online presentation of the Museo Archeologico Nazionale, Naples describes the state of discussion in the following way:

Nowadays the prevailing interpretation is that the head is a portrait of a dramatist due to the presence, on a copy now at the Museo delle Terme at Rome, of an ivy wreath, the prize for theatrical contexts: some scholars specifically identify him as Aristophanes, because the type in question is associated, in a double herm of Villa Albani, with the portrait of Menander; according to other experts, it could be a portrait of Aesop, Hesiod, Callimachus or Apollonius of Rhodes. We can therefore be quite certain that the person depicted must have been extremely famous, as is proven by the large number of copies to survive, which number a total of forty. From the qualitative point of view, the head displays excellent workmanship; rather than a copy, it might well even be the original from which all the others are reproduced, and should be regarded as a portrait of reconstruction in which the accentuated wrinkles and folds of the face and forehead of the man, the intentionally unruly locks and the wrinkly neck contrast openly with the unwavering, penetrating gaze. The original should be ascribed to the trend of realistic virtuosity, dateable to between the third and second century BC.
