= Idaean Dactyls (poem) =

The "Idaean Dactyls" (Ancient Greek: Ἰδαῖοι Δάκτυλοι, Idaioi Daktyloi) is a lost poem that was attributed to Hesiod by the tenth-century encyclopedia known as the Suda. The ascription is doubtful, but two quotations of "Hesiod" in other ancient authors do concern the discovery of metals and have been tentatively assigned to this poem by modern editors. Details of this sort were presumably a focus of the poem, for the Idaean Dactyls of the title were mythological smelters who were credited with the invention of metallurgy, as is attested in this quotation from Clement of Alexandria:

Kelmis and Damnameneus, the Idaean Dactyls, were the first to discover iron in Cyprus; Delas, another Idaean, discovered the mixing of bronze, but according to Hesiod it was Scythes.

Κέλμις τε αὖ καὶ Δαμναμενεὺς οἱ τῶν Ἰδαίων δάκτυλοι πρῶτοι σίδηρον εὗρον ἐν Κύπρῳ; Δέλας δὲ ἄλλος Ἰδαῖος εὗρε χαλκοῦ κρᾶσιν, ὡς δὲ Ἡσίοδος, Σκύθης.

== Select editions and translations ==
=== Critical editions ===
- Rzach, A. (1908), Hesiodi Carmina (2nd rev. ed.), Leipzig: B.G. Teubneri.
- Merkelbach, R.; West, M.L. (1967), Fragmenta Hesiodea, Oxford: Oxford University Press, ISBN 978-0-19-814171-6.
- Merkelbach, R.; West, M.L. (1990), "Fragmenta selecta", in F. Solmsen (ed.), Hesiodi Theogonia, Opera et Dies, Scutum (3rd rev. ed.), Oxford: Oxford University Press, ISBN 978-0-19-814071-9.

=== Translations ===
- Arrighetti, G., ed. (1998), Esiodo. Opere, Torino: Einaudi-Gallimard, ISBN 978-88-446-0053-2.
- Most, G.W. (2006), Hesiod: Theogony, Works and Days, Testimonia, Loeb Classical Library no. 57, Cambridge, MA: Harvard University Press, ISBN 978-0-674-99622-9.
- Most, G.W. (2007), Hesiod: The Shield, Catalogue, Other Fragments, Loeb Classical Library no. 503, Cambridge, MA, ISBN 978-0-674-99622-9.

== Bibliography ==
- Cingano, E. (2009), "The Hesiodic Corpus", in Montanari, F.; Rengakos, A.; Tsagalis, C. (eds.), Brill's Companion to Hesiod, Leiden: Brill, pp. 91–130, ISBN 978-9004-17840-3.
- Schwartz, J. (1960), Pseudo-Hesiodeia: recherches sur la composition, la diffusion et la disparition ancienne d'oeuvres attribuées à Hésiode, Leiden: Brill.
- West, M.L. (1978), Hesiod: Works & Days, Oxford: Clarendon Press, ISBN 978-0-19-814005-4.
