= Indian mythology =

Indian mythology may refer to:

- Hindu mythology (main Indian mythology)
  - Vedic mythology
- Meitei mythology (or Manipuri mythology)
- Tamil mythology
- Jain mythology
- Buddhist mythology
- Sikh mythology
- Mythologies of the Indigenous peoples of the Americas

== See also ==
- Folklore of India
- Indian religions
- Native American religions
