= Megalai Ehoiai =

Fragmentary Greek epic poem

The Megalai Ehoiai (Ancient Greek: Μεγάλαι Ἠοῖαι, Ancient: [meɡálai ɛːhói.ai]), or Great Ehoiai, is a fragmentary Greek epic poem that was popularly, though not universally, attributed to Hesiod during antiquity. Like the more widely read Hesiodic Catalogue of Women, the Megalai Ehoiai was a genealogical poem structured around the exposition of heroic family trees among which myths concerning many of their members were narrated. At least seventeen fragments of the poem are transmitted by quotations in other ancient authors and two second-century CE papyri, but given the similarities between the Megalai Ehoiai and Catalogue of Women it is possible that some fragments attributed to the Catalogue actually derive from the less popular Hesiodic work. Indeed, most of the scholarly attention devoted to the poem has been concerned with its relation to the Catalogue and whether or not the title "Megalai Ehoiai" in fact referred to a single, independent epic.

== Select editions and translations ==
=== Critical editions ===
- Rzach, A. (1908), Hesiodi Carmina (2nd rev. ed.), Leipzig.
- Merkelbach, R.; West, M.L. (1967), Fragmenta Hesiodea, Oxford, ISBN 0-19-814171-8.
- Merkelbach, R.; West, M.L. (1990), "Fragmenta selecta", in F. Solmsen (ed.), Hesiodi Theogonia, Opera et Dies, Scutum (3rd rev. ed.), Oxford, ISBN 0-19-814071-1.
- Hirschberger, M. (2004), Gynaikōn Katalogos und Megalai Ēhoiai: Ein Kommentar zu den Fragmenten zweier hesiodeischer Epen, Munich & Leipzig, ISBN 3-598-77810-4.

=== Translations ===
- Evelyn-White, H.G. (1936), Hesiod, the Homeric Hymns, and Homerica, Loeb Classical Library, vol. 57 (3rd rev. ed.), Cambridge, Massachusetts, ISBN 978-0-674-99063-0. (The link is to the 1st edition of 1914.) English translation with facing Greek text of all the fragments in Merkelbach & West (1967) except for frr. 251(a) and 259(a).
- Most, G.W. (2006), Hesiod: Theogony, Works and Days, Testimonia, Loeb Classical Library, vol. 57, Cambridge, Massachusetts, ISBN 978-0-674-99622-9.
- Most, G.W. (2007), Hesiod: The Shield, Catalogue, Other Fragments, Loeb Classical Library, vol. 503, Cambridge, Massachusetts, ISBN 978-0-674-99623-6.

== Bibliography ==
- Cingano, E. (2009), "The Hesiodic Corpus", in Montanari; Rengakos; Tsagalis (eds.), Brill's Companion to Hesiod, pp. 91–130.
- Cohen, I.M. (1986), "The Hesiodic Catalogue of Women and Megalai Ehoiai", Phoenix, 40 (2): 127–42, doi:10.2307/1088507, JSTOR 1088507.
- D'Alessio, G.B. (2005a), "The Megalai Ehoiai: A Survey of the Fragments", in Hunter (ed.), The Hesidioc Catalogue of Women: Constructions and Reconstructions, pp. 176–216.
- D'Alessio, G.B. (2005b), "Ordered from the Catalogue: Pindar, Bacchylides and Hesiodic Genealogical Poetry", in Hunter (ed.), The Hesidioc Catalogue of Women: Constructions and Reconstructions, pp. 217–38.
- D'Alessio, G.B. (2005c), "Martina Hirschberger, Gynaikôn Katalogos und Megalai Ehoiai. Ein Kommentar zu den Fragmenten zweier hesiodeischer Epen. BzA 198. München/Leipzig: K.G. Saur, 2004. Pp. 511. ISBN 3-598-77810-4. €110.00.", Review, Bryn Mawr Classical Review, 2005.02.31.
- Hunter, R. (2005), The Hesiodic Catalogue of Women: Constructions and Reconstructions, Cambridge, ISBN 0-521-83684-0.
- Leo, F. (1894), "Hesiodea", Ausgewählte kleine Schriften, vol. ii, Rome, pp. 343–63.
- Montanari, F.; Rengakos, A.; Tsagalis, C. (2009), Brill's Companion to Hesiod, Leiden, ISBN 978-90-04-17840-3.
- Schwartz, J. (1960), Pseudo-Hesiodeia: recherches sur la composition, la diffusion et la disparition ancienne d'oeuvres attribuées à Hésiode, Leiden.
- West, M.L. (1985), The Hesiodic Catalogue of Women: Its Nature, Structure, and Origins, Oxford, ISBN 0-19-814034-7.
