= Johann Friedrich Dübner =

German-born French classical scholar (1802–1867)

Johann Friedrich Dübner (20 December 1802 – 13 December 1867) was a German classical scholar (naturalized a Frenchman).

== Biography ==
He was born in Hörselgau, near Gotha. After studying at the University of Göttingen he returned to Gotha, where from 1827 to 1832 he held a post (inspector coenobii) in connection with the gymnasium. During this period he made his name known by editions of Justin and Persius (after Casaubon).

In 1832 he was invited by the brothers Didot to Paris, to cooperate in a new edition of Estienne's Greek Thesaurus. He also contributed largely to the Bibliotheca Graeca published by the same firm, a series of Greek classics with Latin translation, critical notes and valuable indexes. One of Dübner's most important works was an edition of Julius Caesar undertaken by command of Napoleon III, which obtained him the cross of the Legion of Honour.

His editions are considered to be models of literary and philological criticism, and did much to raise the standard of classical scholarship in France. He violently attacked Burnouf's method of teaching Greek, but without result. Dübner may have gone too far in his zeal for reform, and his opinions may have been too harshly expressed.

Dübner died in Montreuil, near Paris.
