= Glenn W. Most =

American classical philologist (born 1952)

Glenn Warren Most (born June 12, 1952 in Miami) is an American classicist and comparatist originating from the US, but also working in Germany and Italy.

== Career ==
Most studied classics at Harvard University from 1968 onwards and received a B.A. Summa Cum Laude in Classics (Latin) in 1972. He then took a Masters course at Corpus Christi College at Oxford University until 1973, when he continued at the Department of Comparative Literature of Yale University, receiving a M. Phil. in 1978. Two years later, he received a Ph.D. under Paul de Man with a thesis called "The Bait of Falsehood: Studies in the Rhetorical Strategy of Poetic Truth in the Romantic Period". Simultaneously, from 1976 to 1978, he studied classics at the Philologisches Seminar of University of Tübingen and was awarded D.Phil. under Richard Kannicht with a thesis entitled "Pindar's Truth: Unity and Occasionality in the Epinician Ode".

In 1980, Most was appointed Andrew W. Mellon Assistant Professor of Classics at Princeton University and remained in this position until 1985. In 1982/83, he was at the American Academy in Rome. In 1985/86, he taught at the Università degli Studi di Siena, from then until 1987 as visiting professor at the University of Michigan. In 1987, he followed a call from the Universität Innsbruck, becoming Ordentlicher Universitätsprofessor für Klassische Philologie und Altertumskunde. In 1988/89, he was a fellow at the Wissenschaftskolleg zu Berlin. In 1991, Most moved to a full professorship for Ancient Greek language and literature at the Ruprecht-Karls-Universität Heidelberg, where he taught until 2001. During these years, Most also was guest professor at the University of Michigan and professor at the Committee on Social Thought at the University of Chicago. In 1994, Most was the first classicist to receive the Leibniz-Preis of the Deutsche Forschungsgemeinschaft. Since 2001, he is teaching as Professor of Ancient Greek at the Scuola Normale at Pisa.

== Works ==
Most's work ranges from Greek to Latin authors, from literature to philosophy, and from history and methodology of classical studies to modern literary theory and reception history. In particular, he has studied the relationship of the modern towards the ancient world, including New Testament topics such as the story of Doubting Thomas. Working with the French historian André Laks, Most published original texts and translations of some Pre-Socratic works using an identifying system similar to that adopted by Diels and Kranz.

Selected works include

- The measures of praise. Structure and function in Pindar's Second Pythian and Seventh Nemean odes, Vandenhoeck und Ruprecht, Göttingen 1985 (Hypomnemata, H. 83) ISBN 3-525-25182-3
- Collecting fragments = Fragmente sammeln (Ed.), Vandenhoeck und Ruprecht, Göttingen 1997 (Aporemata, Bd. 1) ISBN 3-525-25900-X
- Editing texts = Texte edieren (Ed.), Vandenhoeck und Ruprecht, Göttingen 1998 (Aporemata, Bd. 2) ISBN 3-525-25901-8
- Commentaries = Kommentare (Ed.), Vandenhoeck und Ruprecht, Göttingen 1999 (Aporemata, Bd. 4) ISBN 3-525-25903-4
- Historicization = Historisierung (Ed.), Vandenhoeck und Ruprecht, Göttingen 2001 (Aporemata, Bd. 5) ISBN 3-525-25904-2
- Disciplining classics = Altertumswissenschaft als Beruf (Ed.), Vandenhoeck und Ruprecht, Göttingen 2001 (Aporemata, Bd. 6) ISBN 3-525-25905-0
- Ancient anger: Perspectives from Homer to Galen. Ed. by Susanna Braund and Glenn W. Most. Cambridge: Cambridge University Press, 2003.
- Doubting Thomas. Cambridge, Mass., London: Harvard University Press, 2005.
- Laks, André; Most, Glenn W., eds. (2016). Early Greek Philosophy. Loeb Classical Library 524-532. Vol. I–IX. Harvard University Press.
- André Laks and Glenn W. Most, Les débuts de la philosophie. Des premiers penseurs grecs à Socrate, Paris, Fayard, 2016 ISBN 978-2-213-63753-2
