= Semonides of Amorgos =

Greek iambic and elegiac poet (7th century BC)

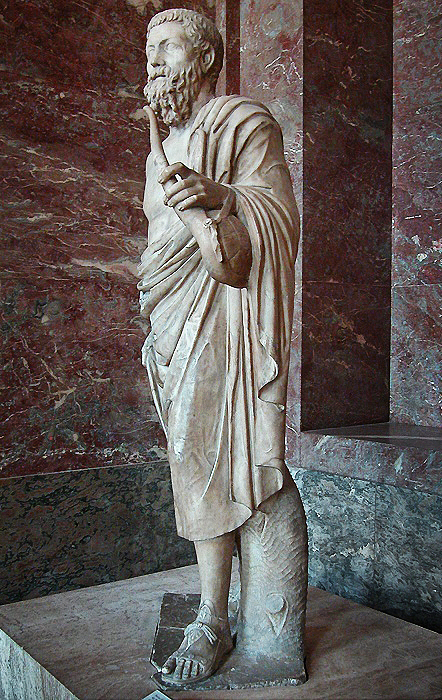

Semonides of Amorgos (/sɪˈmɒnɪˌdiːz/; Ancient Greek: Σημωνίδης ὁ Ἀμοργῖνος, variantly Σιμωνίδης; fl. 7th century BC) was a Greek iambic and elegiac poet who is believed to have lived during the seventh century BC. Fragments of his poetry survive as quotations in other ancient authors, the most extensive and well known of which is a satiric account of different types of women which is often cited in discussions of misogyny in Archaic Greece. The poem takes the form of a catalogue, with each type of woman represented by an animal whose characteristics—in the poet's scheme—are also characteristic of a large body of the female population.

Other fragments belong to the registers of gnomic poetry and wisdom literature in which the Hesiodic Works and Days and the Theognidea are classed, and reflect a similarly pessimistic view of the human experience. There is also evidence that Semonides composed the sort of personal invective found in the work of his near contemporary iambographer Archilochus and the later Hipponax, but no surviving fragment can be securely attributed to such a poem.

== Name and biography ==
The name "Semonides" (Σημωνίδης, Sēmōnídes) is attested by an entry transmitted in two ancient lexica—the Etymologicum Genuinum and Etymologicum Magnum—which apparently had Choeroboscus as its immediate source:

Σιμωνίδης. ἐπὶ μὲν τοῦ ἰαμβοποιοῦ διὰ τοῦ η γράφεται, καὶ ἴσως παρὰ τὸ σῆμα ἐστί· τὸ δὲ ἐπὶ τοῦ λυρικοῦ, διὰ τοῦ ι, καὶ ἴσως παρὰ τὸ σιμὸς ἐστί. Χοιροβοσκός.

Simonides: in the case of the iambic poet is written with an eta, as in "sign" (sēma); the name of the lyric poet is written with an iota, as in "snub-nosed" (sīmos). — Choeroboscus

The lyric poet mentioned herein is Simonides of Ceos (6th–5th centuries BC). Despite the testimony of the etymologica, every source that quotes the iambic poet spells his name identically with that of his more famous namesake, and the only other author who uses the form "Semonides" is Philodemus. Whatever the poet's name actually was, modern scholarship has adopted Choeroboscus' distinction between the two forms as a means of distinguishing the two poets. Still, the homophony of their names in ancient quotations leaves open the possibility that some fragments attributed to Simonides might actually belong to Semonides.

Two notices in the tenth-century encyclopedia known as the Suda provide most of the extant details of Semonides's life. His primary lemma reads: "Simonides [sic], son of Crines, of Amorgos, iambic writer. He wrote elegiac poetry in two books and iambics. He was born (or 'flourished': γέγονε) 490 years after the Trojan War [i.e. 693 BC]. He was the first to write iambics according to some." Further information has been conflated with the entry on Simmias of Rhodes; the relevant portion is:

He was originally a Samian, but in the colonisation of Amorgos he was sent as leader by the Samians. He founded Amorgos in three cities, Minoa, Aegialus and Arcesime. He was born (or "flourished") 406 years after the Trojan War [i.e. 777 BC]. According to some he was the first writer of iambics, and wrote various other things including an Early History of Samos.

Other contradictory dates for Semonides's birth or floruit are found in the chronographic tradition relying upon Eusebius' Chronicon (Olympiad 29.1 = 664 BC), Cyril of Alexandria (29th Olympiad = 664–661), and Clement of Alexandria (20th Olympiad = 700–697). Semonides's role in the colonisation of Amorgos and his identification as a contemporary of Archilochus in the ancient testimonia recommend accepting the later dates of Eusebius and Cyril, and today he is almost universally considered to have lived in the middle and latter half of the seventh century.

Based upon a perceived allusion to Archilochus at Semonides fr. 7.51–2 some have refined the chronology further, arguing that Semonides either lived after Archilochus or was his younger contemporary. If the Suda's testimony that Semonides participated in the colonization of Amorgos is true, he likely had a political career similar to that of Archilochus, who was among the colonists of Thasos.

== Poetry ==
Although the Suda states that Semonides composed elegy as well iambus, none of his elegiac poetry has survived. If the encyclopedia's information is to be trusted, it is probable that the first entry's "elegiac poetry in two books" refers to the Early History of Samos in the second. This work would belong to the genre of ktisis ("foundation") poetry which Mimnermus' elegiac Smyrneis might also have represented.

Semonides's poetry, as is the case with archaic elegy and iambus in general, is composed in a literary Ionic dialect largely reminiscent of Homeric Greek and occasionally includes echoes of Homeric and Hesiodic poetry. The extant fragments are written in iambic trimeters, a stichic verse form also employed by Archilochus which would later be the primary meter of dialogue in tragedy. To judge from the admittedly small sample of his work, Semonides was a conservative metrician: in 180 lines there is not a single certain instance of resolution.

== Editions, translations and commentaries ==
- Campbell, D.A. (1982), Greek Lyric Poetry (2nd ed.), London, ISBN 0-86292-008-6. — Text and commentary on select fragments.
- Diehl, E. (1949–52), Anthologia lyrica Graeca (3rd ed.), Leipzig. — Critical edition of the Greek.
- Gerber, D.E. (1999), Greek Iambic Poetry, Loeb Classical Library (2nd ed.), Cambridge, MA, ISBN 978-0674995819. — Translation with facing Greek text,
- Lloyd-Jones, H. (1975), Females of the Species: Semonides on Women, London. — Translation with Greek text and commentary.
- Verdenius, W.J. (1969a), "Semonides über die Frauen. Ein Kommentar zu Fr. 7", Mnemosyne, 21 (2/3): 132–58, doi:10.1163/156852568X00806, JSTOR 4429627. — Commentary keyed to the text of Diehl.
  - Verdenius, W.J. (1969b), "Semonides über die Frauen. Nachtrag zum Kommentar zu Fr. 7", Mnemosyne, 21 (3): 299–301, doi:10.1163/156852569X00805, JSTOR 4429755.
  - Verdenius, W.J. (1977), "Epilegomena zu Semonides Fr. 7", Mnemosyne, 30 (1): 1–12, doi:10.1163/156852577X00211, JSTOR 4430651.
- West, M.L. (1992), Iambi et Elegi Graeci ante Alexandrum cantati, vol. ii (2nd ed.), Oxford, ISBN 0-19-814096-7. — Critical edition of the Greek.

== Sources ==
- Asmis, E. (1995), "Philodemus on Censorship, Moral Utility, and Formalism in Poetry", in Dirk Obbink (ed.), Philodemus and Poetry: Poetic Theory and Practice in Lucretius, Philodemus, and Horace, Oxford, pp. 148–77, ISBN 0-19-508815-8.
- Barron, J.P.; Easterling, P.E.; Knox, B.M.W. (1985), "Elegy and Iambus", in P.E. Easterling; B.M.W. Knox (eds.), The Cambridge History of Classical Literature: Greek Literature, Cambridge, pp. 117–64, ISBN 978-0-521-21042-3.
- Bowie, E.L. (1986), "Early Greek Elegy, Symposium and Public Festival", The Journal of Hellenic Studies, 106: 13–35, doi:10.2307/629640, JSTOR 629640, S2CID 162738189.
- Bowie, E.L. (2008), "Semonides", in H. Cancik; H. Schneider (eds.), Brill's New Pauly: Antiquity, vol. 13 (Sas-Syl), ISBN 9789004142183.
- Hubbard, T.K. (1994), "Elemental Psychology and the Date of Semonides of Amorgos", American Journal of Philology, 115 (2): 175–97, doi:10.2307/295298, hdl:2152/31232, JSTOR 295298, S2CID 163635542.
- Hubbard, T.K. (1996), "'New Simonides' or Old Semonides? Second Thoughts on POxy 3965, fr. 26", in D.Boedeker; D. Sider (eds.), The New Simonides: Contexts of Praise and Desire, Oxford, pp. 226–31, ISBN 0-19-513767-1.
- Kurke, Leslie (1992), "The Politics of ἁβροσύνη in Archaic Greece", Classical Antiquity, 11: 91–120, doi:10.2307/25010964, JSTOR 25010964.
- Shipley, G. (1987), A History of Samos: 800–188 BC, Oxford, ISBN 9780198148685.
- West, M.L. (1974), Studies in Greek Elegy and Iambus, Berlin, ISBN 978-3110045857.
- West, M.L. (1983), Greek Metre, Oxford.
- West, M.L. (1996), "Semonides", in S. Hornblower; A. Spawforth (eds.), Oxford Classical Dictionary (3rd rev. ed.), Oxford, ISBN 9780198661726.
