= Types of Women =

Satirical poem by Semonides of Amorgos

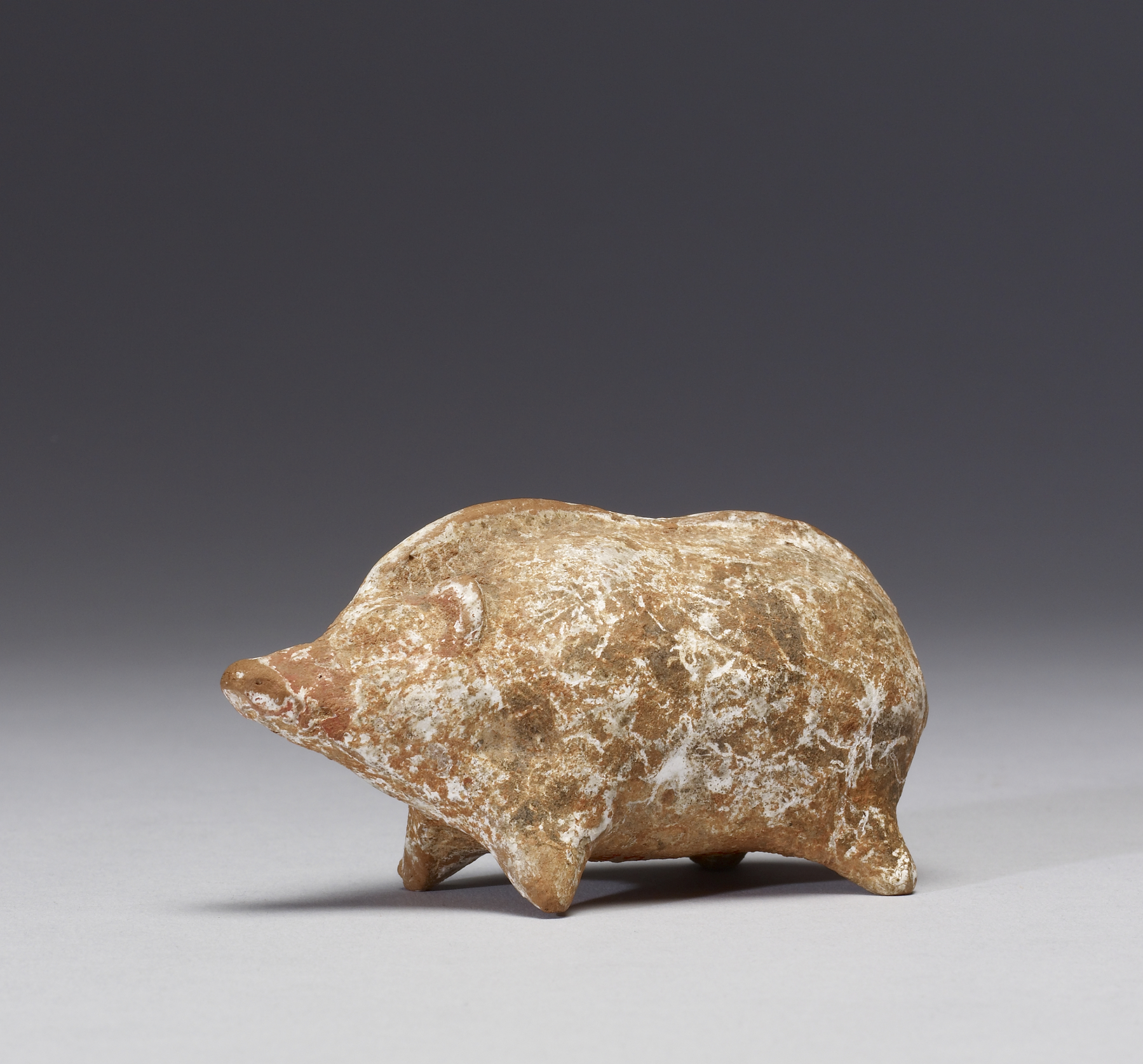
An archaic Greek sculpture of a pig, one of the animals which inspired "types" of women presented by Semonides

"Types of Women", also titled "Women", and described in critical editions as Semonides 7, is an Archaic Greek satirical poem written by Semonides of Amorgos in the seventh century BC. The poem is based on the idea that Zeus created men and women differently, and that he specifically created ten types of women based on different models from the natural world.

Semonides' poem was influenced by Hesiod's story of Pandora, told in both his Works and Days and his Theogony. The poem survives due to its inclusion in Joannes Stobaeus' Anthology. Despite the poem's length and its interest as evidence as to early Greek attitudes towards women, it has received little scholarly attention and has generally been considered to be of little literary merit.

== Poem ==
Semonides was active during the seventh century BC, though the "Types of Women" is preserved in the fifth-century AD Anthology of Joannes Stobaeus, which was first printed in 1535 by Vittore Trincavelli. The poem is 118 lines long, and written in iambic trimeter.

=== Content ===
The first 94 lines describe ten women, or types of women: seven are animals, two are elements, and the final woman is a bee. Of the ten types of women in the poem, nine are delineated as destructive: those who derive from the pig, fox, dog, earth, sea, donkey, ferret, (Note: The Greek, γαλῆς, can refer to "various animals of the weasel kind"; Hugh Lloyd-Jones argues that the ugliness of the creature described by Semonides makes it more likely that he is referring to the ferret than the weasel.Lloyd-Jones 1975, p. 76–7) mare, and monkey. Only the woman who comes from the bee is considered to make a good wife.

The second part of the poem consists of a complaint about the evils of women in general. The poem ends with a mythical example illustrating this point, after which the poem breaks off. It is not certain whether the poem originally ended here: Lloyd-Jones thinks that the ending as it stands is too abrupt, and suggests that there may have been a number of other mythical examples following the one which is preserved.

Leslie Schear disagrees, arguing that it is difficult to think of a mythical example from Greek mythology of a wife's treachery which can top that of Helen of Troy. The fact that this general condemnation of women follows so closely on from the praise of the bee-woman at the end of the first part of the poem is perhaps intended to suggest that though such a woman would be the ideal wife, she is a mirage; no real wives live up to the ideal bee-woman.

=== Literary context ===
The conceit of relating different women to different animals in the poem is not an invention of Semonides, but seems to have been based on a pre-existing folk tale. Aesop's fables were attributed in ancient Greece to the sixth-century BC slave of that name, but many of them are likely to be much older than that. One of these fables, that of Zeus and Prometheus, has a similar premise to Semonides' poem, and may have been known to him.

Later poets tell similar stories, probably also inspired by these folktales. An elegiac fragment by Phocylides describes women as having originated from one of four different creatures, all of which are also found in Semonides' poem. Similar stories are found in poems by Callimachus and Horace.

The "Types of Women" shows the clear influence of Hesiod, who tells the story of the creation of the first woman both in the Theogony and the Works and Days. Semonides apparently refers to Hesiod's work in other fragments, and so the poems were probably known to him. Nicole Loraux interprets Semonides' poem as "a polemical reading of Hesiod". She argues that while Hesiod treats all women as essentially similar, Semonides treats them separately – so while Pandora is, in Works and Days, made out of earth and water, with the soul of a dog and who is a "beautiful evil", in Semonides there is a dog-woman, an earth-woman, a water-woman, and a beautiful mare-woman, all separate but listed one after the other.

The poem also has similarities to a passage from Hesiod's Theogony in which men are compared to worker bees and women to drones. This passage is the earliest example of Greek misogynistic poetry, explaining how "the deadly female race and tribe of wives" bring harm to the men they live with. In contrast to Hesiod, who portrays the drone-woman as a drain on men's resources, Semonides' bee-woman is the only good wife. This laziness for which Hesiod condemns women is, for Semonides, a characteristic of three other types of woman – the earth-, donkey-, and mare-women.

=== Performance context ===
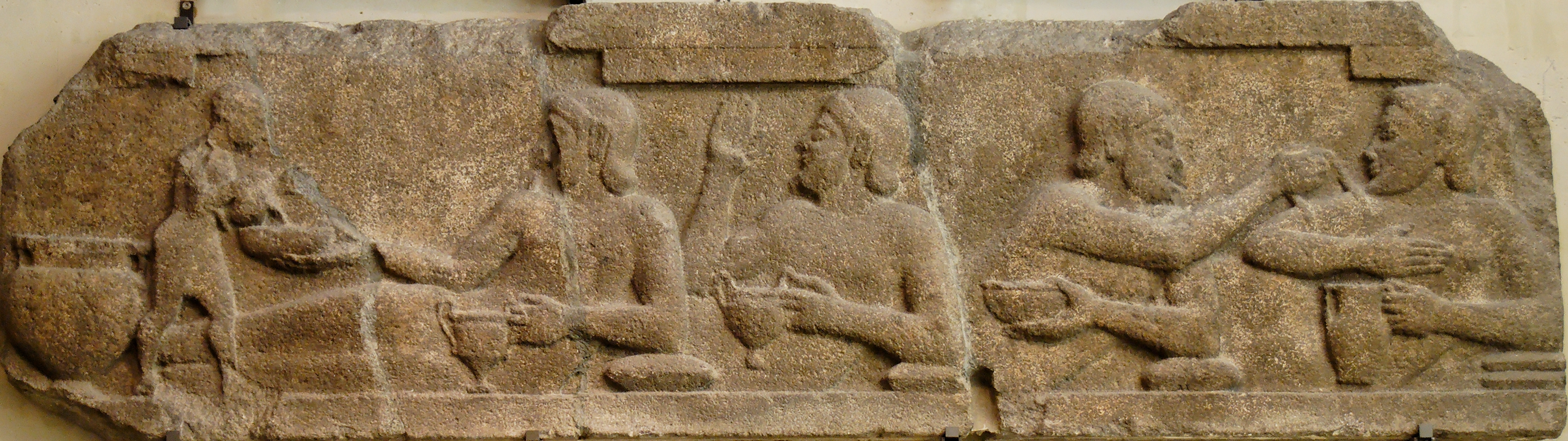
Symposium scene from the temple of Athena at Assos, sixth century BC

Semonides 7 is generally considered to have been written for performance in a symposium: Robin Osborne, for example, suggests that each description of a different kind of woman might be sung to a different guest. However, the treatment of women – as wives, rather than erotic or mythological figures – is significantly different from other sympotic poetry. Leslie Schear argues that the poem, with its focus on wives, is related to marriage. She suggests that it was intended as a poem to be performed at a wedding feast, initiating the new groom into the ranks of married men.

Other suggestions for the performance context of the poem include Ulrich von Wilamowitz-Moellendorff's argument that it was intended as a reply to the ritual abuse spoken by women at some festivals of Demeter. However, Hugh Lloyd-Jones disputes this, arguing that this ritual abuse "could hardly have provoked an answer on this or any other occasion". The poem might itself have been performed in an analogous ritual context, but these festivals would probably also have included women, and the poem seems to have been intended to be performed for an all-male audience.

== Significance ==
The poem, fragment 7 of Semonides, is notable for its length. At 118 lines, it is the longest surviving example of early Greek iambic poetry. Along with Hesiod's telling of the story of Pandora, it is one of the earliest texts attesting to the misogyny in ancient Greek thought. Despite both its length and its significance, the poem has received little attention from modern scholars.

The poem was probably written for sympotic performance. It is seen by Robin Osborne as an attempt to reinforce male power structures, which "depended on, and [were] constantly reinforced by, [the] abuse of women". Teresa Morgan notes, though, that despite the fact that the poem echoes patriarchal power-structures, men in the poem have surprisingly little control over their wives, who are able to misbehave in all the ways attributed to them in the poem.

As a text, the work has generally been received poorly by modern authors, who have described it as "pretty well without wit and lacking in charm of presentation". While it has been considered important as an insight into archaic modes of thought, critics such as Hermann Fränkel, have claimed that it has little literary value. Hugh Lloyd-Jones agrees that Semonides is not a "great poet", unlike his contemporary Archilochus, though Pat Easterling defends it as being "a lively and interesting poem" with "vivid use of everyday detail". Even Easterling however concludes that the poem is "intellectually undemanding".

== Bibliography ==
- Arthur, Marylin B. (1984). "Early Greece: The Origins of the Western Attitude Toward Women". In Peradotto, John; Sullivan, John Patrick (eds.). Women in the Ancient World: The Arethusa Papers. SUNY Press. pp. 46–47. ISBN 9780873957724.
- Easterling, P. E. (1985). "Semonides". In Easterling, P. E.; Knox, B. M. W. (eds.). The Cambridge History of Classical Literature Volume I: Greek Literature. Cambridge: Cambridge University Press. p. 156.
- Kirk, Athena (2021). Ancient Greek lists : catalogue and inventory across genres. Cambridge, United Kingdom. pp. 57–61. ISBN 9781108887397.
- Lefkowitz, Mary R. (1997). "Review of 'Females of the Species: Semonides on Women' by Hugh Lloyd-Jones". Signs. 2 (3): 690–92. doi:10.1086/493398. JSTOR 3173276.
- Lloyd-Jones, Hugh (1975). Females of the Species: Semonides on Women. Duckworth. ISBN 978-0715608845.
- Loraux, Nicole (1993). Children of Athena: Athenian Ideas about Citizenship and the Division Between the Sexes. Translated by Levine, Caroline. Princeton: Princeton University Press. pp. 72–110.
- Morgan, Teresa (2005). "The Wisdom of Semonides Fragment 7". The Cambridge Classical Journal. 51: 72–85. doi:10.1017/S1750270500000403. S2CID 170231661.
- North, Helen (1977). "The Mare, the Vixen, and the Bee: Sophrosyne as the virtue of women in antiquity". Illinois Classical Studies. 2: 35–49.
- Ormand, Kirk (2014). The Hesiodic Catalogue of Women and Archaic Greece. Cambridge University Press. ISBN 978-1-139-95241-5.
- Osborne, Robin (2001). "The Use of Abuse: Semonides 7". The Cambridge Classical Journal. 47: 47. doi:10.1017/S0068673500000699. S2CID 170587592.
- Payne, Mark (2010). The animal part : human and other animals in the poetic imagination. Chicago: University of Chicago Press. pp. 112–120. ISBN 9780226650852.
- Schear, Leslie (1984). "Semonides Fr. 7: Wives and their Husbands". Échos du Monde Classique. 28: 39–49.
