= Charmides (dialogue) =

Work of Plato

The Charmides (/ˈkɑːrmɪdiːz/; Ancient Greek: Χαρμίδης) is a dialogue of Plato, in which Socrates engages a handsome and popular boy named Charmides in a conversation about the meaning of sophrosyne, a Greek word usually translated into English as "temperance," "self-control," or "restraint." When the boy is unable to satisfy him with an answer, he next turns to the boy's mentor Critias. In the dialogue, Charmides and then later Critias champion that Temperance is "doing one's own work" but Socrates derides this as vague. The definition given next of "knowing oneself" seems promising but the question is then raised if something can even have the knowledge of itself as a base. As is typical with Platonic early dialogues, the two never arrive at a completely satisfactory definition, but the discussion nevertheless raises many important points. The Charmides is one of Plato's most homoerotic dialogues. Socrates admires Charmides' beauty at the beginning of the dialogue, saying "I saw inside his cloak and caught on fire and was quite beside myself."

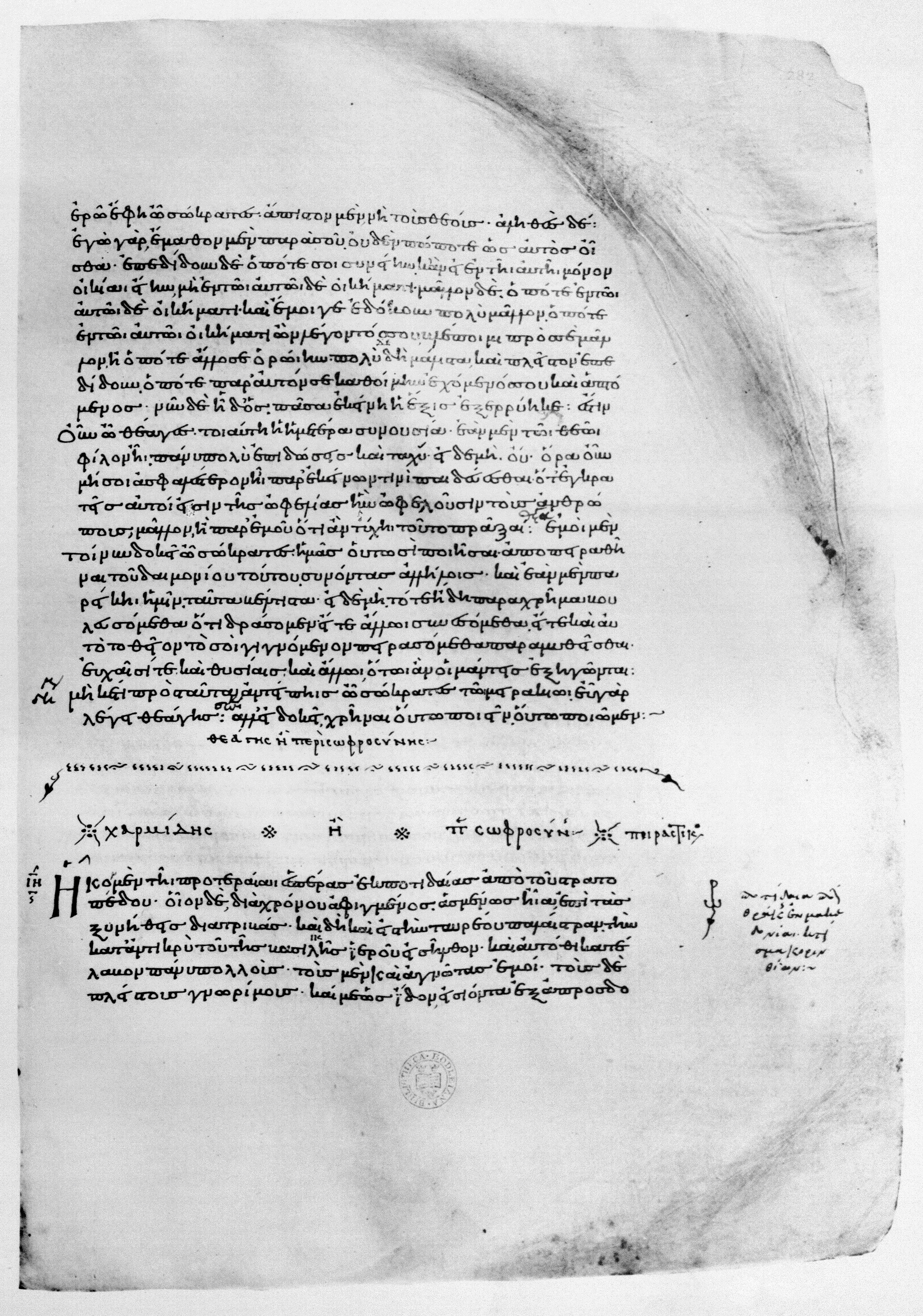
Charmides

== Characters ==
- Socrates the Athenian philosopher
- Charmides, the son of Dropidas, a handsome young boy and wrestler famed for his beauty and temperance
- Critias, Charmides' uncle and the most cruel and bloodthirsty of the Thirty Tyrants. His connection to Socrates was one of the main charges of scandal against him in the Apology. This dialogue ultimately tests his views of temperance.
- Chaerephon, enthusiastic friend of Socrates and jokingly described as "a kind of madman"

== Setting ==
Socrates narrates the dialogue, and says that he has just returned from a battle at Potidaea, a city besieged and conquered by the Athenians at the beginning of the Peloponnesian War. Socrates says that, shortly after returning home, he again sought out his habitual conversations by heading to the palaestra of Taureas, a wrestling school where boys gathered. With the help of Chaerephon, who pushes him for details about the battle, he finds his way to Critias and asks him about affairs at home, the present state of philosophy, and whether any of the boys had distinguished himself for wisdom or beauty, or both. Critias answers that Socrates will soon get to know the beauties firsthand, for Charmides and his entourage have just arrived.

Critias tells Socrates that Charmides is his cousin, son of his uncle Glaucon. Chaerephon rushes over and asks Socrates if the boy is not beautiful, and Socrates agrees with a poetic quote from Cydias. Chaerephon says suggestively that if Socrates could see his naked form, he would forget all about his handsome face. Socrates says all this will be good and well if the boy also has a noble soul. Socrates tells Critias that before they look at his body, they will ask the boy to strip and show them his soul.

Charmides was Plato's uncle, his mother's brother. Critias, Socrates' other interlocutor, was Charmides' first cousin, making Plato Critias' first cousin once removed. Both Critias and Charmides went on to become important members of the Thirty Tyrants, the short-lived oligarchic regime that was established following Athenian defeat in the Peloponnesian War in 404 BCE, making the question of their sophrosyne, or moderation, alternatively ironic or pressing.

This is generally considered one of Plato's earlier dialogues based on analysis of his writing and the fact that it ends in aporia. Some critics like Johann Gottfried Stallbaum traced the dialogue back to the period before the Thirty Tyrants' reign of tyranny over Athens, around 405 BC, while the majority bring it back much later, around 388, after the death of Socrates.

== Struggle to define ==
Socrates tells Critias that there would be no shame in his just talking to the beautiful and popular boy, even if he were younger than he is. Socrates informs the reader that Critias is the child's guardian or caretaker (ἐπίτροπος, literally "one to whom the charge of anything is entrusted") (155a). Critias agrees and tells an attendant to tell Charmides to come and see the physician ("iatros") about an illness that Charmides has complained about. Critias suggests that Socrates pretend to know a cure for a headache to lure the boy over.

Charmides approaches and tells Socrates about his ailment. Socrates responds that he can find a cure he heard of from Zalmoxis but in order for the cure to work, the patient must have a good soul and possess temperance. Charmides is ashamed to reply that he has temperance as he feels it will make him look vain. Socrates asks him that first instead of answering if he has it that maybe they should provide a definition of what it is exactly. That way they can have a metric to judge the character of Charmides' temperance with.

Charmides first suggests that sophrosyne is a kind of quietness or slowness (159b). Socrates talks him out of this because quickness, energetic attitude and agility are more useful to learning than quietness or slowness. Next Charmides proposes that sophrosyne is the same as modesty. Socrates says this can't be right because Homer (whose authority they both accept on this point) says that modesty is not good for all people, but it is agreed that sophrosyne is (160e). Charmides proposes that temperance is minding your own business. Socrates finds this particularly offensive, and tells Charmides that he must have heard this from some fool (162b). Socrates can tell from the uneasy look on Critias face that this was his idea, and they exchange some words. Critias accuses Charmides of misrepresenting him. Socrates says to him testily that at his age, Charmides can hardly be expected to understand temperance (162e). At this point in the argument, Critias takes up the argument with Socrates suggesting that temperance might be the same as self-knowledge. Socrates confesses as they discuss this that his motive in refuting Critias is to examine himself, that he pursues the argument for his own sake (166c-d).

Critias says that "to work" and "to make" are two completely different things and this is the basis for Socrates misunderstanding him. Critias quotes the authority of Hesiod who said "no work is dishonorable." He says that you have to use context and the quote clearly means noble professions such as shoemaking and not ignoble ones such as prostitution. He says that Hesiod would agree with him that anyone who is good and follows his noble profession is temperate. Socrates responds by asking if those who do good always know they are doing good. Critias says temperate men can not be ignorant of their own temperance and Socrates rebukes him by mentioning that doctors or physicians can sometimes do good to both themselves and others without even knowing it. This definition is then discarded.

Critias next suggests temperance is self-knowledge. Socrates asks what product this knowledge makes and Critias says not all knowledge creates a product. Socrates finds this answer unreasonable. Critias' suggestion that sophrosyne is self-knowledge spurs Socrates to a discussion of the relation between medicine and science. He says that medicine is the science of health and disease, and that a person who does not understand these things is not in a position to distinguish a real physician from a quack (171c). He says that if wisdom is the science of knowing what you know and knowing what you don't know, no one would ever make a mistake, and we would pass through life without erring. He concludes that this does not happen, therefore this definition of wisdom is inaccurate.

Socrates asks Critias what type of knowledge wisdom is. He suggests a prophet or sooth-sayer and Critias agrees. Socrates asks him by what knowledge do these people become wise. Is it the knowledge of fortune games? or of health? Critias responds in the negative and concludes to him it's "the knowledge of good and evil." Socrates likes this answer and says that knowledge of other things like health are useless unless you understand good from evil.

Socrates says he dreams, however, of a world in which no one pretends to be something he is not (173a-d). In the end, Socrates appears to have recruited a new disciple to philosophy: Charmides says he is willing to be charmed every day by Socrates, and Critias tells the boy that if he is willing to do this, he will have proof of his temperance. Charmides says that if his guardian instructs him to submit to Socrates' charms, then he would be wrong not to do it.

Socrates' analogy, that ignorance is to the philosopher what disease is to the physician, is important and persistent in the dialogues. And everywhere, Socrates fails to effect a cure. In the Protagoras, for example, when the sophist Prodicus accuses Socrates of making a mess of their discussion, Socrates accepts the complaint and calls himself a laughable doctor (geloios iatros), whose treatment not only does not cure the disease, it worsens it (Protagoras 340e).

A variation on the medical theme is in the Theaetetus, where Socrates compares himself to a midwife who helps boys and men give birth to their ideas. He says there that he (never having conceived of a viable idea himself) is barren, and has frequently had to commit the intellectual equivalent of infanticide (Theaetetus 160e).

== Texts and translations ==
- Charmides, in a collection of Plato's Dialogues at Standard Ebooks
- Charmides public domain audiobook at LibriVox
- The Internet Classics Archive
- Thomas Taylor, 1804
- Benjamin Jowett, 1870: full text
- Walter Rangeley Maitland Lamb, 1927: online
- Rosamond Kent Sprague, 1973
- Thomas G. West and Grace Starry West, 1986
