= Cydias =

Cydias (Ancient Greek: Κυδίας), a native of Cythnus, who was living in 364 BC, may be presumed to have been a painter of considerable ability, as one of his pictures, representing Jason and his followers embarking for Colchis, in search of the Golden Fleece, was purchased at Rome by the orator Hortensius for 144,000 sesterces. Afterwards the work was bought by Marcus Agrippa and placed in the Porticus of Neptune to commemorate his naval victories.

He also seems to have been a somewhat famous poet as in the Charmides, Socrates attributes a homoerotic verse to him. Socrates quotes this verse while describing his lust for Charmides's youthful body. As the painter started working later in Plato's own life, this Cydias may refer to a different, unspecified person.

== Poetry ==
- "not to bring the fawn in the sight of the lion to be devoured by him" - fragment of unspecified poem
