= Sophrosyne =

Ancient Greek concept of an ideal of excellence of character and soundness of mind

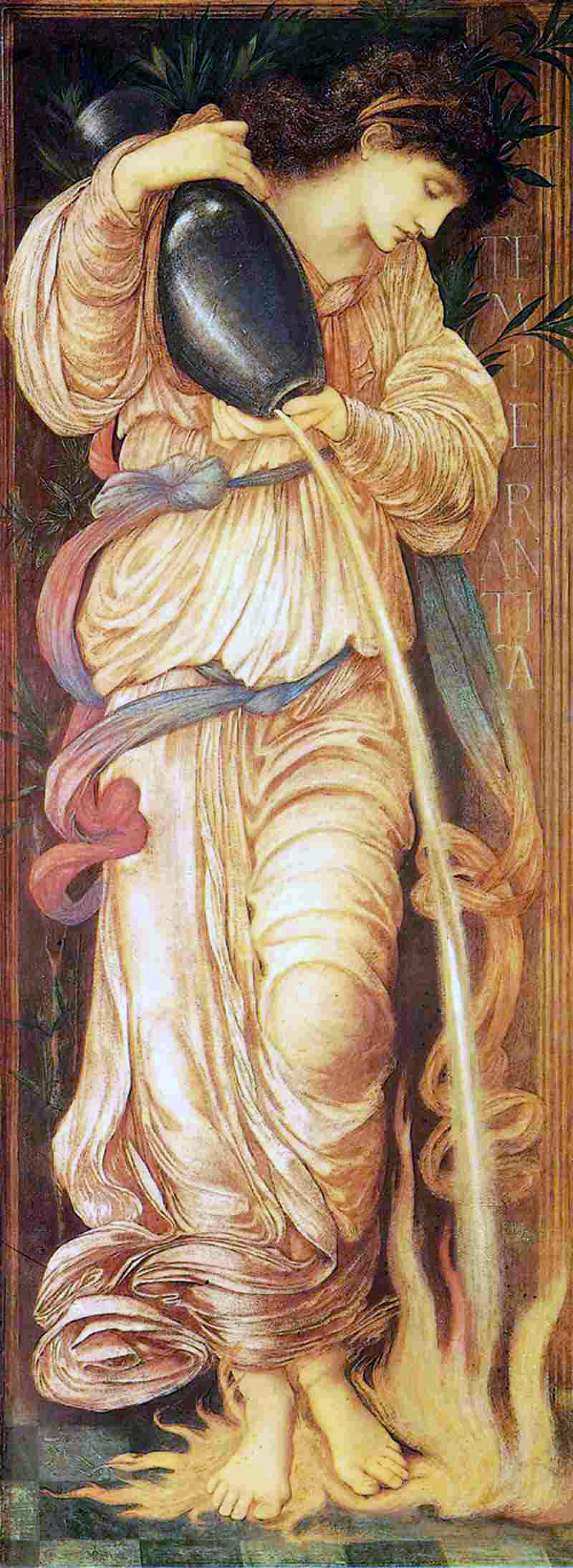
Temperantia (1872), by Edward Burne-Jones

Sophrosyne (Ancient Greek: σωφροσύνη) is an ancient Greek concept of an ideal of excellence of character and soundness of mind, which when combined in one well-balanced individual leads to other qualities, such as temperance, moderation, prudence, purity, decorum, and self-control. An adjectival form is "sophron".

It is similar to the concepts of zhōngyōng (中庸) of Chinese Confucianism and sattva (सत्त्व) of Indian thought.

== Ancient Greek literature ==
In Ancient Greek literature, sophrosyne is considered an important quality and is sometimes contrasted with hubris. A noted example of this occurs in Homer's The Iliad. When Agamemnon decides to take the queen Briseis away from Achilles, it is seen as Agamemnon behaving with hubris and lacking sophrosyne. In Homer's Odyssey, Odysseus avoids being turned into an animal by Circe the enchantress by means of a magical herb, moly (symbolizing, by some accounts, sophrosyne), given to him by Athena (Wisdom) and Hermes (Reason).

Heraclitus's fragment 112 states:

σωφρονεῖν ἀρετὴ μεγίστη, καὶ σοφίη ἀληθέα λέγειν καὶ ποιεῖν κατὰ φύσιν ἐπαίοντας

Translation:

Sophrosyne is the greatest virtue, and wisdom is speaking and acting the truth, paying heed to the nature of things

Themes connected with sophrosyne and hubris figure prominently in plays of Aeschylus, Sophocles, and Euripides. Sophrosyne is recognized as a virtue, although debased forms of it, like prudery, are criticized. Sophrosyne is a theme in the play Hippolytus by Euripides, in which sophrosyne is represented by the goddess Artemis and is personified by the character Hippolytus.

=== Goddess ===
The 6th-century BCE poet Theognis of Megara mentions Sophrosyne as among the daimona that were released from Pandora's jar.

Hope is the only good god remaining among mankind;
the others have left and gone to Olympus.
Trust, a mighty god has gone, Restraint (Sophrosyne) has gone from men,
and the Graces, my friend, have abandoned the earth.

=== Plato ===
Sophrosyne is an important topic for Plato. It is the main subject of the dialogue Charmides, wherein several definitions are proposed but no conclusion reached; however in the dramatic context it connotes moral purity and innocence. An etymological meaning of sophrosyne as "preservation of thoughtfulness" is proposed in Cratylus 411e. The ability to manage with temperance and with justice (σωφρόνως καὶ δικαίως) is offered as a definition of virtue in the Meno (73a). Plato's view of sophrosyne is related to Pythagorean harmonia (Republic 430e−432a, 442c) and closely linked with Plato’s tripartite division of the soul: sophrosyne is the harmonious moderation of the appetitive and spirited parts of the soul by the rational part (e.g., Phaedrus 237c−238e).

=== Aristotle ===
Aristotle included discussions of sophrosyne in his pioneering system of virtue ethics.

Aristotle believed sophrosyne described "a mean with regard to pleasures," distinct from self-indulgence on the one hand, or perhaps anhedonia on the other. Like courage, sophrosyne is a virtue concerning our discipline of "the irrational parts of our nature" (fear, in the case of courage; desire, in the case of sophrosyne).

His discussion is found in the Nicomachean Ethics Book III, chapters 10–12, and concludes in this way:

And so the appetites of temperate men (σώφρωνος) should be in harmony with their reason; for the aim of both is that which is noble: the temperate man (σώφρων) desires what he ought, and as he ought, and when he ought; and this again is what reason prescribes. This, then, may be taken as an account of sophrosynes (σωφροσύνης).

As with virtue generally, sophrosyne is a sort of habit, acquired by practice. It is a state of character, not a passion or a faculty, specifically a disposition to choose the mean between excess and deficit. The mean is hard to attain, and is grasped by perception, not by reasoning.

Pleasure in doing virtuous acts is a sign that one has attained a virtuous disposition. Sophrosyne is the alignment of our desires with what will produce eudaimonia, such that we desire to do what is best for our own flourishing.

=== After Aristotle ===
For the Stoic, Zeno of Citium, sophrosyne is one of the four chief virtues. Later Stoics like Musonius Rufus, Seneca, Epictetus, and Marcus Aurelius took a practical view of sophrosyne and share a definition of it as the restraint of the appetites.

Demophilus, a Pythagorean philosopher of uncertain date, wrote:

Ρώμη ψυχής σωφροσύνη αύτη γαρ ψυχής απαθούς φώς εστιν

Translation:

The vigor of the soul is sophrosyne, the light of a soul free of disturbing passions.

Cicero considered four Latin terms to translate sophrosyne: temperantia (temperance), moderatio (moderateness), modestia (modesty), and frugalitas (frugality). Through the writings of Lactantius, St. Ambrose and St. Augustine, the virtue's meaning as temperance or "proper mixture" became the dominant view in subsequent Western European thought.

Sophrosyne, according to St. Thomas Aquinas, is the fourth and final cardinal virtue.

It is also mentioned in the work On Virtues (Greek: Περὶ ἀρετῶν) by Georgios Gemistos Plethon.

== See also ==
- Seven virtues
