= Pistis =

Greek mythological personification of trust

In Greek mythology, Pistis (/ˈpɪstɪs/; Ancient Greek: Πίστις) was the personification of good faith, trust and reliability. In Christianity and in the New Testament, pistis is typically translated as "faith". The word is mentioned together with such other personifications as Elpis (Hope), sophrosyne (Prudence), and the Charites, who were all associated with honesty and harmony among people.

Her Roman equivalent was Fides, a personified concept significant in Roman culture.

Additionally, a close linkage between pistis and persuasion developed through the discussion of faith (belief) and was further morphed by an understanding of pistis as a rhetorical technique.

== In rhetoric ==
Pistis in rhetoric can mean "proof" and is the element to induce true judgment through enthymemes, hence to give "proof" of a statement. There are three modes by which this is employed. The first mode is the "subject matter capable of inducing a state of mind within the audience." The second pistis is the "subject itself considered under an appeal to the intellect or in its logical aspects." The third pistis is the "logical, rational, and intellectual aspect of the issue under discussion." All three modes of pistis occur in logos as it appeals to logical persuasion.

== Greek rhetoric and Christianity ==
New Testament translators favor the English word "faith" when translating pistis. Some have argued that the Christian concept of faith (pistis) was borrowed from Greek rhetorical notions of pistis, perhaps making "argument" a better translation than "faith". Christian pistis deems its persuasion in a positive light as the New Testament concepts of pistis require that a listener be knowledgeable of the subject matter at issue and thus able to fully assent. Whereas, the Greeks took the notion of pistis as persuasive discourse that was elliptical and concentrated on the "affect and effect rather than on the representation of the truth". The evolution of pistis in Christianity as a persuasive rhetorical technique starkly contrasts with its meaning used by the Greeks. More recent scholarship has argued for a more robust understanding of pistis that moved beyond a concept of "belief". Teresa Morgan has argued for the concept of "trust". Matthew Bates argues for "allegiance".

== See also ==
- Faith
- Faith in Christianity
