= Pandora =

Greek mythological figure

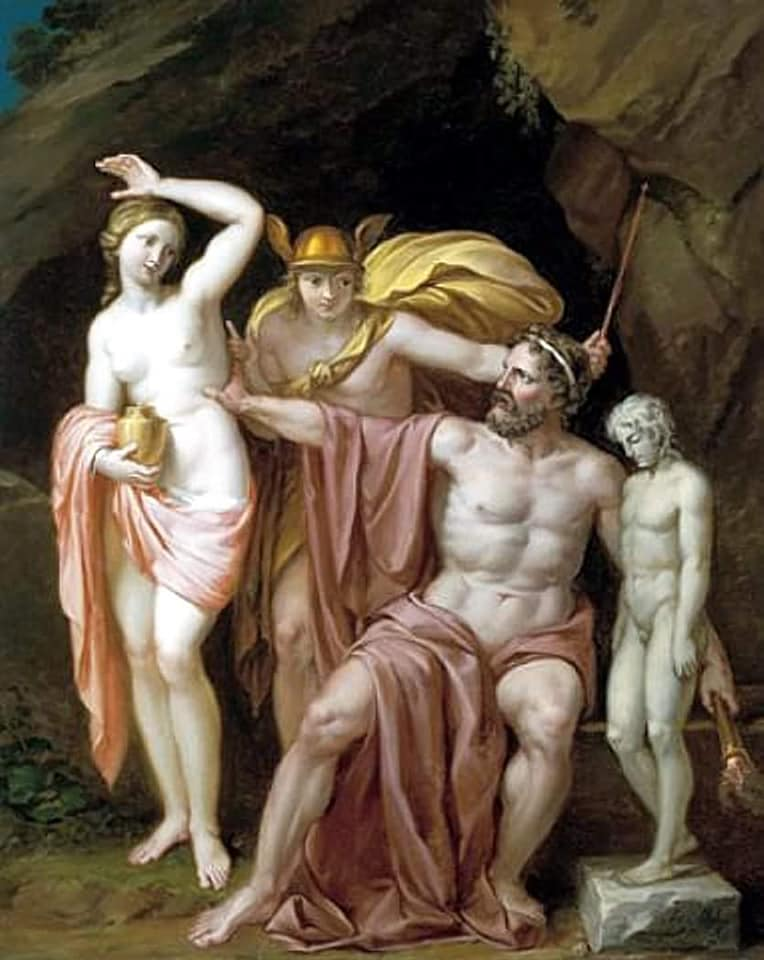
Pandora holding a pithos, with Hermes and a seated Prometheus in painting entitled Prometheus, Mercury, and Pandora, 1814, by Josef Abel

In Greek mythology, Pandora (Note: Ancient Greek: Πανδώρα, derived from πᾶν, pān, i.e. 'all', and δῶρον, dōron, i.e. 'gift'; thus 'the all-endowed', 'all-gifted' or 'all-giving'.) was the first human woman, created by Hephaestus on the instructions of Zeus. As Hesiod related it, each deity cooperated by giving her unique gifts. Her other name—inscribed against her figure on a white-ground kylix in the British Museum—is Anesidora. (Note: Ancient Greek: Ἀνησιδώρα, romanized: she who sends up gifts (up implying 'from below' within the earth).)

The Pandora myth is a kind of theodicy, addressing the question of why there is evil in the world, according to which, Pandora opened a jar (pithos; commonly referred to as "Pandora's jar") releasing all the evils of humanity. It has been argued that Hesiod's interpretation of Pandora's story went on to influence both Jewish and Christian theology and so perpetuated her bad reputation into the Renaissance. Later poets, dramatists, painters, and sculptors made her their subject. Prior to the Renaissance, the container was translated correctly as "a jar" and it was said to have contained "blessings" for humanity.

== Hesiod ==
Hesiod, both in his Theogony (briefly, without naming Pandora outright, line 570) and in Works and Days, gives the earliest version of the Pandora story.

=== Theogony ===
The Pandora myth first appeared in lines 560–612 of Hesiod's poem in epic meter, the Theogony (c. 8th–7th centuries BCE), without ever giving the woman a name. After humans received the stolen gift of fire from Prometheus, an angry Zeus decides to give humanity a punishing gift to compensate for the boon they had been given. He commands Hephaestus to mold from earth the first woman, a "beautiful evil" whose descendants would torment the human race. After Hephaestus does so, Athena dresses her in a silvery gown, an embroidered veil, garlands, and an ornate crown of silver. This woman goes unnamed in the Theogony, but is presumably Pandora, whose myth Hesiod revisited in Works and Days. When she first appears before gods and mortals, "wonder seized them" as they looked upon her. But she was "sheer guile, not to be withstood by men". Hesiod elaborates (590–93):

For from her is the race of women and female kind: of her is the deadly race and tribe of women who live amongst mortal men to their great trouble, no helpmeets in hateful poverty, but only in wealth.

Hesiod goes on to lament that men who try to avoid the evil of women by avoiding marriage will fare no better (604–7):

[He] reaches deadly old age without anyone to tend his years, and though he at least has no lack of livelihood while he lives, yet, when he is dead, his kinsfolk divide his possessions amongst them.

Hesiod concedes that occasionally a man finds a good wife, but still (609) "evil contends with good".

=== Works and Days ===
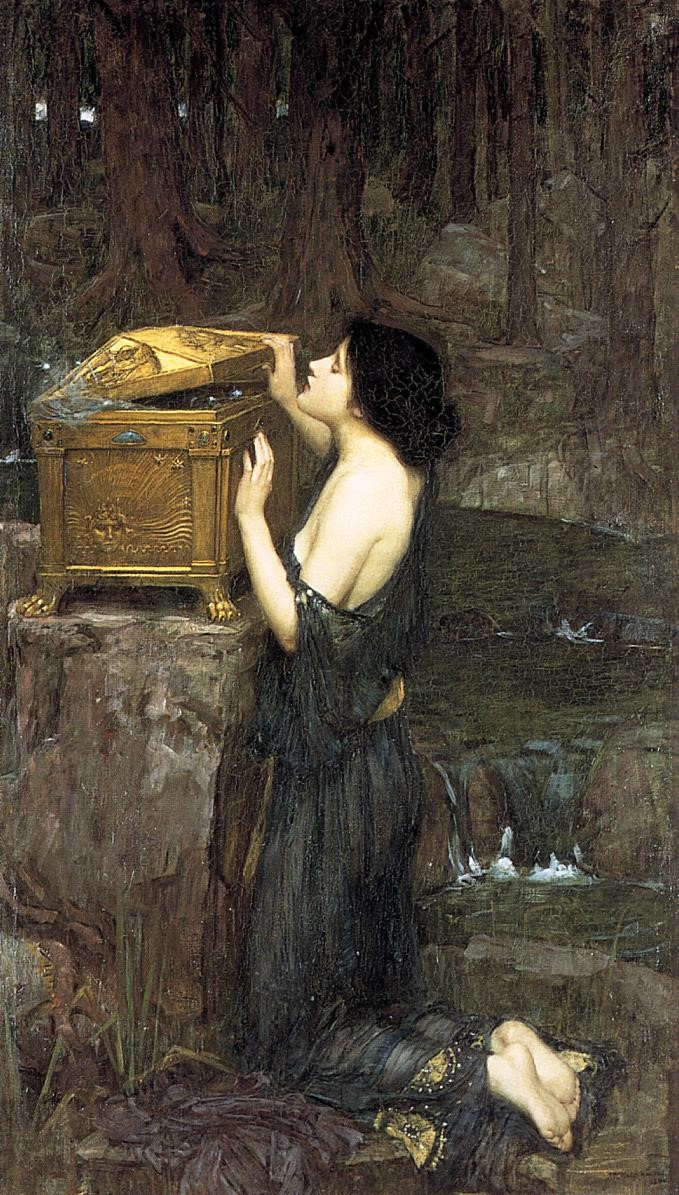
Pandora by John William Waterhouse, 1896

The more famous version of the Pandora myth comes from another of Hesiod's poems, Works and Days. In this version of the myth (lines 60–105), Hesiod expands upon her origin and moreover widens the scope of the misery she inflicts on humanity. As before, she is created by Hephaestus, but now more gods contribute to her completion (63–82): Athena taught her needlework and weaving (63–4); Aphrodite "shed grace upon her head and cruel longing and cares that weary the limbs" (65–6); Hermes gave her "a shameless mind and a deceitful nature" (67–8); Hermes also gave her the power of speech, putting in her "lies and crafty words" (77–80); Athena then clothed her (72); next Persuasion and the Charites adorned her with necklaces and other finery (72–4); the Horae adorned her with a garland crown (75). Finally, Hermes gives this woman a name: "Pandora [i.e. "All-Gift"], because all they who dwelt on Olympus gave each a gift, a plague to men who eat bread" (81–2).

In this retelling of her story, Pandora's deceitful feminine nature becomes the least of humanity's worries. For she brings with her a jar (which, due to textual corruption in the sixteenth century, came to be called a box) containing "countless plagues" (100). Prometheus had (fearing further reprisals) warned his brother Epimetheus not to accept any gifts from Zeus. But Epimetheus did not listen; he accepted Pandora, who promptly scattered the contents of her jar. As a result, Hesiod tells us, the earth and sea are "full of evils" (101). One item, however, did not escape the jar (96–9):

Only Hope remained there in an unbreakable home within under the rim of the great jar, and did not fly out at the door; for ere that, the lid of the jar stopped her, by the will of Aegis-holding Zeus who gathers the clouds.

Hesiod does not say why Hope (Elpis) remained in the jar. Hesiod closes with a moral (105): there is "no way to escape the will of Zeus."

After recounting this tale, Hesiod moves on to what he describes as "another story" (ἕτερο[ς] λόγο[ς]), telling of humanity's decline through five ages: the Golden, Silver, Bronze, Heroic, and Iron. According to Geoffrey Kirk, in Hesiod's arrangement of the two myths, Pandora's status as the world's first woman would seem to imply that only men existed in the Golden Age. In Stephanie Nelson's view, the two stories are "irreconcilable", as Pandora cannot be placed within any of the five ages. She writes that the world moves from good to evil "within the Pandora myth", whereas in the story of the five ages this occurs "between the various ages". Helen Van Noorden argues that the latter myth should be understood as an "alternative" to the story of Pandora, rather than a "free-standing construction".

=== Post Hesiod ===
Following Hesiod, Archaic and Classic Greek literature seem to make little further mention of Pandora, but mythographers later filled in minor details or added postscripts to Hesiod's account. For example, the Bibliotheca and Hyginus each make explicit what might be latent in the Hesiodic text: Epimetheus married Pandora. Hyginus's Fabulae retains this detail and adds that, rather than merely giving gifts, Athena (Minerva) was also the one who granted Pandora life.

They each add that the couple had a daughter, Pyrrha, who married Deucalion and survived the deluge with him. In the 15th-century AD an attempt was made to conjoin pagan and scriptural narrative by the monk Annio da Viterbo, who claimed to have found an account by the ancient Chaldean historian Berossus in which "Pandora" was named as a daughter-in-law of Noah in the alternative flood narrative.

== Pithos into "box" ==
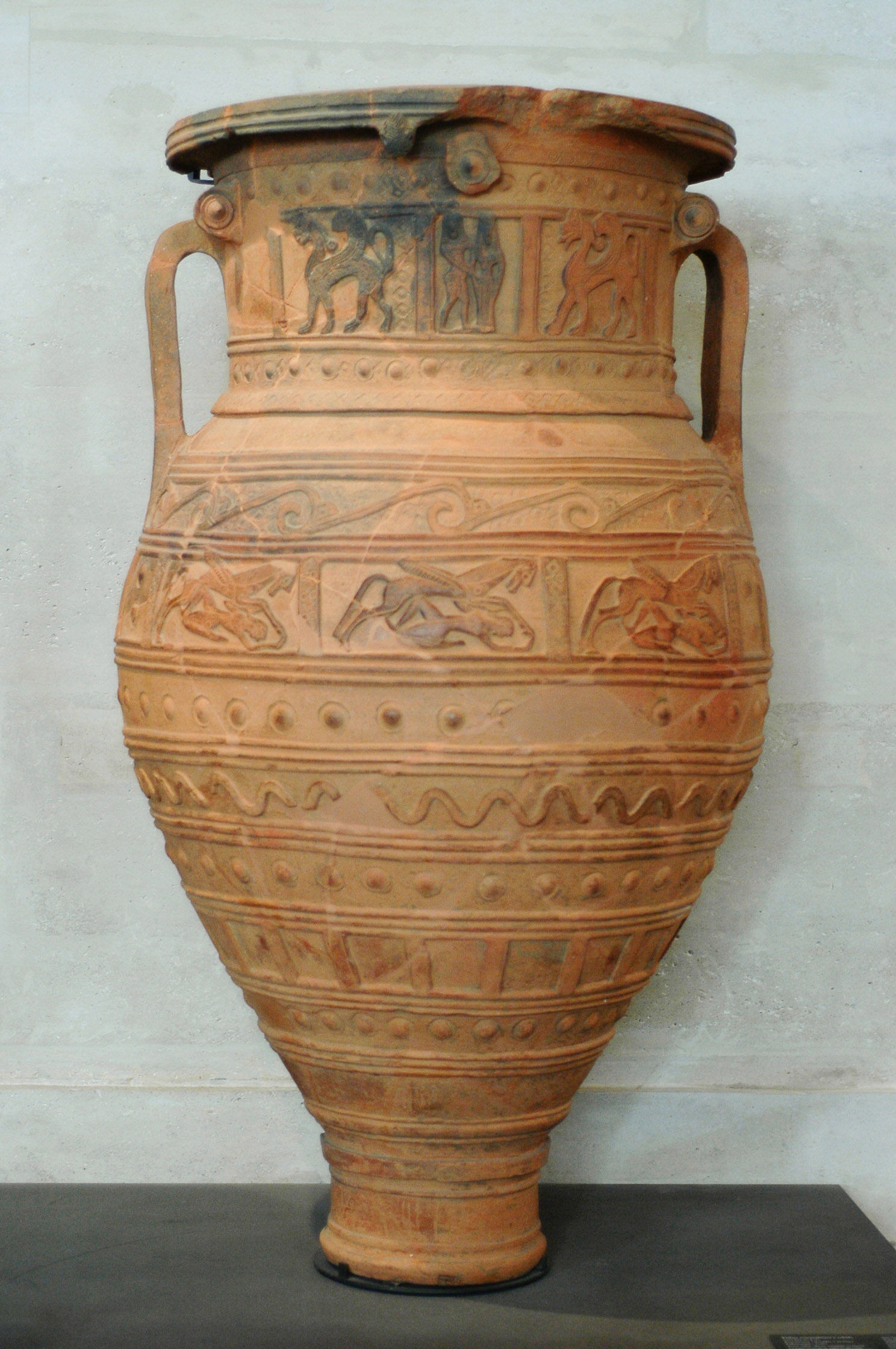
A pithos from Crete, c. 675 BC (Louvre Museum)

The mistranslation of pithos, a large storage jar, as "box" is usually attributed to the sixteenth century humanist Erasmus of Rotterdam when he translated Hesiod's tale of Pandora into Latin. Hesiod's pithos refers to a large storage jar, often half-buried in the ground, used for wine, oil or grain. It can also refer to a funerary jar. Erasmus, however, translated pithos into the Latin word pyxis, meaning "box". The inaccurate phrase "Pandora's box" has endured ever since in popular references.

== Difficulties of interpretation ==
Historic interpretations of the Pandora figure are rich enough to have offered Dora and Erwin Panofsky scope for monographic treatment. M. L. West writes that the story of Pandora and her jar is from a pre-Hesiodic myth, and that this explains the confusion and problems with Hesiod's version and its inconclusiveness. He writes that in earlier myths, Pandora was married to Prometheus, and cites the ancient Hesiodic Catalogue of Women as preserving this older tradition, and that the jar may have at one point contained only good things for humanity. He also writes that it may have been that Epimetheus and Pandora and their roles were transposed in the pre-Hesiodic myths, a "mythic inversion". He remarks that there is a curious correlation between Pandora being made out of earth in Hesiod's story, to what is in the Bibliotheca that Prometheus created man from water and earth. Hesiod's myth of Pandora's jar, then, could be an amalgam of many variant early myths.

The meaning of Pandora's name, according to the myth provided in Works and Days, is "all-gifted". However, according to others, Pandora more properly means "all-giving". Certain vase paintings dated to the 5th century BCE likewise indicate that the pre-Hesiodic myth of the goddess Pandora endured for centuries after the time of Hesiod. An alternative name for Pandora attested on a white-ground kylix (ca. 460 BCE) is Anesidora, which similarly means "she who sends up gifts". This vase painting clearly depicts Hephaestus and Athena putting the finishing touches on the first woman, as in the Theogony. Written above this figure (a convention in Greek vase painting) is the name Anesidora. More commonly, however, the epithet anesidora is applied to Gaea or Demeter. In view of such evidence, William E. Phipps has pointed out, "Classics scholars suggest that Hesiod reversed the meaning of the name of an earth goddess called Pandora (all-giving) or Anesidora (one-who-sends-up-gifts). Vase paintings and literary texts give evidence of Pandora as a mother earth figure who was worshipped by some Greeks. The main English commentary on Works and Days states that Hesiod shows no awareness [of this]."

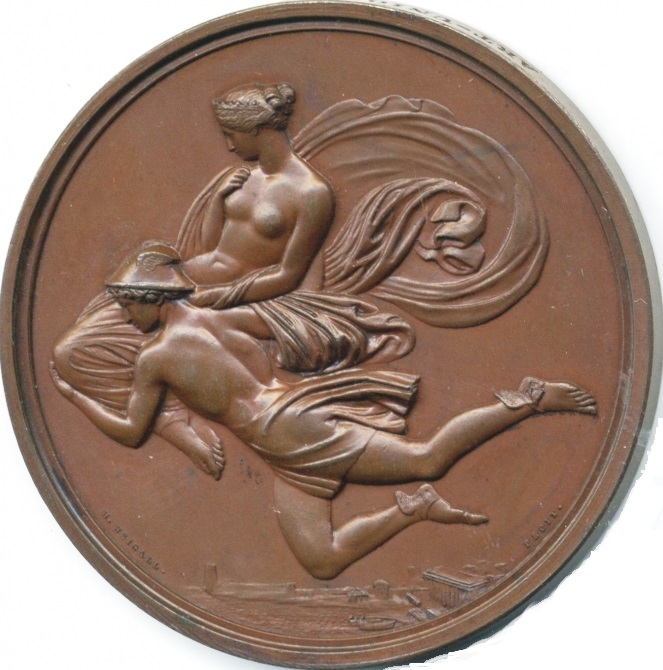
Hermes carrying Pandora down from Mount Olympus, a medal based on a design by John Flaxman

Jane Ellen Harrison also turned to the repertory of vase-painters to shed light on aspects of myth that were left unaddressed or disguised in literature. On a fifth-century amphora in the Ashmolean Museum (her fig.71) the half-figure of Pandora emerges from the ground, her arms upraised in the epiphany gesture, to greet Epimetheus. A winged ker with a fillet hovers overhead: "Pandora rises from the earth; she is the Earth, giver of all gifts," Harrison observes. Over time this "all-giving" goddess somehow devolved into an "all-gifted" mortal woman. A. H. Smith, however, noted that in Hesiod's account Athena and the Seasons brought wreaths of grass and spring flowers to Pandora, indicating that Hesiod was conscious of Pandora's original "all-giving" function. For Harrison, therefore, Hesiod's story provides "evidence of a shift from matriarchy to patriarchy in Greek culture. As the life-bringing goddess Pandora is eclipsed, the death-bringing human Pandora arises." Thus, Harrison concludes "in the patriarchal mythology of Hesiod her great figure is strangely changed and diminished. She is no longer Earth-Born, but the creature, the handiwork of Olympian Zeus." (Harrison 1922:284). Robert Graves, quoting Harrison, asserts of the Hesiodic episode that "Pandora is not a genuine myth, but an anti-feminist fable, probably of his own invention." H. J. Rose wrote that the myth of Pandora is decidedly more illiberal than that of epic in that it makes Pandora the origin of all of Man's woes with her being the exemplification of the bad wife.

The Hesiodic myth did not, however, completely obliterate the memory of the all-giving goddess Pandora. A scholium to line 971 of Aristophanes' The Birds mentions a cult "to Pandora, the earth, because she bestows all things necessary for life". And in fifth-century Athens, Pandora made a prominent appearance in what, at first, appears an unexpected context, in a marble relief or bronze appliqués as a frieze along the base of the Athena Parthenos, the culminating experience on the Acropolis. Jeffrey M. Hurwit has interpreted her presence there as an "anti-Athena." Both were motherless, and reinforced via opposite means the civic ideologies of patriarchy and the "highly gendered social and political realities of fifth-century Athens"—Athena by rising above her sex to defend it, and Pandora by embodying the need for it. Meanwhile, Pausanias (i.24.7) merely noted the subject and moved on.

== Artistic representations ==
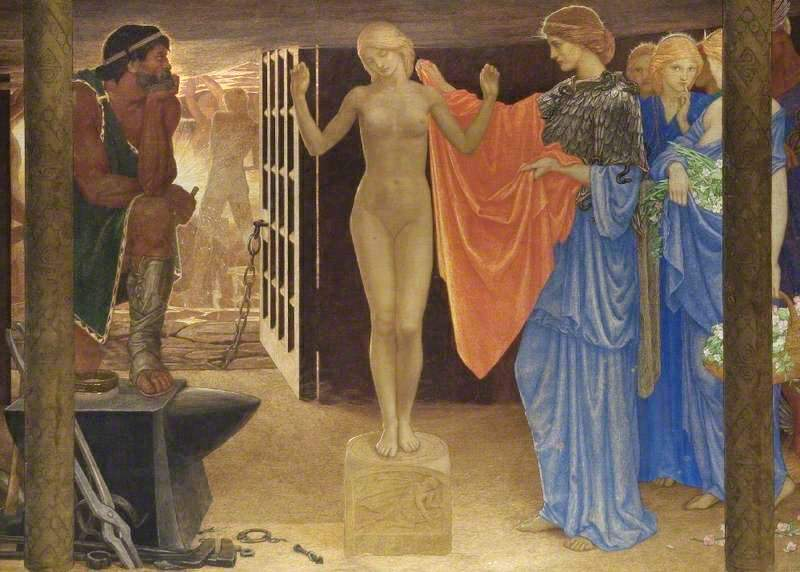
Hammer-wielding workmen appear through a doorway, while in the foreground Hephaestus broods on the as yet unanimated figure of "Pandora" in the painting by John D. Batten, The Creation of Pandora, 1913, tempera on fresco, 128 × 168 cm, Reading University

Images of Pandora began to appear on Greek pottery as early as the 5th century BCE, although identification of the scene represented is sometimes ambiguous. An independent tradition that does not square with any of the Classical literary sources is in the visual repertory of Attic red-figure vase-painters, which sometimes supplements, sometimes ignores, the written testimony; in these representations the upper part of Pandora is visible rising from the earth, "a chthonic goddess like Gaia herself." Sometimes, but not always, she is labeled Pandora. In some cases the figure of Pandora emerging from the earth is surrounded by figures carrying hammers in what has been suggested as a scene from a satyr play by Sophocles, Pandora, or The Hammerers, of which only fragments remain. But there have also been alternative interpretations of such scenes.

In the late Pre-Raphaelite painting by John D. Batten, hammer-wielding workmen appear through a doorway, while in the foreground Hephaestus broods on the as yet unanimated figure of "Pandora". There were also earlier English paintings of the newly created Pandora as surrounded by the heavenly gods presenting gifts, a scene also depicted on ancient Greek pottery. In one case it was part of a decorative scheme painted on the ceiling at Petworth House by Louis Laguerre in about 1720. William Etty's Pandora Crowned by the Seasons of a century later is similarly presented as an apotheosis taking place among the clouds.

In between these two had come James Barry's huge Birth of Pandora, on which he laboured for over a decade at the turn of the nineteenth century. Well before that he was working on the design, which was intended to reflect his theoretical writings on the interdependence between history painting and the way it should reflect the ideal state. An early drawing, only preserved now in the print made of it by Luigi Schiavonetti, follows the account of Hesiod and shows Pandora being adorned by the Graces and the Hours while the gods look on. Its ideological purpose, however, was to demonstrate an equal society unified by the harmonious function of those within it. But in the actual painting which followed much later, a subordinated Pandora is surrounded by gift-bearing gods and Minerva stands near her, demonstrating the feminine arts proper to her passive role. The shift is back to the culture of blame whenever she steps outside it.

In the individual representations of Pandora that were to follow, her idealisation is as a dangerous type of beauty, generally naked or semi-naked. She is only differentiated from other paintings or statues of such females by being given the attribute of a jar or, increasingly in the 19th century, a straight-sided box. As well as the many European paintings of her from this period, there are examples in sculptures by Henri-Joseph Ruxthiel (1819), John Gibson (1856), Pierre Loison (1861, see above) and Chauncy Bradley Ives (1871).

== Pandora's relationship to Eve ==
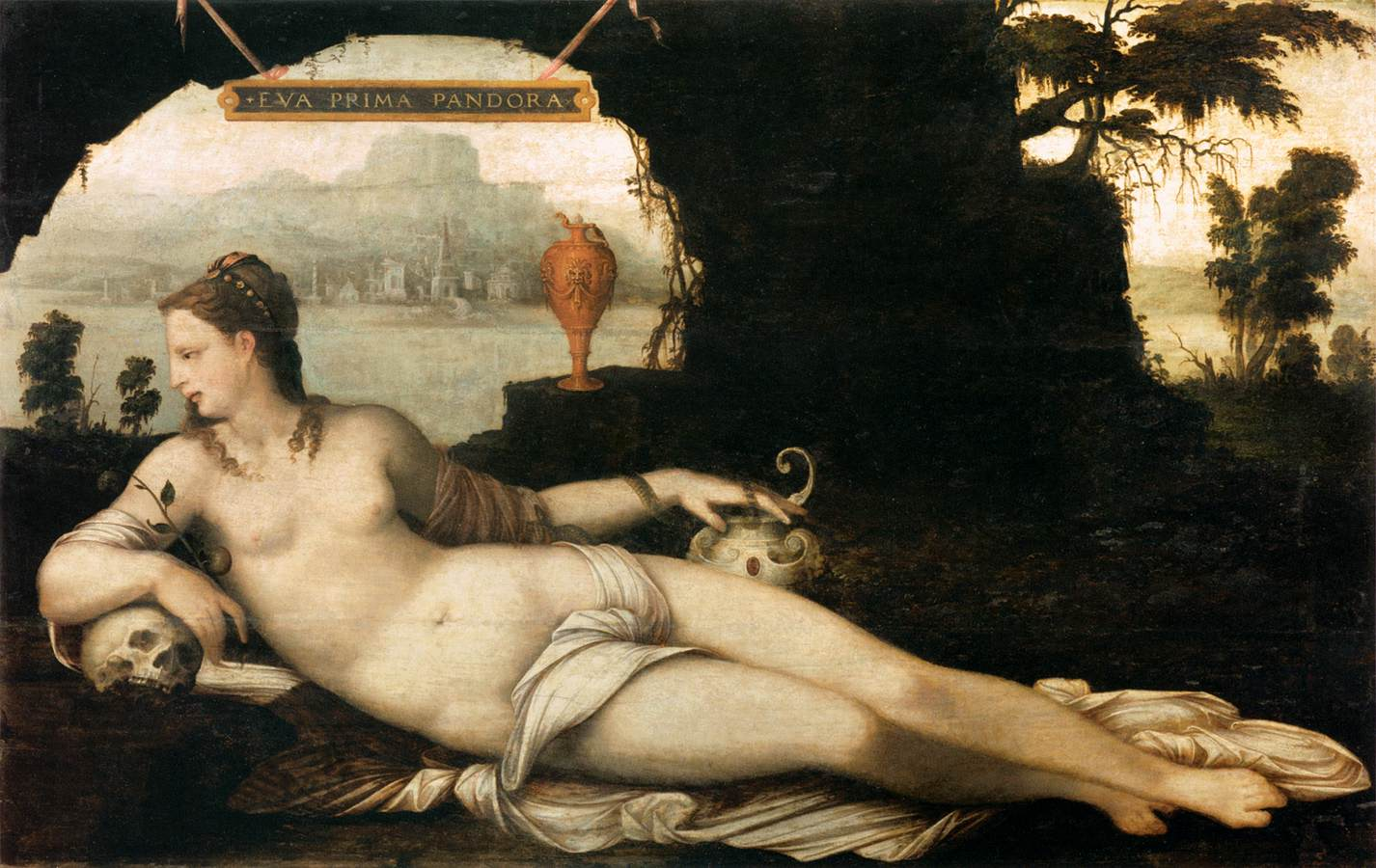
Jean Cousin, painting on panel, Eva Prima Pandora (Eve the first Pandora), 1550

There is an additional reason why Pandora should appear nude, in that it was a theological commonplace going back to the early Church Fathers that the Classical myth of Pandora made her a type of Eve. Each is the first woman in the world; and each is a central character in a story of transition from an original state of plenty and ease to one of suffering and death, a transition which is brought about as a punishment for transgression of divine law.

It has been argued that it was as a result of the Hellenisation of Western Asia that the misogyny in Hesiod's account of Pandora began openly to influence both Jewish and then Christian interpretations of scripture. The doctrinal bias against women so initiated then continued into the Renaissance. Bishop Jean Olivier's long Latin poem Pandora drew on the Classical account as well as the Biblical to demonstrate that woman is the means of drawing men to sin. Originally appearing in 1541 and republished thereafter, it was soon followed by two separate French translations in 1542 and 1548. At the same period appeared a 5-act tragedy by the Protestant theologian Leonhard Culmann (1498-1568) titled Ein schön weltlich Spiel von der schönen Pandora (1544), similarly drawing on Hesiod in order to teach conventional Christian morality.

The equation of the two also occurs in the 1550 allegorical painting by Jean Cousin the Elder, Eva Prima Pandora (Eve the first Pandora), in which a naked woman reclines in a grotto. Her right elbow rests on a skull, indicating the bringing of death, and she holds an apple branch in that hand – both attributes of Eve. Her left arm is wreathed by a snake (another reference to the temptation of Eve) and that hand rests on an unstopped jar, Pandora's attribute. Above hangs the sign from which the painting gains its name and beneath it is a closed jar, perhaps the counterpart of the other in Olympus, containing blessings.

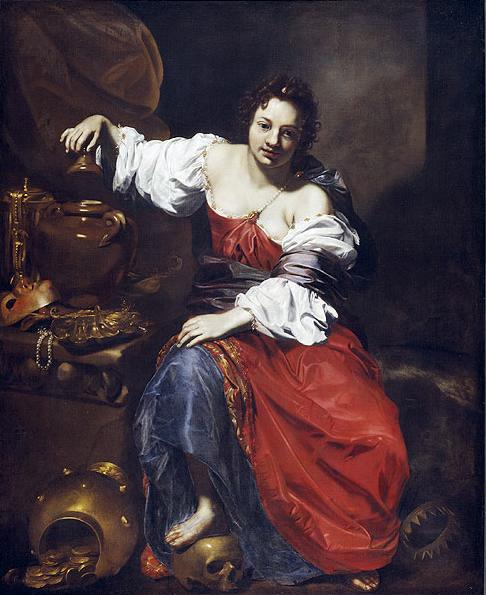
Nicolas Régnier: Allegory of Vanity—Pandora, c. 1626

In Juan de Horozco's Spanish emblem book, Emblemas morales (1589), a motive is given for Pandora's action. Accompanying an illustration of her opening the lid of an urn from which demons and angels emerge is a commentary that condemns "female curiosity and the desire to learn by which the very first woman was deceived". In the succeeding century that desire to learn was equated with the female demand to share the male prerogative of education. In Nicolas Regnier's painting "The Allegory of Vanity" (1626), subtitled "Pandora", it is typified by her curiosity about the contents of the urn that she has just unstopped and is compared to the other attributes of vanity surrounding her (fine clothes, jewellery, a pot of gold coins). Again, Pietro Paolini's lively Pandora of about 1632 seems more aware of the effect that her pearls and fashionable headgear is making than of the evils escaping from the jar she holds. There is a social message carried by these paintings too, for education, no less than expensive adornment, is only available to those who can afford it.

But an alternative interpretation of Pandora's curiosity makes it merely an extension of childish innocence. This comes out in portrayals of Pandora as a young girl, as in Walter Crane's "Little Pandora" spilling buttons while encumbered by the doll she is carrying, in Arthur Rackham's book illustration and Frederick Stuart Church's etching of an adolescent girl taken aback by the contents of the ornamental box she has opened. The same innocence informs Odilon Redon's 1910/12 clothed figure carrying a box and merging into a landscape suffused with light, and even more the 1914 version of a naked Pandora surrounded by flowers, a primaeval Eve in the Garden of Eden. Such innocence, "naked and without alarm" in the words of an earlier French poet, portrays Pandora more as victim of a conflict outside her comprehension than as temptress.

=== Between Eve and Pygmalion ===
Early dramatic treatments of the story of Pandora are works of musical theatre. La Estatua de Prometeo (1670) by Pedro Calderón de la Barca is made an allegory in which devotion to learning is contrasted with the active life. Prometheus moulds a clay statue of Minerva, the goddess of wisdom to whom he is devoted, and gives it life from a stolen sunbeam. This initiates a debate among the gods whether a creation outside their own work is justified; his devotion is in the end rewarded with permission to marry his statue. In this work, Pandora, the statue in question, plays only a passive role in the competition between Prometheus and his brother Epimetheus (signifying the active life), and between the gods and men.

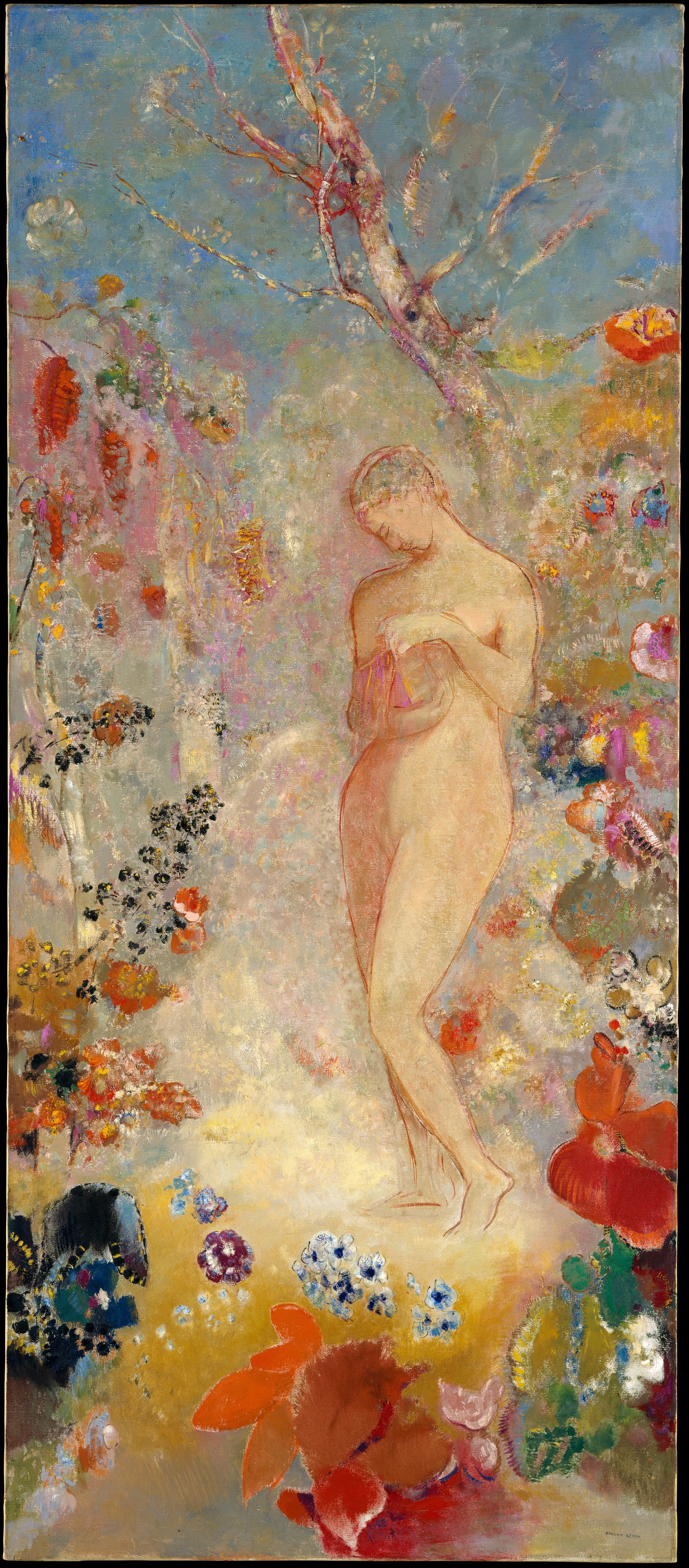
Pandora, Odilon Redon's c. 1914 oil painting depicting Pandora as an innocent Eve

Another point to note about Calderón's musical drama is that the theme of a statue married by her creator is more suggestive of the story of Pygmalion. The latter is also typical of Voltaire's ultimately unproduced opera Pandore (1740). There too the creator of a statue animates it with stolen fire, but then the plot is complicated when Jupiter also falls in love with this new creation but is prevented by Destiny from consummating it. In revenge the god sends Destiny to tempt this new Eve into opening a box full of curses as a punishment for Earth's revolt against Heaven.

If Pandora appears suspended between the roles of Eve and of Pygmalion's creation in Voltaire's work, in Charles-Pierre Colardeau's erotic poem Les Hommes de Prométhée (1774) she is presented equally as a love-object and in addition as an unfallen Eve:

Not ever had the painter's jealous veil
Shrouded the fair Pandora's charms:
Innocence was naked and without alarm.

Having been fashioned from clay and given the quality of "naïve grace combined with feeling", she is set to wander through an enchanted landscape. There she encounters the first man, the prior creation of Prometheus, and warmly responds to his embrace. At the end the couple quit their marriage couch and survey their surroundings "As sovereigns of the world, kings of the universe".

One other musical work with much the same theme was Aumale de Corsenville's one-act verse melodrama Pandore, which had an overture and incidental music by Franz Ignaz Beck. There Prometheus, having already stolen fire from heaven, creates a perfect female, "artless in nature, of limpid innocence", for which he anticipates divine vengeance. However, his patron Minerva descends to announce that the gods have gifted Pandora with other qualities and that she will become the future model and mother of humanity. The work was performed on 2 July 1789, on the very eve of the French Revolution, and was soon forgotten in the course of the events that followed.

== 19th century drama ==
Over the course of the 19th century, the story of Pandora was interpreted in radically different ways by four dramatic authors in four countries. In two of these she was presented as the bride of Epimetheus; in the two others she was the wife of Prometheus. The earliest of these works was the lyrical dramatic fragment by Johann Wolfgang von Goethe, written between 1807 and 1808. Though it bears the title Pandora, what exists of the play revolves round Epimetheus' longing for the return of the wife who has abandoned him and has yet to arrive. A biographer has argued that it is a philosophical transformation of Goethe's passion in old age for a teenaged girl.

Henry Wadsworth Longfellow's The Masque of Pandora dates from 1876. It begins with her creation, her refusal by Prometheus and acceptance by Epimetheus. Then in the latter's house an "oaken chest, Carven with figures and embossed with gold" attracts her curiosity. After she eventually gives in to temptation and opens it, she collapses in despair and a storm destroys the garden outside. When Epimetheus returns, she begs him to kill her but he accepts joint responsibility. The work was twice used as the basis for operas by Alfred Cellier in 1881 and by Eleanor Everest Freer in 1933. Iconographical elements from the masque also figure in Walter Crane's large watercolour of Pandora of 1885. She is pictured as sprawled over a carved wooden chest on which are embossed golden designs of the three fates who figure as a chorus in Longfellow's scene 3. Outside the palace, a high wind is bending the trees. But on the front of the chest, a medallion showing the serpent wound about the tree of knowledge recalls the old interpretation of Pandora as a type of Eve.

In England the high drama of the incident was travestied in James Robinson Planché's Olympic Revels or Prometheus and Pandora (1831), the first of the Victorian burlesques. It is a costume drama peppered with comic banter and songs during which the gods betroth Pandora to a disappointed Prometheus with "only one little box" for dowry. When she opens it, Jupiter descends to curse her and Prometheus, but Hope emerges from the box and negotiates their pardon.

At the other end of the century, Gabriel Fauré's ambitious opera Prométhée (1900) had a cast of hundreds, a huge orchestra and an outdoor amphitheatre for stage. It was based in part on the Prometheus Bound of Aeschylus but was rewritten so as to give the character of Pandore an equal part with his. This necessitated her falling "as if dead" on hearing the judgement against Prométhée in Act 1; a funeral procession bearing her body at the start of Act 2, after which she revives to mourn the carrying out of Prométhée's sentence; while in Act 3 she disobeys Prométhée by accepting a box, supposedly filled with blessings for mankind, and makes the tragedy complete.

=== Pandora in character ===
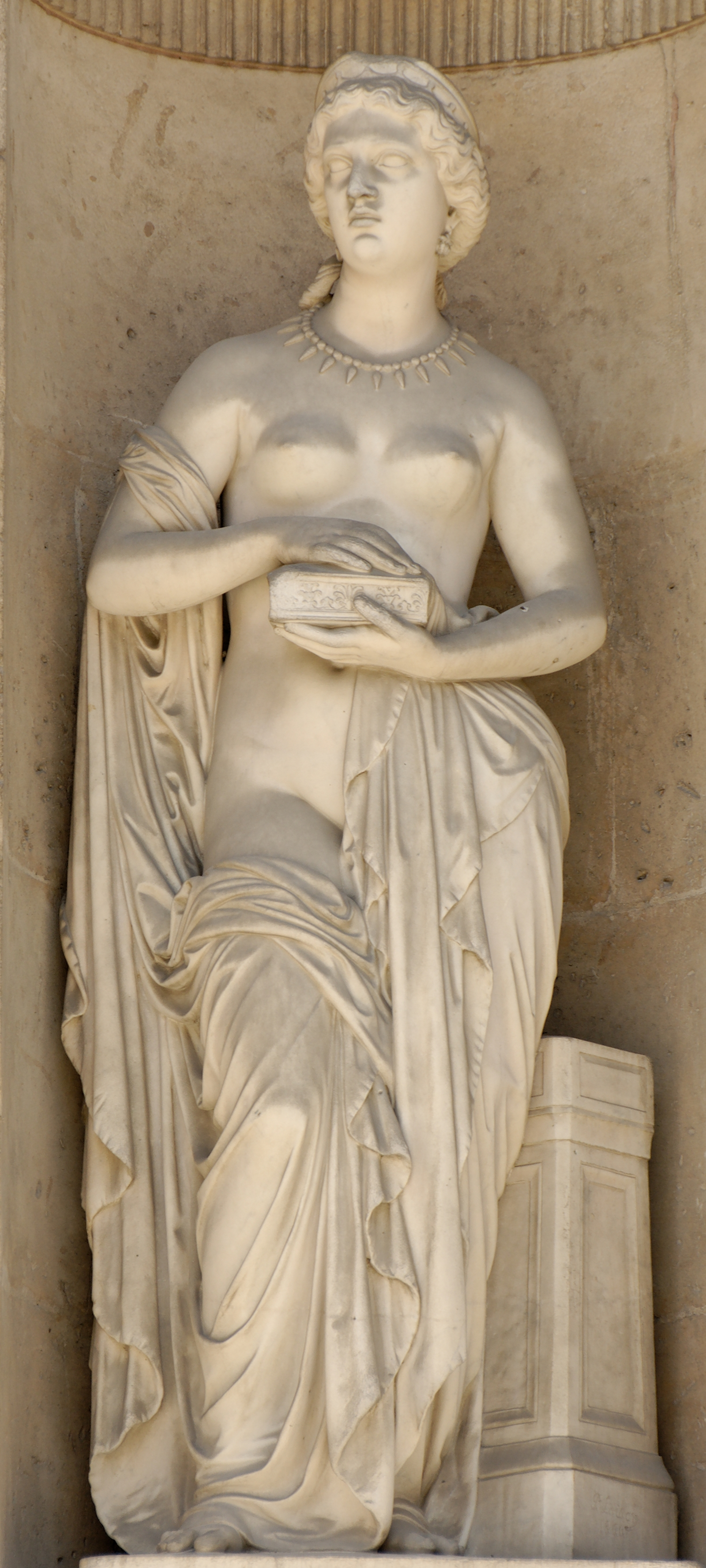
Pandora (1861) by Pierre Loison (1816–1886)

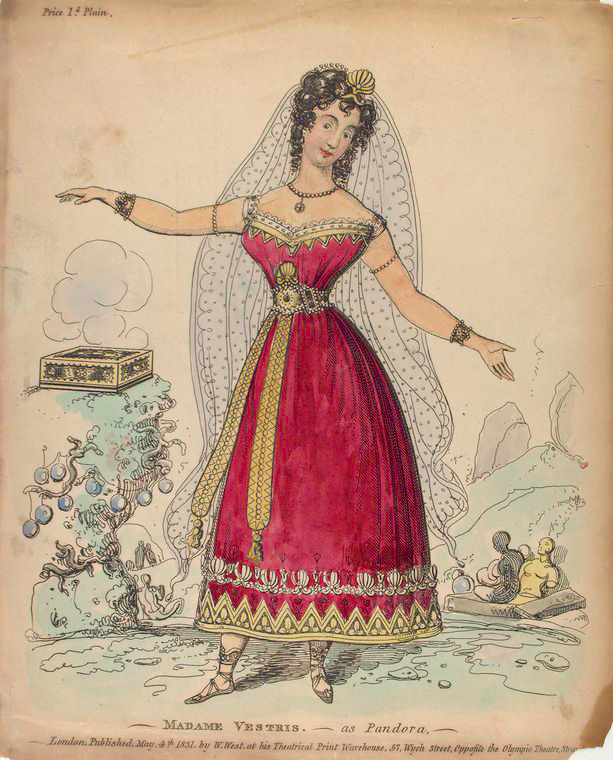
Madame Vestris in the burlesque Prometheus and Pandora, an 1831 print

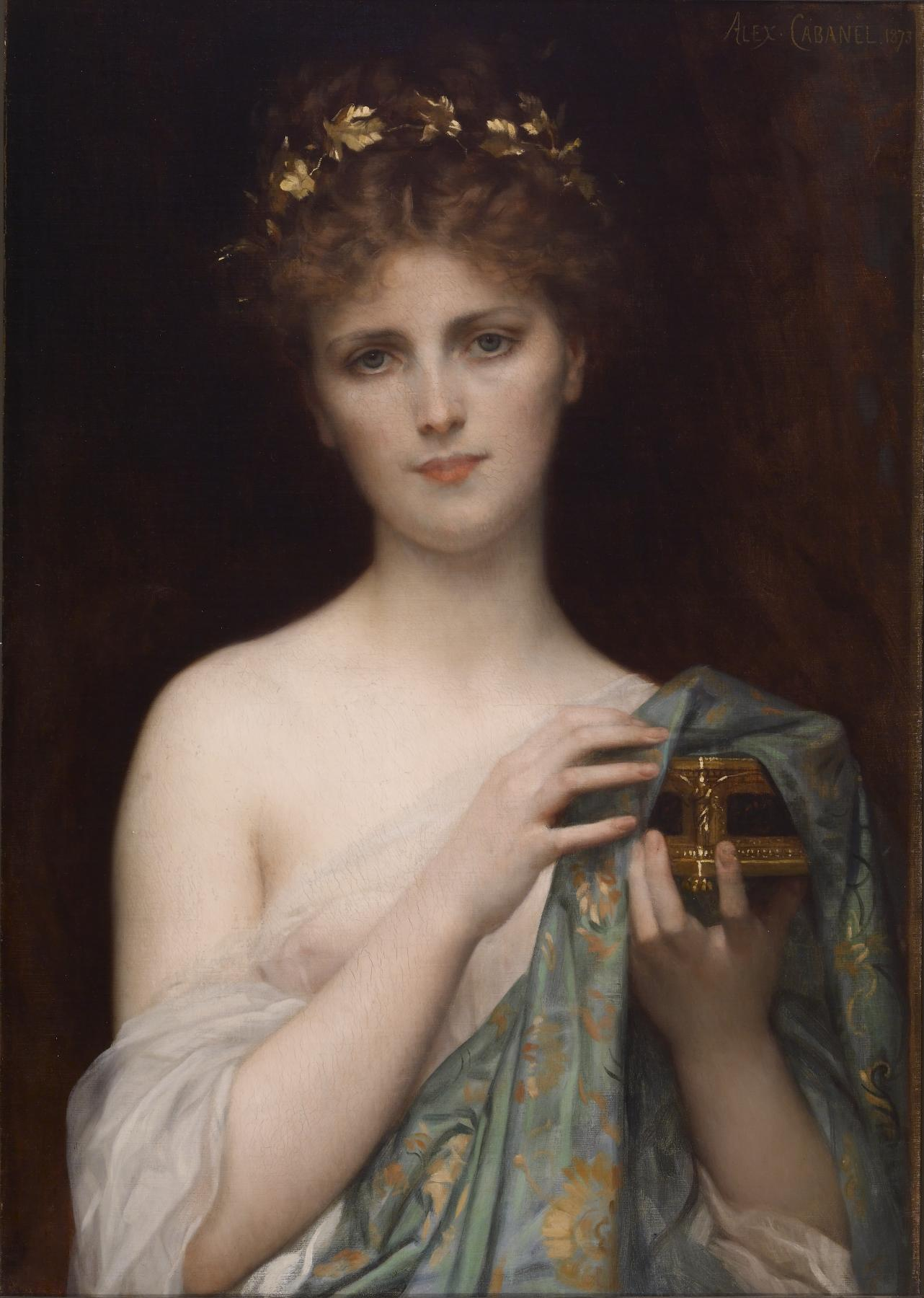
Swedish soprano Christine Nilsson as Pandora by Alexandre Cabanel, 1873

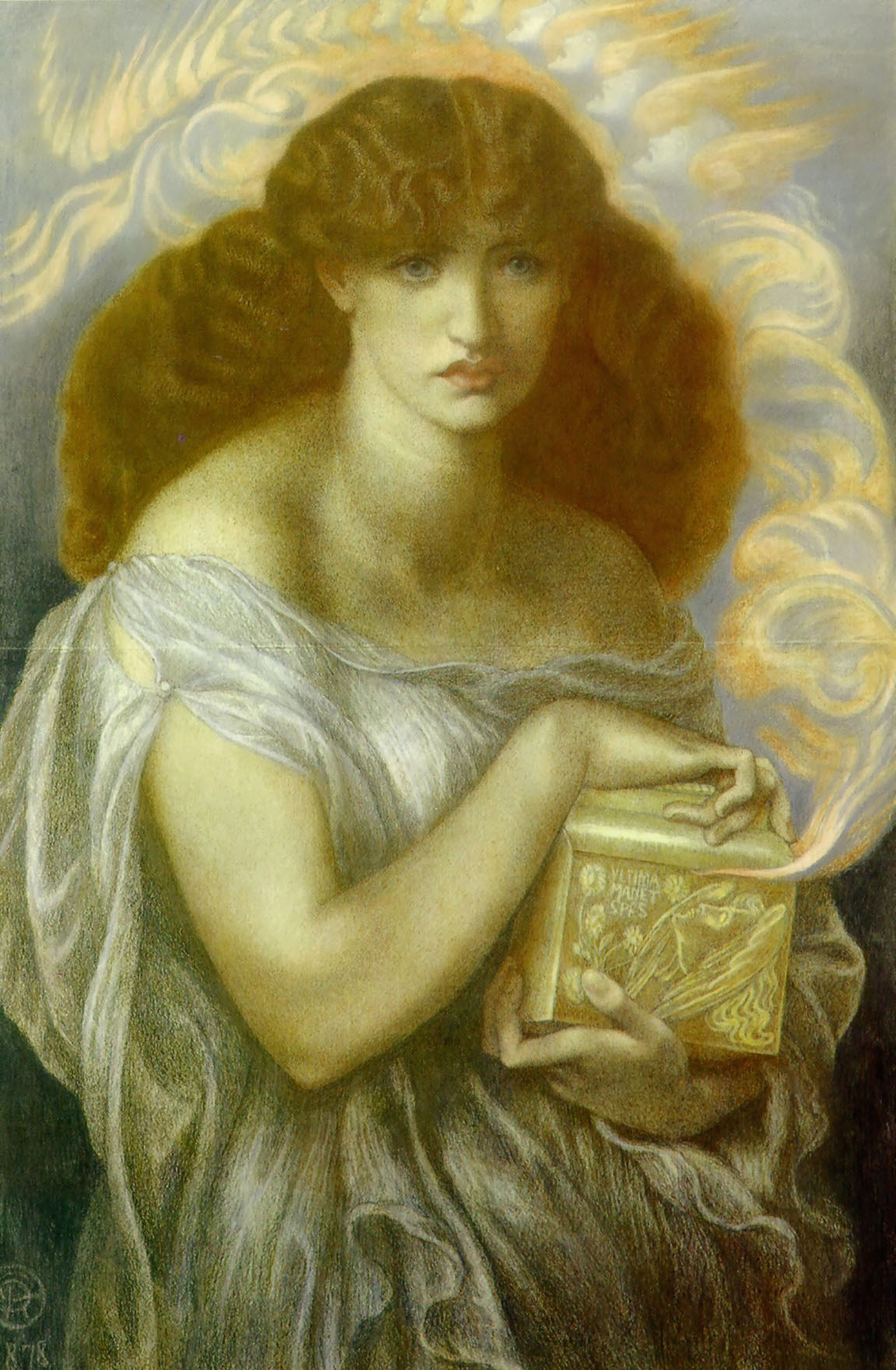
Jane Morris in the role, Dante Gabriel Rossetti, coloured chalks, 1879

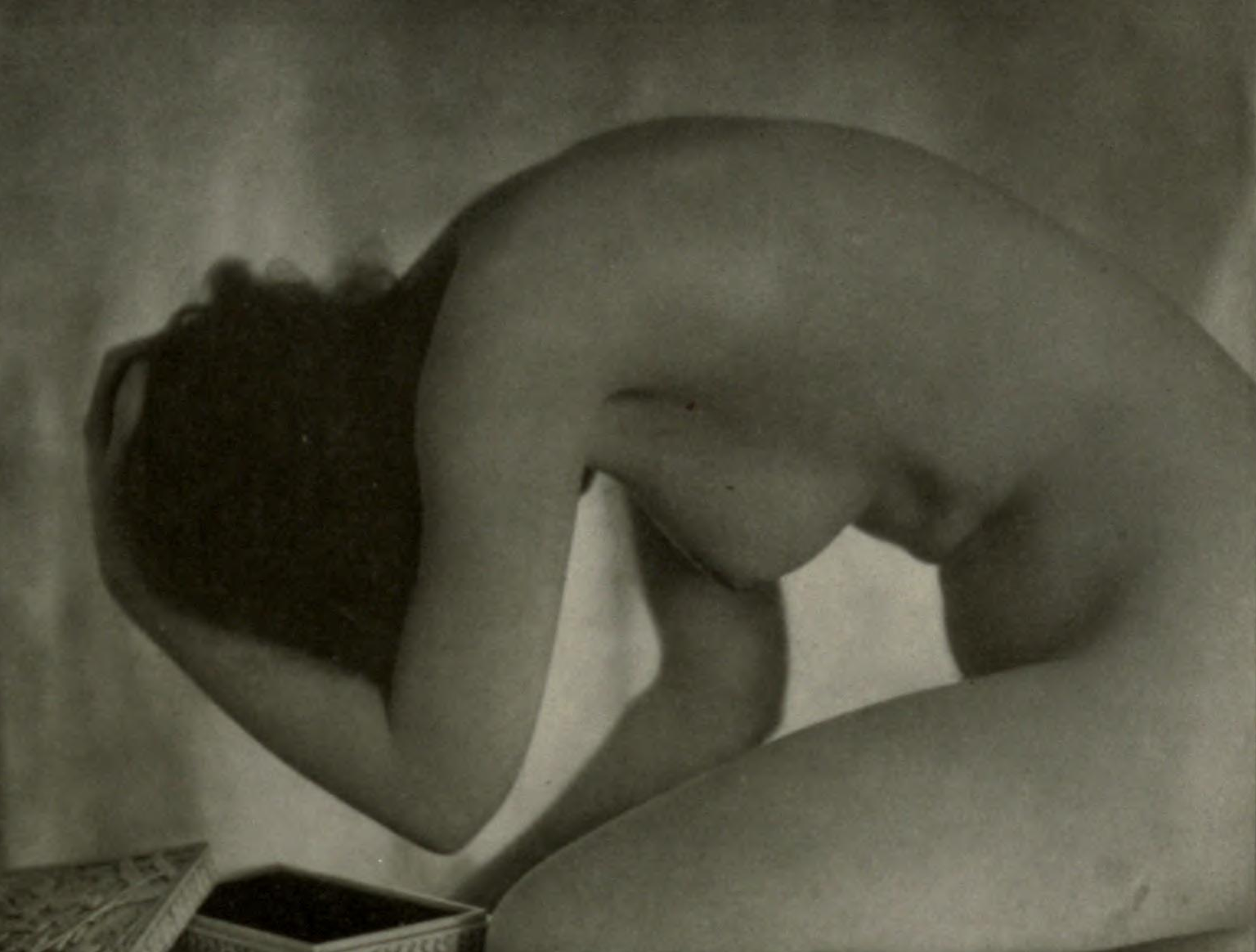
Yvonne Gregory's photogram recreates a pose from a painting, 1919

The pattern during the 19th century had only repeated that of the nearly three millennia before it. The ancient myth of Pandora never settled into one accepted version, was never agreed to have a single interpretation. It was used as a vehicle to illustrate the prevailing ideologies or artistic fashions of the time and eventually became so worn a coinage that it grew confused with other, sometimes later, stories. Best known in the end for a single metaphorical attribute, the container with which she was not even endowed until the 16th century, depictions of Pandora have been further confused with other holders of receptacles – with one of the trials of Psyche, with Sophonisba about to drink poison or Artemisia with the ashes of her husband. Nevertheless, her very polyvalence has been in the end the guarantor of her cultural survival.

== General and cited references ==
- Athanassakis, A. Hesiod: Theogony, Works and Days, Shield (New York 1983).
- Beall, E. "The Contents of Hesiod's Pandora Jar: Erga 94–98," Hermes 117 (1989) 227–30.
- Fontenrose, Joseph, "Work, Justice, and Hesiod's Five Ages", in Classical Philology, Vol. 69, No. 1, pp. 1–16, 1974. JSTOR 268960.
- Griffith, Mark. Aeschylus Prometheus Bound Text and Commentary (Cambridge 1983).
- Harrison, Jane Ellen, Prolegomena to the Study of Greek Religion (1903) 1922, pp. 280–85.
- Hesiod, Theogony, in The Homeric Hymns and Homerica with an English Translation by Hugh G. Evelyn-White, Cambridge, Massachusetts, Harvard University Press; London, William Heinemann Ltd. 1914. Online version at the Perseus Digital Library.
- Hesiod, Works and Days, in The Homeric Hymns and Homerica with an English Translation by Hugh G. Evelyn-White, Cambridge, Massachusetts, Harvard University Press; London, William Heinemann Ltd. 1914. Online version at the Perseus Digital Library.
- Homer, The Iliad with an English Translation by A.T. Murray, Ph.D. in two volumes. Cambridge, MA., Harvard University Press; London, William Heinemann, Ltd. 1924. Online version at the Perseus Digital Library.
- Patrick Kaplanian, Mythes grecs d'Origine, volume I, Prométhée et Pandore, Ed. L'entreligne, Paris 2011, distribution Daudin
- Kenaan, Pandora's Senses: The Feminine Character of the Ancient Text (Madison, WI: The University of Wisconsin Press, 2008), pp. xii, 253 (Wisconsin Studies in Classics).
- Kirk, G.S., Myth: Its Meaning and Functions in Ancient and Other Cultures (Berkeley 1970) 226–32.
- Lamberton, Robert, Hesiod, New Haven: Yale University Press, 1988. ISBN 0-300-04068-7. Cf. Chapter II, "The Theogony", and Chapter III, "The Works and Days", especially pp. 96–103 for a side-by-side comparison and analysis of the Pandora story.
- Leinieks, V. "Elpis in Hesiod, Works and Days 96," Philologus 128 (1984) 1–8.
- Meagher, Robert E.; The Meaning of Helen: in Search of an Ancient Icon, Bolchazy-Carducci Publishers, 1995. ISBN 978-0-86516-510-6.
- Moore, Clifford H. The Religious Thought of the Greeks, 1916.
- Most, G. W., Hesiod, Theogony, Works and Days, Testimonia, Loeb Classical Library No. 57, Cambridge, Massachusetts, Harvard University Press, 2018. ISBN 978-0-674-99720-2. Harvard University Press.
- Neils, Jenifer, The Girl in the Pithos: Hesiod's Elpis, in "Periklean Athens and its Legacy. Problems and Perspectives", eds. J. M. Barringer and J. M. Hurwit (Austin : University of Texas Press), 2005, pp. 37–45.
- Nelson, Stephanie A., God and the Land: The Metaphysics of Farming in Hesiod and Virgil, New York and Oxford, Oxford University Press, 1998. ISBN 0195117409.
- Nilsson, Martin P. History of Greek Religion, 1949.
- Panofsky, Dora and Erwin, Pandoras Box - The Changing Aspects of a Mythical Symbol, Bollingen Series 52, New York 1956
- Phipps, William E., Eve and Pandora Contrasted, in Theology Today, v.45, n.1, April 1988, pp. 34–48; Princeton: Princeton Theological Seminary.
- Pucci, Pietro, Hesiod and the Language of Poetry (Baltimore 1977)
- Rose, Herbert Jennings, A Handbook of Greek Literature; From Homer to the Age of Lucian, London, Methuen & Co., Ltd., 1934. Cf. especially Chapter III, Hesiod and the Hesiodic Schools, p. 61
- Schlegel, Catherine and Henry Weinfield, "Introduction to Hesiod" in Hesiod / Theogony and Works and Days, University of Michigan Press, 2006. ISBN 978-0-472-06932-3.
- Smith, William; Dictionary of Greek and Roman Biography and Mythology, London (1873). "Pando'ra"
- Smith, William; Dictionary of Greek and Roman Biography and Mythology, London (1873). "Anesido'ra"
- Van Noorden, Helen, Playing Hesiod: The 'Myth of the Races' in Classical Antiquity, Cambridge, Cambridge University Press, 2015. ISBN 9780521760812.
- Verdenius, Willem Jacob, A Commentary on Hesiod Works and Days vv 1–382 (Leiden: E.J. Brill, 1985). ISBN 90-04-07465-1. This work has a very in-depth discussion and synthesis of the various theories and speculations about the Pandora story and the jar. Cf. p. 62 and onwards.
- Vernant, J. P., Myth and Society in Ancient Greece (New York 1990) 183–201.
- Vernant, J. P. "Le mythe prométhéen chez Hésiode", in Mythe et société en Grèce ancienne, Paris, Maspéro, 1974, pp. 177–194
- Warner, M., Monuments and Maidens: The Allegory of the Female Form (New York 1985) 213–40
- West, M. L. (1966), Hesiod: Theogony, Oxford University Press. ISBN 0-19-814169-6.
- West, M. L. (1978), Hesiod: Works and Days, Clarendon Press. ISBN 0-19-814005-3.
- Zarecki, Jonathan P., "Pandora and the Good Eris in Hesiod", Greek, Roman, and Byzantine Studies 47 (2007) 5–29
- Zeitlin, Froma. Playing the Other: Gender and Society in Classical Greek Literature (Princeton 1995).
