= Ronald J. Pestritto =

American academic (born 1968)

- Born: Ronald James Pestritto Jr. 1968 (age 57–58)
- Education: Claremont McKenna College (BA); Claremont Graduate University (PhD)
- Occupation: Academic
- Employer: Hillsdale College

Ronald James Pestritto Jr. (born 1968) is an American academic. He is the Graduate Dean and Professor of Politics at Hillsdale College, and the author of two books and the editor of five more.

== Early life and education ==
Ronald James Pestritto Jr. was born in 1968. He graduated from Claremont McKenna College with a bachelor of arts degree in government in 1990. In 1994, he completed a PhD in political science from the Claremont Graduate University. His doctoral thesis was Criminal punishment and American Republicanism.

== Career ==
Pestritto was an adjunct instructor at Azusa Pacific University from 1993 to 1995 and Woodbury University from 1993 to 1994. In the summer of 1995, Pestritto was a consultant with the California Assembly Office of Research, where he managed a research staff and published an analysis of a three-strikes law that California voters passed in 1994.

Pestritto was an assistant professor at Saint Vincent College from 1997 to 1999. He taught at the University of Dallas from 1999 to 2006, where he became a tenured associate professor in 2002. He joined Hillsdale College in 2006, and became a full professor in 2012. He has been the dean of the Graduate School since 2010, and he is also the Charles and Lucia Shipley chair in the American Constitution. Additionally, he is affiliated with the Claremont Institute, and he has published articles in its Claremont Review of Books.

Pestritto is the author of two books. His first book, Founding the Criminal Law: Punishment and Political Thought in the Origins of America, "is about penal reform and the philosophy of punishment as both were debated in postrevolutionary America." In a review for the American Political Science Review, Amy Bunger of Florida State University praised the book for its contextualization of ideas, and added that it could do with more historical examples and policy implementations on a state level. Reviewing it for The Annals of the American Academy of Political and Social Science, Jeffrey Reiman of American University was more critical, dismissing Pestritto's conclusion based on the work of Ramsey Clark and Karl Menninger as "out of date" by three decades. His second book, Woodrow Wilson and the Roots of Modern Liberalism, influenced television personality Glenn Beck.

Pestritto is also the editor of five books, three of which he co-edited with Thomas G. West, one of his colleagues at Hillsdale College.

Pestritto supported Donald Trump during the 2016 presidential election.

== Selected works ==
=== As an author ===
- Pestritto, Ronald J. (2000). Founding the Criminal Law: Punishment and Political Thought in the Origins of America. DeKalk, Illinois: Northern Illinois University Press. ISBN 9780875802602. OCLC 876117874.
- Pestritto, Ronald J. (2005). Woodrow Wilson and the Roots of Modern Liberalism. Lanham, Maryland: Rowman & Littlefield. ISBN 9780742515161. OCLC 469974956.
- Pestritto, Ronald J. (2021). America Transformed: The Rise and Legacy of American Progressivism. New York, New York: Encounter Books. ISBN 9781641771689. OCLC 1266384326.

=== As an editor ===
- Pestritto, Ronald J.; West, Thomas G. (2003). The American Founding and the Social Compact. Lanham, Maryland: Lexington Books. ISBN 9780739106648. OCLC 470208637.
- Pestritto, Ronald J., ed. (2005). Woodrow Wilson: The Essential Political Writings. Lanham, Maryland: Lexington Books. ISBN 9780739109458. OCLC 255229832.
- Pestritto, Ronald J.; West, Thomas G. (2005). Challenges to the American Founding: Slavery, Historicism, and Progressivism in the Nineteenth Century. Lanham, Maryland: Lexington Books. ISBN 9780739108710. OCLC 55738079.
- Pestritto, Ronald J.; West, Thomas G., eds. (2007). Modern America and the Legacy of the Founding. Lanham, Maryland: Lexington Books. ISBN 9780739114162. OCLC 69013423.
- Pestritto, Ronald J.; Atto, William, eds. (2008). American Progressivism: A Reader. Lanham, Maryland: Lexington Books. ISBN 9780739123034. OCLC 895382404.
