= Grace Starry West =

American classics scholar

- Grace Starry, from a 1966 newspaper.
- Born: October 5, 1946; Oklahoma City, Oklahoma
- Died: May 19, 2019 (aged 72); Hillsdale, Michigan
- Occupation: Classics scholar
- Spouse: Thomas G. West

Grace Starry West (October 5, 1946 – May 19, 2019) was an American classics scholar, best known as co-translator of a popular English edition of four texts on Socrates. She taught at the University of Dallas in Texas, and at Hillsdale College in Michigan.

== Early life and education ==
Grace Starry was born in Oklahoma City, Oklahoma, the daughter of McKinley Starry and Joy Champlin Starry. She graduated from high school in Carlsbad, New Mexico in 1964, and from Scripps College in 1968. She held a Fulbright Scholar appointment for research at Heidelberg University from 1972 to 1974. She completed her doctoral studies at the University of California, Los Angeles (UCLA) in 1975, with a dissertation titled Women in Vergil’s Aeneid.

== Career ==
West was a member of the classics faculty at the University of Dallas from 1975 to 2011, including a stint as department chair from 1997 to 2006. She wrote commentaries on classical texts, and with her husband published widely-assigned translations of texts by Plato and Aristophanes. She also wrote about classical references in Shakespeare. West was a member of the Society for Classical Studies, and a trustee of the Vergilian Society. She served a term as president of the Texas Classical Association, and founded the Metroplex Classical Association in Dallas. After 2011, she taught at Hillsdale College in Michigan.

== Publications ==
- Women in Vergil's Aeneid (1975)
- Four texts on Socrates : Plato's Euthyphro, Apology, and Crito, and Aristophanes' Clouds (translation, with Thomas G. West, 1984)
- Dion (commentary, 1985)
- Charmides (translation, with Thomas G. West, 1986)
- Pro Archia poeta oratio (translation, 1987)

== Personal life ==
Grace Starry married fellow classics scholar Thomas G. West in 1974. They had four children. West died from lung cancer in 2019, aged 72 years, at her home in Hillsdale, Michigan.
