= Thomas G. West =

American academic (born 1945)

- Born: 1945 (age 80–81)
- Education: Cornell University; Claremont Graduate University
- Occupation: Academic
- Employer: Hillsdale College

Thomas G. West (born 1945) is an American academic. He is a professor of politics at Hillsdale College in Hillsdale, Michigan and the author of three books.

== Early life and education ==
West was born in 1945. He received a B.A. degree from Cornell University in Ithaca, New York in 1967 and his Ph.D. degree from Claremont Graduate University in Claremont, California in 1974. He served in the Vietnam War in 1969-1970 as a lieutenant in the U.S. Army.

== Career ==
West taught at the University of Dallas in Irving, Texas from 1974 to 2011. Since 2011, he has been a professor of politics at Hillsdale College. He was a Bradley Resident Scholar at The Heritage Foundation from 1988 to 1989, and a Salvatori Visiting Scholar at Claremont McKenna College in Claremont from 1990 to 1992. He is a director and senior fellow of the Claremont Institute, which has supported and publicized his research. He has translated, with Grace Starry West, Plato's Charmides, Euthyphro, Apology of Socrates, and Crito, as well as Aristophanes' Clouds. He also published Vindicating the Founders, an analysis and defense of American political thought in the founding of the United States in the 18th century.

West supported President Donald Trump during the 2016 presidential election.

== Selected works and appearances ==
=== Books ===
External videos
- Booknotes interview with West on Vindicating the Founders; November 2, 1997; C-SPAN

- The Political Theory of the American Founding: Natural Rights, Public Policy, and the Moral Conditions of Freedom (Cambridge University Press, 2017)
- Vindicating the Founders: Race, Sex, Class, and Justice in the Origins of America (Lanham, Maryland: Rowman and Littlefield, 1997; paperback edition, 2001)
- (author and translator) Plato's "Apology of Socrates": An Interpretation, with a New Translation (Ithaca, New York: Cornell University Press, 1979)

=== Edited volumes ===
- (co-edited with Ronald J. Pestritto) Modern America and the Legacy of the Founding (Lanham: Lexington Books, 2006)
- (co-edited with Ronald J. Pestritto) Challenges to the American Founding: Slavery, Historicism, and Progressivism in the Nineteenth Century (Lanham: Lexington Books, 2004)
- (co-edited with Ronald J. Pestritto) The American Founding and the Social Compact (Lanham: Lexington Books, 2003)
- (editor and introduction) Algernon Sidney, Discourses Concerning Government (Indianapolis: Liberty Classics, 1990; revised edition 1996)
- (co-edited with John E. Alvis) Shakespeare as Political Thinker (Durham, North Carolina: Carolina Academic Press, 1981; revised and expanded edition, Wilmington, Delaware: Intercollegiate Studies Institute Books, 2000)

=== Public appearances ===
- Does Our Constitution Still Matter? (panel discussion with Robert D. Cohen, Allen Fishburn, and Calvin C. Jillson)
- American Federalism in Theory and Practice (panelist, 2011 Constitution Day Celebration)
- Should Conservatives Today Accept the New Deal as a Done Deal? (panelist, 2012 Constitution Day Celebration)
- Locke and the Founders on Sex and Marriage (lecture at the University of Dallas)
