= Charmides =

5th-century BC Athenian politician

Charmides (/ˈkɑːrmɪdiːz/; Ancient Greek: Χαρμίδης), son of Glaucon (who was the grandfather of Plato, and not to be confused with his brother of the same name), born circa 446 BC, was an Athenian statesman. Charmides appears in the Platonic dialogue bearing his name (Charmides), the Protagoras, and the Symposium, as well as in Xenophon's Symposium, Memorabilia, and Hellenica. In the Charmides dialogue, he is asked the definition of the term "temperance", and when he cannot sufficiently provide one, this sets up the main plot of the dialogue, the search for the meaning of the term. A wealthy orphan raised by his first cousin, Critias, his property was confiscated for his role in profaning the Eleusinian Mysteries in 415 BC. He is commonly listed as one of the Thirty Tyrants who ruled Athens following its defeat in the Peloponnesian War, but evidence points only to his having been one of the ten men appointed by the Thirty to govern the Piraeus. He was killed in the Battle of Munichia in 403 BC when the democrats returned to Athens.

This Charmides was probably not the same man as the father of the great Athenian sculptor Phidias, also named Charmides.
