= Works and Days =

Didactic poem by Hesiod, c. 700 BC

- by Hesiod
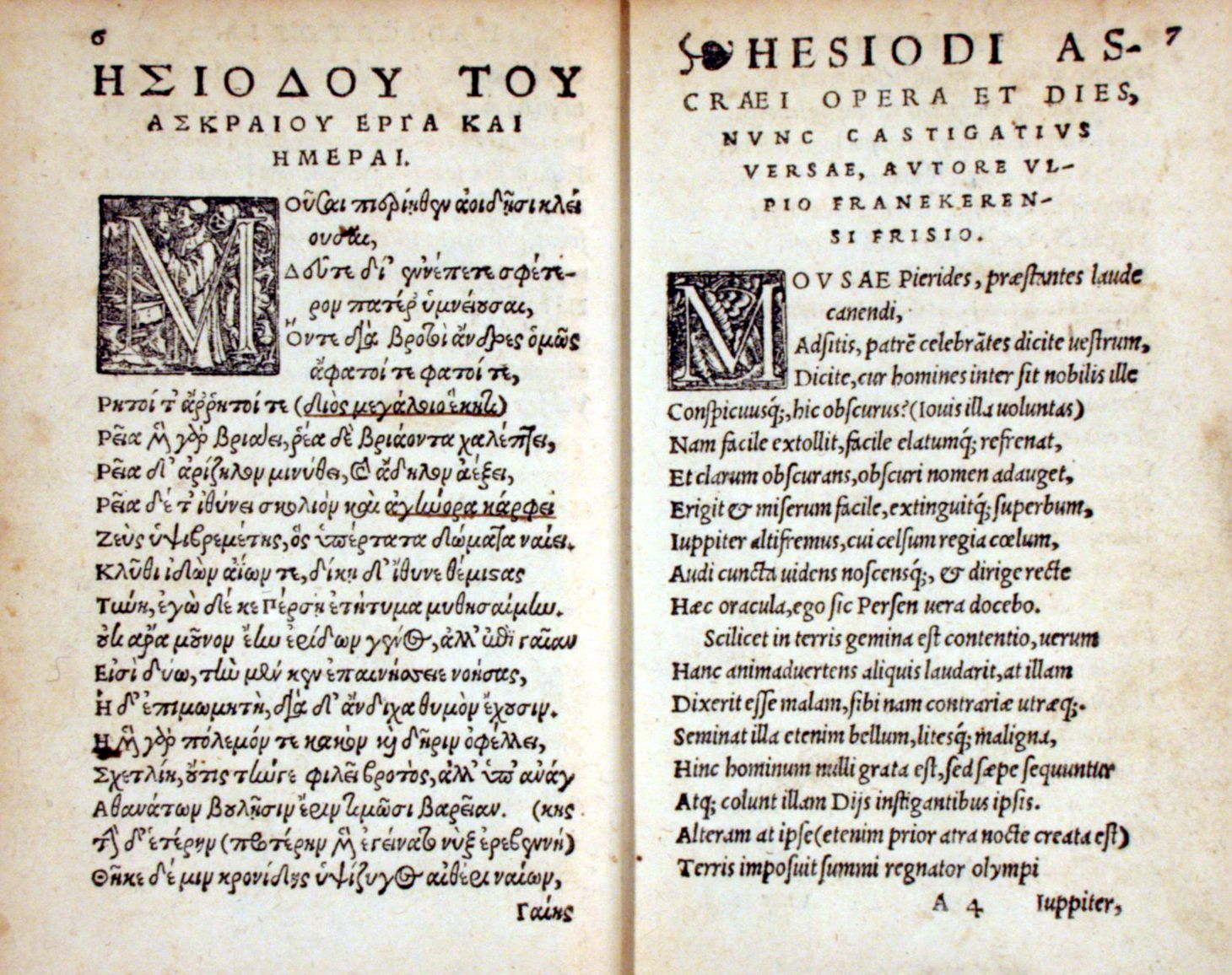
- An image from a 1539 printing of Works and Days
- Original title: Ἔργα καὶ Ἡμέραι
- Country: Aeolis
- Language: Ancient Greek
- Subject(s): Story of Prometheus and Pandora, and the so-called Myth of Five Ages
- Genre: Didactic poem
- Meter: dactylic hexameter
- Publication date: 700 BC
- Lines: 828

Full text
- Works and Days at Wikisource
- Έργα και ημέραι at Greek Wikisource

Works and Days (Ancient Greek: Ἔργα καὶ Ἡμέραι, romanized: Érga kaì Hēmérai) (Note: The Works and Days is sometimes called by the Latin translation of the title, Opera et Dies. Common abbreviations are WD and Op for Opera.) is a didactic poem written by ancient Greek poet Hesiod around 700 BC. It is in dactylic hexameter and contains 828 lines. At its center, the Works and Days is a farmer's almanac in which Hesiod instructs his brother Perses in the agricultural arts.

Scholars have seen this work against a background of agrarian crisis in mainland Greece, which inspired a wave of colonial expeditions in search of new land. In the poem, Hesiod also offers his brother extensive moralizing advice on how he should live his life. Works and Days is perhaps best known for its two mythological aetiologies for the toil and pain that define the human condition—the story of Prometheus and Pandora, and the so-called Myth of Five Ages.

== Synopsis ==
In Works and Days, Hesiod describes himself as the heir of a farm bequeathed to his brother Perses and him. Perses, though, apparently squandered his wealth and came back for what is owned by Hesiod. Perses went to the law and bribed the lords to judge in his favour. The poem contains a sharp attack against unjust judges like those who decided in favour of Perses; they are depicted as pocketing bribes as they render their unfair verdicts. Hesiod seems to have thought that instead of giving him money or property, which he will again spend in no time, teaching him the virtues of work and impart his wisdom, which can be used to generate an income, would be better.

Like the Theogony, Works and Days begins with a hymnic invocation to the Muses, albeit much shorter (10 lines to the Theogony's 115) and with a different focus. The poet invokes the "Pierian Muses" to sing of their father Zeus and his control of the fates of mankind. Through the power of Zeus, men might be famous or nameless; he easily strengthens the meek and oppresses the strong; reduces the conspicuous and raises up the inconspicuous; easily he straightens the crooked and withers the many. Hesiod then appeals to Zeus to guide his undertaking: "Hearken, seeing and hearing, and through justice put straight the laws; and may I speak the truth to Perses."

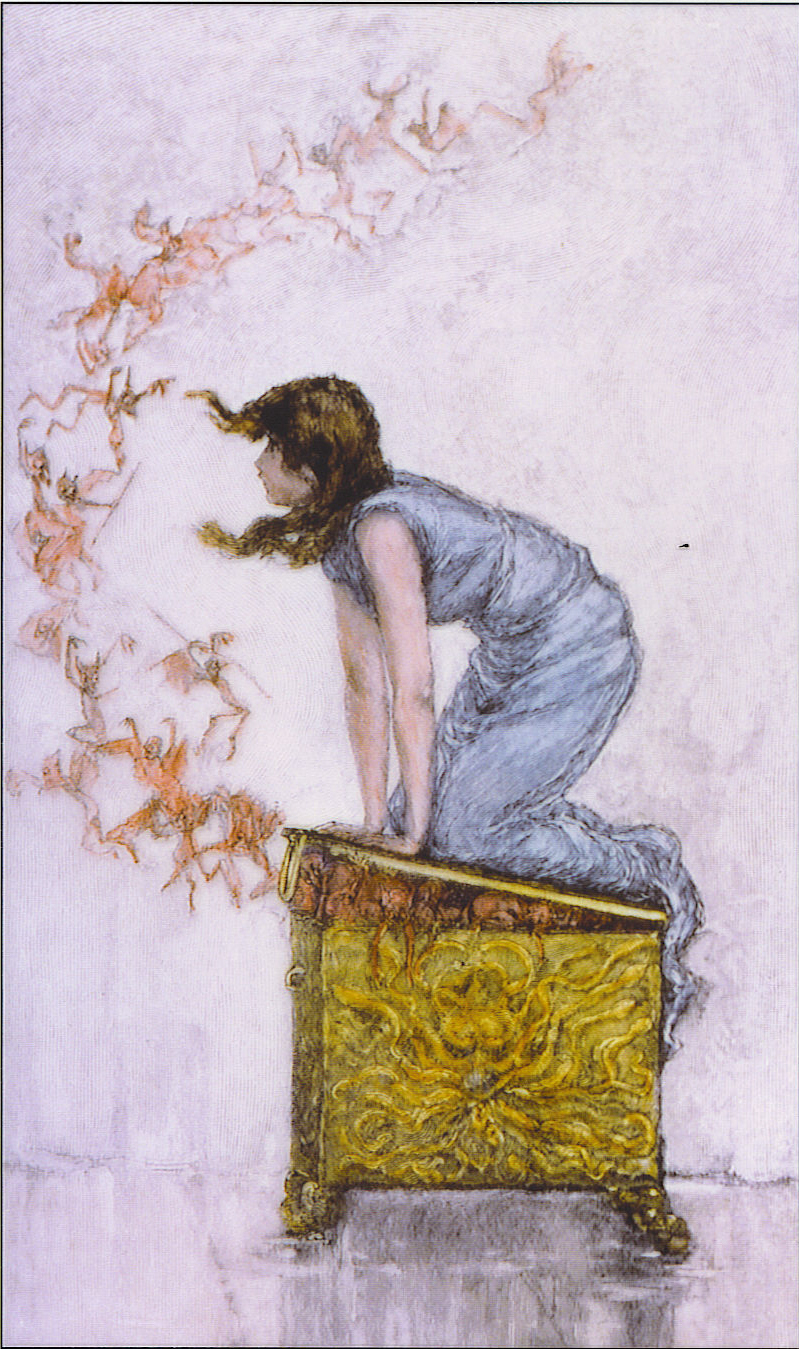
Engraving of the myth of Pandora based on a painting by F. S. Church

Hesiod begins the poem proper by directly engaging with the content of the Theogony. There was after all not one Eris (Ἔρις, "Strife"), as in that poem, but two: one is quite blameworthy and provokes wars and disagreement among mankind; but the other is commended by all who know her, for she compels men to work honorably, rivaling each other:

καὶ κεραμεὺς κεραμεῖ κοτέει καὶ τέκτονι τέκτων,
καὶ πτωχὸς πτωχῷ φθονέει καὶ ἀοιδὸς ἀοιδῷ.

Translation:

And potter is ill-disposed to potter, and carpenter to carpenter,
and the beggar is envious of the beggar, the singer of the singer.

Hesiod encourages Perses to avoid the bad Eris and not let her persuade him to frequent the arguments in the agora, but to focus on working for his livelihood. Family business follows, as Hesiod implores his brother to join him in sorting out their fraternal discord through the "justice of Zeus". It comes out that they had previously divided their patrimony, but that Perses claimed more than his fair share by influencing "bribe-devouring kings" (δωροφάγοι βασιλεῖς, dōrophagoi basileis).

The following few hundred verses—by far the most famous portion of the poem—comprise a series of mythological examples and gnomic statements outlining Hesiod's conception of justice and the necessity of work, with the ostensible goal of persuading Perses to follow a proper path in life. The first lesson is about why the immortals keep an easy livelihood hidden from mankind: the story of Prometheus and Pandora is the answer. In the Theogony, Pandora and the "tribe of women" had been sent as a plague upon man in punishment for Prometheus's attempt to deceive Zeus of his deserved portion when men and gods were dividing a feast, and for his subsequent theft of fire. In the Works and Days, Hesiod proceeds directly to the theft of fire and punishment. Zeus instructed the gods to build an "evil" for mankind: that is, Pandora, whom Prometheus's brother Epimetheus accepted from Hermes despite his brother's warnings never to accept gifts from the gods. Before Pandora's arrival, man had lived free from evils, toil and illness, but she had been given a jar which contained all these curses; this she opened, releasing all its contents but Elpis (Ἔλπις, "Hope" or "Expectation").

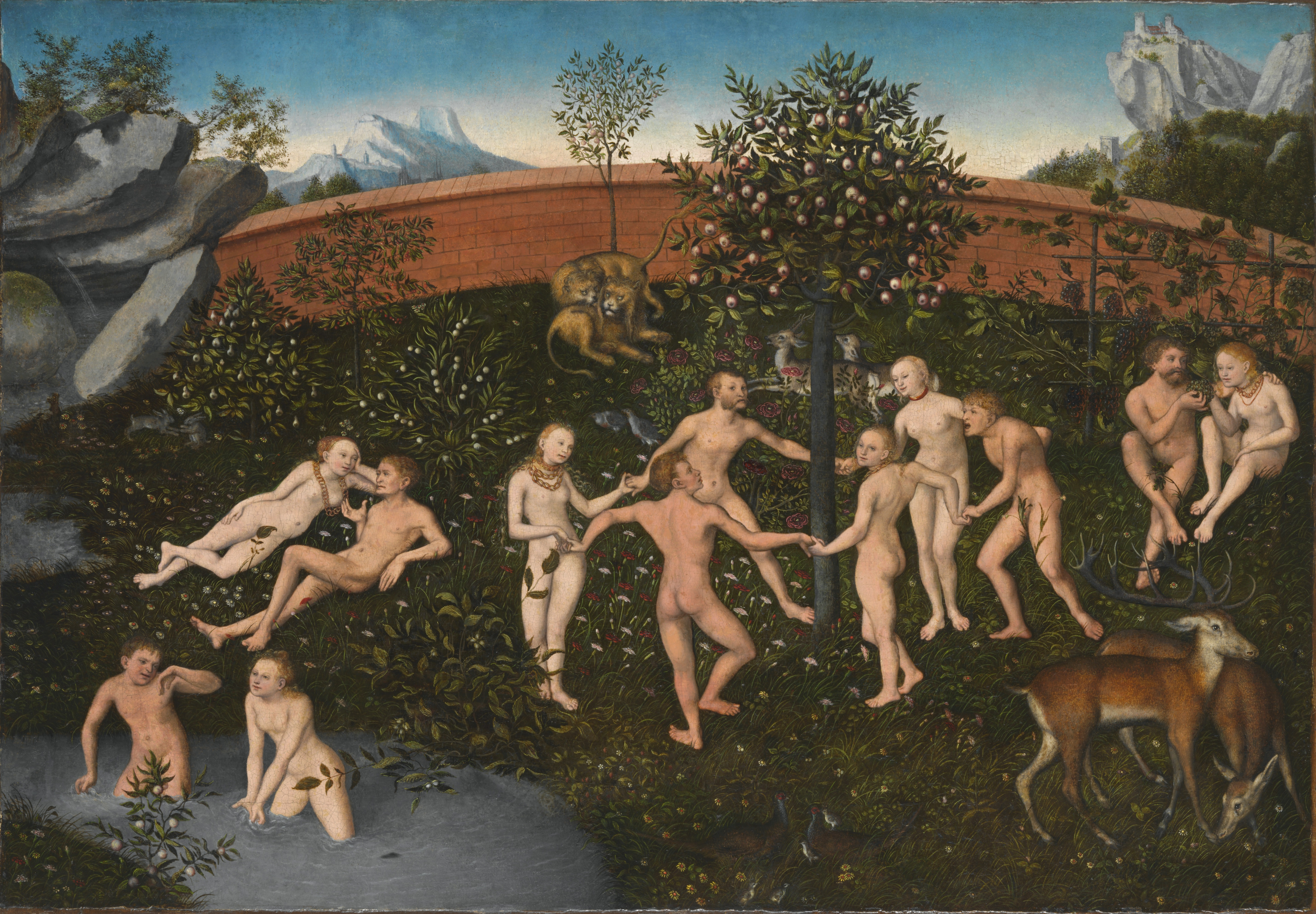
Lucas Cranach the Elder, The Golden Age (c. 1530)

The Myth of the Ages follows. In the Hesiodic scheme, there were five ages of mankind: the Golden Age, Silver Age, Bronze Age, Heroic Age, and the present age, that of Iron. The race of gold man lived in the time of Cronus, an age of plenty and peace, for the earth gave for all their needs of its own accord and rivalries of any kind were thus unknown. Men of the Golden Age never aged, and when they died they went as though to sleep. When this age came to an end, its population became guardians of mankind, protecting them from evils and granting them wealth. The Silver Age was much worse than the Golden, both in stature and temperament. People lived as children with their mothers for a hundred years. Once they came of age, they lived but a brief time, suffering because of their foolishness. They fought with one another and did not obey the gods. Angry at their impiety, Zeus destroyed the race; still, they are granted the honor of being called "chthonic blessed mortals". The Bronze Race was fearsome and warlike. Their weapons were bronze, they lived in bronze houses, and they wore bronze armor; black iron did not exist yet. They fell at each other's hands and came to an inglorious end. The race of heroes was more just and noble. Though demigods, they too fell in war, most notably those at Thebes and Troy. After death, they were transported to the Isles of the Blessed where they lived a postmortem life of plenty similar to the Golden Age. Hesiod then laments that he lives during the Iron Age, which is characterized by toil and hardship. He predicts that Zeus will destroy his race, too, when men are born gray-haired, and all moral and religious standards are ignored. Aidos and Nemesis will depart the earth, leaving behind ills against which there will be no bulwark.

The kings are now addressed, as Hesiod relates the fable of "The Hawk and the Nightingale" to them. A hawk flying high in the air had a nightingale in its talons. The smaller bird was shrieking and crying, to which the hawk responded:

δαιμονίη, τί λέληκας; ἔχει νύ σε πολλὸν ἀρείων·
τῇ δ᾽ εἶς ᾗ σ᾽ ἂν ἐγώ περ ἄγω καὶ ἀοιδὸν ἐοῦσαν·
δεῖπνον δ᾽, αἴ κ᾽ ἐθέλω, ποιήσομαι ἠὲ μεθήσω.
ἄφρων δ᾽, ὅς κ᾽ ἐθέλῃ πρὸς κρείσσονας ἀντιφερίζειν·
νίκης τε στέρεται πρός τ᾽ αἴσχεσιν ἄλγεα πάσχει.

Translation:

You fool, why do you scream? Someone much your better has you.
You go wherever I conduct you, songstress though you may be.
I shall make you my dinner, if I wish, or let you go.
Senseless is he who wishes to set himself against his betters:
he lacks victory and suffers grief upon grief.

The next section is composed largely of superstitions related to running a productive farm. There are also more general words of advice given for how to be successful, such as not putting off work for the next day. It gives instructions to tell slaves, indications on when is the right time to harvest certain plants, based in Greek Mythology, and examples of when to go sailing.

Traditional Customs follows, the verses including instruction on when one should marry, to avoid items containing “mischief” such as uncharmed pots, and other superstitions. The final section is about auspicious days of the month, telling what days will likely be prosperous and what days to avoid actions such as shearing, sowing, or procreating.

== Editions and translations ==
=== Critical editions ===
- Rzach, Aloisius (1908), Hesiodi Carmina (2nd rev. ed.), Leipzig. Link to text – Editio maior.
- Rzach, Aloisius (1913), Hesiodi Carmina (3rd rev. ed.), Leipzig, ISBN 3-598-71418-1. – Editio minor.
- Wilamowitz-Moellendorf, Ulrich von (1928), Hesiodos' Erga, Berlin. – With introduction and commentary (in German); omits the "Days".
- Sinclair, T. A. (1932), Hesiod, Works and Days, London. – With introduction and commentary.
- West, Martin Litchfield (1978), Hesiod: Works & Days, Oxford, ISBN 0-19-814005-3. – With introduction and commentary.
- Solmsen, Friedrich (1990), Hesiodi Theogonia, Opera et Dies, Scutum (3rd rev. ed.), Oxford, ISBN 0-19-814071-1. – 3rd edition of Solmsen's 1970 Oxford Classical Text.

=== Translations ===
- Chapman, George (1618). The Georgicks of Hesiod. (Reprinted as: Hesiod's Works and Days. London: Smith, 1888.) Metrical translation.
- Cooke, Thomas (1743). The Works of Hesiod. 2nd ed. London, 1743. (Reprinted in The British Poets in 100 Volumes. Vol. 88. London: Whittingham, 1822.) Metrical translation.
- Elton, Charles Abraham. The Remains of Hesiod. 2nd ed. London: Baldwin, 1815. Metrical translation.
- Evelyn-White, H. G. (1936), Hesiod, the Homeric Hymns, and Homerica, Loeb Classical Library (3rd rev. ed.), Cambridge, MA, ISBN 978-0-674-99063-0. Link to the full text of the 1914 first edition. – English translation with introduction and facing Greek text.
- Lattimore, Richmond. (1959). Hesiod: The Works and Days, Theogony, and The Shield of Herakles. Ann Arbor: The University of Michigan Press. ISBN 0-472-43903-0.
- Wender, Dorothy, (1976) Hesiod: Theogony /Works and Days, Theognis: Elegies, Penguin: London. With introduction by Dorothy Wender
- Athanassakis, A. (1983), Hesiod: Theogony, Works and days, Shield, Baltimore, ISBN 0-8018-2998-4. Link to text – With introduction and notes.
- Frazer, R. M. (1983), The Poems of Hesiod, Norman, Oklahoma, ISBN 0-8061-1837-7.
- Lombardo, S. (1993), Hesiod: Works & Days, Theogony, Indianapolis, ISBN 0-87220-179-1. – With introduction, notes and glossary by Robert Lamberton.
- Tandy, D. W.; Neale, W. C. (1996), Works and Days: a translation and commentary for the social sciences, Berkeley, ISBN 0-520-20383-6.
- Most, G. W. (2006), Hesiod: Theogony, Works and Days, Testimonia, Loeb Classical Library, Cambridge, MA, ISBN 978-0-674-99622-9. – English translation with introduction and facing Greek text.
- Schlegel, C. M.; Weinfield, H. (2006), Hesiod: Theogony and Works and Days, Ann Arbor, ISBN 978-0-472-06932-3. – With introduction and notes.
- Caldwell, R.; Nelson, S. (2006), Theogony & Works and Days, Indianapolis, ISBN 978-1-58510-288-4. – Introductions by the translators are also included, as is an essay by Caldwell entitled "The Psychology of the Succession Myth".
- Hine, Daryl (2008), Works of Hesiod and the Homeric Hymns, University of Chicago Press ISBN 978-0226329659. In dactylic hexameter with introduction, notes and index.
- Johnson, Kimberly (2017), Theogony and Works and Days: A New Bilingual Edition, Northwestern University Press, ISBN 081013487X.
- Stallings, A. E. (2018), Works and Days, Penguin, ISBN 0141197528. Verse translation with introduction, notes and index.

== Works cited ==
- Barron, J.P.; Easterling, P.E. (1985), "Hesiod", in P.E. Easterling; B.M.W. Knox (eds.), The Cambridge History of Classical Literature: Greek Literature, Cambridge, pp. 92–105, ISBN 978-0-521-21042-3.
- Bartlett, Robert C. "An Introduction to Hesiod's Works and Days", The Review of Politics 68 (2006), pp. 177–205, University of Notre Dame.
- Beall, E.F., What Pandora let out and what she left in, paper read at the annual meeting of the Classical Association of the Atlantic States, 6 October 2006
- Cingano, E. (2009), "The Hesiodic Corpus", in Montanari; Rengakos; Tsagalis (eds.), Brill's Companion to Hesiod, pp. 91–130.
- Clay, Jenny Strauss, Hesiod's Cosmos, Cambridge, 2003.
- Kenaan, Vered Lev, Pandora's Senses : The Feminine Character of the Ancient Text, Madison, Wisconsin, University of Wisconsin Press, 2008.
- Lamberton, Robert, Hesiod, New Haven : Yale University Press, 1988. ISBN 0-300-04068-7. Cf. Chapter III, The Works and Days, pp. 105–133.
- Montanari, F.; Rengakos, A.; Tsagalis, C. (2009), Brill's Companion to Hesiod, Leiden, ISBN 978-90-04-17840-3.
- Nelson, Stephanie A., God and the Land: The Metaphysics of Farming in Hesiod and Vergil, New York and Oxford, 1998
- Nisbet, Gideon, Hesiod, Works and Days: A Didaxis of Deconstruction?, Greece and Rome 51 (2004), pp. 147–63.
- Peabody, Berkley, The Winged Word: A Study in the Technique of Ancient Greek Oral Composition as Seen Principally Through Hesiod's Works and Days, State University of New York Press, 1975. ISBN 0-87395-059-3
- Sistakou, E. (2009), "Callimachus Hesiodicus Revisited", in Montanari; Rengakos; Tsagalis (eds.), Brill's Companion to Hesiod, pp. 219–52.
- Verdenius, Willem Jacob, A Commentary on Hesiod Works and Days vv. 1–382 (Leiden: E.J. Brill, 1985). ISBN 90-04-07465-1
