= Elpis (mythology) =

Greek mythological personification and spirit of hope

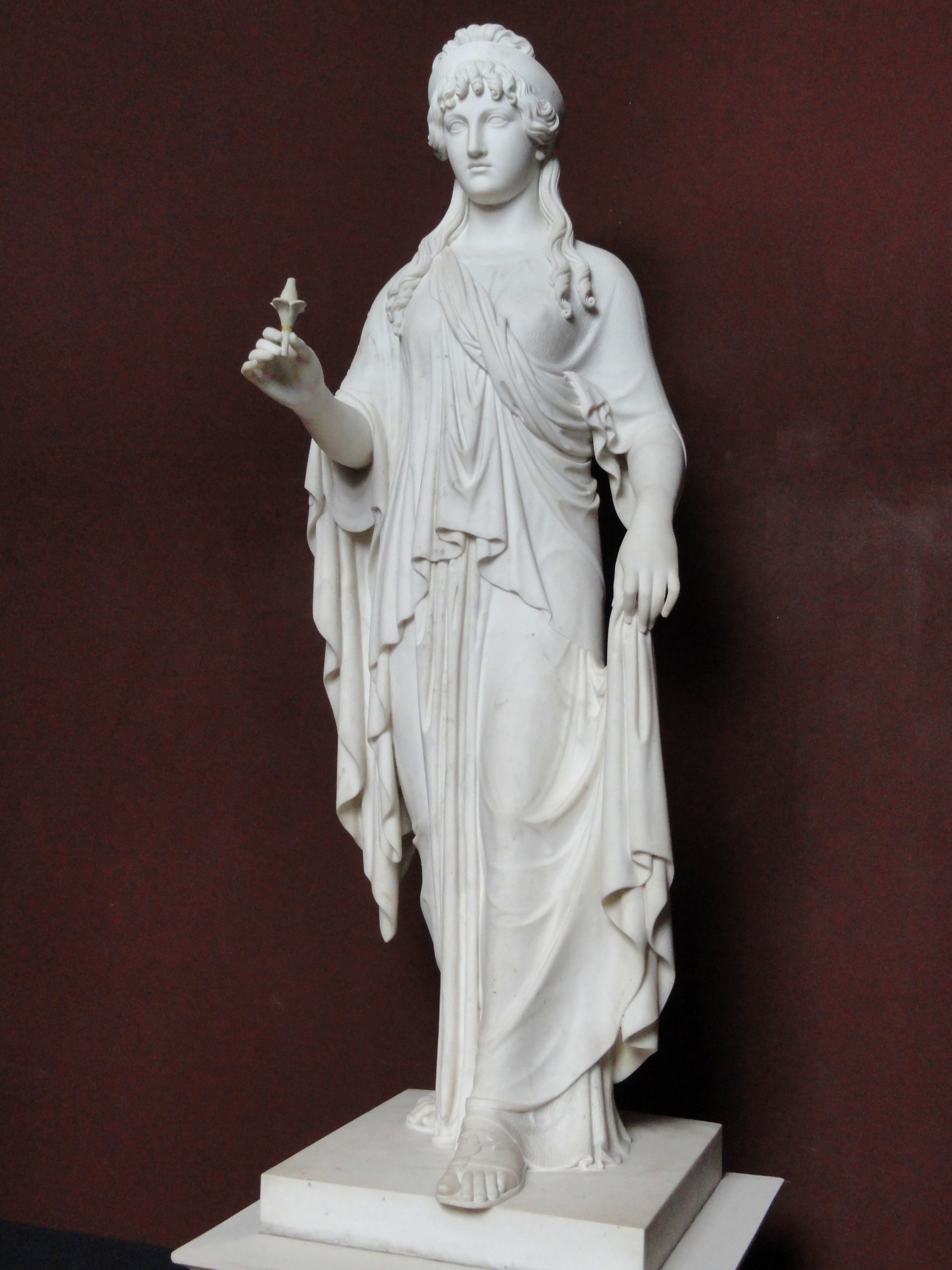
Bertel Thorvaldsen, Statue of Hope (1817), The Thorvaldsen Museum, Copenhagen

In Greek mythology, Elpis (Ancient Greek: Ἐλπίς, romanized: Elpis, lit. 'hope') is the minor goddess (daimon) of hope, about which the Greeks had ambivalent feelings. She was never the centre of a cult, as was Spes, her Roman equivalent, and was chiefly the subject of ambiguous Greek aetiological myths.

== Hesiod's Works and Days ==
Elpis was the remaining item enclosed in Pandora's box (or jar), the best known form of the myth found in Hesiod’s Works and Days. There Hesiod expands upon the misery inflicted on mankind through the curiosity of Pandora. She had brought with her as a wedding gift from heaven a storage jar (Note: A pithos is a very large jar, usually made of rough-grained terracotta, used for storage) but when this was opened it released a host of human ills before the lid could be secured again.

Only Hope was left within her unbreakable house,
she remained under the lip of the jar and did not
fly away. Before [she could], Pandora replaced the
lid of the jar. This was the will of aegis-bearing
Zeus the Cloudgatherer.

Based on Hesiod's description, there has been debate whether Elpis was only a delusive belief in good things to follow, or more generally expectation. According to the Classical commentator Willem Jacob Verdenius, the question hinges on whether the jar served to preserve elpis for man as a blessing, or was intended to keep men free of the curse of elpis. Was hope left to comfort man in his misery or was it the idle hope in which the lazy indulge when they should be working honestly for a living? In either case, "it is not possible to escape the mind of Zeus".

Where Hesiod's container was a prison of curses subsequently released on mankind, the poet Babrius preserved a later alternative Aesopic aetiology in which the jar contained blessings meant for mankind which then fled back to the heavenly realm. In this case Elpis is plainly seen as a divine gift now kept earth-bound.

As a consequence of this ambiguity, Greeks had ambivalent or even negative feelings about "hope". In his play The Suppliants, Euripides has a herald describe Elpis as "man's curse; many a state hath it involved in strife". In addition, the concept was unimportant in the philosophical systems of the Stoics and Epicureans. On the positive side, Pindar bestows on Elpis the adjective "sweet" (fragment 214) and Sophocles has a character in Oedipus Rex refer to "immortal Pheme (Report), child of golden Elpis".

== Spes ==
The Roman cult figure of Spes (Hope) - "good hope" as she was often addressed - is very different. On coinage and in statues, she is depicted as a young maiden in archaic dress with a flower offered in her right hand and holding up the hem of her skirt in the left.
