= Willem Jacob Verdenius =

Dutch classicist

Willem Jacob Verdenius (3 April 1913 – 23 June 1998) was a Dutch classicist.

== Life ==
Born at The Hague on 3 April 1913, he completed his PhD thesis on Parmenides at Utrecht University in 1942. He became Professor of Greek language and literature at Utrecht University in 1947. In 1965 he became member of the Royal Netherlands Academy of Arts and Sciences. He died at Zeist on 23 June 1998.

== Works ==
- Parmenides; some comments on his poem, 1942.
- (with Jan Hendrik Waszink) Aristotle on coming-to-be and passing-away; some comments, 1946.
- Mimesis; Plato's doctrine of artistic imitation and its meaning to us, 1949.
- Platenatlas bij Homerus, 1955.
- Beknopte bibliographie voor de studie der Griekse taal- en letterkunde, 1960.
- Homer, the educator of the Greeks, 1970.
- Pindar's Seventh Olympian Ode. A commentary, 1972 - a new edition published in 1987, see below
- (with A. H. M. Kessels) A concise bibliography of Greek language and literature, 1979.
- A commentary on Hesiod Works and days, 1985.
- Commentaries on Pindar, in 2 vols.:
  - Vol. 1. Commentaries on Olympian 3, 7, 12, 14 (Brill, Mnemosyne Supplement 97, 1987)
  - Vol. 2. Commentaries on Olympian 1, 10; Nemean 11; Isthmian 2 (Brill, Mnemosyne Supplement 101, 1988)
  - A third volume with commentaries on Pythian 1, 8, 10 was proposed in the preface to vol. 1, but never published
