= Lorenzo Sabbatini =

Italian painter

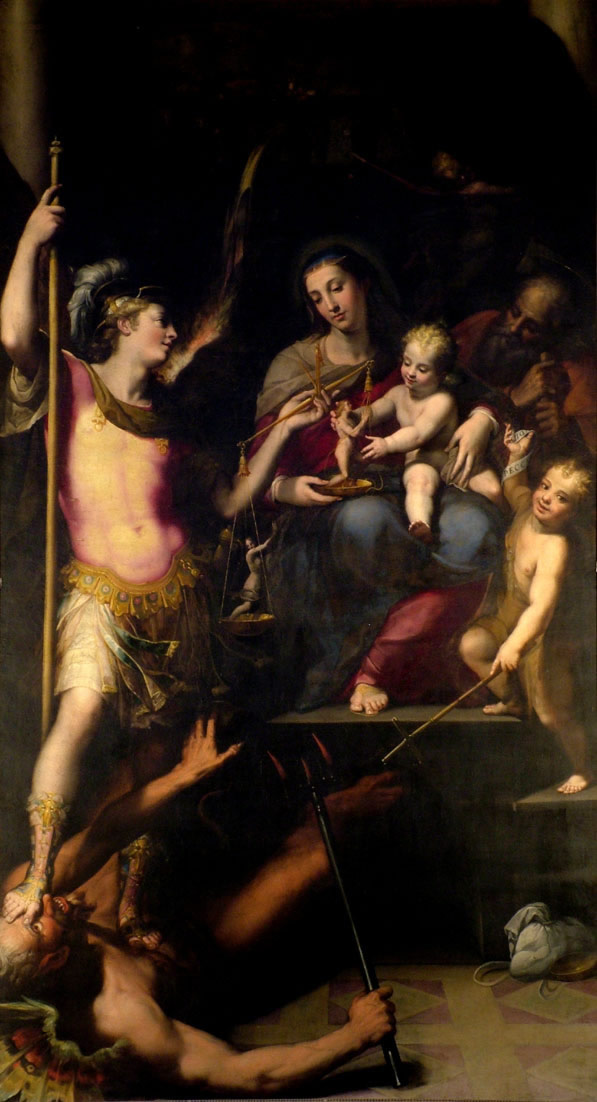
Lorenzo Sabatini and Denys Calvaert's depiction of the Holy Family with Saints John the Baptist and Michael in the church of San Giacomo Maggiore, Bologna

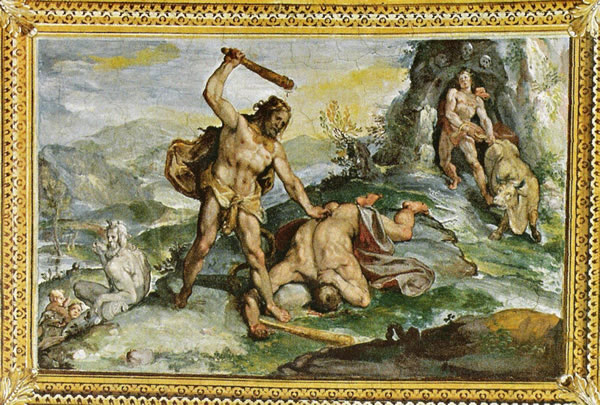
Cain and Abel.

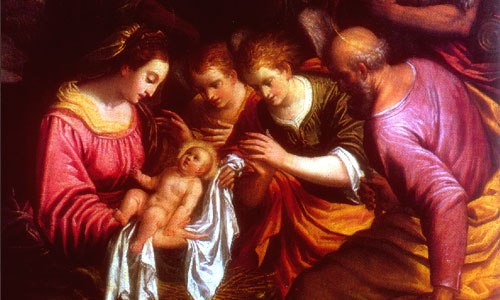
The Adoration by the Shepherds.

Lorenzo Sabbatini or Sabatini, Sabattini or Sabadini (c. 1530–1576), sometimes referred to as Lorenzino da Bologna, was an Italian painter of the Mannerist period from Bologna.

== Biography ==
Sabbatini was born in Bologna and studied with Prospero Fontana, who was his teacher and collaborator, and was a friend of Orazio Samacchini. His style was also influenced by Giorgio Vasari and the Emilian mannerism of Parmigianino.

By 1565 he was working with the studio of Giorgio Vasari in Florence, where was elected member of the Academy.

Between 1566 and 1573 he was in Bologna, where he decorated the walls of several churches, including Santa Maria delle Grazie, Chiesa della Morte, San Martino Maggiore, and San Giacomo Maggiore.

In 1573 he moved to Rome to work under Vasari in the Cappella Paolina (with Federico Zuccari) and Sala Regia of the Vatican, where he adopted many of the stylistic traits of Raphael's school and produced perhaps his most famous painting, The Triumph of Faith over Infidelity. After Vasari's death in 1574, Gregory XIII appointed Sabatini superintendent of works in the Vatican, a post he retained until his own premature death.

Sabbatini died in Rome on August 2, 1576. His students included the engraver Giulio di Antonio Bonasone and the painter of Flemish origin, Denis Calvaert.

== Works ==
- Holy Family and Saints, Sant'Egidio, Bologna
- The Triumph of Faith over Infidelity
- Assumption of the Virgin (Pinacoteca Nazionale, Bologna)
- Frescoes at the Malvasia Chapel (1566–70, San Giacomo Maggiore, Bologna)
  - The Four Evangelists
  - The Four Teachers of the Church (1570)
- The Holy Family with Saints John and Michael Archangel (1570, San Giacomo Maggiore), executed in part with Denys Calvaert
- Virgin and Child with Saint John (1572), Louvre, Paris
