= Giulio Bonasone =

Italian painter and engraver born in Bologna (c. 1498–after 1574)

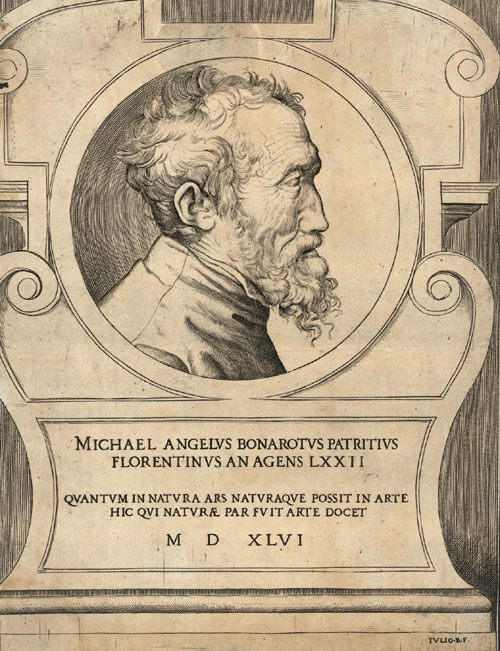
Michelangelo by Giulio Bonasone

Giulio Bonasone (c. 1498 – after 1574) (or Giulio de Antonio Buonasone or Julio Bonoso) was an Italian painter and engraver born in Bologna. He possibly studied painting under Lorenzo Sabbatini, and painted a Purgatory for the church of San Stefano, but all his paintings have been lost. He is better known as an engraver and is believed to have trained with Marcantonio Raimondi. He worked mainly in Mantua, Rome and Venice and with great success, producing etchings and engravings after the old masters and his own designs. He signed his plates B., I.B., Julio Bonaso, Julio Bonasone, Juli Bonasonis, Julio Bolognese Bonahso.

He has been regarded an engraver with extraordinary skills in reproducing, as he could accurately convey the sources' compositions, colours, and essence. He expressed his understanding about the controversies about religion and culture in his time through his prints.

== Life ==
There are debates about the birth date of Giulio Bonasone due to the lack of documentation. Since he was active during 1531 to 1571, his birthday could be placed around 1513 or earlier if engraving was a part of his formal education. One reason to believe that he was still a student in 1531 is that the work dated to 1531 lacks craftsmanship and familiarity with anatomy.

Giulio Bonasone's work does not appear in published collections of documents nor in the state archives of Bologna. In one document, Bonasone is related to Compagnia dello Quattro Arte and is mentioned to be an auditor of the Guild. Nonetheless, no first name was given and his name was not found in the very few extant name lists of the Compagnia.

== Art ==
Giulio Bonasone produced both engravings and etchings, and frequently a combination of both in a single work. His works include religious, secular as well as erotic content. A total of 357 prints are attributed to Bonasone, approximately 200 of which can be dated with some certainty. Bonasone's prints include 9 Old Testament Scenes, 35 New Testament Scenes, 25 about the Virgin, 8 concerning the Saints, 5 regarding historical events, 150 about parables, 85 dealing with mythology, 5 fantasies, 6 portraits and 6 about architecture. His prints usually come as series. For instance, he dedicated 22 to Loves of the Gods, 26 recounting the Life of Juno and a series of 22 prints about the Passion of Christ.

=== Originality ===
According to Giulio Bonasone's own claim, more than 114 prints, not counting the ones he produced for Bocchi, are his original works. In fact, many of the 150 illustrative prints for Bocchi are his own designs as well. His own creations are usually labelled with "Giulio Bonasone Inventore" or something similar. His engravings after other artists' designs can be categorized into two groups: those that closely replicate the original work, such as the Creation of Eve after Michelangelo, and those incorporating changes at Bonasone's will, such as Clelia Crossing the Tiber after Polidoro. The latter were often labelled by him as "imitations".

=== Selectivity ===
Bonasone was quite selective in choosing the artists after whom to work. He favoured the great masters of the sixteenth century. He made eighteen prints for the works of Raphael and his school, eleven prints for Michelangelo, fourteen for Giulio Romano and ten for Parmigianino. Primaticcio and Jacopino del Conte inspired one engraving work, Perino del Vaga inspired five, Poliodoro da Caravaggio was the source of two and Titian was the source for more than five. Antique sculpture, especially reliefs, was also a great source of inspiration for him. He modelled sixteen prints after classical sources and specific models can be found for at least five.

== Artistic development ==
=== Early period (1530s) ===
It seems that Bonasone started his career during the 1530s, when the earliest of his engravings can be dated. Among them is the St Cecilia (1531), which is a rough attempt in reproducing Raphael's work.

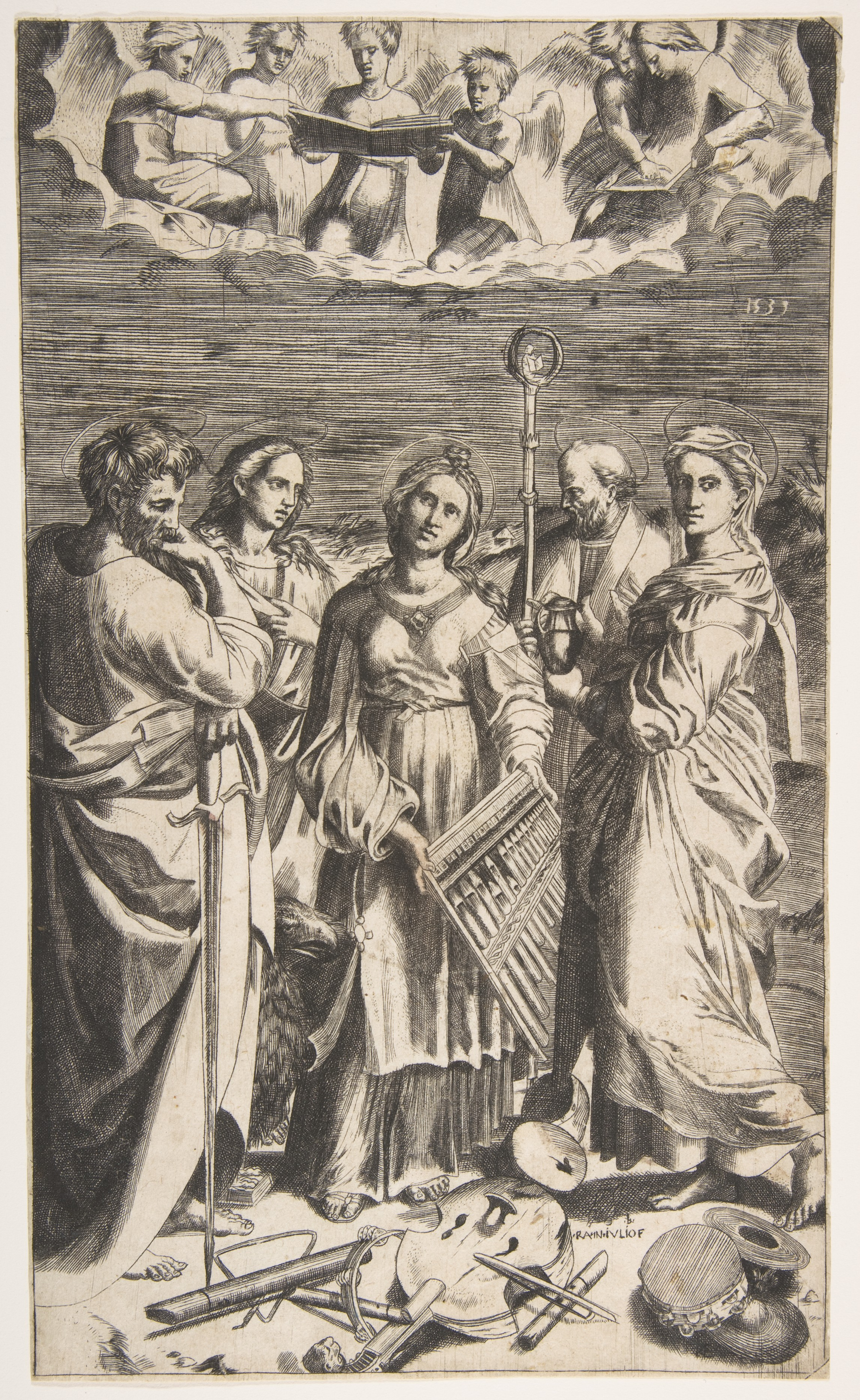

The pervasive use of straight hatching lines, an indication of his awkward technique, is the evidence for it being an early work. Another work of Bonasone, Adam and Eve Toiling, also demonstrates a clumsiness.

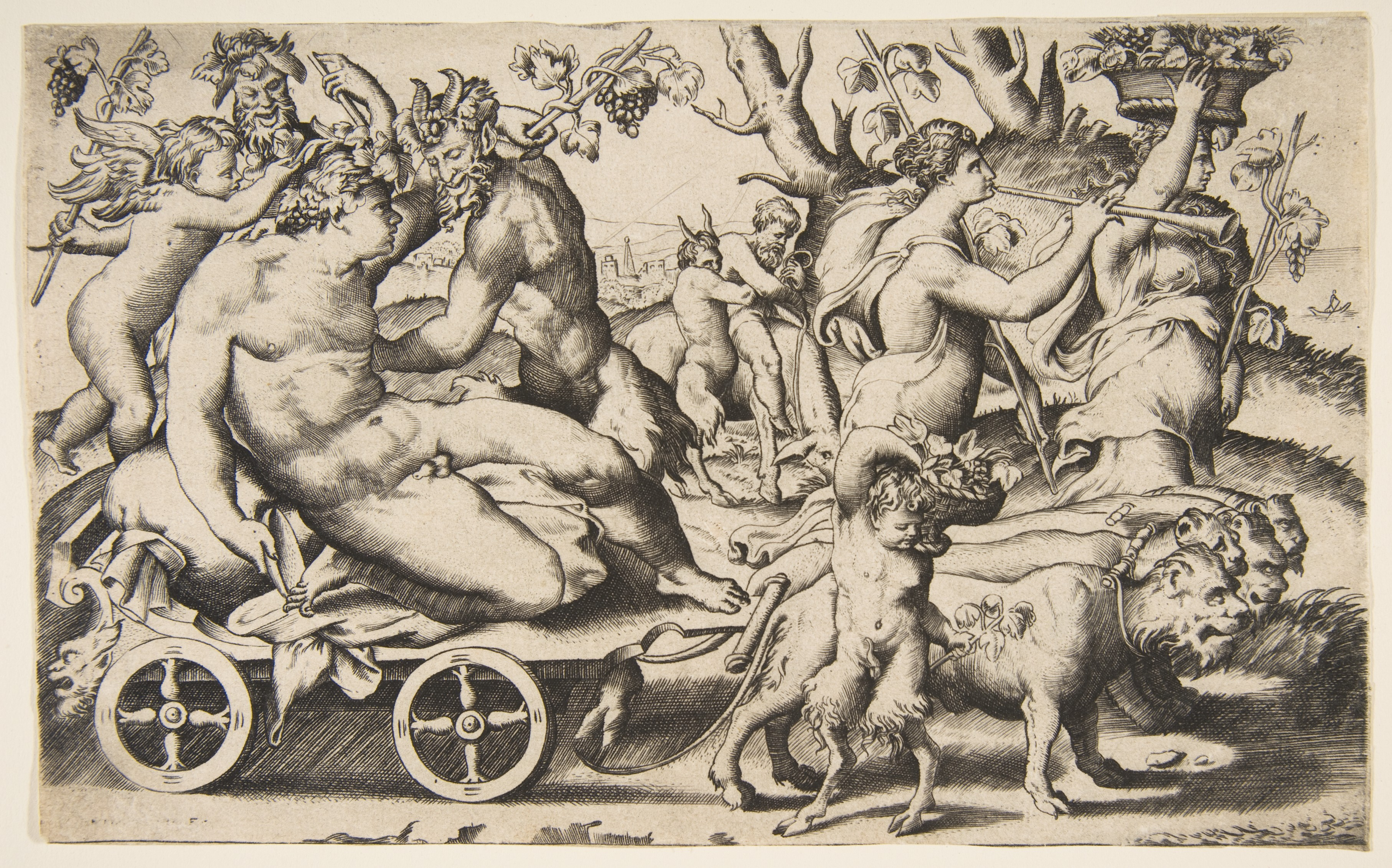

The Triumph of Bacchus was executed at a slightly later time. This etching presents more advanced skills and clearer lines, but the presence of straight hatching lines is still a major problem in Bonasone's technique. This absence of contouring lines leads to a lack of depth in figures and makes the figures less real. In the Triumph of Bacchus, contrasting tones resemble the use of light and shade in painting. This later became an identifying feature of Bonasone's prints.

At about the same time of the Triumph of Bucchus, Bonasone produced seven prints after Giulio Romano, which are: The Birth and Apotheosis of Caesar, The Wreath, Saturn and His Three Sons, The Division of the Universe, Neptune Takes Possession of the Sea, Pluto Takes Possession of Hell, and Jupiter and Juno Take Possession of Heaven. The last four were probably created as a series of works of similar subjects and themes. These seven prints show a greater consistency in the artist's skills and his recognition of what engraving, as a medium, could and could not achieve. In fact, Bonasone's technique of tight systems of lines precisely captured both the forms and the contrast in light in Romano's work. While Bonasone's early technique fitted Romano's work particularly well, he stopped using Romano's work after he developed more gentle ways of building up tonal contrast.

These paintings display uniform, short, curved, hatching marks employed to delineate human bodies. The lines are closely arranged and connected to short flicks and dots. However, the muscles are not carefully depicted and muscles at different body parts or under different motion are treated indistinguishably. A similar technique is observed in Marcantonio Raimondi's prints. It is possible that Bonasone was influenced by Raimondi.

At the same time, this technique may also imply a connection between Bonasone and Giovanni Battista Scultori. Similar skills and forms are found in Bonasone's and Scultori's engravings after Giulio Romano. Since Scultori was engraving in Mantua in the early 1540s and most of his prints date from around 1543, it is likely that Bonasone paid a trip to Mantua and learnt from Scultori. The short distance between Bologna and Mantua, one of the most important art centers in Italy, added to the likelihood of this trip. Another important evidence is that seven prints done during this period were done after designs by Ramano, who was in Mantua at that time. Nonetheless, no documentation about such a trip has been found. It is possible that Bonasone learnt of designs of Romano through prints and drawings instead of going to Mantua. The particular technique shared by Bonasone and Scultori could also be developed by each of the two artists independently, since this technique is obtained by formalizing the innovations in Marcantonio Raimondi's prints.

=== Roman period (1540s) ===
Many of Bonasone's works during the 1540s are reproductive works of Roman frescos. Those works could not be possibly created without Bonasone's close observation to the originals. Given the accuracy of his works in translating the paintings, one could reasonably guess that Bonasone moved to Rome for an extended period of time instead of paying short visits occasionally. This was the period that witnessed great increase in Bonasone's display of draftsmanship.

Many of his prints from the 1540s are dated and the techniques were somewhat similar. Bonasone started to create longer curved hatching lines and arrange the curved hatching lines so closely that, with the vertical cross-hatchings, the lines look like patches of black. Such dark patches form a contrast with areas of white and display a painting-like quality of great strength. Prints that illustrate this technique mostly clearly are those done after Michelangelo, such as the Creation of Eve, Judith and Holofernes, and Clelia Crossing the Tiber after Polidoro da Caravaggio.

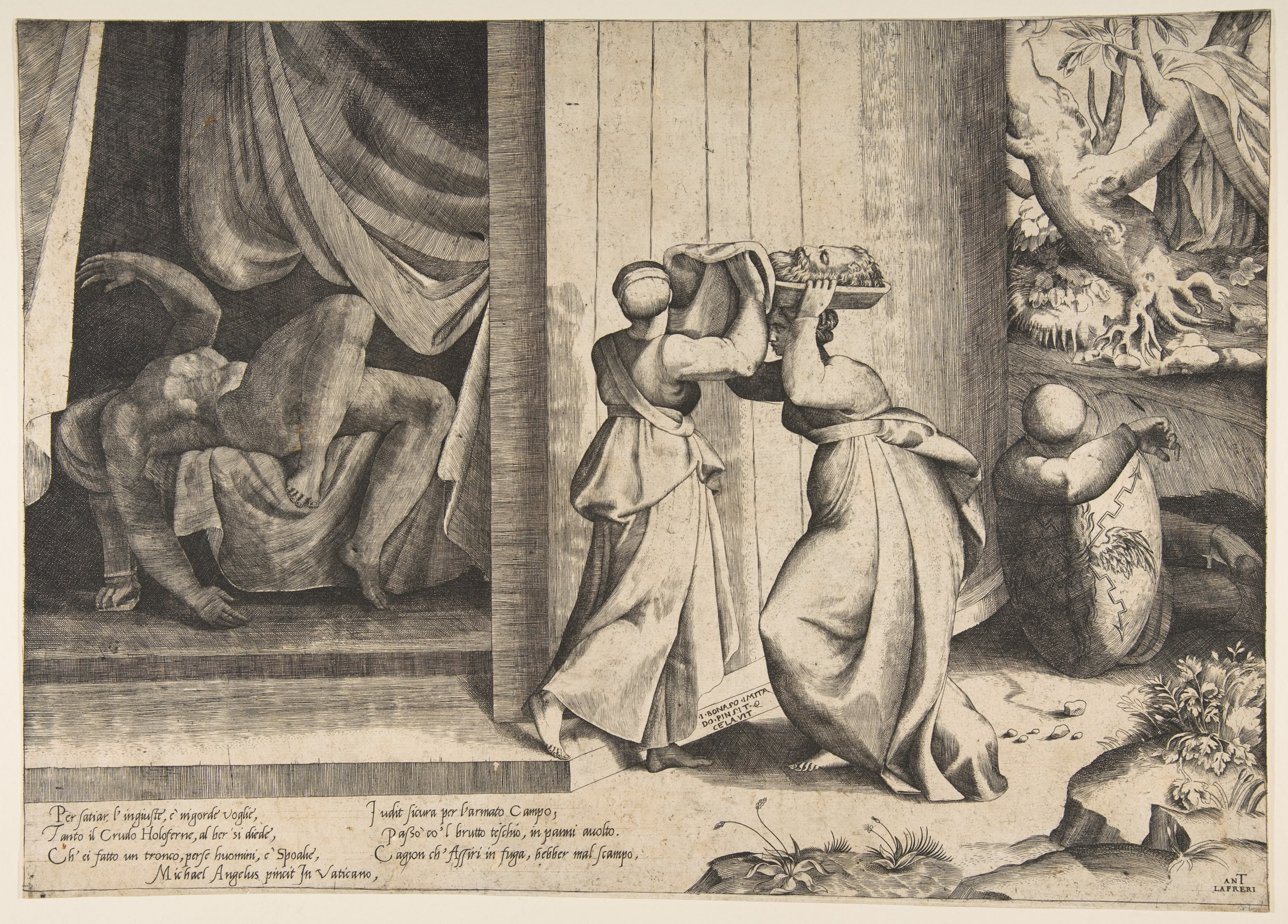
Judith Passing the Head of Holofernes to Her Maidservant by Giulio Bonasone

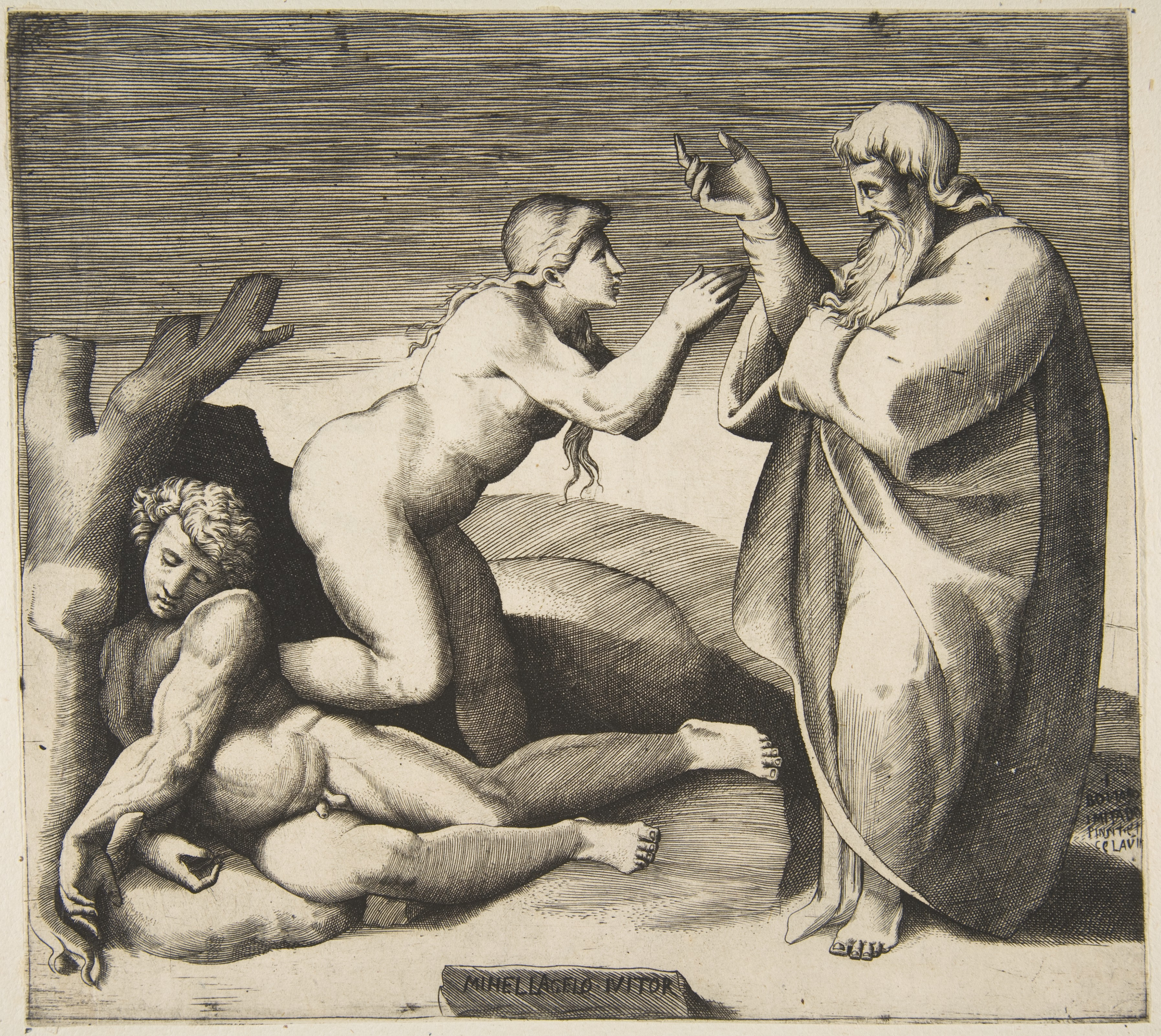
The creation of Eve who emerges from behind Adam by Giulio Bonasone

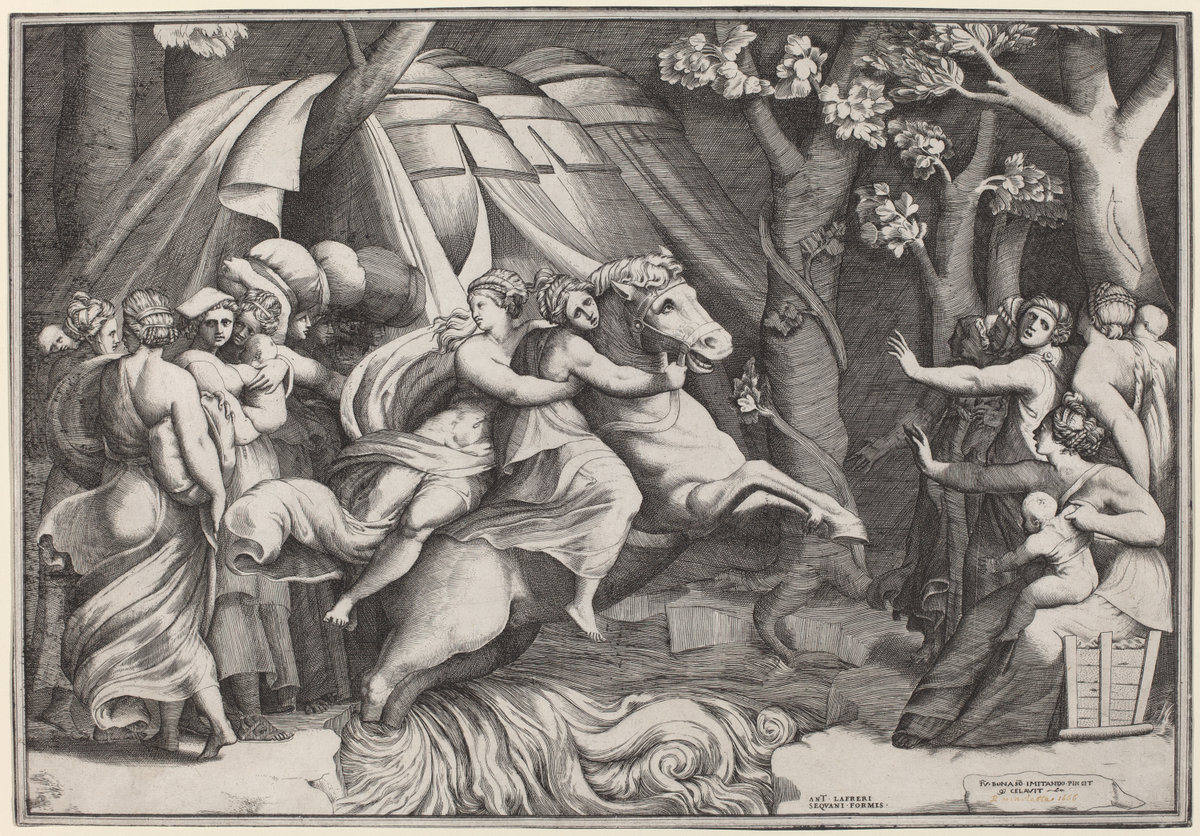
Clelia Crossing the Tiber by Giulio Bonasone

When Bonasone produced prints after Roman frescos, he demonstrated astonishing capabilities to understand and represent the colour and the taste of masterpieces. As a result, Cumberland suggested that Bonasone used different skills for different artworks. In fact, Bonasone's technique was consistent during the 1540s; what changed was not technique, but the way in which Bonasone dealt with light and form. His engravings, viewed from a distance, are like black-and-white paintings. By executing his engravings in such a painterly manner, Bonasone excelled as a reproductive engraver. His engravings resembled the masterpieces to a superb degree without the common problem of triteness.

The prints during this period may lead viewers to conclude that the draftsmanship of Bonasone was limited by that of the art pieces he was referring to. He seems to inherit the excellences of Michelangelo, Raphael or Parmigianio but also the defects of the archaic works. When he was making original designs, his forms became distinguishably awkward with rare exceptions. The Elysium of Lovers, created in 1545, was marked as his own invention. The ungainly draftsmanship displayed in this work should not be relegated as the effect to be achieved by a mannerist. Instead, it is a prime example of a mannerist attempting come up with some original ideas after being trained to model after other people's works. In contrast, the forms in the Couple Embracing by the Seashore are significantly more elegant. To produce this painting, Bonasone probably drew inspiration from different models.

In summary, the 1540s was a particularly productive period for Bonasone. The prints were too many to be chronologically catalogued. Nonetheless, his technique did not undergo rapid growth and there is fluctuation in the quality of his engravings.

=== The Bologna period and the new technique (1550s–1560s) ===
In 1555, Achiliuls Bocchi first published a book of symbols in Bologna. Bonasone made small engravings to 150 of the verses in this book. Although the engravings vary in quality, it is likely that composing and executing these engravings required a few years' work in the 1550s. Moreover, there was no work dated to the 1550s that had Roman styles. This further reinforces the theory that Bonasone spent at least part of the decade working in Bologna to produce the illustrations for Bocchi and a couple of other works at the same time.

The small size of these engravings constrains the amount of detail and the room for innovation. The lines and hatchings are usually systemized and cursory. It appears that Bonasone believed the nature of his project to be illustrative and prioritized the clarity of iconography over the style.

Bonasone's The Passion of Christ has been dated by some art historians at the fledging stage of Bonasone's career. Nevertheless, the crudeness in skill might be explained by the limitations imposed by the small size of the print. In fact, the brightness and colour scheme are more similar to Bonasone's works of the 1560s than those of the 1530s or 1540s, and the composition is more advanced than what the artist was capable of during his early stage. Moreover, Bonasone did not attempt original prints such as this during the 1530s. Hence, the Passion of Christ was probably conceived and executed when Bonasone resided in Bologna during the 1560s.

This decade also witnessed changes in Bonasone's technique, which was to become more tactual and more unusual in atmosphere. The Judgement of Paris produced during this decade is probably Bonasone's magum opus that marks the apex of his technical development. What is special about this work, and other works at that time, is Bonasone's use of a mixed intaglio medium. Initially, Bonasone did not mix the media. He developed his engraving technique to an extraordinarily fine and revealing standard. He used small flicks achieve tonal gradation, the technique of transiting one colour hue to another, and a tangible sense of form. Contour shading lines were lengthened and became softened. The contrast between brightness and darkness became less obvious but still possessed a painting-like quality. In fact, the lighting and texture became closer to venetian painting than Roman painting. Human faces became more vivid after Bonasone reduced the use of linear burin. For instance, in his print after Raphael's The Pietà Near the Cave, Bonasone successfully portrayed the Madonna's sorrow with his new technique, a great breakthrough since the 1540s.

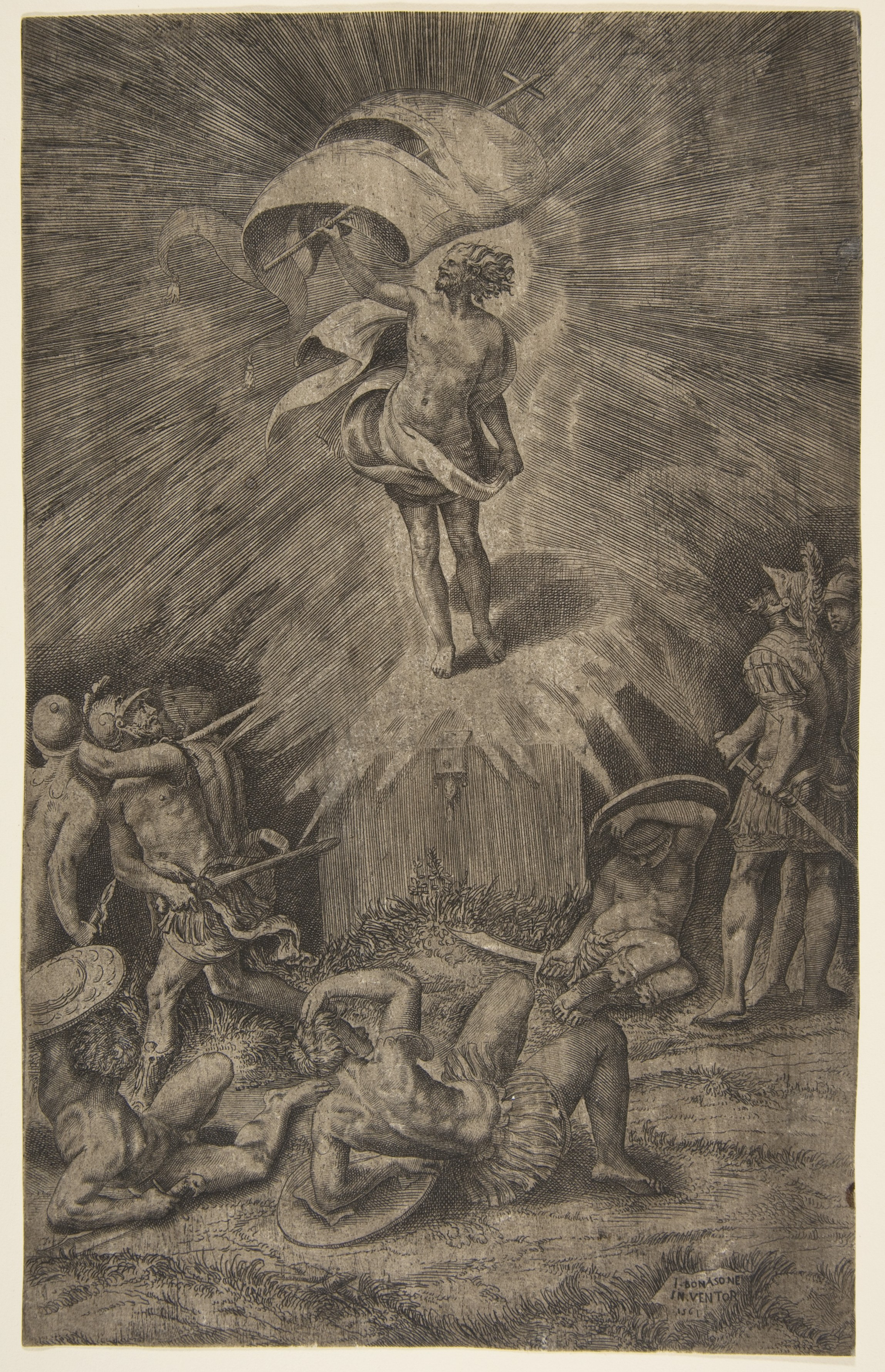
The Resurrection by Giulio Bonasone, 1561

Engravings done with this technique started in the late 1550s but concentrated in the early 1560s. After that, this tonal engraving skill was combined with etching to achieve great beauty and depth. The first dated print that contains both media is the Resurrection produced in 1561.

Bonasone's choice of different media to achieve varied effects is the most noteworthy aspect of his technique. Though human body was still engraved with burin, landscapes and backgrounds started to be rendered with etching. This forms the effect of having human forms of engraved tonality glowing on a deep and rich etched background. Meanwhile, The Judgement of Paris stands out from other prints for its draftsmanship.

This technique highlighted the merits of Bonasone's skills in each medium and achieved good effects. While Bonasone's earlier engravings reflected his weakness in representing landscapes in that medium, his pure etchings revealed his lack of confidence in dealing with figures. Using etching for background and engraving for human forms worked to circumvent this problem.

Viewing the Judgement of Paris at a short distance, one would find it reflective of light. In fact, the tonal gradations of the nude forms, the body of Mercury in particular, are extremely delicate and minimal lines are employed without obscuring the outlines of human bodies. Since tones, not lines, are the primary way of defining figures, this print looks like a monochromatic painting. Bonasone then used etching to show the details of flora and fauna surrounding the nudes. The artist made no particular attempt to integrate the two media and he meant to juxtapose them to achieve the unique visual effects.

Bonasone's blending of two media, featuring the subtleness of etching and the atmospheric use of engraving, is a match of Titian's paintings, especially Titian's The Rest on the Flight to Egypt. He is probably the artist who best capture the essence, sfumato, colour and quality that belong uniquely to Venetian paintings.

Evidence shows that Bonasone developed another technique later in his life but it was unclear whether he continued engraving by mixing the media. Around 1572–1574, the engraving lines in Bonasone's work started to become broader. The contour lines also became longer, swelling, and more sinuous as the lines moved around the forms. Lines became less densely spaced, less deeply cut and more consistent in their depth. Overall, this style bore similarities with some works by Giovanni Jacopo Caraglio and the usual technique of the Dutch artist Cornelius Cort. In turn, this technique was also observed in later works by Agostino Carracci, implying the influences from Cort to Bonasone to Carracci. In Bonasone's original design, the Incarnarion, one would find the composition properly conceived but the technique distinct from that of the Judgement of Paris. The tiny flicks and subtle lines are replaced by broad contours of non-constant thickness. Although Bonasone did not adopt the method of varying a single line's depth to create the effect for shadows, he connected the deeper lines to the shallower ones to attain the same goal. Several other prints such as The Holy Family with Saints Elizabeth and John, and the Holy family with St John, could also be included in this category. However, Bonasone did not apply this technique uniformly across all his engravings. He made variation to his technique to achieve different effects, sometimes imitating the style of Giulio Romano and sometimes approximating the style of Parmigiano.

It is difficult to determine whether Bonasone returned to Rome after working for Bocchi since his work after this period of time was based more on designs or panel paintings instead of Roman frescos. However, he probably returned to Rome to work on prints such Raphael's as Qua Vadis, the Virgin and Child with a Bird, and Michelangelo's Nude Carrying the Cross.

== Artistic achievements ==
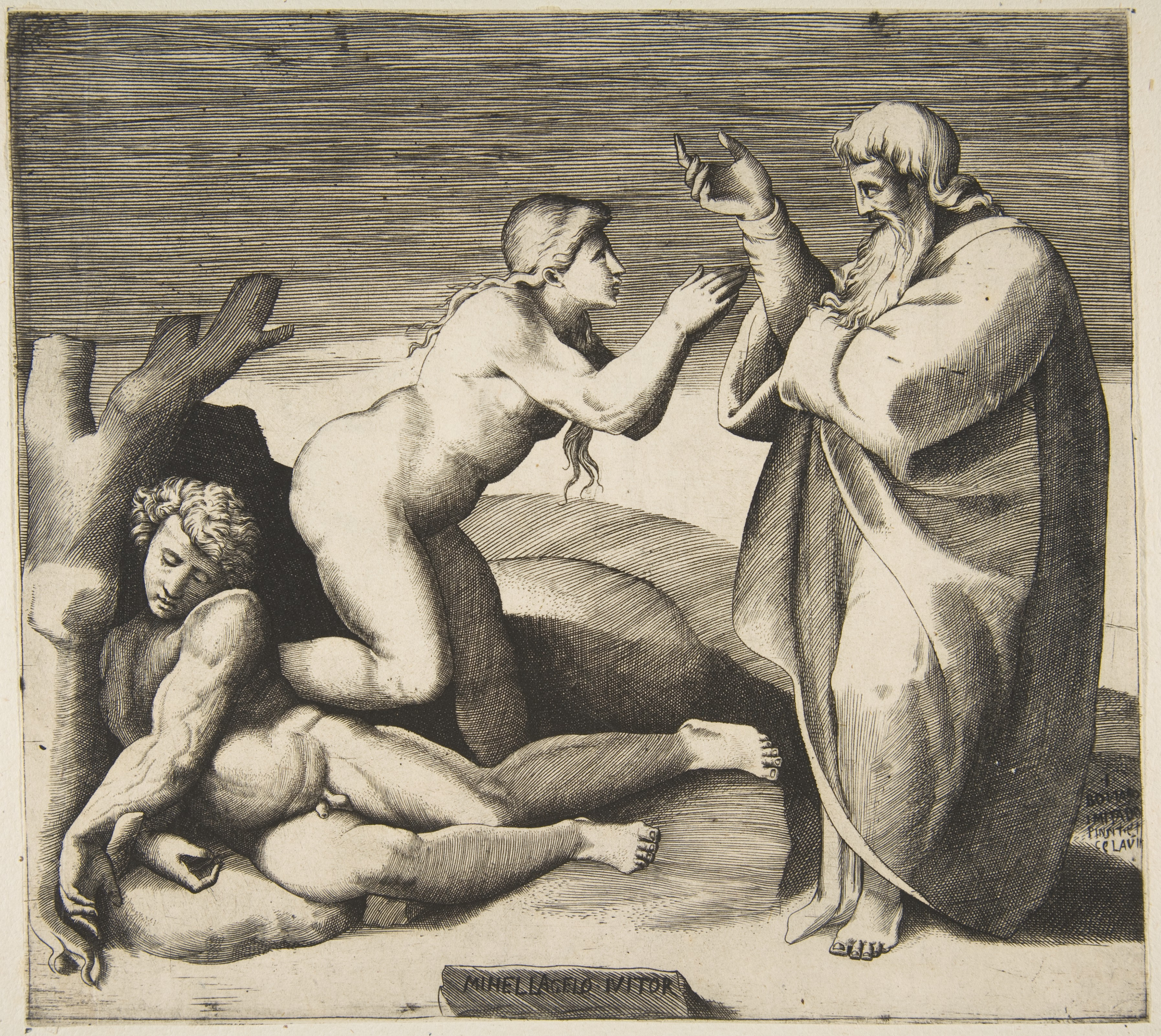
The creation of Eve who emerges from behind Adam by Giulio Bonasone

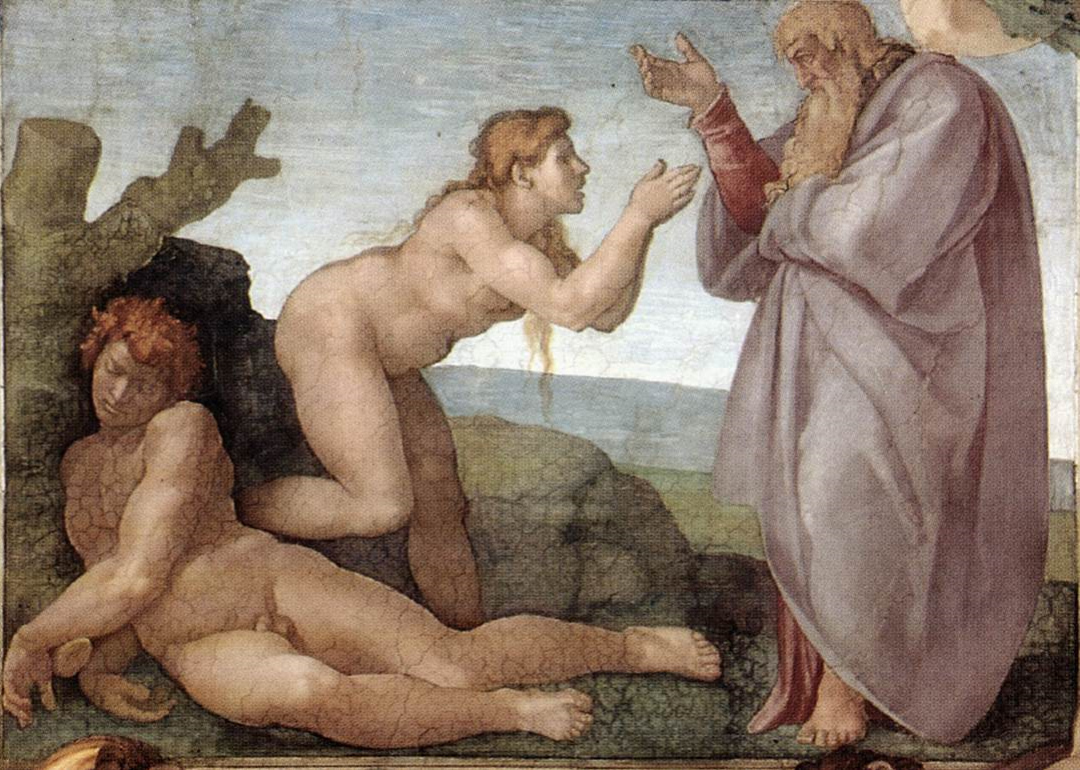
The Creation of Eve by Michelangelo

=== As a reproductive engraver ===
==== The Creation of Eve after Michelangelo ====
Many of Bonasone's work attained an astounding fidelity to the original work. One could analyze his work after Michelangelo, such as the Creation of Eve.

It is difficult to find a more accurate production of this fresco. Bonasone successfully achieved the painterly effect by underscoring the contrast between the bright and dark. Even the awkwardness of the right leg of Adam is translated to the engraving without being modified. The only visible difference in the figures is that Bonasone depicts God the Father to be shorter and more sturdy. Moreover, more space is left at the bottom and top of Bonasone's engraving.

==== Judith with the Head of Holofernes ====
Original work and the engraving of Judith with the Head of Holofernes

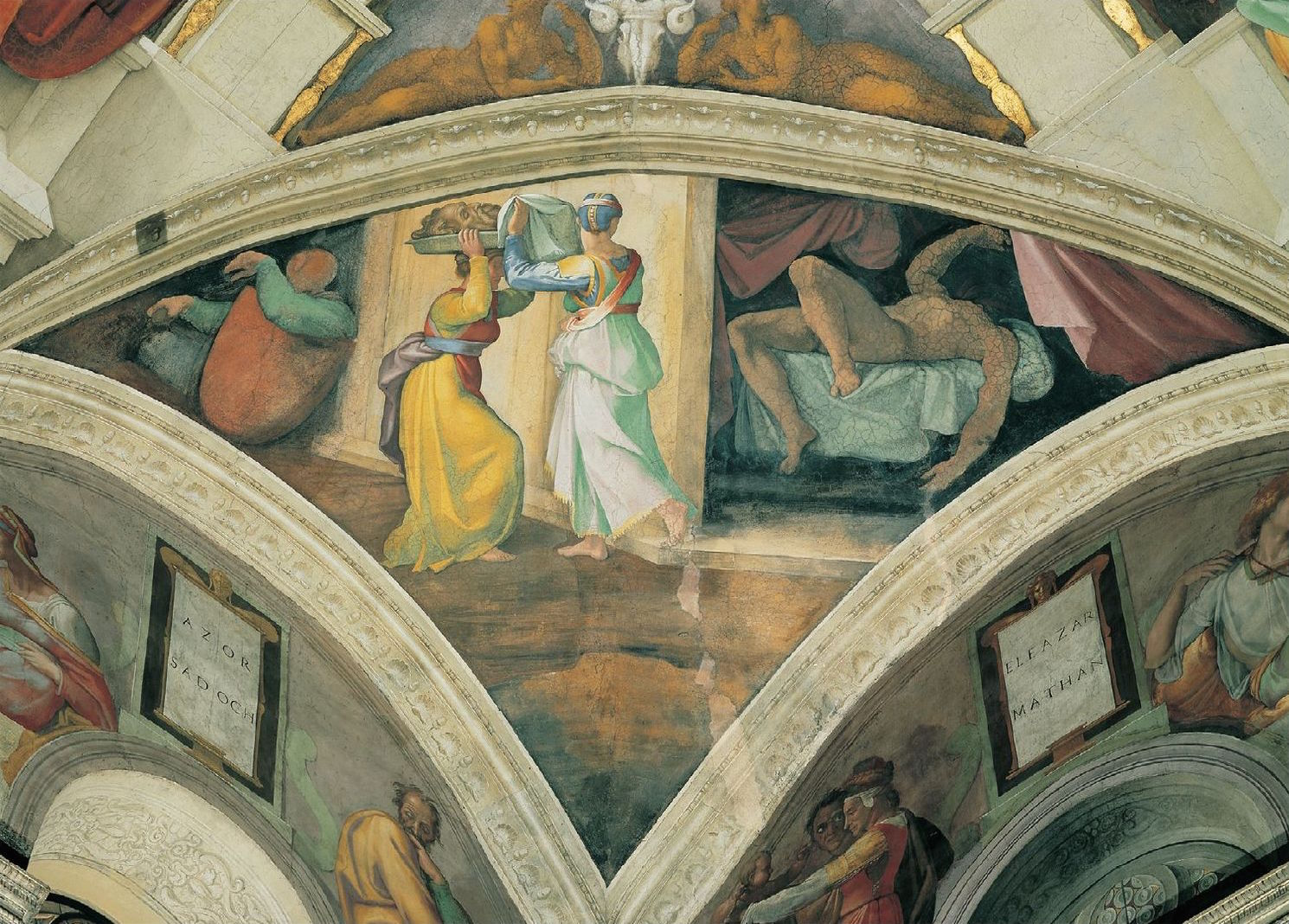
Judith with the Head of Holofernes by Michelangelo

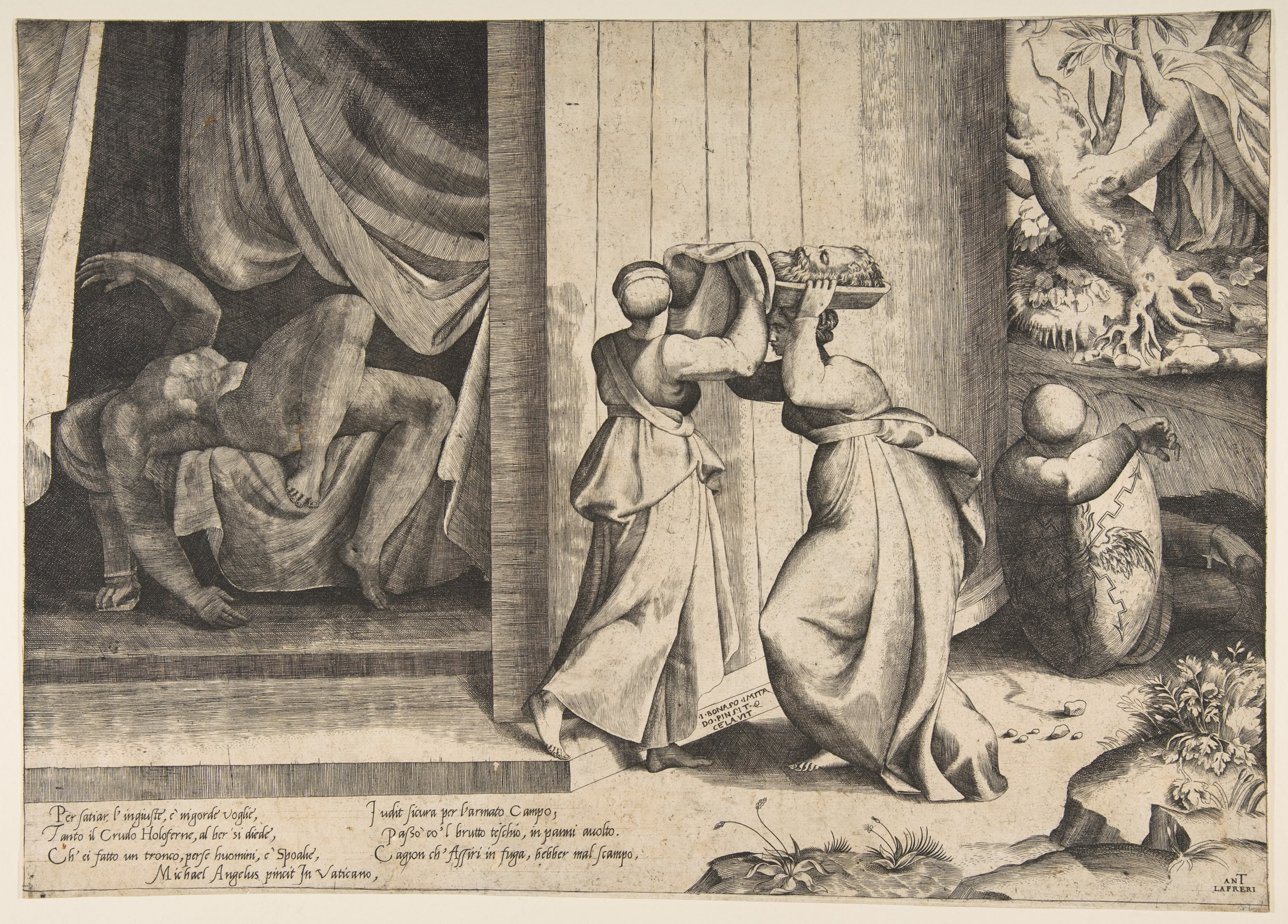
Judith with the Head of Holofernes by Giulio Bonasone

Bonasone's Judith with the Head of Holofernes, though containing many different details compared to Michelangelo's fresco in the Sistine Chapel, is still similar to the original work in its form. Bonasone 'translated almost line-by-line the central part of the fresco, which shows the action of the three figures. The artist employed the trick of highlighting the contrast between light and dark, as he did for the Creation of Eve, to achieve the visual impact of coloured painting.

"I. BONASO IMITADO" is found on this print to show changes are made by Bonasone on the original composition. In this particular work, changes are insignificant: Bonasone enlarged the background, landscape and surroundings to accommodate the change in shape from triangle to rectangle. These changes are executed with such care that they match the original design.

Original work and the engraving of the Last Judgement

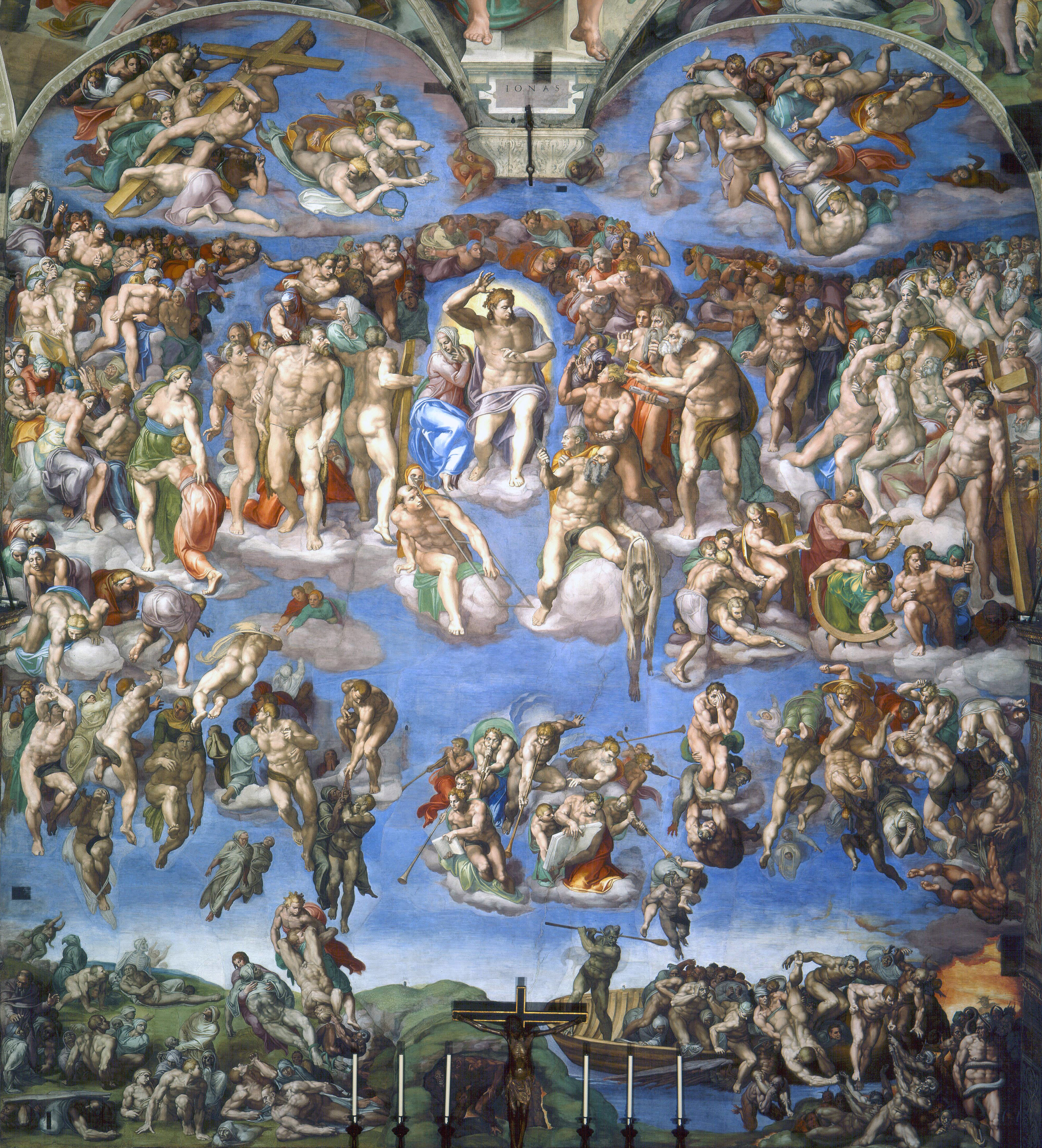
The Last Judgement by Michelangelo

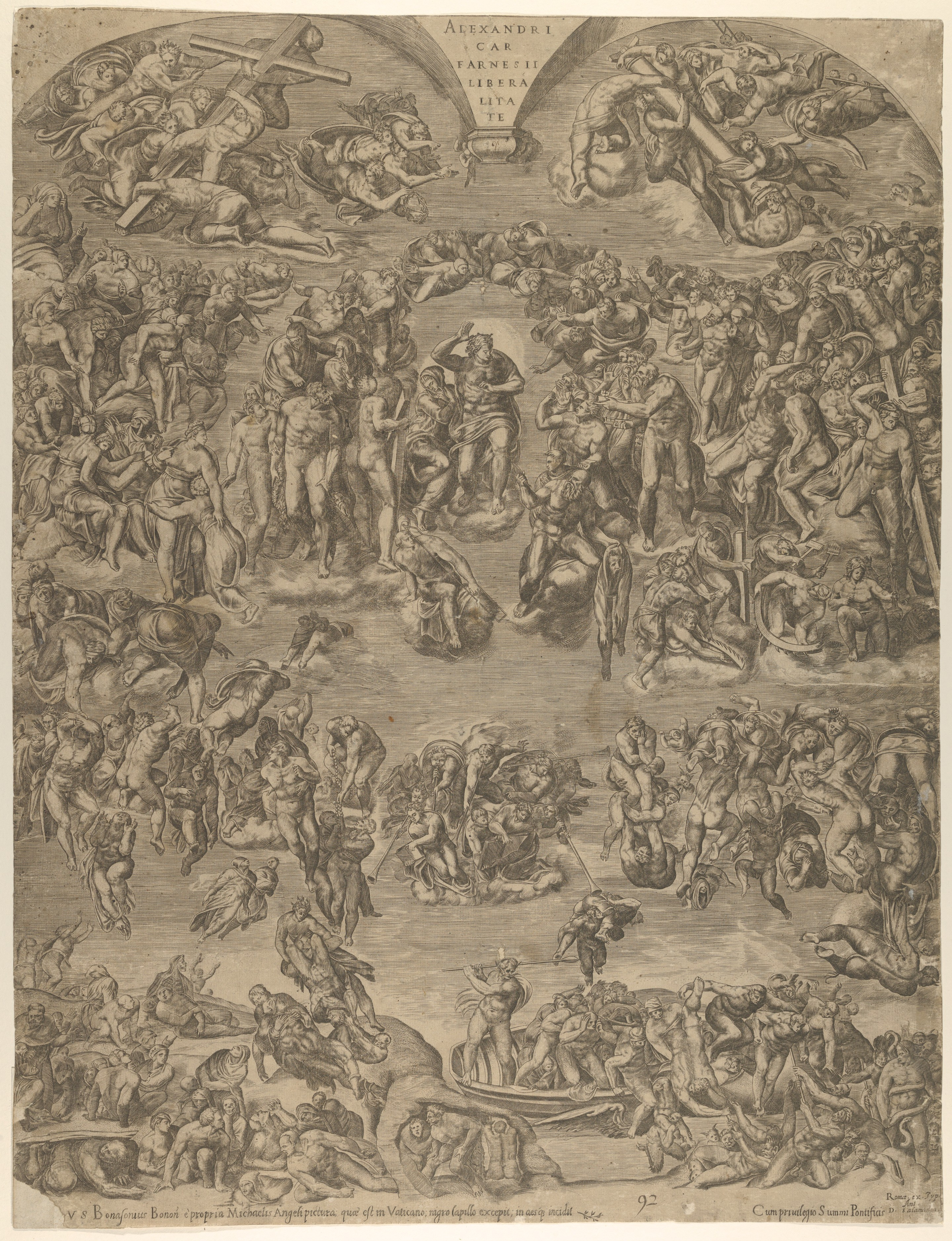
The Last Judgement by Giulio Bonasone after Michelangelo

==== The Last Judgement ====
Bonasone sometimes failed to accurately reproduce the original design when the model was especially complicated, and The Last Judgement illustrates this. Though Bonasone's rendition surpasses all the other contemporary prints of this giant fresco, it is far from being as good as the previously mentioned prints. Even with the large scale that engraving could possibly achieve, each individual figure in the painting had to be shrunk to a tiny size. As a result, most of the winding contour lines had to be removed. Similar problems are observed in Bonasone's other small-scaled prints such as the Juno series, The Passion of Christ, and the Bocchi illustrations.

Original work and the engraving of the Pietà

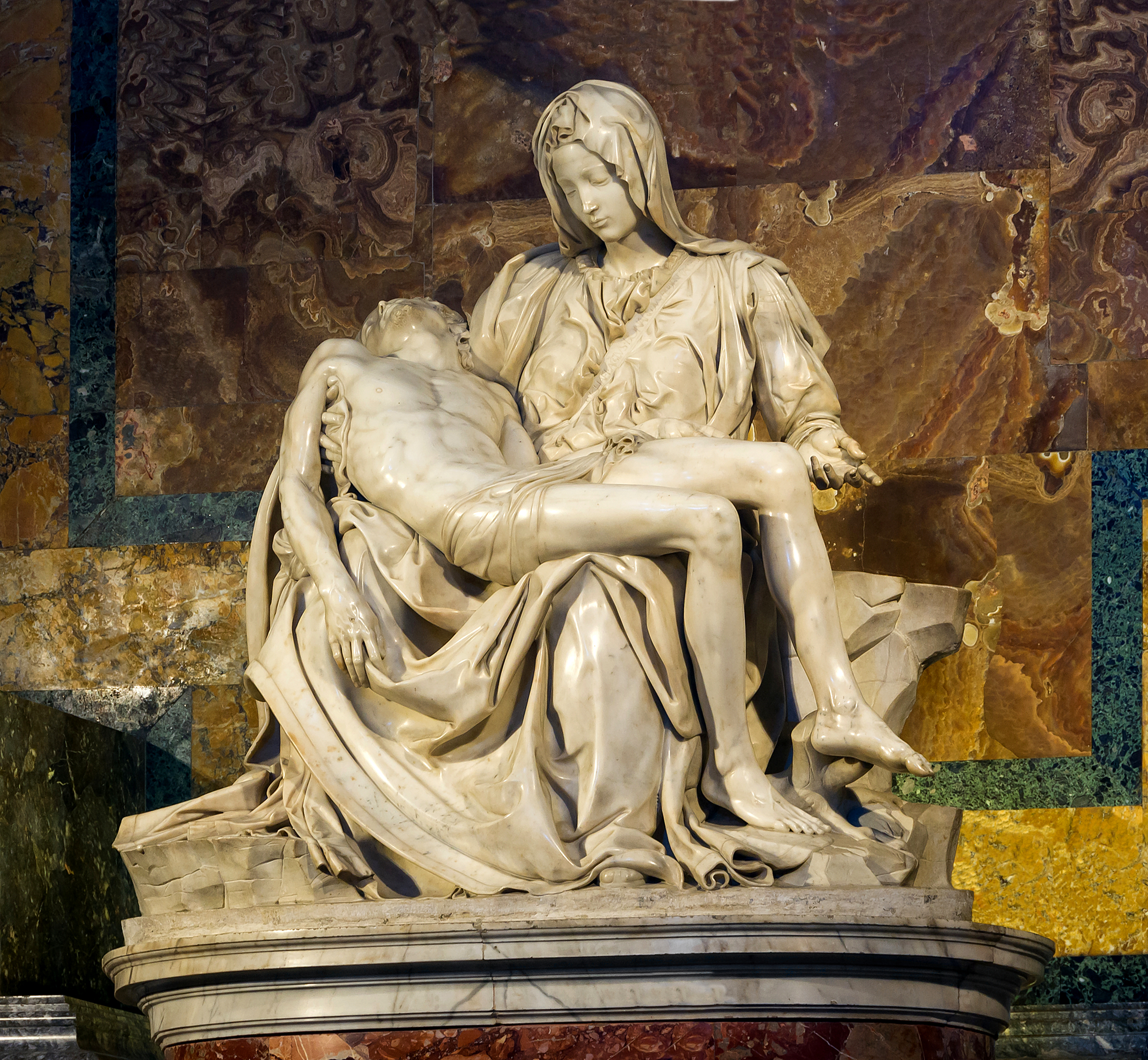
The Pietà by Michelangelo

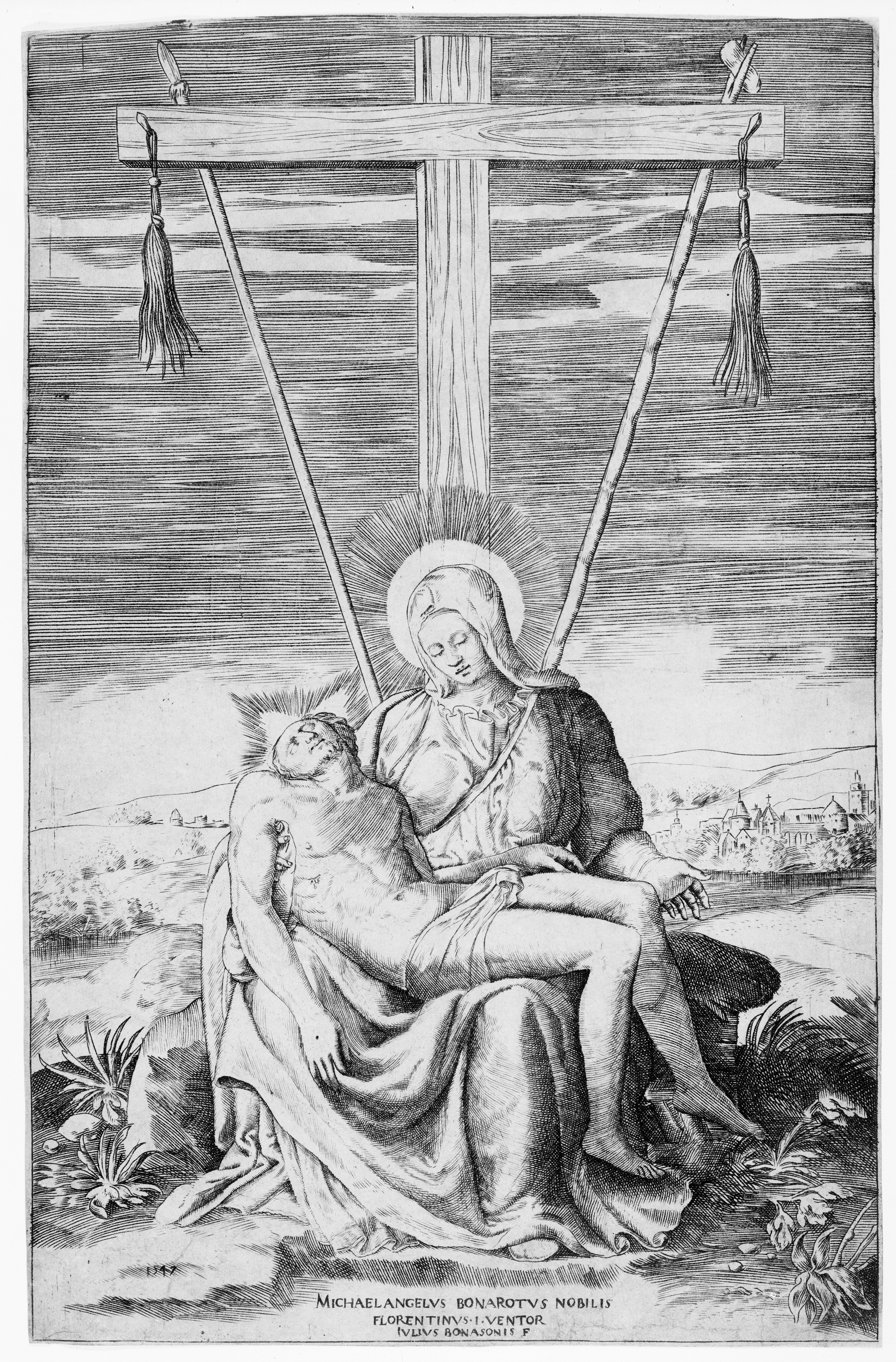
The Pietà by Giulio Bonasone after Michelangelo's sculpture

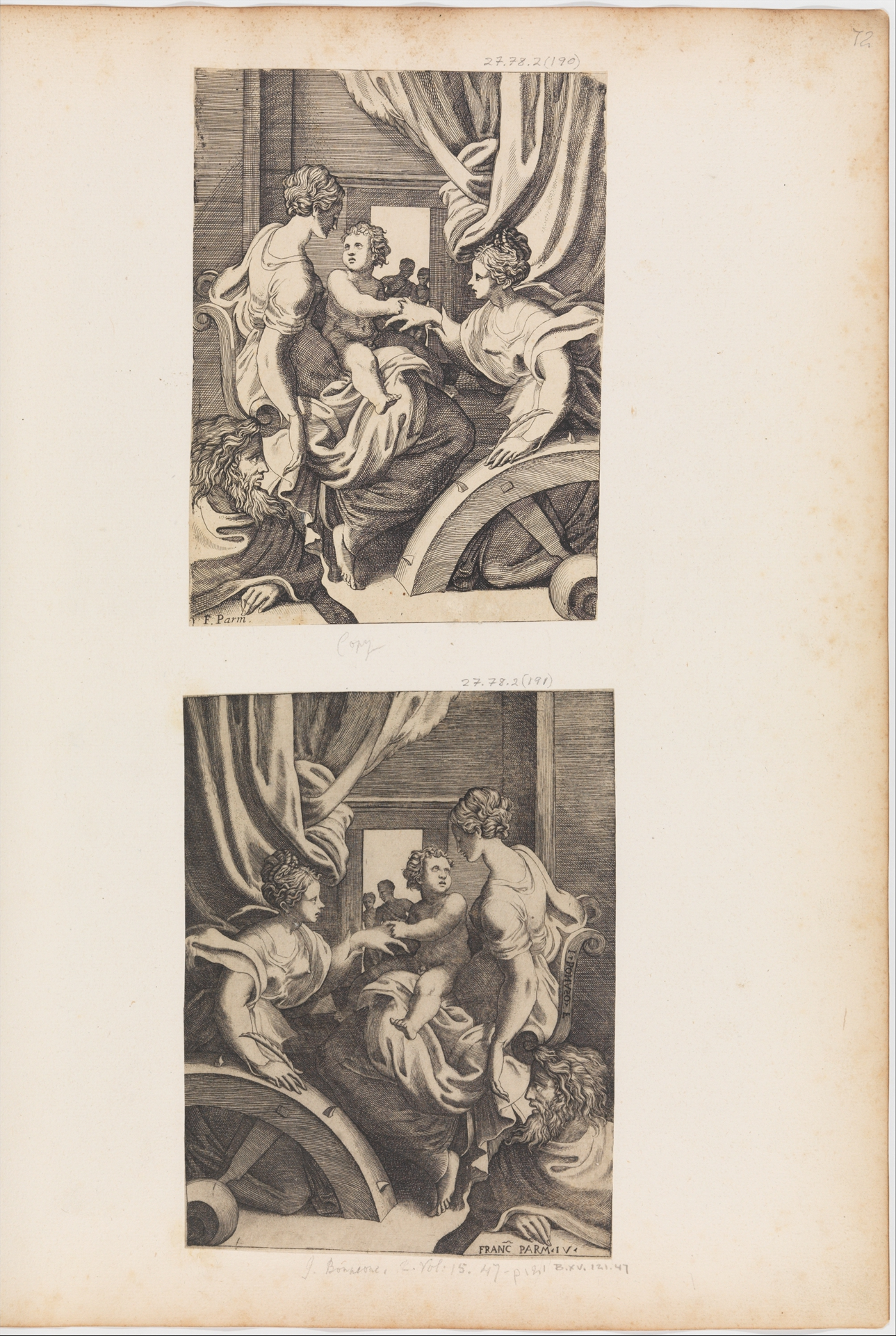
The Mystical Marriage of St Catherine by Giulio Bonasone after Parmigianino

==== The Pietà after Michelangelo ====
When trying to produce the print for Michelangelo's sculpture Pietà, Bonasone faced a different problem. While the Virgin is quite well handled, the form of Christ—especially his head and upper body—is far from being accurate. Since the work is dated 1547, such problems could hardly be explained by the lack of advancement in the artist's skills. An explanation to this mystery offered by Cumberland is that Bonasone could not see the statue at eye level, since it was placed high above the ground in Cumberland's time. However, Tolnay contends that the statue was not in such a position when Bonasone made his engraving of it. The foreshortening of the upper body of the dead Christ's body must have posed a great challenge to Bonasone to copy accurately. Despite this problem, Tolnay still thinks Bonasone's print is better than that of all other engravers.

==== The Mystical Marriage of St. Catherine after Parmigianino ====
When reproducing Parmigianino's work, Bonasone used longer contour lines and greater spacing between the lines in order to best capture the style of the artist. When he engraved after Parmigianino's The Mystical Marriage of St. Catherine, he produced a composition that was very similar to the source except that he took away the window and elongated the entire work in order to lengthen the man in the lower right corner. By using big patches of white and dark, Bonasone highlights the linear beauty of the Virgin's hair and reflects the tonal beauty of Parmigianino's painting.

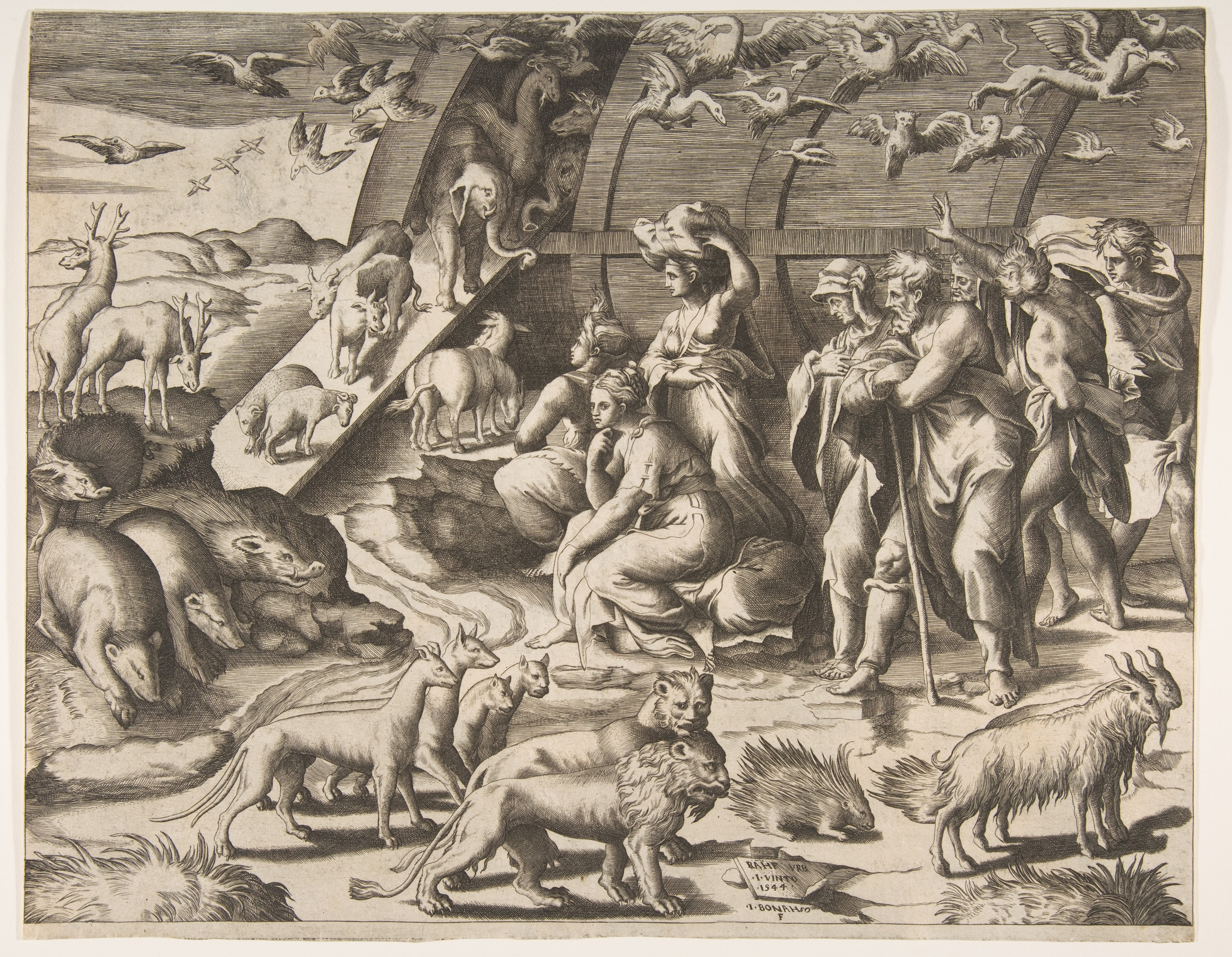
The Disembarkation from the Ark

==== The Disembarkation from the Ark after Raphael ====
It is challenging to evaluate the prints of Bonasone after Raphael's paintings due to the loss of many original paintings. Nonetheless, in general, many more modifications in composition are made compared to Bonasone's reproductive work after Michelangelo or Parmigianino. One possible explanation is that the alterations made by Marcantonio Raimondi when he was engraving after Raphael's paintings inspired later engravers to do the same. For instance, in his engraving the Disembarkation from the Ark after Raphale's fresco in the Vatican Loggie, he tried to make the composition more compact.

==== The Holy Family with St. John after Titian ====
When Bonasone was working after Titian, the liberty he took in reproducing Raphael's paintings was hardly observable. In fact, most of his works after Titian was produced in the 1560s, when his main technique was combining etching and engraving to represent the background and foreground respectively. One representative work was his Holy Family with St. John. Bonasone preserved the soft quality in Venetian painting by using etching for the background.

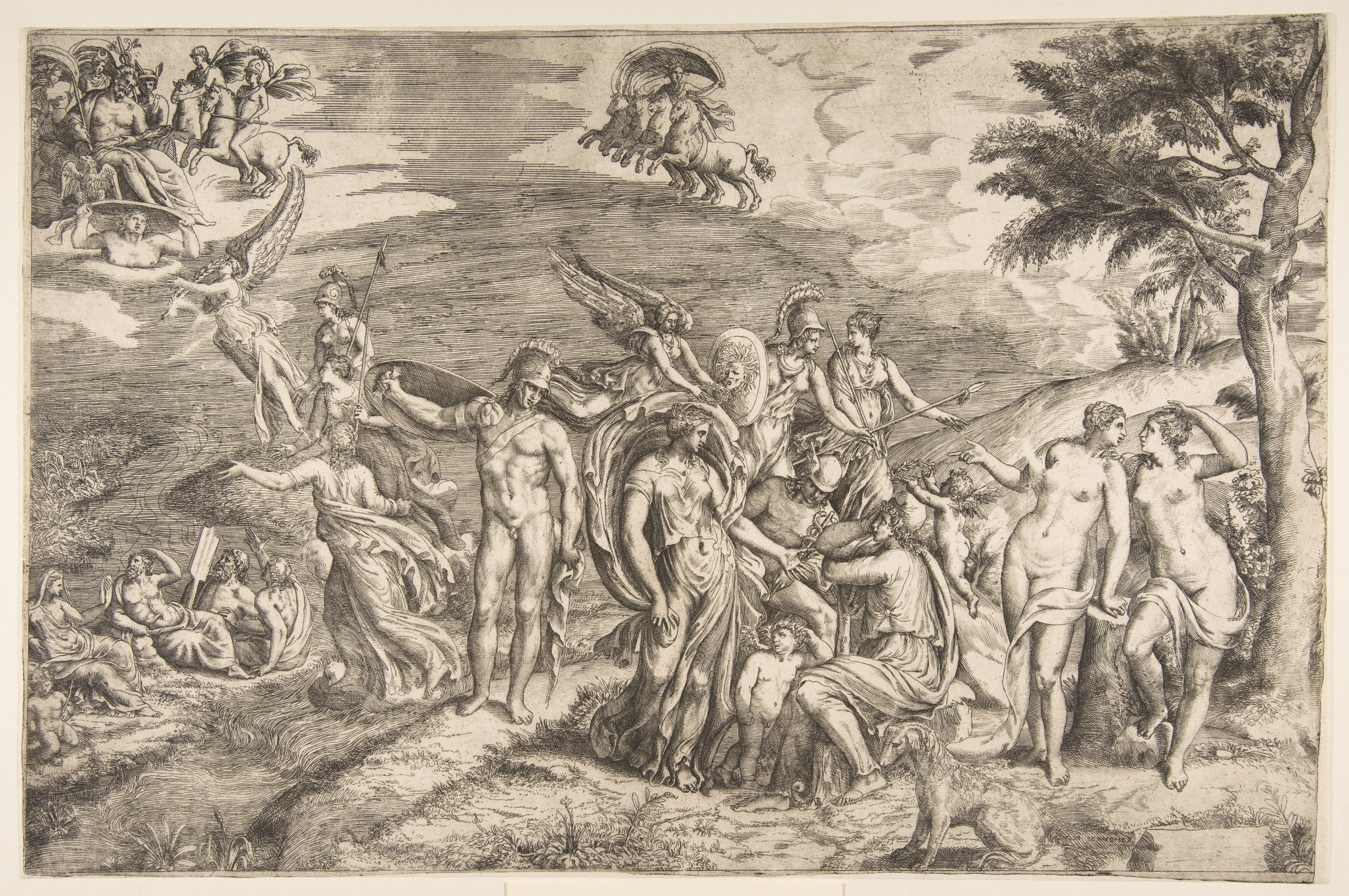
The Judgement of Paris by Giulio Bonasone after Raphael

==== The Judgement of Paris ====
As one of the best reproductive engravings of Giulio Bonasone, this print is believed to be taken directly from an original sarcophagus relief in the Villa Medici in Rome. The composition is closer to the original than to other drawings or engravings after the relief available to Giulio to study. When the original relief was broken on the left and upper part, Bonasone has attempted to complete the design by changing the spatial relationship. Moreover, in this engraving, Bonasone endowed the nudes with a sense of majesty. Edgar Wind noticed a "touch of archaeological flatness in incidental parts of the engraving", commented that "Mars is designed with extraordinary power as the figure dominating the composition. Indeed the character is so well conceived, in his insidious readiness to release disaster, looking back at Venus while going off to war, that one wonders whether Bonasone did not have some sketch by Raphael to work on."

Since no evidence suggests the possession by Bonasone of any sketch by Raphael, this engraving actually seems to be the best representation of Giulio's use of mixed media to demonstrate the co-existence of power and beauty. The adaptation from a relief to a painterly format is what makes this engraving the most successful among Bonasone's reproductive engravings.

While one could see that Giulio Bonasone employed different technique for the works of different artists, it is more likely that he changed his source as his technique developed. As his technique continuously advanced, he must have recognized the new areas of production opened and he would select paintings that best matched his skills. Bonasone made great endeavour to stay faithful to his sources and made few changes to the composition. He enjoyed greater liberty when he worked after the antique, since he often had to translate the sculptural medium into engraving.

A list of known works by Giulio Bonasone
Name	Category	Source	Year
Cardinal Pietro Bembo	Portrait	Titian	Unknown
Pope Marcellus II	Portrait	Original	Unknown
Philippus Hispaniarum princeps, Caroli V	Portrait	Original	Unknown
Raphael d'Urbino and Michelangelo Buonarroti	Portrait	Original	Unknown
Francisca Flori Antwerpiani inter Belgos pictoris	Portrait	Original	Unknown
Cardinal Niccolò Ardinghelli.	Portrait	Original	Unknown
Adam & Eve, Adam tilling & Eve spinning	Engraving	Original	Unknown
Holy Family	Engraving	Original	Unknown
Nativity	Engraving	Original	Unknown
Resurrection	Engraving	Original	Unknown
The Passion (29 plates)	Engraving	Original	Unknown
Life of the Virgin (13 plates)	Engraving	Original	Unknown
Adam & Eve driven from Paradise	Engraving	Amico Aspertini	Unknown
St. George	Engraving	Giulio Romano	Unknown
Holy family	Engraving	Giulio Romano	Unknown
Nativity	Engraving	Giulio Romano	Unknown
Solomon	Engraving	Sistine Chapel	Unknown
David	Engraving	Sistine Chapel	Unknown
Jesse	Engraving	Sistine Chapel	Unknown
Last Judgement	Engraving	Sistine Chapel	Unknown
Creation of Eve	Engraving	Sistine Chapel	Unknown
Judith with her Servant coming out of the Tent of Holofernes	Engraving	Parmigianino	Unknown
Miracle of the Manna	Engraving	Parmigianino	Unknown
Moses striking rock	Engraving	Parmigianino	Unknown
Nativity	Engraving	Parmigianino	Unknown
Shipwreck of Aeneas;	Engraving	Parmigianino	Unknown
Presentation of Virgin with Sts Joachim & Anne	Engraving	Perino del Vaga	1546
Sts Peter & John healing lame	Engraving	Perino del Vaga	Unknown
Virgin & child above St. Paul preaching	Engraving	Perino del Vaga	Unknown
Niobe & her Children	Engraving	Perino del Vaga	1541
Dead Christ seated on the Tomb	Engraving	Polidoro da Caravaggio	Unknown
Angels with Virgin Mary and St. John	Engraving	Polidoro da Caravaggio	Unknown
The Roman Charity	Engraving	Polidoro da Caravaggio	Unknown
St. Cecilia	Engraving	Raphael	Unknown
Christ meeting St. Peter	Engraving	Raphael	Unknown
St. Peter made Head of Church	Engraving	Raphael	Unknown
Noah coming out of Ark	Engraving	Raphael	Unknown
Joseph sold by his Brethren	Engraving	Raphael	Unknown
The cup found in Benjamin's sack	Engraving	Raphael	1532
Entombment of Christ with Virgin	Engraving	Raphael	Unknown
Rape of Europa and Venus attended by the Graces	Engraving	Raphael	Unknown
Alexander with Bucephalus and Roxana	Engraving	Original Design	Unknown
Apollo in his Car with Hours & Time walking on crutches	Engraving	Original Design	Unknown
Triumph of Cupid & Psyche	Engraving	Original Design	Unknown
Scipio	Engraving	Original Design	Unknown
Nativity of John the Baptist	Engraving	Pontormo	Unknown
Entombment of Christ	Engraving	Titian	Unknown
Twenty plates on the History of Juno	Engraving	Unknown	Unknown
The Fall of Phaeton	Engraving	Michelangelo	Unknown
Three female figures with Veils	Engraving	Michelangelo	Unknown
Mars and Venus and Achilles dragging body of Hector	Engraving	Primaticcio	Unknown
Sack of Troy	Engraving	Unknown	1545
Birth of Adonis	Engraving	Unknown	1586
A Triumph of Bacchus	Engraving	Illustrations	Early 1550s

== Art historian's perspectives ==
Despite the lack of documentation about Bonasone's life, historians have recognized and commented upon his art. Together with Rota, Ghisi, the Scultori and Caraglio, he was among the leading sixteenth-century engravers, and is mentioned in even the most general histories of engravings.

=== Giorgio Vasari ===
Giorgio Vasari mentioned Bonasone only in connection with his prints after Raphael, Giulio Romano, Parmigiaino and other artists from whom Bonasone could possibly get his inspirations. It might be explained by the theory that Vasari had believed that Bonasone worked out of Venice, since he discussed Venetian woodcuts after talking about Giulio's prints. Apparently, Vasari did not have a detailed understanding of Giulio Bonasone's work.

=== Carlo Cesare Malvasia ===
In the seventeenth century, Carlo Cesare Malvasia analyzed Bonasone's work in his writings. No additional documented information was provided after Malvasia's writings. His early summary of Bonasone's style was also definitive in many aspects. Though he considered Bonasone inferior to Raimondi, or even to Martino Rota and Agostino Veneziano, he still recommended him to his audience "for his knowledge of all the best manners; also the best works of the best masters; for his universal erudition; for the vast invention that we find in a;; his prints." He mentioned the letter of one of the members of Marini family to his agent Ciotti in which Marini asked the latter to get hime some "good old prints of Giulio Bonasone, Marc Antonion or other great masters..." He also quoted a letter from Count Fortunato which says "Use a little diligence to find some of the good prints of the able masters, such as Marc Antonio, Martino Rota, Giulio Bonasone, etc." These letters are evidence indicating the popularity of Bonasone's prints among collectors in the seventeenth century.

Malvasia also pointed out Bonasone's weaknesses: "Although often great in execution of the principal parts of a composition," he wrote, Bonasone showed his lesser aptitude in the landscapes and the trees "which it is impossible to see worse executed." The comments by other art historians of Malvasia's time also showed the same opinion.

Malvasia also analyzed Bonasone as a painter. He mentioned him with Lorenzo Sabbatini, who he considered to be Malvasia's teacher. Nonetheless, this relationship could not be backed up by analyzing the styles of Bonasone's paintings, which have all been lost. At the same time, Lorenzo Sabbatini was believed to live from 1530 to 1576 by most historians and therefore was not experienced enough to teach Bonasone. It is possible that Malvasia made a mistake about the relationship between the two artists but he still established the fact that Bonasone was a painter on top of his career as an engraver.

=== Adam von Bartsch ===
Bonasone was covered in Adam von Bartsch's comprehensive study of sixteenth-century Italian engraving. Cumberland, in a second edition, accused Bartsch of copying his earlier catalogue. However, a careful analysis of the two works would reveal enough differences to demonstrate that the two art historians probably compiled their catalogues independently. Bartsch was able to analyze dated work to show chronological progression in Bonasone's techniques. He also pointed out the weaknesses of Bonasone's skills which had been previously mentioned in Malvasia's and Cumberland's comments. Bartsch tried to find reasons for these shortcomings, and suggested that Bonasone's interest was in content and composition, not in technique. He wanted to be regarded more as an artist than a technician. Bartsch appeared to suggest than the influence of Bonasone on other artists was more significant than the value of Bonasone's prints themselves. Since Bonasone created many original prints and paintings, Bartsch regarded him as a "peintre-graveur".

=== Mary Pittaluga ===
Mary Pittaluga was the first twentieth-century art historian who conducted a valuable study of sixteenth-century Italian printmaking. She isolated the elements related to painting in Bonasone's works, for example, the contrast of light and shade. She thought Bonasone was a mediocre artist and gave credit to his original works.
