= List of world folk-epics =

World folk-epics are those epics which are not just literary masterpieces but also an integral part of the worldview of a people. They were originally oral literatures, which were later written down by either single author or several writers.

== African languages ==
- T'heydinn, a Mauritanian epic ensemble
- Gassire's Lute, a West African epic about the fall of the Ghana Empire
- Bayajidda, a West African epic
- Eri, a West African epic
- Oduduwa, a West African epic
- Silamaka, a West African epic
- Epic of Sundiata, a West African epic about the rise of the Mali Empire
- Lianja, a Central African epic
- Mwindo epic, a Central African epic
- Kebra Nagast, an Ethiopian epic
- Emperor Shaka the Great, a Zulu epic

== American languages ==
- Popol Vuh, a K'iche' epic
- Diné Bahaneʼ, a Navajo epic

== Southwest Asian and Eurasian languages ==
- Bahman-nameh, a Persian epic about the story of Bahman, son of Isfandyar
- Banu Goshasp-nama, a Persian epic about the daughter of Rustam
- Borzu Nama, is a Persian epic poem of about 65,000 couplets recounting the exploits and adventures of the legendary hero Borzu, son of Sohrab and grandson of Rostam
- Darab-nama, is a Persian prose romance, written by the 12th-century writer Abu Tahir Tarsusi, in which the adventures of the Kayanid Iranian King Darab are recounted
- Kush Nama, a Persian epic recounting the story of Kush the Tusked and Abtin.
- Faramarz-nama, a story about the Persian hero Faramarz
- The Garshasp-nama of Asadi Tusi, a Persian epic about the hero Garshasp
- Shahnameh, the national epic of Greater Iran and world's longest epic poetry written by one poet
- Shahriyarnameh, is an epic poem in Persian which relates the stories of Shahriyar son of Borzu son of Sohrab son of Rostam
- Samak-e Ayyar, Samak-e Ayyar is an epic ancient Persian romantic folklore story
- Nart saga, includes the stories and mythological epics and folklore of the Iranic Ossetian people
- Hamzanama, A long popular Islamic prose epic, which contains more than 42,000 pages in the Urdu language version
- Mem and Zin, a Kurdish folk and love epic
- Sirat Bani Hilal, an Arabic epic recounting the journeys and conquests of the Bani Hilal tribe
- Sirat Sayf ibn Dhi-Yazan, is a popular Arab romance about life of Sayf ibn Dhī Yazan
- One Thousand and One Nights, also known as "the Arabian Nights", is a collection of Middle Eastern folktales
- The Daredevils of Sassoun, an Armenian folk epic
- The Knight in the Panther's Skin, a Georgian epic poem
- Epic of Gilgamesh, the oldest epic of the world from Mesopotamia
- Enūma Eliš, The Babylonian creation epic from Mesopotamian literature
- The Hebrew Bible

== East and Central Asian languages ==
- Epic of King Gesar, a Tibetan epic
- Secret History of the Mongols
- The Tale of the Heike, a Japanese epic
- Jewang ungi, a Korean epic
- Irk Bitig, a book about Turkic legends from Dunhuang, China
- Alpamysh, a Turkic epic
- Kyz Zhibek, a Kazakh epic
- Alp Er Tunga, a Turkic epic
- Epic of Manas, a Kyrgyz epic
- Book of Dede Korkut (Korkut Ata), an Oghuz epic
- Oğuzname, an Oghuz epic
- Kutadgu Bilig, a Karakhanid epic
- Mupamipa, a Lahu epic
- Olonkho, a Yakut epic

== South Asian languages ==
- Khamba Thoibi Sheireng, a Meitei language epic poem, consisting of 39,000 lines, based on the story of Khamba and Thoibi, from India.
- Numit Kappa, a 1st-century Meitei language epic poetry from India.
- Meghnad Badh Kavya, a Bengali language epic from India by Michael Madhusudan Dutt.
- Mahabharata, a Sanskrit epic from India; known as Bharatayuddha in Indonesia and the longest epic in the world
- Ramayana, a Sanskrit epic from India.
- Panchatantra, a Sanskrit epic of animal folktales from India.
- Sarala Mahabharata, an Odia language epic, India
- Jagamohana Ramayana, an Odia language epic poem, India
- Five Great Epics of Tamil literature, India:
  - Cilappatikaram
  - Manimekalai
  - Cīvaka Cintāmaṇi
  - Valayapathi
  - Kundalakesi
- Mailaralingana in Kannada, India
- Manteswami Kavya, in Kannada, India
- Male Madeshvara, in Kannada, India
- Epic of Siri, in Tulu language from Karnataka, India
- Koti and Chennayya, in Tulu language, Karnataka, India

== Southeast Asian languages ==
- Sepha Khun Chang Khun Phaen, a Thai epic about the adventures of Khun Phaen, a Siamese folk hero.
- Klei khan Y Dam San, an epic of Rade people in Central Highlands (Tây Nguyên), Vietnam.
- Đẻ đất đẻ nước, an epic of Mường people in Northern Vietnam.
- Hikayat Hang Tuah, a Malaccan, and Malay epic
- Bidasari, a Malay epic
- La Galigo, also known as Sureq Galigo or La Galigo, is an epic creation myth of the Buginese people from South Sulawesi, Indonesia it is one of the longest epics in the world.
- Nagarakertagama, an Indonesian epic
- Ibong Adarna, a Spanish-era Tagalog epic
- Biag ni Lam-Ang (Life of Lam-Ang), an epic of the Ilocano of northern Luzon, the Philippines
- Ibalong Epic, a 60-stanza fragment of a Bicolano full-length folk epic of Bicol Region of the Philippines.
- Hinilawod, an epic of the Panay-Bukidnons of Panay, the Visayas, central Philippines.
- Darangen, an epic of the Maranao of Mindanao, the Philippines. Derived from the Ramayana

== European languages ==
=== Uralic languages ===
- Kalevala, a Finnish epic
- Kalevipoeg, an Estonian epic

=== Celtic languages ===
- Mabinogion, a compilation of Welsh myths and legends
- Matter of Britain, a compilation of Welsh myths and legends
- Mythological Cycle, a compilation of Irish myths and legends
- Ulster Cycle, a compilation of Irish myths and legends
- Fenian Cycle, a compilation of Irish myths and legends
- Cycles of the Kings, a compilation of Irish myths and legends
- Táin Bó Cúailnge, an Irish epic
- Caoineadh Airt Uí Laoghaire, an Irish lament

=== Germanic languages ===
- Volsunga saga, a Scandinavian saga
- Edda, a collection of Icelandic poems
- Njál's saga, an Icelandic saga
- Nibelungenlied, a German epic poem
- The Lion of Flanders, or the Battle of the Golden Spurs, a Flemish national epic
- Van den vos Reynaerde, the Middle Dutch collection of the cycle of fables around Reynard the Fox.
- Beowulf, an Anglo-Saxon epic written in Old English
- Le Morte d'Arthur, a collection of Arthurian legends in Middle English (note that Malory's epic is based on the Celtic Matter of Britain listed above)

=== Italic and Romance languages ===
- Aeneid, a Roman epic
- Os Lusíadas, a Portuguese literary epic
- La Araucana, an American Spanish epic
- The Legend of Thyl Ulenspiegel and Lamme Goedzak, a Belgian French epic
- The Lay of the Cid, a medieval Spanish epic
- The Song of Roland, a medieval French epic

=== Balto-Slavic languages ===
- The Tale of Igor's Campaign, an East Slavic epic
- Epic of the Forgotten, a Bulgarian poetic saga
- The Baptism on the Savica, a Slovene literary epic
- Judita, a Croatian epic
- On the Track of the Sun – The Red Warriors from Chorasmia, a Croatian epic
- The Mountain Wreath, a Montenegrin epic poem
- Lāčplēsis, a Latvian epic

=== Albanian language ===
- Cikli i Kreshnikëve, an Albanian epic

=== Greek language ===
- Iliad, an Ancient Greek epic
- Odyssey, an Ancient Greek epic
- Theogony, an Ancient Greek epic

=== Northeast Caucasian languages ===
- Sharvili, a Lezgin folk epic

== See also ==
- List of epic poems
- National epic
- National myth
- Founding myth
