= Space of gong culture =

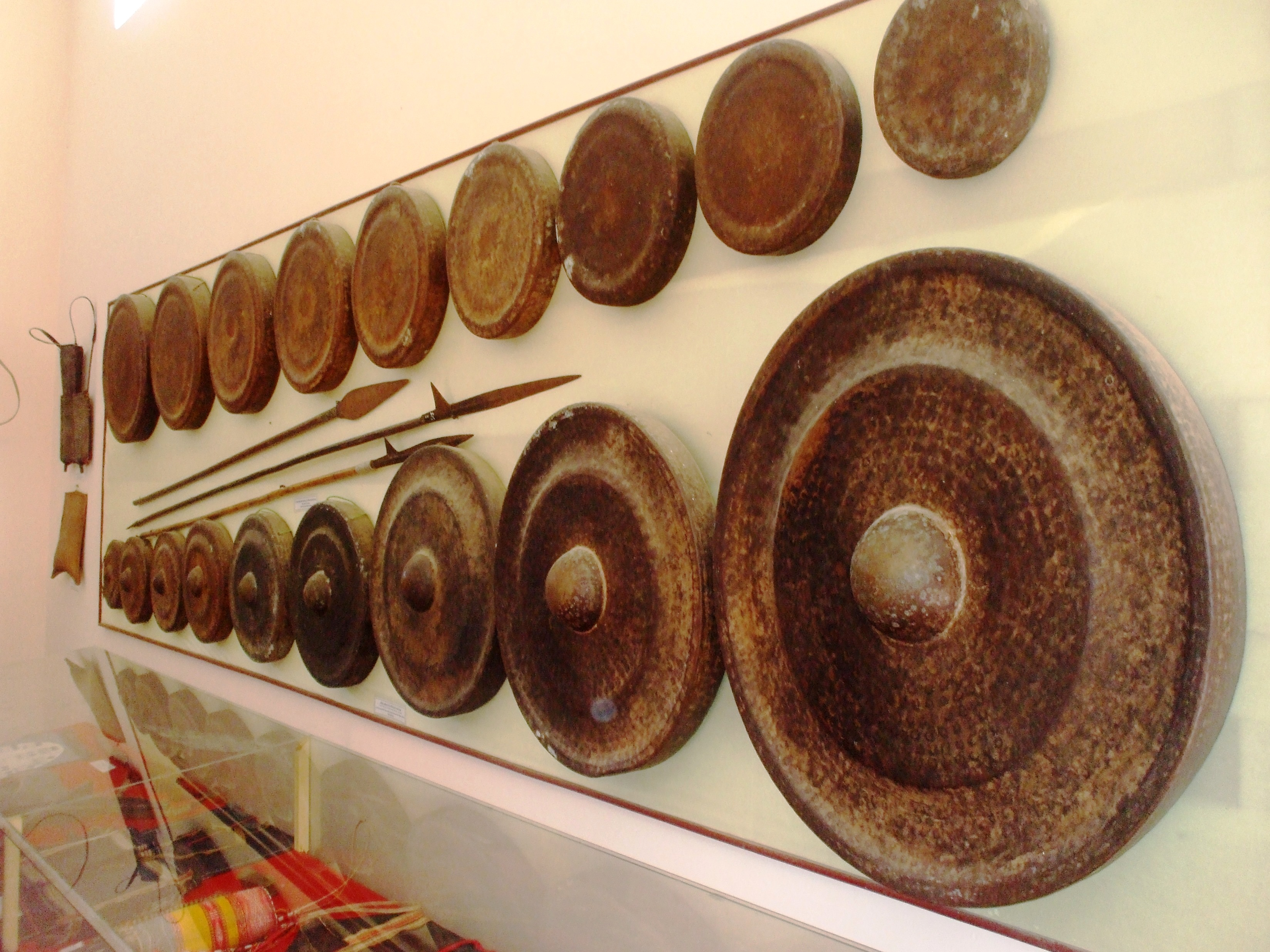
An array of gongs at Quang Trung Museum, Vietnam

The space of gong culture in the Vietnam Highlands (Vietnamese: Không gian văn hóa Cồng Chiêng Tây Nguyên) is an intangible cultural heritage of Vietnam's Central Highlands, home to "cultures which value gongs". It spans across the provinces of Quảng Ngãi, Gia Lai, Đắk Lắk, and Lâm Đồng — amongst ethnic groups such as the Rade, Jarai, Bahnar, Mạ, and Lạch (Koho). UNESCO recognized it as a Masterpiece of the Intangible Heritage of Humanity on the 25th of November, 2005.

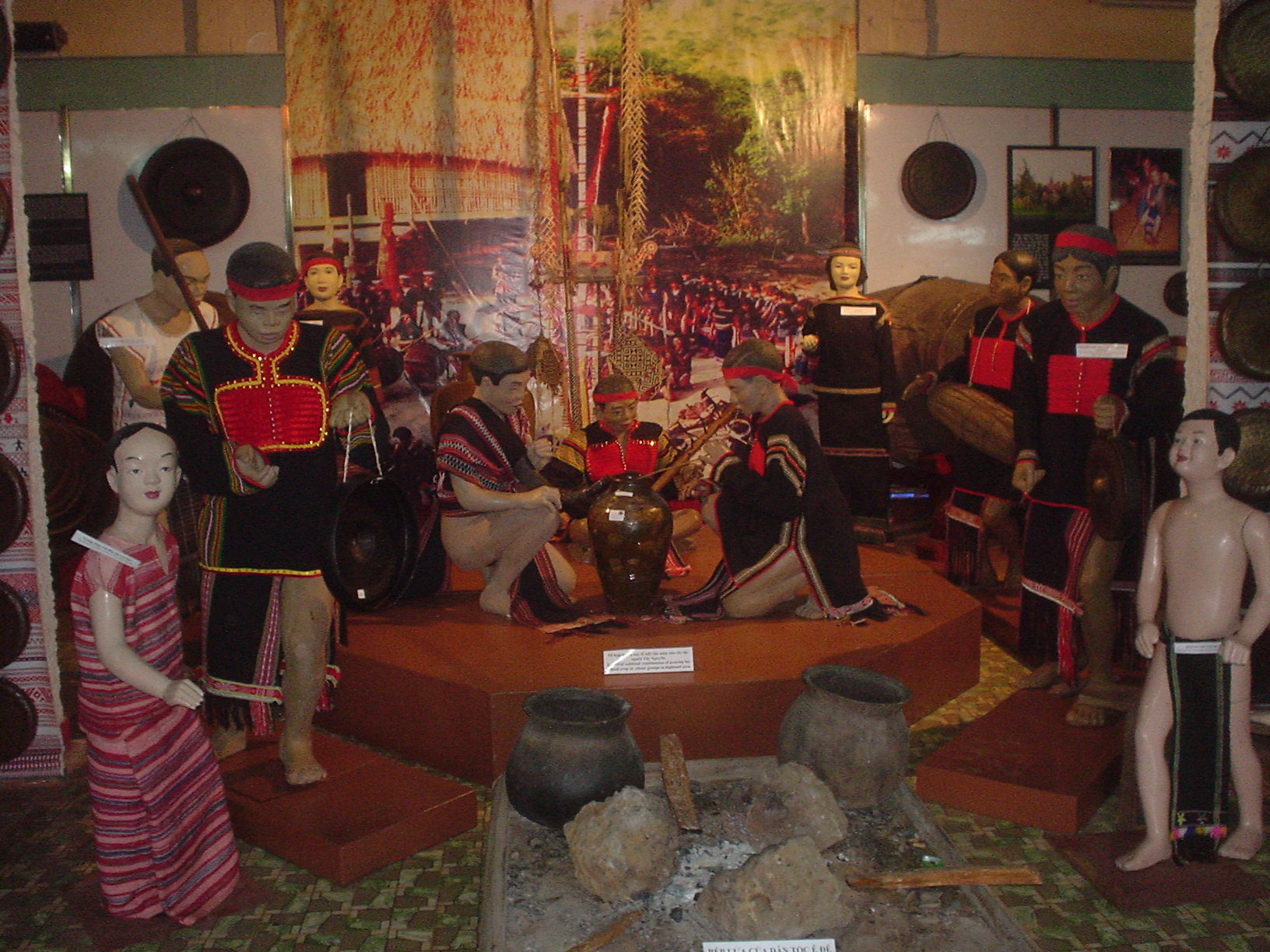
The use of gongs during a cultural event by the Rade, as depicted in the Đắk Lắk Museum of Vietnamese Ethnic Groups

The gong culture sees gongs as a privileged connection between men and the supernatural, where each gong houses a deity whose power corresponds to the gong's age. It has been strongly affected by economic and social transformations that disrupted the traditional transfer of knowledge and stripped the gongs of their spiritual significance.

The following components make up the space of gong culture: the use of gongs to make music, in certain festivals (e.g. the New Rice Festival, Water Wharf Ceremony, etc.), and the places where such festivals are held (e.g. longhouses, stilt houses / rông houses, gươl houses, a "water source" (bến nước), tombs, "nearby forests", etc.).

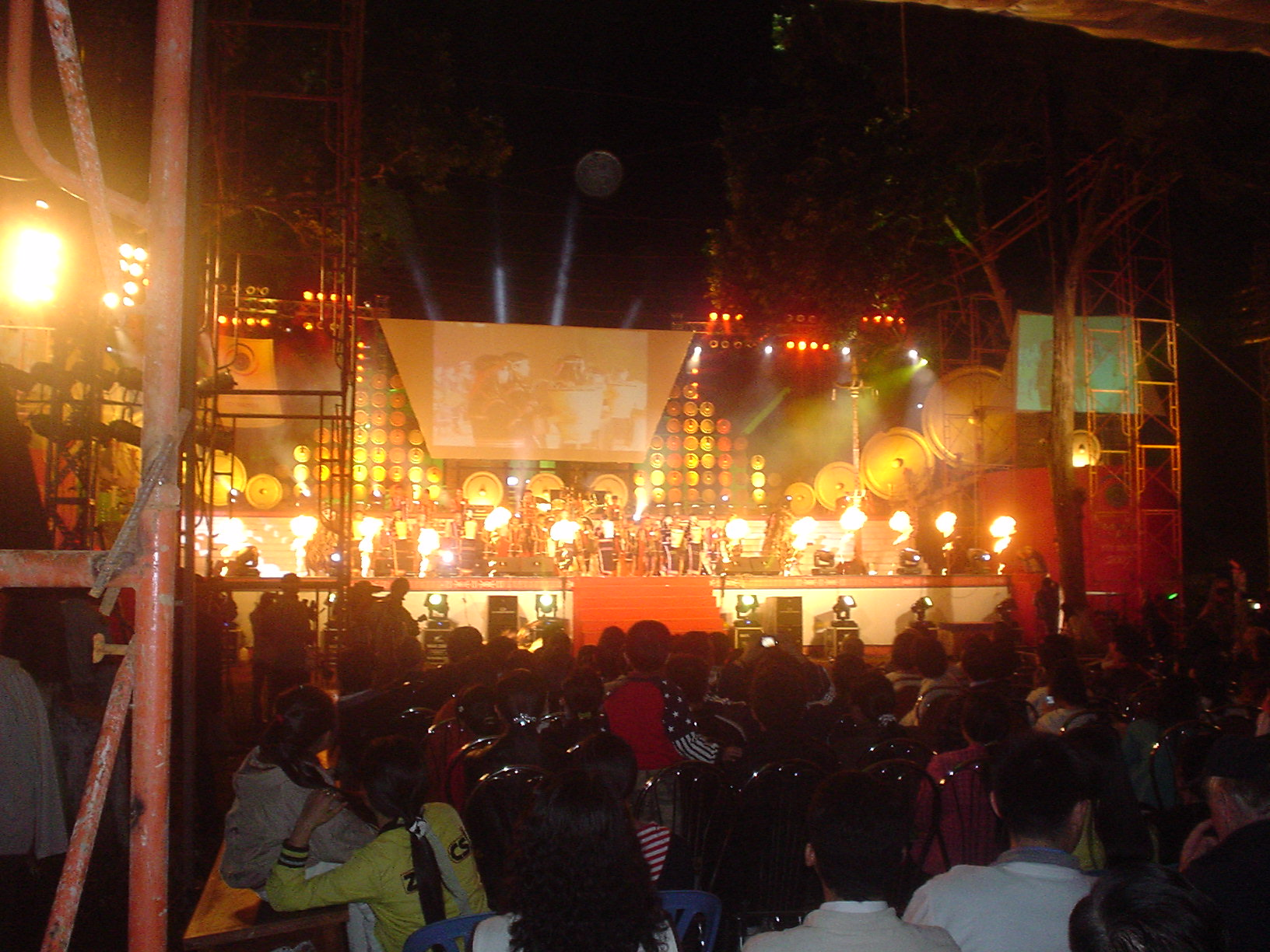
A gong festival hosted in Đắk Lắk, 2007

In the present day, the Gong Culture Festival is held annually across the Central Highlands, and is said to be "significant both as a means of cultural preservation and a popular tourist attraction".
