= Y Điêng =

- Born: 1 August 1928 (age 98)
- Occupation: Writer
- Writing career
- Pen name: Y Điêng Kpăhôp
- Language: Ê Đê, Vietnamese
- Period: 1959–present
- Genres: Fiction, ethnography
- Notable awards: Viet Nam State Prize for Literature and Art

Y Điêng (born 1928) is an Ê Đê author and ethnographer from Sông Hinh District, Phú Yên Province, Vietnam. As a young man he joined the fight against the French for independence and subsequently worked for the Voice of Vietnam in the late 1950s. His ethnographic works such as Truyên cô Ê-đê (E De Tales) chronicle the lives of the Ê Đê people during the war against the French and explore the social mores, beliefs and lifestyles of his native community. After making the transition from recording oral folk literature to writing works of fiction, these themes also were common in his short stories and novels. Y Điêng's novels were the first to be published bilingually in Ê Đê and Vietnamese. He has won three local writing competitions and was the first Ê Đê recipient of the Vietnam State Award for Literature and Art (2007).

== Works ==
- Em chờ bộ đội Awa Hồ (1962)
- Ông già Khơ Rao (1964)
- Như cánh chim Kway (1974)
- Hơ Giang (1978)
- Drai hlinh đi về phía sáng (1985)
- Truyên cô Ê-đê (1988)
- Chuyện trên bờ sông Hinh (1994)
