= Shahriyarnameh =

Persian epic poem

Shahriyarnameh (Persian: شهریارنامه) is an epic poem in Persian which relates the stories of Shahriyar son of Borzu son of Sohrab son of Rostam. The stories take place in Hend, Send and Sarandip. According to Zabihollah Safa, the author of this epic is Othman Mokhtari, but Abbas Eqbal Ashtiani, Parviz Natel-Khanlari and Jalaluddin Homai reject this theory. The story has survived in three incomplete manuscripts which differs considerably, but all of them relate the same story. The first manuscripts seems to be from 18th century and contains 180 papers. In this manuscript, the author mentions his name as "Farrokhi". The second manuscript is kept in Tajikistan and contains the most comprehensive version of the poem. The third manuscript contains 32 papers and is kept in Britain.

The poem is dedicated to the Ghaznavid ruler, Mas'ud III.
