= Epic of Silâmaka and Poullôri =

African epic

The epic of Silâmaka and Poullôri (or Silammaka and Puluru) is an African epic transmitted by oral tradition, mostly in the languages Fula and Bambara, and always accompanied with music. It relates the adventures of two heroes, Silâmaka and Poullôri, who are bound by friendship.

This epic is likely grounded on actual events, or at least historical characters, from late 18th or early 19th centuries, in the Fula chiefdoms of Macina ‒ then part of the Bamana kingdom of Ségou.

== Synopsis ==
The version of the Malian griot Marabal Samburu, transcribed by Lilyan Kesteloot in 1968, narrates the following main events.

Hammadi, a Fula chief, is a vassal of the king of the Bamana kingdom of Ségou, Da Monzon Diarra. Hammadi's son is Silâmaka, whose best friend is Poullôri, himself the son of Baba, Hammadi's domestic slave. At just forty days old, Silâmaka already shows exceptional endurance and bravery.

Silâmaka and Poullôri grow up. As an adult, Silâmaka is challenged by a woman to prove his temerity at the expense of Da Monzon himself. Silâmaka goes to consult a geomancer on a way to become invulnerable. He learns that, to do this, he must capture alive the sacred serpent galamani that prowls in the woods, in order to mark it with signs, surround it with leather and make a belt. Silâmaka goes into the forest mounted on his white horse, Soperekagne; and, with the help of Poullôri, he succeeds where many valiant warriors have failed: he captures the serpent and makes the belt. His fame spreads across the Fula villages.

The next episode pits Silâmaka against Hambodédio, a general allied with Da Monzon. Hambodédio insults Silâmaka's friend and the latter challenges him to single combat. Silâmaka is victorious; Hambodédio asks his forgiveness and the hero grants him his life.

The following year, when Da Monzon and his men come to collect tribute in the Fula villages, Silâmaka hides the villagers' gold and publicly insults Da Monzon. The latter sends his warriors against him, but they are all repelled. A warlord of Da Monzon, Fularadio, assaults Silâmaka and the latter must first retreat to his native village. But Silâmaka attacks again and, during a new battle which pits him against Fularadio and his five hundred horsemen, he kills Fularadio. Da Monzon sends other troops, who are massacred in vain. Silâmaka begins to doubt the validity of his actions and the deaths he has caused. He consults a soothsayer, who predicts that he will soon die a glorious death.

For his part, Da Monzon and his allies develop a powerful magic capable of defeating Silâmaka. Sensing his end approaching, Silâmaka sends Poullôri to Hambodédio to tell him that after his death, it will be his turn to reign. This is followed by the battle between Silâmaka and Da Monzon's troops. Finally, a young uncircumcised albino warrior manages to wound Silâmaka with an arrow dipped in the crushed bones of a black ox. Silâmaka dies of his wound. His body is brought back to his native village at the moment when Poullôri returns after having transmitted the message to Hambodédio. Poullôri mourns his deceased friend.

Da Monzon then attacks the village with new troops. Armed with his friend's enchanted lance, Poullôri flees on horseback with his sons and those of Silâmaka. He divides his pursuers into two groups, one that pursues him, the other that he chases in turn. When night falls, they all disappear, never to reappear: according to legend, they all went up to heaven.

After the disappearance of Silâmaka and Poullôri, Hambodédio takes charge of the region. He obtains from Da Monzon that the region of Macina, former domain of Silâmaka, is not reduced to captivity.

== Musical aspects ==
In the culture of the Fula, music plays a primordial role in the epic. The mâbo (griot) plays for each character a tune called the noddol (literally "the call") on his hoddu (instrument resembling a lute). The noddol is in a way the theme or the musical signature of an epic character, so that listeners who have already heard the themes can recognize which character is going to be discussed from the music even before the mâbo has mentioned it. Each epic has its own noddol that the mâbo plays at the beginning of the session to announce the story. In the epic of Silâmaka and Poullôri, there is practically no passage that is simply spoken, without being accompanied by music.

== Editions and translations ==
The first partial French translations of the epic were published by Gilbert Vieillard. In 1927, Vieillard listened to some episodes of the epic related by Gouro Ahmadou, a griot from Wouro-Guéladio in Niger, and he heard a second version in 1928 related by Samba Gaoulo Foûtanké. In 1931, he published an adaptation of Gouro Ahmadou's version.

In 1968, Amadou Hampaté Bâ collected a long excerpt from the epic from the griot Mâbal Sambourou in the region of Macina in Mali and Lilyan Kesteloot published the translation in the journal L'Homme the same year.

In 1972, Christiane Seydou published the translation of two episodes of the epic: the revolt of Silâmaka against Amirou, chief of Sâ, and the theft of the oxen of Amirou Goundaka (also called Hambodêdio). This version published by Seydou was related to him by the griot Boubâcar Tinguidji (sometimes spelled Tinguedji). The book comes with recordings showing the speech and music of the epic, and stored on three 45 rpm floppy vinyl disks inserted in the book. These excerpts were digitized in the 2010s by the Centre de recherche en ethnomusicologie, and made available on its online archive.

In 1977, Yero Dooro Jallo published a version of the epic in Fula, Silaamaka e Pullooru.

== Analysis ==
The epic of Silâmaka and Poullôri contains many marvelous or hyperbolic episodes, but largely refers to a real historical context: the struggle of the Fulani chiefs to shake off the yoke of the Bamana kingdom at the end of the 17th and the beginning of the 18th century. At that time, each ardo (traditional Fulani chief) owed allegiance to the Bambara king of Ségou and paid him each year the dissongo, or "honey price", a tax that could amount to several kilos of gold that was used to fund the preparation of mead, a drink highly prized by Bambara chiefs and notables. Unpopular, this tax sparked several revolts under the reign of Ngolo Diara in the second half of the 18th century.

Maurice Delafosse indicates in his genealogy collected from the griots of the Diallo clan that Silâmaka whose name means "the saber", would be the son of Aissa and Hamadi Dikko called Gourori, Ardo of the Diallo clan who reigned from 1801 to 1810 over the Macina and who was deposed in 1810 by Seku Amadu of the Bari clan. Born between the end of the 18th century and the beginning of the 19th century, Silâmaka could not be identified with a historical figure, but he appears as the symbol of the pride and honor of the Fula in the face of the combined effects of the Bambara domination of the time and the fratricidal war launched against the animist Fula of Macina by Seku Amadu. The warrior couple formed by Silâmaka and Poullôri, united by bonds of virile friendship and honor, recalls the pairs of heroes of European epics like Roland and Olivier in the song of Roland.
