= Rade people =

Austronesian ethnic group of southern Vietnam

Rhade
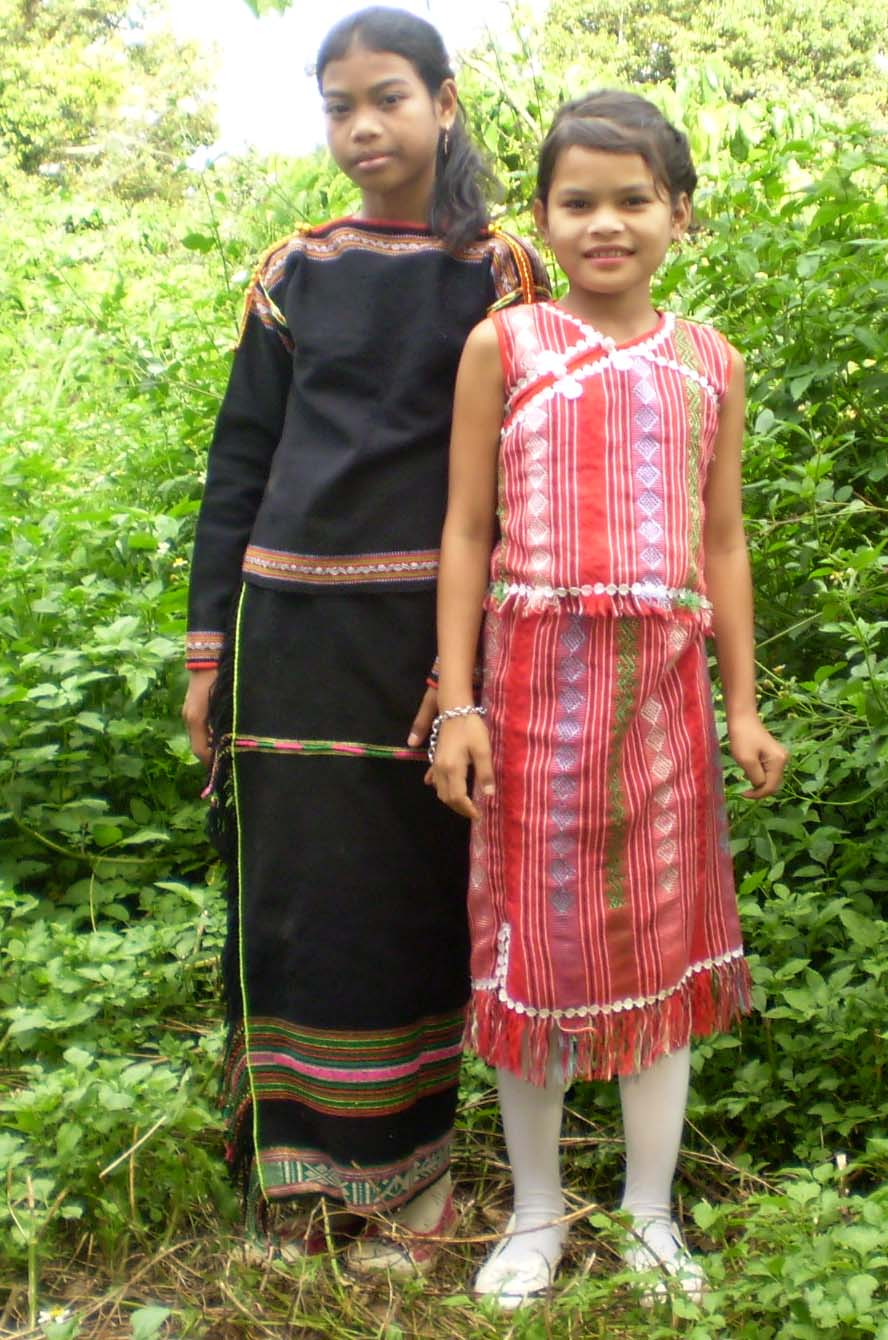
- Rade girls in folk costume

Total population
- 398,671 (2019)

Regions with significant populations
- Vietnam, Cambodia

Languages
- Rade • Vietnamese

Religion
- Animism • Christianity

Related ethnic groups
- Jarai, Chams, Utsuls, Bahnar

The Rhade or Êđê (Rade language: Rang De) are an indigenous Austronesian ethnic group of southern Vietnam (population 398,671 in 2019).

== Language ==
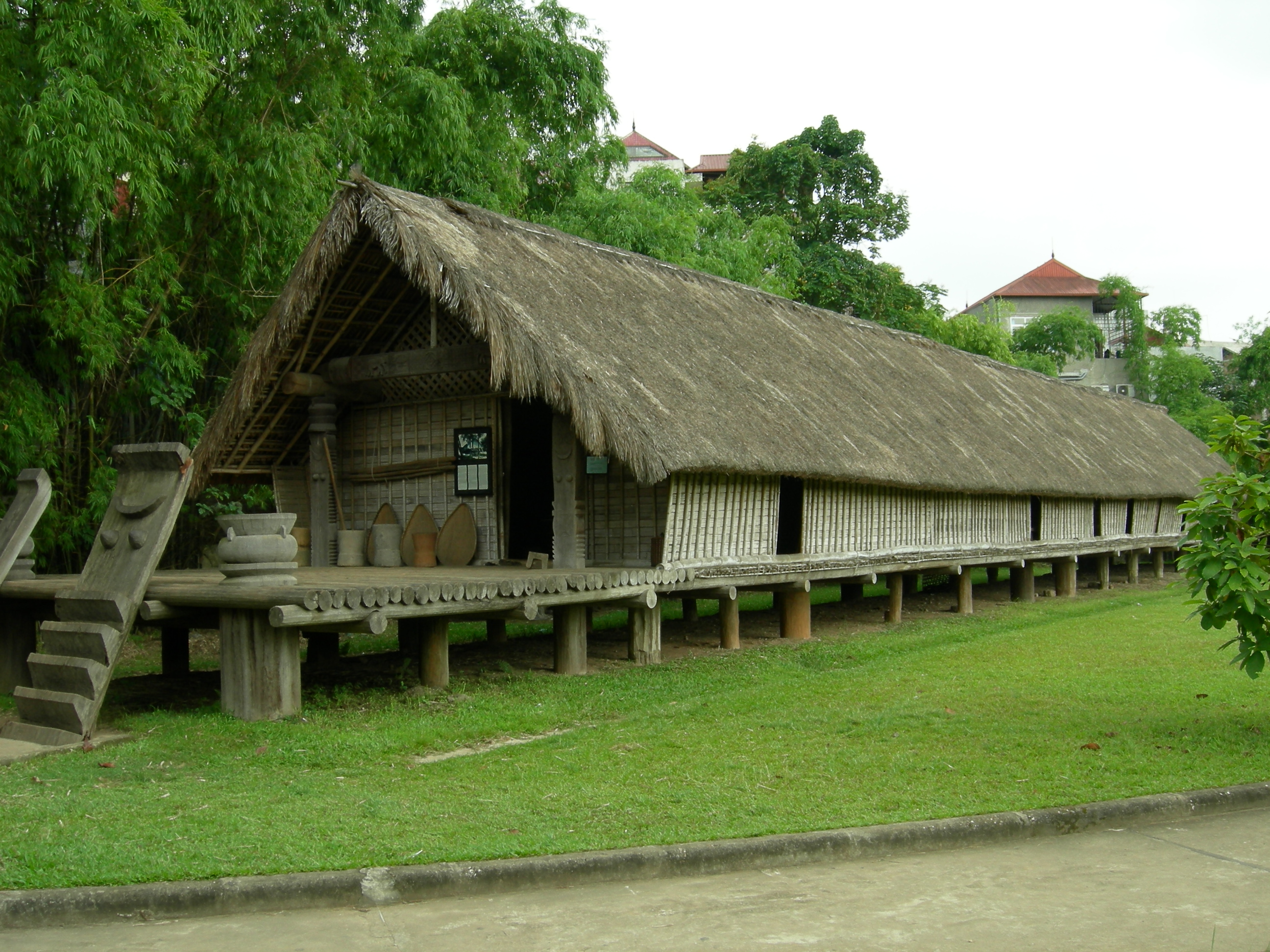
A Rade longhouse.

The Rade language is one of the Chamic languages, a subfamily of the Malayo-Polynesian branch of the Austronesian language family. Other Chamic languages are spoken in central Vietnam and in Aceh, Sumatra.

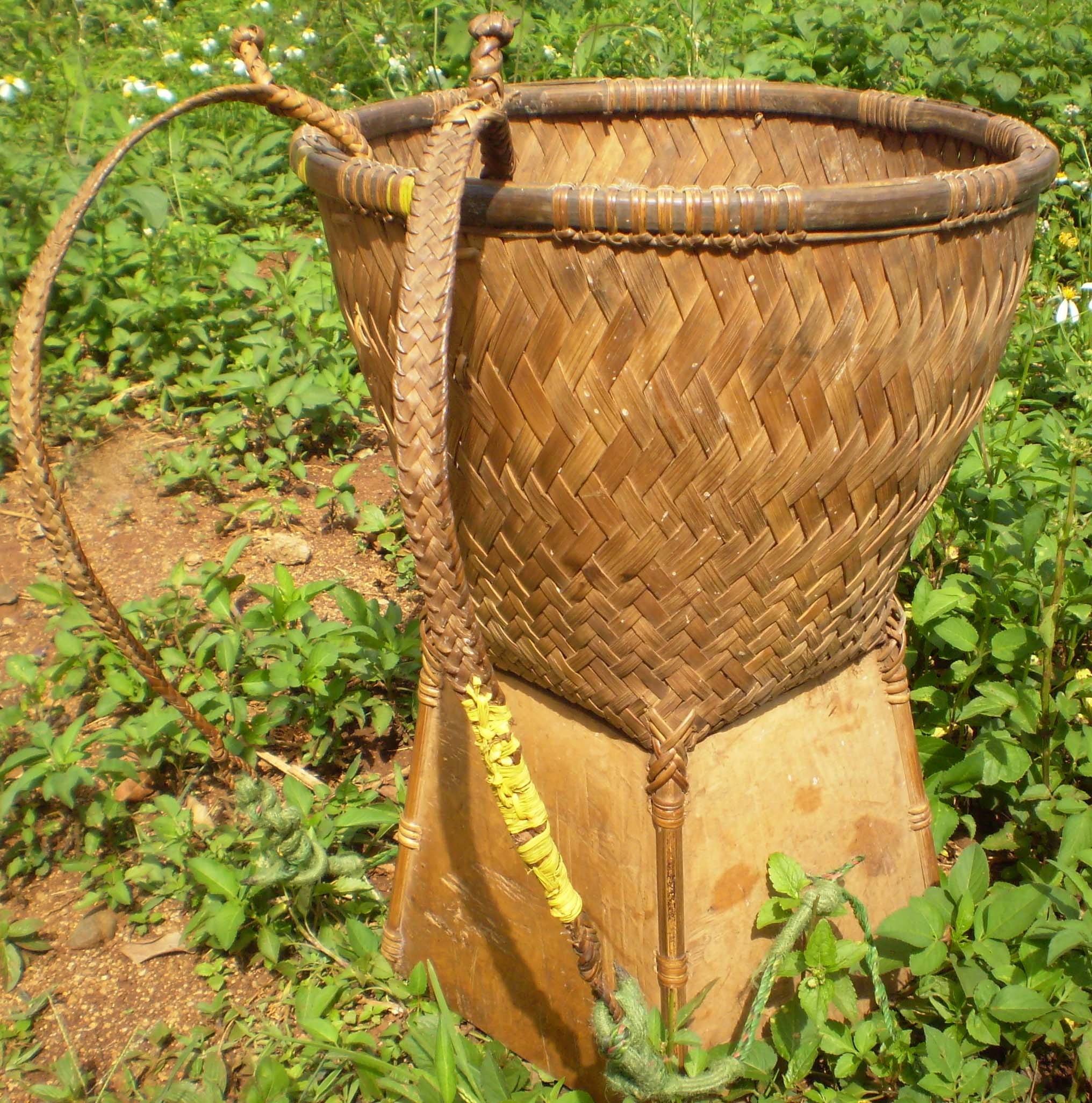
A kind of Austroasiatic carrying bag, created by mythological character Y Rit and has a form of pơ lang flower's sepal.

== Naming of people ==
Like other Austronesian ethnic groups in the Central Highlands, the Rade have unique prefixes to mark their gender. Female names are always marked with the prefix H'. For example, the beauty pageant winner H'Hen Niê and her mother H'Ngơn Niê both have their names prefixed with H'. Masculine names are prefixed with Y-, such as the late government official Y-Ngông Niê Kdăm. Translators of the Rade evangelical Bible incorporated this cultural practice for most Middle Eastern and European characters (H'Mari "Mary," H'Rut "Ruth," H'Prisil "Priscilla," Y-Yôsep "Joseph," Y-Yakôp "Jacob," Y-Julius, etc.), with a few exceptions such as Yêhôwa ("Jehovah"), Yêsu ("Jesus"), Hêrôt ("Herod"), etc. Rade's more sophisticated phonology allows for more accurate transcriptions of these Hebrew names and consequently, more normalized adoption among Rade evangelical Protestants, as opposed to Vietnamese ones.

Unlike in Vietnamese, given names precede surnames in Rade. The two most common surnames are Niê and Mlô. A girl may be named something like H'Mari Niê, with H' being the feminine prefix, Mari being the true given name, and Niê being the surname. There are also derived compound surnames such as Niê Siêng, Niê Kdăm, Mlô Dun Du, etc. and toponymic surnames like Buôn Yă. Surnames are passed down matrilineally.

== Kinship and social structure ==
The Rade practice matrilineal descent. Descent is traced through the female line, and family property is held and inherited by women. The basic kinship unit is the matrilineage, and these basic kinship units are grouped into higher-level matrilineal sibs (matrisibs). The Rade are further divided into two phratries.

The women of a matrilineage and their spouses and children live together in a longhouse. The lineage holds corporate property such as paddy land, cattle, gongs, and jars; these are held by the senior female of the matrilineage. The lineage also engages in the farming of common lands and maintenance of the longhouse. The head of the longhouse itself is a man, with the position most commonly inherited by the spouse of the daughter or sister-in-law of the previous longhouse head.

Matrilineages and matrisibs are exogamous, with both sexual intercourse and intermarriage prohibited. The phratries also impose some restrictions on marriage. Couples violating these restrictions must sacrifice a buffalo, though violating phratry restrictions is generally not seen as being as serious, and requires only the sacrifice of a pig. Residence is matrilocal.

Rade villages were traditionally autonomous and governed by an oligarchy of leading families. Some villages became locally dominant, but none formed any larger political structures.

Êđê society has retained some elements of primitive communism. This can be observed in the custom of H'rim zít. Whenever a new house is being built in the village, all villagers help the family in constructing their abode on the basis of mutual aid; villagers assist each other either by collecting construction materials or helping with manual labour.

The inauguration of the new home takes place when a row of trees is planted along the wall. However, people may move in before this. Women, led by a female head of the matrilineal family, are the first ones authorised to walk on the new floor. They carry water and fire to give coolness and heat to the new home.

== Literature ==
=== Epic ===
Epics (Rade language: klei khan), such as Klei khan Y Dam San, H'Bia Mlin, Dam Kteh Mlan, Mdrong Dam, etc. are told by epic tellers (Rade language: po khan) next to the fire, through the night.

== Music ==
Êdê music is very diverse and playing music is the way that Êdê people communicate to both other people, and according to their beliefs, God (Êdê language: yang).

=== Musical instruments ===
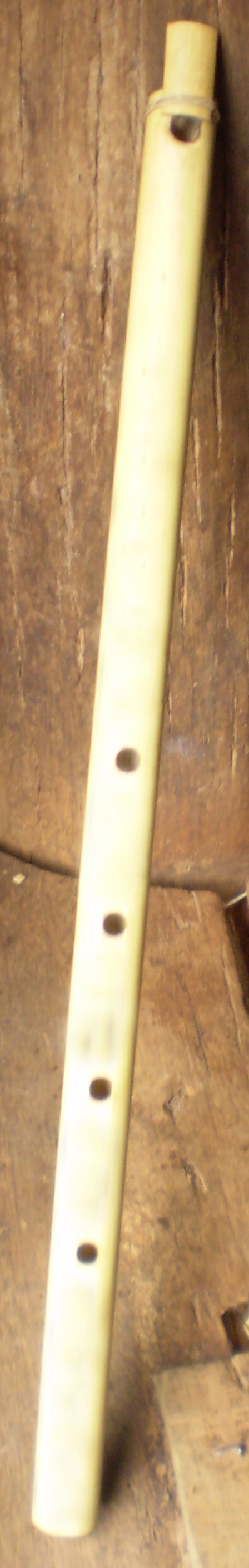
The Đinh vuốt, a vertical flute used by the Rade people

- Gong: There are several sets of gongs used. The knah gong set is made up of six suspended gongs :knah, hlinang or knah hliang, mdu khơk or knah khơk, hluê khơk or mong, hluê hliang, hluê khơk điêt or k'khiêt, knah di, and the largest one is ching sar; as well as two bossed gongs: mđũ and ana (there is also h'gor drum). The others are: chinh k'ram. Rade gong culture has been recognized by UNESCO as one of the Masterpieces of the Oral and Intangible Heritage of Humanity.
- Flute (Êdê language: đing): đing năm, ky pah, đing tak ta (or đing buốt klé), đing buốt tút, đing buốt trok, đing rinh, đing téc, đinh tút.
- String instrument: brố or brok zither, goong.
- Others: chinh đing aráp, gông kram, đing pah, đing ktuk, đing pâng, kni.

=== Style of music ===
- Kư- ứt: a kind of telling the epic accompanied with đing buốt trok.
- Ayray: a kind of love songs accompanied with đing năm.

== Architecture ==
A typical house of Rade people is the longhouse made of bamboo and wood. The longhouse's length is measured by the number of collar beams (Rade language: de). Once a girl living in the house gets married, the house is lengthened by one compartment, as the matrilocal aspect of Rade marriage means that the husband will live in his wife's house. The orientation of buildings are North-South.

The longhouse's space is divided into two parts: Gah part's area makes up 1/3- 2/3 the total area is considered as the living room and the other part includes bedrooms. There are two doors: the front door is for men, the back door is for women and two stairs: male stair and female stair.

Longhouses can be 100 meters long and house from three to nine families. A traditional description of the size of the longhouse is: "The house is as long as the gong's echo".

== Vietnam War ==
During the Vietnam War, the Rhade had many involvements, but their most notable was serving with U.S Special forces. The Rhade would be "recruited" from their villages, and sent to work off with various different units (most of them Green Beret affiliated) such as MIKE forces, or MACV-SOG While in these units, the Rhade provided manpower, but also their wisdom of the local terrain, and skills they had from being oriented with the environment. Like all of the Montagnards serving in the war, translation was an important skill they offered, so they could recruit and gain the trust of more Rhade villages.

According to William Duiker, United States Foreign Officer and East-Asian professor, the training efforts, called "Civilian Irregular Defense Groups" (CIDG), were plagued with problems of arbitrary authority on the part of Vietnamese authorities and officers. During the summer of 1964, "...Vietnamese arrogance led immediately to problems, and in September a serious revolt broke out among the Rhadé [sic] tribesmen in Ban Me Thout[sic]. Only with the aid of U.S. advisers was the crisis defused."

The Rade made up a portion of the United States' Montagnard allies, and after the war some fled to the United States, mainly residing in North Carolina.

== Notable Rade people ==
- Y Thanh Hà Niê Kđăm, politician and party secretary of Lâm Đồng province
- Y Bham Enuol, leader of FULRO
- Y Điêng, writer and ethnologist
- H'Hen Niê, Miss Universe Vietnam 2017, Miss Universe 2018 Top 5
- Y Êli Niê, goalkeeper
- Êban Y Phu, politician
- Y Quynh Bđăp, human rights activist and alleged organizer of the 2023 Đắk Lắk attacks

== Gallery ==
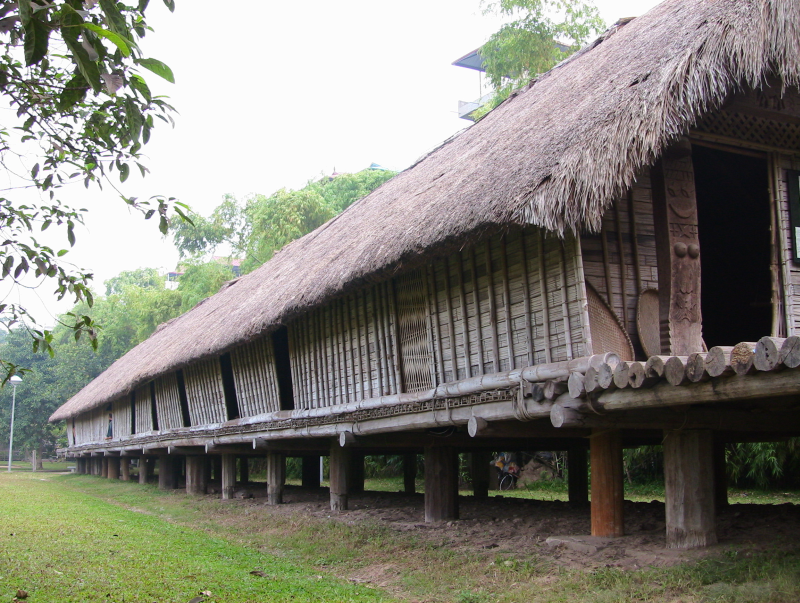
Rade long house

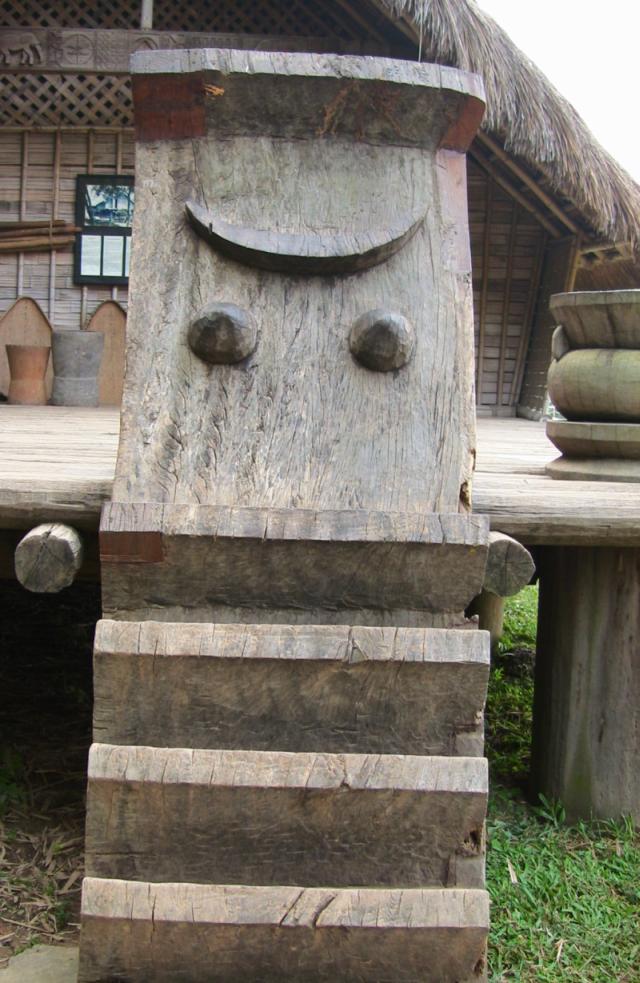
A stair

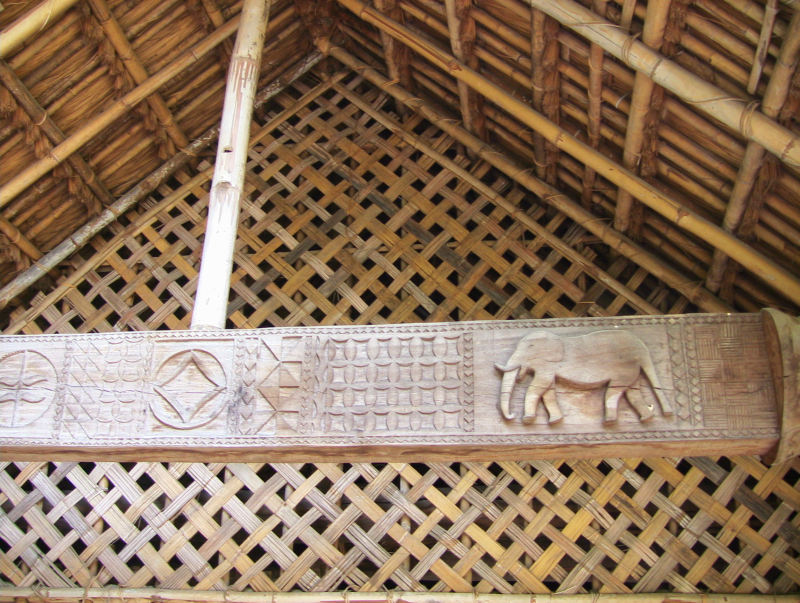
A decorated girder

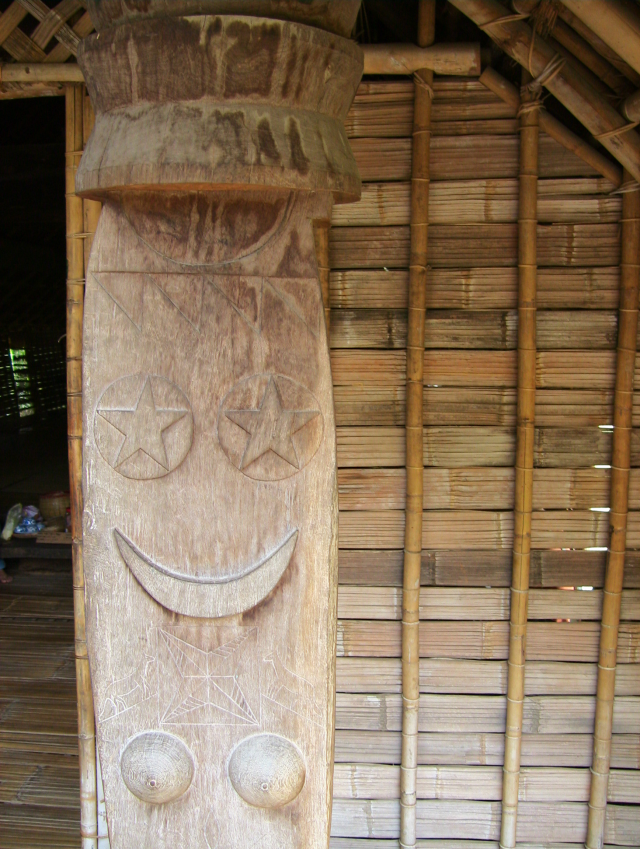
A column with images of stars, crescent moon, and breasts

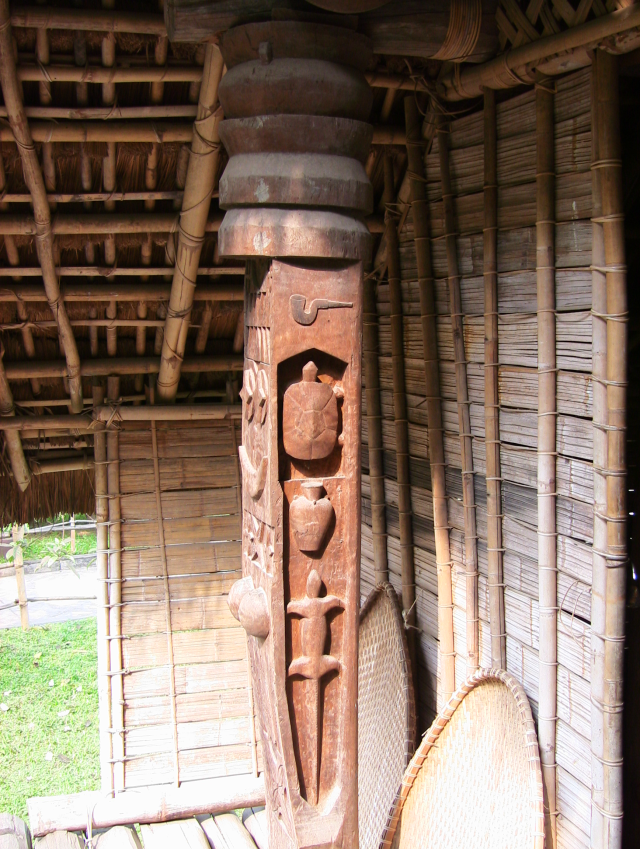
Images of tortoise, iguana, wine jar, tobacco pipe in a column

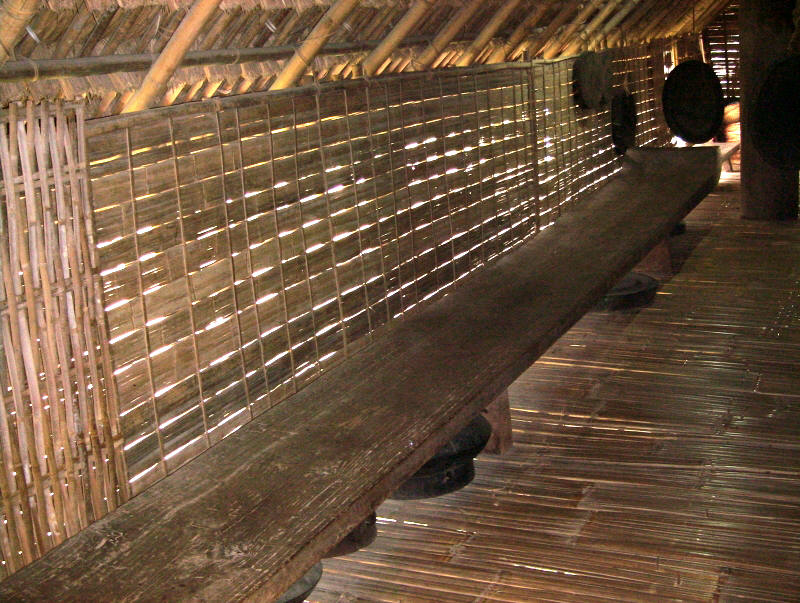
Bamboo wall and floor and a wood bench in the long house

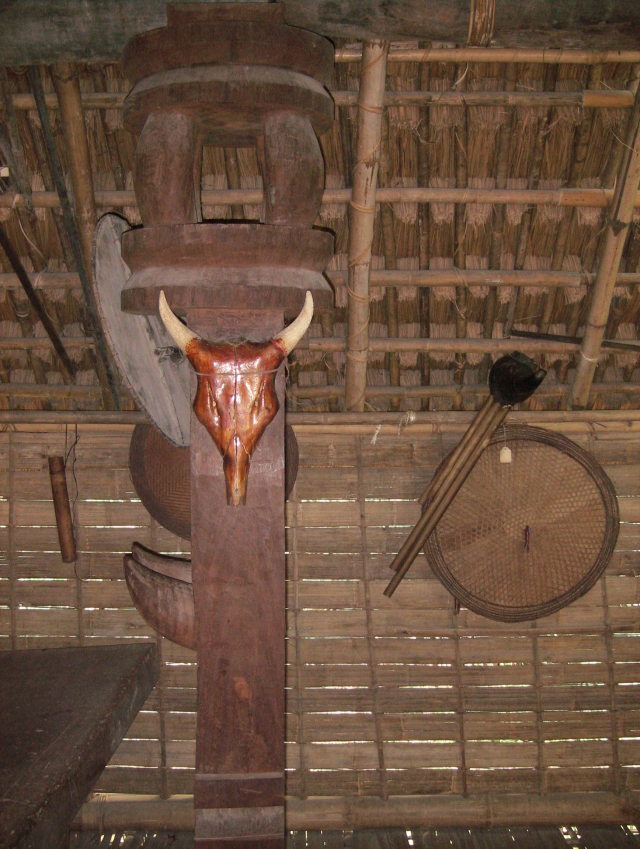
A column with images of rhino horns, a hag head, and a ding nam.

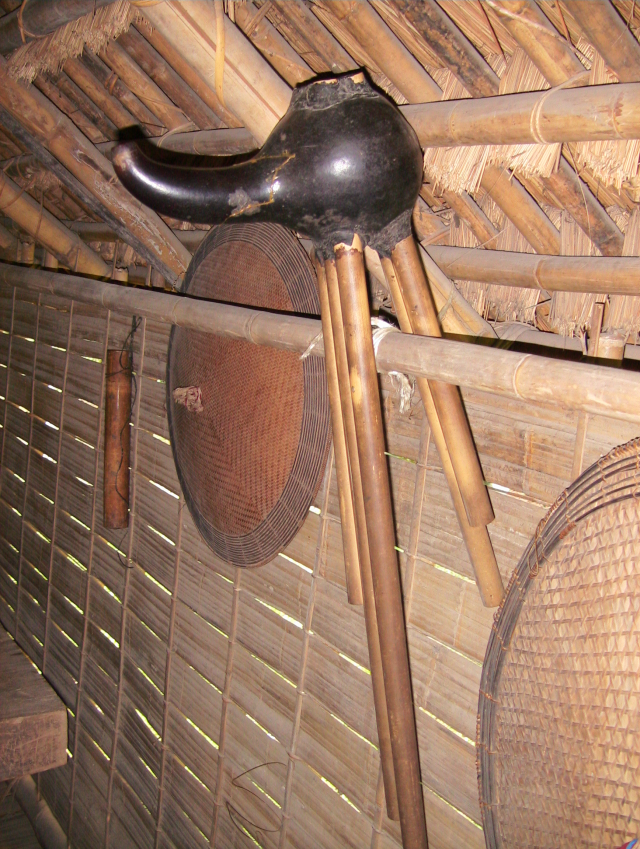
A ding nam is hung on the wall

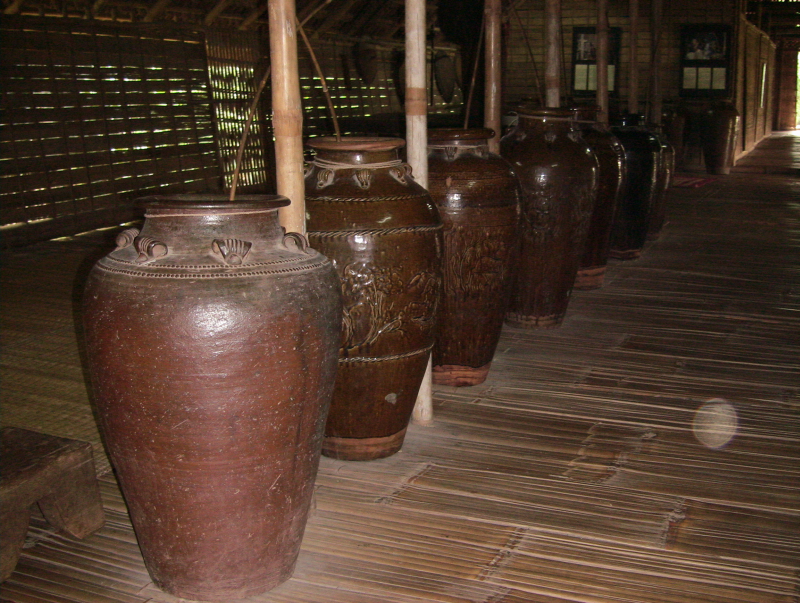
Jars of wine

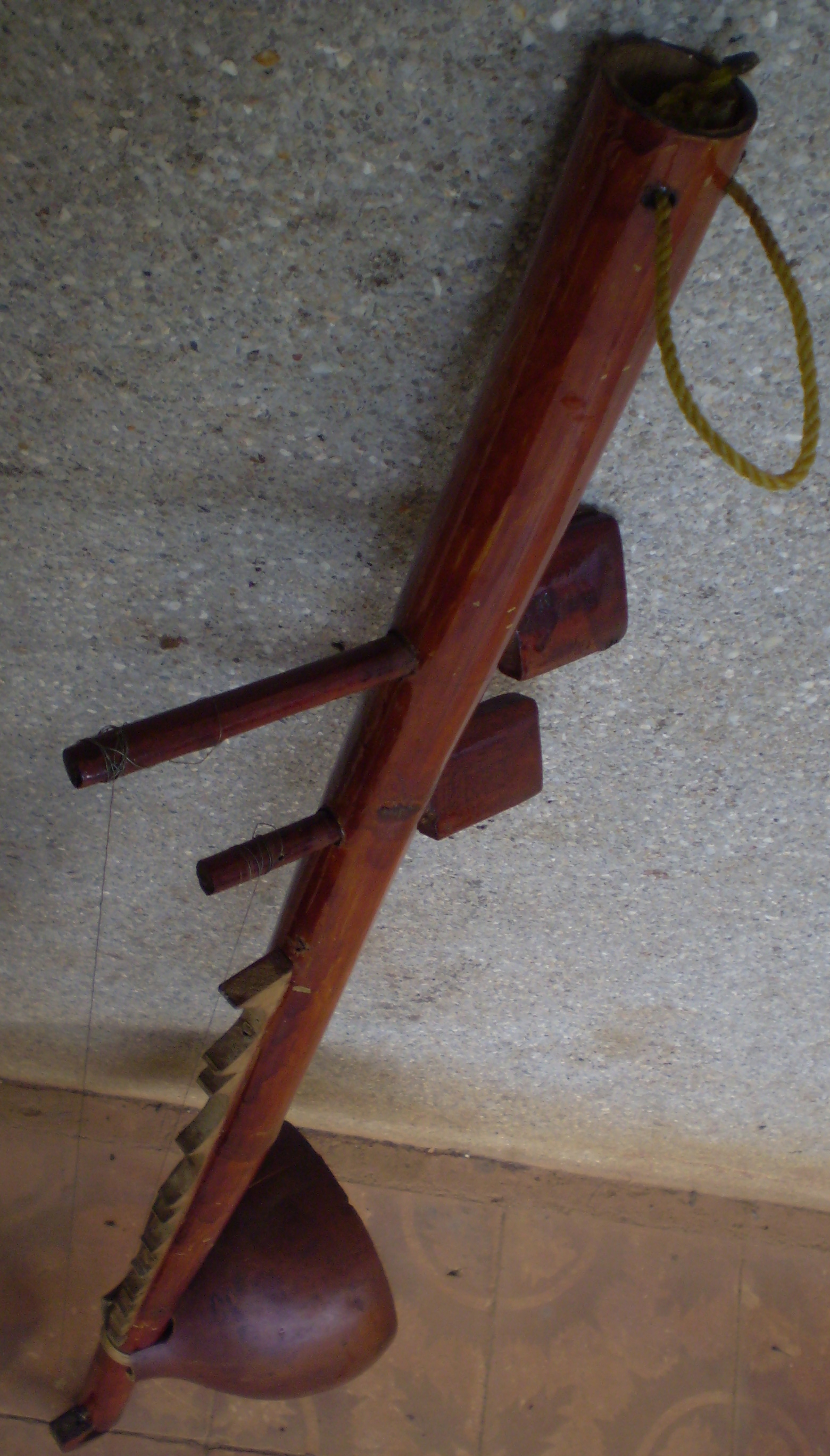
Musical instrument Bro of Êdê people

== Customary law ==
L. Sabatier has collected 236 articles. The highest number of articles is of marriage and family matters, followed by property ownership and relationship between the heads of villages and villagers. The main principles are that communal nature and equality are under guarantee. Judges are called khoa phat kdi.
