= Darab-nama =

12th-century Persian prose romance by Abu Tahir Tarsusi

The Darab-nama (Persian: داراب‌نامه, lit. 'Book of Daaraab') is a Persian prose romance, written by the 12th-century writer Abu Tahir Tarsusi, in which the adventures of the Kayanid Iranian King Darab are recounted.

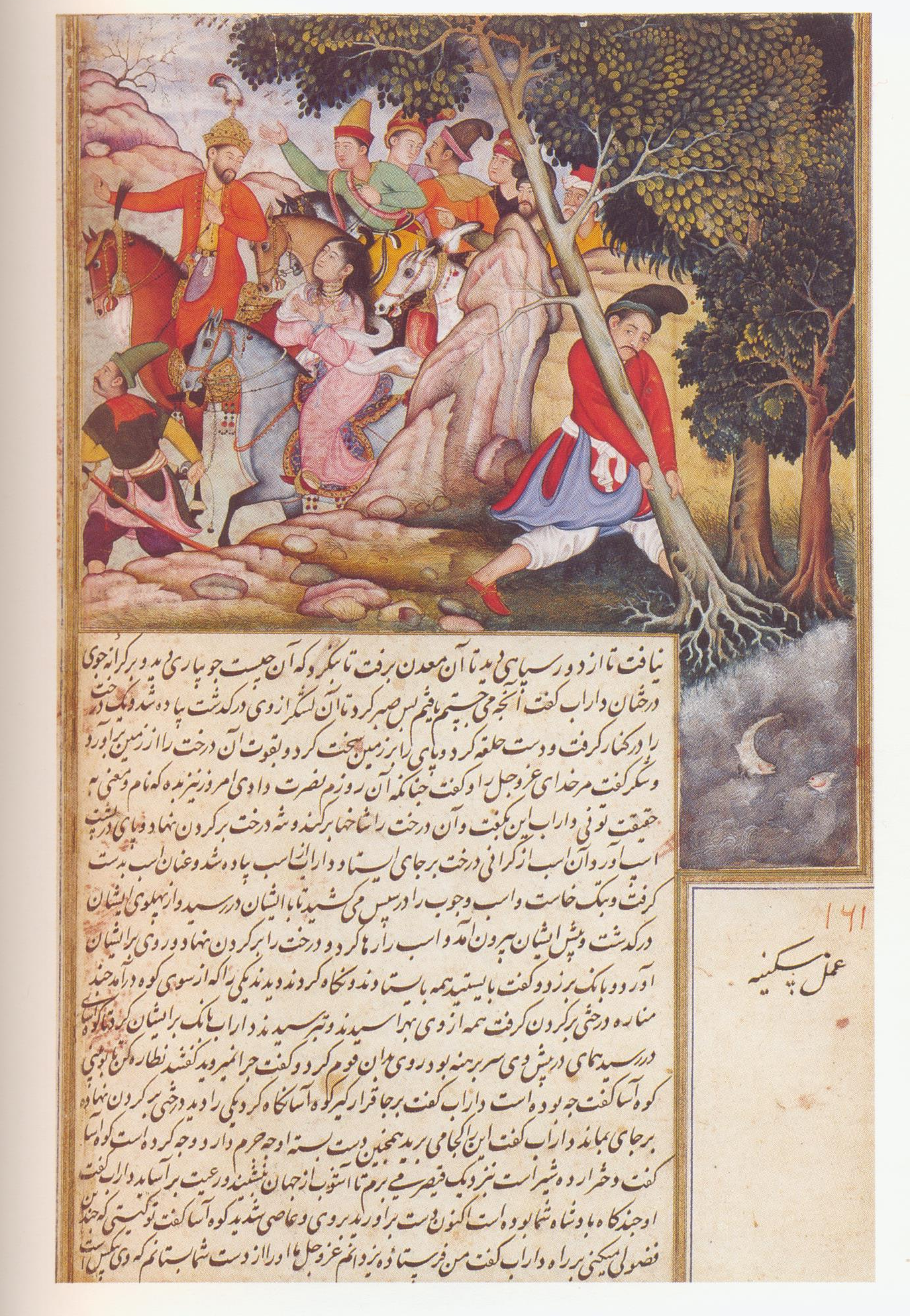
Darab uproots a tree to use it as a weapon. Manuscript made for Akbar, c. 1585.

== Author ==
Not much is known about the author. His full name is given as Abu Taher Mohammad ben Hasan ben 'Ali ben Musa Tarsusi (or Tartusi).

== Story ==
The story, written in prose, is about the adventures of the legendary king Darab, the son of Bahman, and Homay. Homay is the daughter of king Sam Čarash of Egypt and gives birth to Darab, but he sets him afloat in a box on the Euphrates. By the age of 13, Darab had already proven his power and youth. He is told by the launderer that he was a foundling and sets out to find his true parents. Finally, he meets his mother and they are reconciled. However, it was not yet time for Darab to assume the throne, so he sets off on series of adventures in the land and sea.

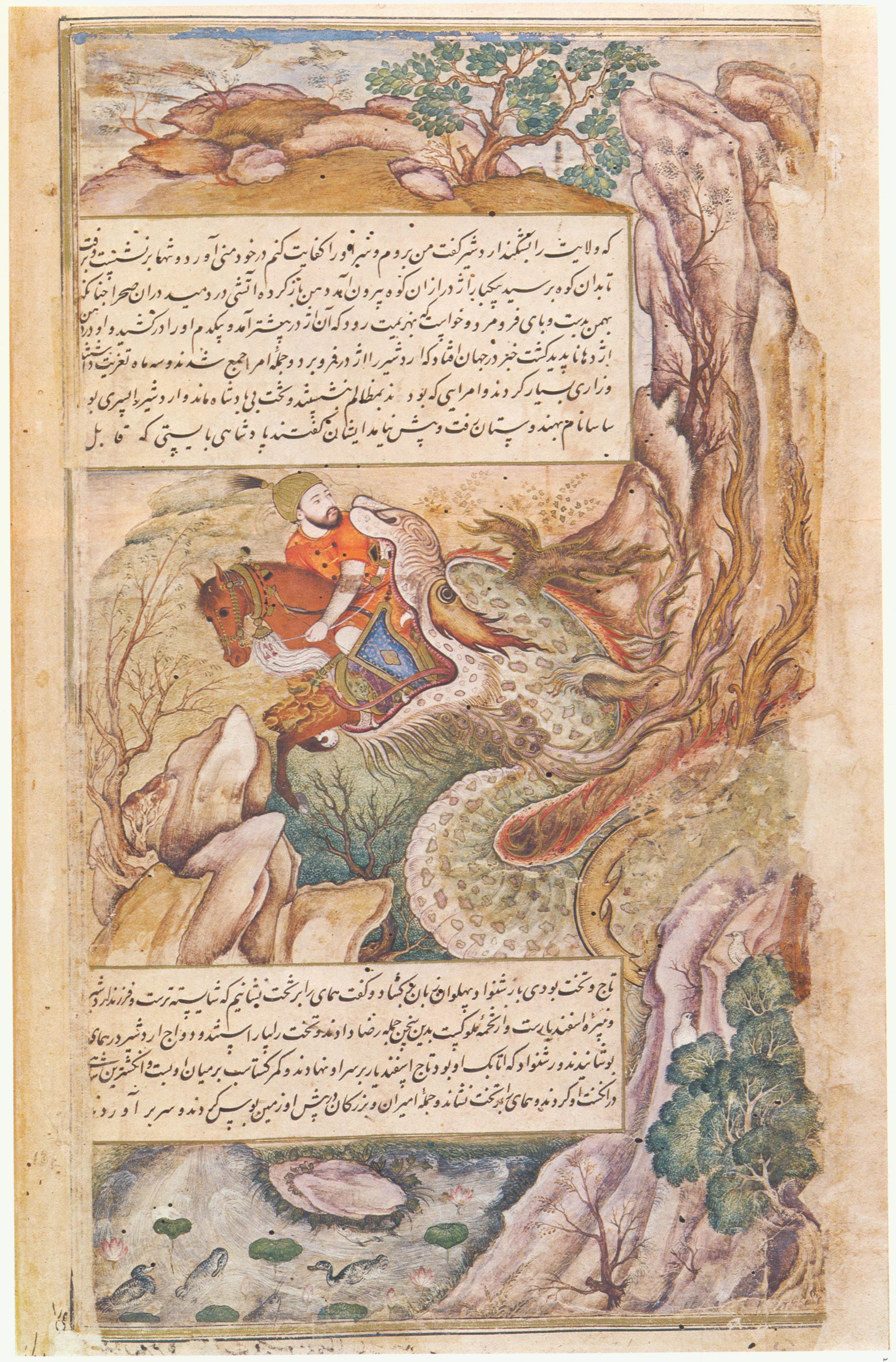
Bahman and his horse are swallowed by a dragon. Manuscript made for Akbar, c. 1585.

In Oman, he falls in love with queen Tamrusia who was widowed and was of Greek origin. They flee Oman together by ships for the islands of Greece. The lovers encounter many obstacles including the storms of the sea, talismans, cannibals and sea monsters. But through prophetic dreams, magical cures, divine intervention, and the heroic acts of Darab, they are saved. However, circumstances separate the two, and Darab, by this time thirty years old, reaches an island. On the island, he marries the former king's daughter and is crowned king. Meanwhile, Tamrusiya meets her brother Mehrasb, and they undergo adventures in the Greek islands. Circumstances lead to their separation and Mehrasb marries a mermaid (Dokhtar-e-Abi). Four years later, Tamrusiya returns to the sea. Mehrasb also sets sail, reaching an island of one-eyed people. Mehrasb becomes their king and marries Gowharasa, the former king's widow, whose sister Zankalisa has married Darab. Gowharasa dies, and Mehrasb kills all her family.

The apes sailing in turtle shells and carrying fishbone weapons attacking the boat in which Tamrusia is travelling. Manuscript made for Akbar, c. 1585

When Darab learns of the massacre of the family of Gowharasa, he conquers the island and takes Mehrasb as prisoner. Tamrusia reaches Darab's island, and they get married. Darab's other wife, Zankalisa, also arrives and kills her rival, but a new born son of Tamrusia survives. Darab names this son by his own name "Darab". Zankalisa later is poisoned by a snake bite and dies. Darab and his son set out to return to Persia.

While passing through Oman, Darab learns that his mother Homay was defeated in the battle against the Caesar of Rome, who is descendant from Shahnameh mythical hero Salm, the son of Fereydun (a hero from the Shahnameh). Thus the Caesar of Rome is also distantly related to Darab. Darab prepares to aid Homay, but before he can reach her, Homay is captured in Ray (ancient name for a part of modern Tehran). Darab rescues her, and she turns the throne to him. Caesar of Rome is eventually captured and is held in Estakhr (ancient city in modern Fars province). Further fighting results in the defeat of Filqus, the brother of the Caesar. He is captured by Darab, and Darab demands his daughter Nahid (Old Persian Anahita, which also meant Venus) as a tribute.

Nahid and Darab are married, however Darab sends her back to her, because of her bad breath. However, Nahid is impregnated by Darab before being sent back. In secret, she gives birth to Iskandar (Alexander the Great). In order to avoid a scandal, she leaves him on a mountain where Aristotle has his retreats. Alexander the Great is found by an old woman, who takes care of him, nourishes him and rears him under the supervision of Aristotle. At the same time, Darab dies and his son, also named Darab becomes king of Persia.

Alexander the Great at this time starts his conquest of Persia, and he and Darab (the son), who are half-brothers, finally meet on the battlefield. Darab is killed during this battle, and while dying, Alexander comes to see him. One of the last requests of Darab before dying was that Alexander marry his daughter, Rowshanak (also named Buran-Dokht). However, Rowshanak (compare to Roxanna in Greek sources for an Iranian princess married by Alexander) is not happy about this marriage. Rowshanak, being a warrior and warlike woman herself, raises an army to do battle against Alexander. Battle rages in several places from Aleppo to Estakhr in Fars. Alexander finally captures Rowshanak. She again refuses to marry him and escapes from Alexander. Subsequently, after more fighting around Estakhar, Alexander surprises Rowshanak while she is bathing. Finally, she agrees to marry Alexander.

After they are married, Alexander installs Rowshanak as the queen of Persia and sets off for other lands. His primary aim now is conversing with sages and seeking the Water of Life (foundation of youth where whoever drinks from it lives forever). He first sets off to India where he encounters the Indian King Kaydavar, with, or aided by, water. This king resists Alexander so strongly that he is forced to send Rowshanak for reinforcement. Rowshanak leaders a Persian army into India and captures Kaydavar. Rowshanak continues to aid Alexander in other missions, particularly against wizardry and magic. This is because she is divinely protected against natural hazards. In India Rowshanak and Alexandar have several adventures where she is aided by the water. After the campaign in India, Alexander sets sail for the Arabian Peninsula. He passes through Mecca and pauses in Egypt. In Egypt, Rowshanak and her part way and they do not meet again. Rowshanak returns to Persia and Alexander heads west in search of the Water of Life. The story ends when Alexandar dies in Jerusalem and Rowshanak dies shortly after in Persia.

== See also ==
- List of Persian poets and authors
- Persian literature
- Alexander the Great

== Sources ==
- Gaillard, Marina (2023). "Alexander the Great or Būrān-Dukht: who is the true hero of the Dārāb-nāma of Ṭarsūsī?". Iranian Studies: 1–14. doi:10.1017/irn.2023.49.
- Hanaway, William L. (1994). "DĀRĀB-NĀMA". In Yarshater, Ehsan (ed.). Encyclopædia Iranica. Vol. VII/1: Dārā(b)–Dastūr al-Afāżel. London and New York: Routledge & Kegan Paul. pp. 8–9. ISBN 978-1-56859-019-6.
- Mir-Ansari, Ali; Asatryan, Mushegh (2017). "Dārābnāmah". In Madelung, Wilferd; Daftary, Farhad (eds.). Encyclopaedia Islamica Online. Brill Online. ISSN 1875-9831.
