= Dam San =

Hero in the epic poem of the Rade people

Đăm Săn is the main character in the epic The Song of Đăm Săn (Rade: Klei khan y Dam San; Vietnamese: Trường ca Đam San), which consists of 2,077 lines and reflects the historical and cultural characteristics of the Rade people in the Central Highlands.

== Content ==
According to the matrilineal marriage customs of the Rade people, Đăm Săn had to marry two sisters, Hơ Nhị and Hơ Bhị. The heavens "arranged the marriage." Đăm Săn was compelled to obey the customs but continued to resist this marriage.

As a heroic chieftain, Đăm Săn achieved great feats in labor, such as taming wild elephants, farming, and fishing. His most remarkable feat was defeating Mtao Grự (the Vulture Chieftain) and Mtao Mxây (the Iron Chieftain), who had kidnapped Đăm Săn's wives. After his victories, the servants and villagers of the defeated chieftains willingly followed him, bringing their wealth along. With each victory, Đăm Săn grew richer and more powerful, earning higher prestige among the people.

Đăm Săn, having triumphantly rescued his wives from the clutches of two mighty chieftains, stands as the most affluent and revered leader in the realm, his renown echoing among the gods. Despite his fame reaching divine ears, he remains unfulfilled and seeks the ultimate glory: a journey to the divine realm to wed the Sun Goddess and boost his prestige and might. Armed with sharp weapons, potent magical charms, a strong horse, and fearless determination, he sets off into the dark jungle of the swamp dividing heaven and earth, despite his wives' earnest pleas to stay. Friends and elders advise him against the dangerous path filled with fierce animals, traps, and harsh conditions, reminding him that even epic heroes, powerful chieftains, and brave warriors are no match for nature's power. Undeterred, Đăm Săn disregards their warnings and continues his journey.

Đăm Săn eventually reaches Heaven, where the venerated Sun Goddess resides in a never-ending golden longhouse. Notified by her maidens of the skies, the Sun Goddess greets him and asks why he has come from such a distant place. After listening to Đăm Săn's request and proposal, she rejects him, explaining that not only is he already married, but her presence on Earth would cause widespread devastation: all living things would be burnt or starve as water evaporates and land splits.

Feeling defeated, Đăm Săn decides to leave but is advised by the Sun Goddess to wait, because her rising will melt the swamp, and he will drown. Ignoring her advice, Đăm Săn rides his horse through the jungle as she rises, leading to his death. Before his end, he sends a dragonfly to relay the news to his wives. A funeral is held in his honor, and his soul becomes a fly that enters his sister's mouth, giving rise to a descendant who will continue Đăm Săn's path.

== See also ==
- Rade people
