= Abu Tahir Tarsusi =

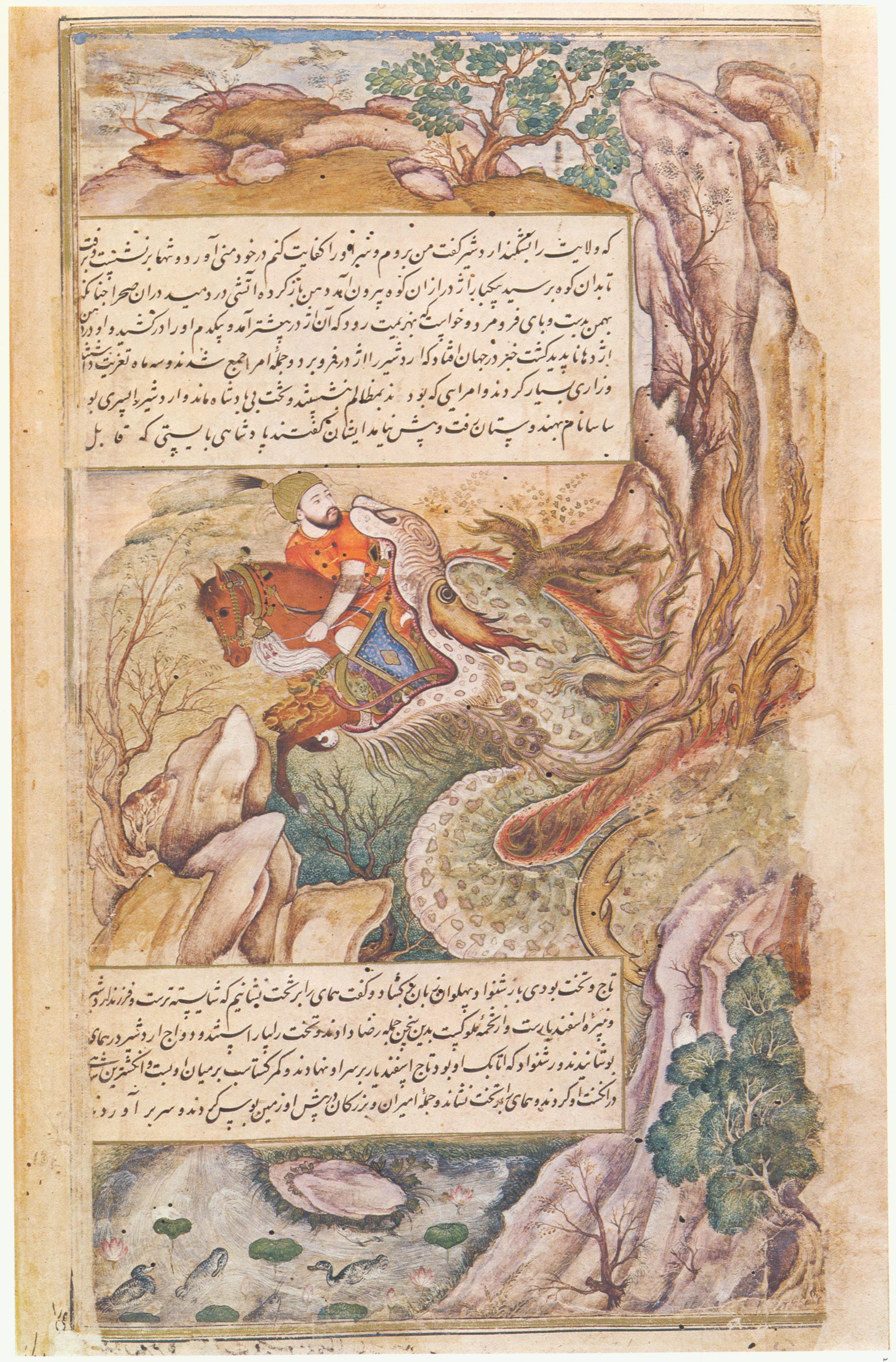
Folio from the Darab-nama depicting Kay Bahman and his horse being devoured by a dragon. Copy made in Mughal India, dated c. 1585

Abu Tahir Tarsusi (Persian: ابوطاهر طرسوسی) was a 12th-century story-teller and writer, who is credited with having written seven stories, including the Darab-nama.

No information exists about his life. His nisba Tarsusi (also spelled Tartusi) indicates a connection to either Tarsus in Asia Minor or Tartus in Syria. His parents, or perhaps himself, may have resettled in Asia Minor or Syria. During this period, this area served as a fronter region between the Muslims and Christians, and was constantly affected by war and raids. Rule over the area shifted various times between the Byzantine Empire and numerous Muslim states. This made the Muslim residents migrate to other Muslim lands, and Abu Tahir, or his ancestors, were one of those people. Some of Abu Tahir's stories indicate that was an adherent of Shia Islam.

Abu Tahir's Iranian background is confirmed by his grasp over the Persian language, as well as the theme of his stories, such as the Darab-nama and Qahraman-nama, both of which are mainly focused on historical or legendary figures of ancient Iran.

== Sources ==
- Bernjian, Farhoud (2008). "Abū Ṭāhir Ṭarsūsī". In Madelung, Wilferd; Daftary, Farhad (eds.). Encyclopaedia Islamica Online. Brill Online. ISSN 1875-9831.
