= Aethlius =

Ancient Greek mythological figure

Aethlius or Aithlios (Ancient Greek: Ἀέθλιος means 'winning the prize') or Aethnos was, in Greek mythology, the first king of Elis.

== Family ==
Aethlius was the son of Zeus and Protogeneia (daughter of Deucalion), and was married to Calyce by whom he fathered Endymion. According to some accounts, Endymion was himself a son of Zeus and first king of Elis. Other traditions again made Aethlius a son of Aeolus, who was called by the name of Zeus.

== Mythology ==
Aethlius led Aeolians from Thessaly and founded Elis. According to Eusebius, as a means of challenging his sons, Aethlius use the concept of Olympics of the Idaean Dactyls and it was from his name that the adversaries are called athletes. After Aethlius, his sons Epeius and then Endymion, Alexinus and Oenomaus were each in charge of the sacrifices connected with the festival.

Deucalion	Pyrrha
~ Zeus (Note: Although Zeus copulated with all of Pyrrha's daughters, he was presumably only the father of Hellen; cf. West (1985, p. 56).)	(stones)
Hellen (hellenes)	Thyia ~ Zeus	Pandora ~ Zeus	Protogeneia ~ Zeus	leleges
Dorus (dorians)	Xuthus	Aeolus (aeolians)	Magnes (magnetes)	Makedon (Makedones)	Graecus (Graecians)	Aethlius
Aegimius	Achaeus (achaeans)	Ion (ionians)	Endymion
Dymas (dymanes)	Pamphylus (pamphyli)	Aetolus (aetolians)

The genealogy of Aethlius according to Hesiod's Catalogue of Women
