= Magnetes =

Ancient Greek tribe

The Magnetes (Greek: Μάγνητες) were an ancient Greek tribe. In book 2 of the Iliad, Homer includes them in the Greek army that is besieging Troy, and identifies their homeland Magnesia in Thessaly, corresponding roughly to what is still known as Magnesia (regional unit). Later, they participated in the Greek colonisation of Western Anatolia by founding two prosperous cities in Ionia: Magnesia on the Maeander and Magnesia ad Sipylum.

== Mythology ==
According to the Hesiodic Catalogue of Women (fr. 7), Thyia, a daughter of Deucalion, lay with Zeus and bore two sons: Magnes and Makedon, the eponyms of the Magnetes and Makedones, respectively. Within Thyia's extended family in the Catalogue are found the progenitors of several of the other early Greek tribes. Her sister Pandora II (named after her grandmother, the famous Pandora) bore Graecus (also to Zeus). And their brother Hellen, along with his three sons Dorus, Xuthus (with his sons Ion and Achaeus) and Aeolos, filled out the set of progenitors of the ancient tribes that formed the Greek/Hellenic nation.

== Family tree ==
Deucalion	Pyrrha	Zeus
Hellen (hellenes)	Thyia	Pandora II
Dorus (dorians)	Xuthus	Aeolus (aeolians)	Magnes (magnetes)	Makedon (makedones)	Graecus (graeci)
Achaeus (achaeans)	Ion (ionians)

The genealogical relation between the early Greek tribes within the family of Deucalion.
