= Graecus =

Eponym of the Graecians in Greek mythology

In Greek mythology, Graecus (/ˈɡriːkəs/; Ancient Greek: Γραικός, romanized: Graikos, lit. 'Greek' or 'pertaining to the Greek people') was the son of Zeus and Pandora, daughter of Deucalion, and the eponym of the Graecians.

According to the Byzantine author John the Lydian (c. AD 490 – 565), Hesiod, in his Catalogue of Women, states that Graecus is the son of Zeus and Pandora, daughter of Deucalion and Pyrrha, and says, in addition, that he has a brother, Latinus. The Byzantine author Stephanus of Byzantium (fl. 6th century AD) states that Graecus was a son of Thessalus.

Graecus was the eponym of the Graecians, a group of Hellenic people who lived westwards of the Hellenes mentioned by Homer. The Hellenic peoples collectively came to be known as Graeci in Latin, after the Graecians.

Deucalion	Pyrrha
~ Zeus (Note: Although Zeus copulated with all of Pyrrha's daughters, he was presumably only the father of Hellen; cf. West (1985, p. 56).)	(stones)
Hellen (hellenes)	Thyia ~ Zeus	Pandora ~ Zeus	Protogeneia ~ Zeus	leleges
Dorus (dorians)	Xuthus	Aeolus (aeolians)	Magnes (magnetes)	Makedon (Makedones)	Graecus (Graecians)	Aethlius
Aegimius	Achaeus (achaeans)	Ion (ionians)	Endymion
Dymas (dymanes)	Pamphylus (pamphyli)	Aetolus (aetolians)

The genealogy of Graecus according to Hesiod's Catalogue of Women

== See also ==
- Graea
- Names of the Greeks
