= Names of the Greeks =

Ethnonyms for the Greeks

The Greeks (Greek: Έλληνες) have been identified by many ethnonyms. The most common native ethnonym is Hellene (Ancient Greek: Ἕλλην), pl. Hellenes (Ἕλληνες); the name Greeks (Latin: Graeci) was used by the ancient Romans and gradually entered the European languages through its use in Latin. The mythological patriarch Hellen is the named progenitor of the Greek peoples; his descendants the Aeolians, Dorians, Achaeans and Ionians correspond to the main Greek tribes and to the main dialects spoken in Greece and Asia Minor (Anatolia).

The first Greek-speaking people, called Myceneans or Mycenean-Achaeans by historians, entered present-day Greece sometime in the Neolithic era or the Bronze Age. Homer refers to "Achaeans" as the dominant tribe during the Trojan War period usually dated to the 12th–11th centuries BC, using Hellenes to describe a relatively small tribe in Thessaly. The Dorians, an important Greek-speaking group, appeared roughly at that time. According to the Greek tradition, the Graeci (Latin; Ancient Greek: Γραικοί, Graikoi, "Greeks") were renamed Hellenes probably with the establishment of the Great Amphictyonic League after the Trojan War.

When the Romans first encountered Greek colonists in Southern Italy, they used the name Graeci for the colonists and then for all Greeks; this became the root of all relevant terms in European languages. The Persians used the name Yaunas (Yunans) after the Ionians, a Greek tribe who colonized part of the coasts of western Asia Minor. The term was used later in Hebrew (Yevanim, יוונים), Arabic, and also by the Turks. The word entered the languages of the Indian subcontinent as the Yona. A unique form is used in Georgian, where the Greeks are called Berdzeni (ბერძენი).

By Late Antiquity (c. 3rd–7th centuries), the Greeks referred to themselves as Graikoi (Γραικοί, "Greeks") and Rhomaioi/Romioi (Ῥωμαῖοι/Ῥωμηοί/Ρωμιοί, "Romans") the latter of which was used since virtually all Greeks were Roman citizens after 212 AD. The term Hellene started to be applied to the followers of the polytheistic ("pagan") religion after the establishment of Christianity by Theodosius I.

== General names of Greece ==
Most European languages, as well as other languages that have borrowed the name from one of them, use names for Greece that come from the Latin Graecia and Graecus, the name the Romans used for the Greeks, itself from the Greek Γραικός:

- Afrikaans: Griekeland
- Albanian: Greqia
- Aromanian: Gãrtsia
- Belarusian: Грэцыя (Hrecyja)
- Bulgarian: Гърция (Gǎrcija); the alternative historical name Елада (Elada) for ancient Greece is also used sometimes.
- Bosnian: Grčka
- Catalan: Grècia
- Chechen: Греци (Gretsi)
- Cherokee: ᎪᎢᎯ (Goihi)
- Czech: Řecko
- Welsh: Groeg
- Danish: Grækenland
- Dutch: Griekenland
- Esperanto: Grekujo
- German: Griechenland
- Greek: Γραικία (rare or obsolete use)
- English: Greece
- Spanish: Grecia
- Estonian: Kreeka
- Basque: Grezia
- Finnish: Kreikka
- Filipino: Gresiya
- French: Grèce
- West Frisian: Grikelân
- Irish: An Ghréig
- Croatian: Grčka
- Hungarian: Görögország
- Icelandic: Grikkland
- Italian: Grecia
- Japanese: ギリシャ (Girisha)
- Khmer: ក្រិច (Krech)
- Korean: 그리스 (Geuriseu)
- Cornish: Pow Grek
- Lithuanian: Graikija
- Latvian: Grieķija
- Macedonian: Грција (Grcija)
- Maltese: Greċja
- Nahuatl languages: Grecia
- Polish: Grecja
- Portuguese: Grécia
- Romanian: Grecia
- Russian: Греция (Grecija)
- Serbo-Croatian: Grčka / Грчка
- Sinhala: ග්රීසිය (Grisiya)
- Slovak: Grécko
- Slovene: Grčija
- Somali: Giriiga
- Serbian: Грчка / Grčka
- Swedish: Grekland
- Thai: กรีซ (Krīt)
- Ukrainian: Греція (Hrecija)

In languages of Middle East and South and Central Asia, the common root is "yun" or "ywn". It is borrowed from the Greek name Ionia, a once Greek region of Asia Minor, and the Ionians:

- Arabic: يونان (Yūnān)
- Imperial Aramaic: ܝܘܢ or יון (Yawān, Yawon)
- Armenian: Հունաստան (Hunastan)
  - Old Armenian: Յունաստան (Yunastan)
- Prakrit languages: 𑀬𑁄𑀦 (Yona)
  - Pali: 𑀬𑁄𑀦 (Yona)
- Biblical Hebrew: יָוָן (Yāwān)
- Hebrew: יוון (Yavan)
- Azerbaijani: Yunanıstan
- Indonesian: Yunani
- Hindi: यूनान (Yūnān)
- Malay: Yunani
- Persian: یونان (Yūnān)
  - Old Persian: 𐎹𐎢𐎴 (Yauna)
- Kurdish: Yewnanistan
- Nepali: यूनान (Yūnān)
- Urdu: یونانی (Yūnān)
- Sanskrit: यवन (Yavana)
- Tajik: Юнон (Yunon)
- Turkish: Yunanistan

The third form is "Hellas", used by a few languages around the world, including Greek:

- Greek: Hellas or Hellada
  - Polytonic: Ἑλλάς or Ἑλλάδα
  - Monotonic: Ελλάς or Ελλάδα
- Aromanian: Elladhã
- Norwegian: Hellas
- Vietnamese: Hy Lạp
- Italian: Ellade (rare usage)
- Albanian: Elladhë (used for Ancient Greece)
- Chinese: 希臘/希腊 (Hanyu Pinyin: Xīlà; Jyutping: hei1 laap6)
- Spanish: Hélade (rare usage)
- Hawaiian: Helene

Other forms:

- Middle Persian: 𐭧𐭫𐭥𐭬𐭠𐭣𐭩𐭪𐭩 (Hrōmāyīg)
- Laz: Xorumona (ხორუმონა)
- Georgian: საბერძნეთი (saberdzneti)

== Brief history ==
The first people speaking an ancient Proto-Greek language entered mainland Greece during the Neolithic period or the Bronze Age. From the Ancient Greek dialects as they presented themselves centuries later, it seems that at least two migrations of Greeks occurred overall, the first of the Ionians and the Aeolians probably in the 19th century BC and the second of the Dorians probably in the 13th century BC. The first migration resulted in Mycenean Greek, an archaic Greek language which appears in Linear B syllabic inscriptions, and the second resulted in the Dorian dialect, which displaced the Arcadocypriot dialect that seems to be closest to the Mycenean Greek.

The tribes later called Aeolians and Ionians established several feudal kingdoms around Greece, and the historians called them Myceneans after their most powerful kingdom Mycenea in Peloponnese, or Myceneans-Achaeans because in Homer the Achaeans were the dominating tribe in Greece and the name Achiyawa that appears in Hittite texts seems to correspond to a thalassocratic country which might be Mycenea.

Although Homer referred to a union of the Greek kingdoms under the leadership of the king of Mycenae during the Trojan War, there is no evidence that these kingdoms were dominated by a central power. Most of the Mycenaean palaces were destroyed at the end of the 13th century BC. The Greek tradition relates this destruction to the Dorians, but it is suggested that the Dorian invasion was only one of the causes of the Bronze Age collapse in the Eastern Mediterranean, as there is no evidence that the newcomers established a different civilization. The destruction was followed by the Greek Dark Ages with very poor archaeological findings, when most occupied areas were deserted, but some areas like Attica occupied by the Ionians remained untouched by the invaders. Several Greek tribes moved to regions of Greece where they acquired different names, and population groups moved through the islands to the western coasts of Asia Minor where they kept their native names Aeolians, Ionians and Dorians.

It seems that the myth of Hellen, the progenitor of the Hellenes, was invented when the Greek tribes started to separate from each other, and stressed their common origin. The name "Hellenes" was probably used by the Greeks with the establishment of the Great Amphictyonic League, an ancient association of Greek tribes. According to legend it was founded after the Trojan War, by the eponymous Amphictyon, brother of Hellen. It had twelve founders and was organized to protect the great temples of Apollo in Delphi (Phocis) and of Demeter near Thermopylae (Locris). The twelve founders enumerated by Aeschines were the Aenianes or Oetaeans (Αἰνιᾶνες, Οἰταῖοι), the Boeotians (Βοιωτοί) of Thebes, the Dolopes (Δόλοπες), the Dorians (Δωριείς) of Sparta, the Ionians (Ἴωνες) of Athens, the Phthian Achaeans (Ἀχαιοί), the Locrians (Λοκροί) (Opuntians, Ὀπούντιοι and Ozolians, Ὀζολαί), the Magnesians (Μάγνητες), the Malians (Μαλιεῖς), the Perrhaebians (Περραιβοί), the Phocians (Φωκεῖς), the Pythians (Πύθιοι) of Delphi, and the Thessalians (Θεσσαλοί). Among the descendants of Hellen are mentioned Aeolus, Ion, Achaeus, Dorus, Graecus and Makedon. It seems that the Macedonians were a Dorian tribe that stayed behind in Macedonia when the main Dorian tribes moved to the south.

== Achaeans (Ἀχαιοί) ==
Late Bronze Age Hittite texts mention a nation called Ahhiya and subsequently Ahhiyawa which have been identified in scholarship as part of the Mycenaean world. Egyptian records mention peoples known as Ekwesh, Denyen and Tanaju that have been also linked to the Mycenaean world.

In Homer's Iliad, the Greek allied forces are described under three different names: Achaeans (Ἀχαιοί, Akhaioí, used 598 times), Danaans (Δαναοί, Danaoí, used 138 times) and Argives (Ἀργεῖοι, Argeîoi, used 29 times). All of the aforementioned terms were used synonymously to denote a common Greek identity.

A fourth term – "Panhellenes" – (Πανέλληνες "All of the Greeks") and "Hellenes'" (/ˈhɛliːnz/; Ἕλληνες) – both appear only once; implying it was not a central concept in Homer's work. In some English translations of the Iliad, the Achaeans are simply called "the Greeks" throughout.

== Hellenes (Ἕλληνες) ==
The main Greek sanctuaries and localization of the sanctuary of Dodona.

There is currently no satisfactory etymology for the name Hellenes. Some scholars assert that the name of the priests of Zeus in Dodona, Selloi (Σελλοί; also Ἑλλοί Helloi), changed to Sellanes (by analogy with Akarnanes) and then to Hellanes and Hellenes. This theory is based on Aristotle's comments in Meteorologica where he places archaic Hellas in Epirus between Dodona and the Achelous river, where in his opinion the great deluge of Deucalion must have occurred. The land was inhabited by Selloi and Graeci, who later came to be known as Hellenes. Homer mentions that the Selloi were the prophets of Zeus at Dodona, but he is referring to Zeus of Dodona as god of the Pelasgians who belonged to a Pre-Dorian population. It is possible that the extension of a particular cult of Zeus in Dodona (a tendency among the Greeks to form ever-larger cultic communities or amphictionies) caused the name to further extend to the rest of the peninsula.

This theory connects the name Hellenes with the Dorians (and the substrate of Pelasgians) who occupied Epirus in the extreme north of Greece, rendering uncertain the relation with the name Graeci used by the Romans. Some toponyms, especially an ancient city Hellas in southern Thessaly, and the Greek tradition seem to indicate that the name Hellenes was Pre-Dorian itself and that the homeland of the Graikoi, who were later called Hellenes, was in central Greece. A Greek myth mentions an earlier deluge of Ogyges in the region of Boeotia which was occupied by the Minyans a group of autochthonous or Proto-Greek speaking people. The region (situated next to Attica) was called Graïke in ancient times probably after the old city of Graea (Γραῖα Graîa, from Proto-Greek grau-j-, "old lady") on the coast. The name Ogyges (or Ogenos) is related with Okeanos (Ὠκεανός), the great river-ocean that Greeks believed to surround the Earth. The adjective derived from the name, Ogygios (Ὠγύγιος "Ogygian") came to mean "primeval, primal," or "from earliest days" and also "gigantic".

Homer refers to Hellenes as an originally relatively small tribe settled in Thessalic Phthia. During the era of the Trojan War they were centered along the settlements of Alos, Alope, Trachis, and the Pelasgian Argos. This Homeric Hellas is described as "καλλιγύναικος", kalligýnaikos, "of beautiful women", and its warriors, the Hellenes, along with the feared Myrmidons, were under the command of Achilles. The Parian Chronicle mentions that Phthia was the homeland of the Hellenes and that this name was given to those previously called Greeks (Γραικοί). Alcman (7th century BC) also refers that the mothers of Hellenes were Graikoi. In Greek mythology, Hellen, the patriarch of Hellenes, was son of Deucalion, who ruled around Phthia with Pyrrha, the only survivors after the great deluge. It seems that the myth was invented when the Greek tribes started to separate from each other in certain areas of Greece and it indicates their common origin. The name Hellenes was probably used by the Greeks with the establishment of the Great Amphictyonic League. This was an ancient association of Greek tribes with twelve founders which was organized to protect the great temples of Apollo in Delphi (Phocis) and of Demeter near Thermopylae (Locris). According to legend it was founded after the Trojan War, by the eponymous Amphictyon, brother of Hellen.

== Greeks (Γραικοί) ==
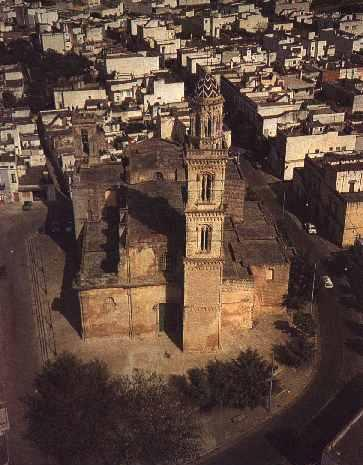
Soleto is one of the nine Greek-speaking towns in the province of Apulia, Italy. Their inhabitants are descendants of the first wave of Greek settlers in Italy and Sicily in the 8th century BC. The dialect they speak evolved separately from Hellenistic Greek. The people of these towns call themselves Griki, from the Latin Graecus.

The modern English noun Greek (Old English Grecas or Crecas) is derived from the Latin Graeci, which in turn originates from Ancient Greek Γραικός (Graikós). It seems that the word is related to the Greek word γέρων geron "old man" (from the PIE base *ǵerh_{2}- "to grow old") via Proto-Greek *gera- "old age", also related to Mycenean Greek kera /geras/, "gift of honour". The Germanic languages borrowed the name with an initial k sound, which was probably their initial sound closest to the Latin g (Gothic Kreks).

The first use of Graikos as equivalent to Hellenes is found in Aristotle for the Dorians in Epirus from Graii, a native name of the Epirotes. He places the seat of these most ancient "Greeks" in the region of the Achelous river around Dodona, where in his opinion the great deluge of Deucalion must have occurred. The priests of Zeus in Dodona were called Selloi, which could lead to Sellanes (like Akarnanes), and then to Hellanes and Hellenes.

Homer is referring to Hellenes as a relatively small tribe in Phthia in central Greece (Achaea Phthiotis). In the Parian Chronicle it is mentioned that Phthia was the homeland of Hellenes and that this name was given to those previously called Graikoi (Γραικοί). In Greek mythology, Hellen, the patriarch of Hellenes, was son of Deucalion (who ruled around Phthia) and Pyrrha, the only survivors after the great deluge. Hesiod is referring to Graecus, son of Pandora, who was sister of Hellen. Alcman mentions that the mothers of Hellenes were Graikoi.

The German classical historian Georg Busolt (1850–1920) derives the name from Graikos, "inhabitant of Graea, a town on the coast of Boeotia. The name Graea (γραῖα) is derived from Proto-Greek grau-j-, "old lady". Homer, while reciting the Boeotian forces in the Iliad's Catalogue of Ships, provides the first known reference to a region named Graea, and Pausanias mentions that the ancient city of Tanagra was for a time called Graea, adding that "no one knows where this Graia really was; Aristotle thought it was near Oropus, further east on the same coast as Delion." Busolt claimed that the name was given by the Romans originally to the Greek colonists from Graea who helped to found Cumae the important city in southern Italy where the Italic peoples first encountered the Greeks and then to all Greeks.

According to Irad Malkin, Graikoi could have also been an exonym for the Greeks, used by neighboring Illyrians and Messapians. It has been suggested that the name Graeci was possibly an Illyrian name for a Greek tribe with whom they were in contact in north Epirus. N. G. L. Hammond has pointed out that the names Graeci and Hellenes spread from contact with small tribes or with Graia, a defunct Greek polis in the Gulf of Euboea.

According to Rene Olivier, in the French language the word grec ("Greek") is sometimes also used as an ethnic slur meaning "fraudster" (in contrast with hellénique which has no negative connotations).

== Spread of the use of the term "Hellenes" ==
Hellenes in the wider meaning of the word appears in writing for the first time in an inscription by Echembrotus, dedicated to Heracles for his victory in the Amphictyonic Games, and refers to the 48th Olympiad (584 BC). Simonides of Ceos in his epigram on the tomb of the Athenians who were killed in the Battle of Marathon (490 BC) wrote "Ἑλλήνων προμαχοῦντες Ἀθηναῖοι Μαραθῶνι […]" "Fighting at the forefront of the Hellenes, the Athenians at Marathon […]" and after the Greco-Persian Wars, an inscription was written in Delphi celebrating victory over the Persians and calling Pausanias the leading general of the Hellenes. Awareness of a Pan-Hellenic unity was promoted by religious festivals, most significantly in the Eleusinian Mysteries, in which prospective initiates had to speak Greek, and almost as importantly through participation in the four Panhellenic Games, including the Olympic Games, in which participants were exclusively Greek and recognized by tribal affiliation.

== The tribal societies of the north ==
The development of mythological genealogies of descent from eponymous founder-figures, long after the actual southward migration of the four tribal groups recognized by the Greeks, affected how the identity of northern tribes was perceived. According to the most prevailing legend, Hellen, son of Deucalion and Pyrrha, received from the nymph Orseis three sons, Aeolus, Dorus, and Xuthus, each of whom begot a primary tribe of Hellas–the Aeolians, Dorians, Achaeans and Ionians—the latter by way of his two sons, Achaeus and Ion.

At the time of the Trojan War, the Epirotes (Molossians, Thesprotians and Chaonians) were not considered Hellenes, for the people so named were then limited to a small tribe in Thessaly of which Achilles was a member. After the name was extended to all peoples south of Mount Olympus, however, it still left out those of common origin living in the north. One factor contributing to this was their non-participation in the Persian Wars, which were considered a vital affair for all Hellenes; subsequent to the Persian Wars, representatives of these tribes were accepted in the Olympic Games and competed alongside other Hellenes. The fact that each of these northern peoples at this time continued to live as an ethnos, or collection of tribes, under an archaic monarchial political system – as opposed to the democratic or oligarchic polis (city state) of the south–also contributed to this view of them as "barbaric".

Thucydides calls the Acarnanians, Aetolians, Epirotes and Upper Macedonians barbarians, but does so in a strictly linguistic sense – these peoples were considered barbarophone to the extent that their dialects of Greek were sufficiently different and archaic so as to sound crude and barely understandable to a southern Attic speaker such as Thucydides. Similarly, when the Athenian orator Demosthenes called Philip II of Macedon worse than a barbarian in his Third Philippic, he did so with respect to the culture they demonstrated as foreigners not adhering to proper Hellenic standards, and did not raise the issue of their origin: "not only no Greek, nor related to the Greeks, but not even a barbarian from any place that can be named with honors, but a pestilent knave from Macedonia, whence it was never yet possible to buy a decent slave." Herodotus, Polybius, Strabo and a large number of other Greek and Roman writers regard the tribes of western Hellas, Epirus, and Macedonia as Hellenic in every respect. Both Thucydides and Demosthenes were themselves of partial non-Attic origins and for Demosthenes it seems of non-Greek origins altogether while notably both of them held strong opposing political positions against Macedonians.

== Hellenes and barbarians ==
In the following centuries, Hellene typically contrasted with barbarian, representing the uncivilized.

The Greek tribes quickly noticed that they did not speak the same tongue as their neighbors, and used the term "βάρβαρος" ("barbarian") for them, with the meanings "uncultured", "uncivilized" or "speaker of a foreign language". The term βάρβαρος is thought to be onomatopoeic in origin: "bar-bar"—i.e. stammering—may have been how the speech of foreign peoples sounded to Greek-speakers. This was also the case for the Egyptians, who, according to Herodotus, "named barbarians all those who spoke a different tongue", and in later years for the Slavs, who gave the Germans the name němec, which means "mute", while calling themselves slověnski or "people of the word". In his play The Birds, Aristophanes calls the illiterate supervisor a "barbarian" who nevertheless taught the birds how to talk. The term eventually picked up a derogatory use and was extended to indicate the entire lifestyle of foreigners, and finally coming to mean "illiterate" or "uncivilized" in general. Thus "an illiterate man is also a barbarian". According to Dionysius of Halicarnassus, a Hellene differed from a barbarian in four ways: refined language, education, religion, and the rule of law. Greek education became identified with noble upbringing. Paul of Tarsus considered it his obligation to preach the Gospel to all men, "Hellenes and barbarians, both wise and foolish".

Discrimination between Hellenes and barbarians lasted until the 4th century BC. Euripides thought it plausible that Hellenes should rule over barbarians, because the first were destined for freedom and the other for slavery. Aristotle came to the conclusion that "the nature of a barbarian and a slave is one and the same".

Alexander the Great's conquests consolidated Greek influence in the East by exporting Greek culture into Asia and permanently transformed education and society in the region. Isocrates declared in his speech Panegyricus, speaking about Athens and Greece: "And so far has our city distanced the rest of mankind in thought and in speech that her pupils have become the teachers of the rest of the world; and she has brought it about that the name Hellenes suggests no longer a race but an intelligence, and that the title Hellenes is applied rather to those who share our culture than to those who share a common blood". With a small reformation, the Hellenistic civilization is the evolution of classical Greek civilization into a civilization with global proportions, this time open to everybody. Similarly, Hellene evolved from a national name signifying an ethnic Greek to a cultural term signifying anybody who conducted his life according to Greek mores.

== Berdznebi (ბერძნები) ==
The term Berdznebi (sing. Berdzeni) is the Georgian exonym for the Greeks which has been in use from late antiquity to this day. The term has come to describe not only modern Greeks, but also ancient Greeks, Romans, and Byzantines, while Saberdneti (modern exonym for Greece) had been used to describe Ancient Greece, the Lysimachid Empire, the Roman Empire, and the Byzantine Empire. The origin of the term is debated among Georgian historians and linguists, with three leading theories being widespread. The first one claims that the term derived from brdzeni (ბრძენი), which translates to a sage or a wise man; with sa- and -eti being prefixes and suffixes to denote a geographical region. The second theory claims that the term is associated to pelazgi, a reference to the Pelasgians of Greece. The third and newest one claims association with Byzantion, the name of the Greek colony which evolved into the city of Constantinople.

== Ionians (Ἴωνες), Yunani, and Yavan (יָוָן) ==
A wholly different term came to establish itself in the East. The ancient people of the Middle East referred to the Hellenes as Yunan, deriving from Persian Yauna, itself a loan of Greek Ἰωνία (Ionia), the western coast of Asia Minor. It is by affiliation with the Ionian tribe the Persians conquered in the late 6th century BC that their name extended to all Hellenes. All peoples under Persian influence adopted the term, and it is from this root that Sanskrit Yavana derives, which one encounters in ancient Sanskrit sources, first attested in Pāṇini's grammar, and later referring, together with Pali Yona, Yonaka to the Indo-Greeks. The term Yunan is used in current Persian, Arabic (يوناني), Azeri, Turkish, Hindi (यूनान), Indonesian and Malay.

The related Hebrew name, Yavan or Javan (יָוָן), was used to refer to the Greek nation in the Eastern Mediterranean in early Biblical times. There was an eponymous character Javan mentioned in Genesis 10:2. In later times it was used for all Hellenistic kingdoms (for example, the Maccabeans applied it to their Seleucid foes). "Yavan" is still the name used for modern Greece in contemporary Israel.

Although the contemporary Chinese term for Greece (希臘 Xīlà) is based on Hellas, Chinese previously used what was likely a version of the Yunan or Yona root when referring to the Dàyuān (大宛). The Dàyuān were probably the descendants of the Greek colonies that were established by Alexander the Great and prospered within the Hellenistic realm of the Seleucids and Greco-Bactrians, until they were isolated by the migrations of the Yueh-Chih around 160 BC. It has been suggested that the name Yuan was simply a transliteration of the words Yunan, Yona, or Ionians, so that Dàyuān (literally "Great Yuan") would mean "Great Yunans" or "Great Ionians."

== Hellene comes to mean "pagan" ==
The name Hellene was given the meaning "pagan" by the early Christian church, and retained that meaning until the end of the millennium. It is believed that contact with Christian Jews led some Christians to use Hellene as a means of religious differentiation. Jews, like Greeks, distinguished themselves from foreigners, but unlike Greeks, did so according to religious rather than cultural standards.

Roman domination of the Greek world enhanced the prestige of the religious institutions that remained intact. Early Christians differentiated people according to religion, so the sense of the word Hellene as a cultural attribute became marginalized and then supplanted by its religious element. Eventually, Christians came to refer to all pagans as Hellenes.

St. Paul in his Epistles uses Hellene almost always juxtaposed to Hebrew, and in disregard of all other ethnicities (Romans, Syrians, Egyptians, etc.) living in the area at the time. A possible exception to this being Colossians 3:11 ("Where there is neither Greek nor Jew, circumcision nor uncircumcision, Barbarian, Scythian, bond nor free: but Christ is all, and in all." King James Version). The aim was probably to represent the aggregate of the polytheistic and the monotheistic religious communities, who respectively believed in many gods or one god. Hellene is used in a religious sense for the first time in the New Testament. In Mark 7:26, a woman arrives before Jesus, and kneeling before him: "The woman was a Hellene, a Syrophœnician by nation; and she besought him that he would cast forth the devil out of her daughter." Since the nationality or ethnicity of the woman is stated to be Syrophœnician, "Greek" (translated as such into the English of the King James Version, but as haiþno "heathen" in Ulfilas's Gothic; Wycliffe and Coverdale likewise have heathen) must therefore signify her polytheistic religion. Nevertheless, it is important to mention that phrases in koine Greek similar to the one in Mark 7:26 ("ἡ δὲ γυνὴ ἦν Ἑλληνίς, Συροφοινίκισσα τῷ γένει·") can be found in the new testament being applied to Jewish people (Acts 18:2 "καὶ εὑρών τινα Ἰουδαῖον ὀνόματι Ἀκύλαν, Ποντικὸν τῷ γένει,")(Acts 18:24 "Ἰουδαῖος δέ τις Ἀπολλὼς ὀνόματι, Ἀλεξανδρεὺς τῷ γένει,") and the Levite Barnabas (Acts 4:36, "Λευΐτης, Κύπριος τῷ γένει"). In all those cases the terms Hellene/Jew/Levite are mentioned, eventually followed by a comma, a designation such as Syrophoenician/Pontic/Alexandrian/Cypriot and after that the words "τῷ γένει", with the last words tending to have differing translations. A broadly similar terminology is found in John 12:20–23: "And there were certain Hellenes among them that came up to worship at the feast ... Jesus answered them, saying, The hour is come, that the Son of man should be glorified". This could have one of two interpretations: either that Jesus meant that the time had come for his religion to spread to the pagans (in which case the term "Hellenes" is religious), or that it would spread by using the Greek language (in which case the term "Hellenes" is meant to be linguistic). The development towards a purely religious meaning was slow, and complete by approximately the 2nd or 3rd century AD: Athenian statesman Aristeides, in his written Apology to the Emperor Hadrian, picked out the Hellenes as one of the representative pagan peoples of the world along with the Egyptians and the Chaldæans. Later, Clement of Alexandria reports an unknown Christian writer who named all of the above Hellenes and spoke of two old nations and one new: the Christian nation.

Several books written at this time demonstrate clearly the semantic shift. For example, Athanasius' Against Hellenes was originally titled Against the Gentiles (Greek: ethnikoi) according to older manuscripts. From then on, Hellene no longer meant an ethnic Greek or an adherent to Greek culture, but pagans in general, regardless of race. Emperor Julian's attempt to restore paganism failed, and according to Pope Gregory I, "matters moved in favor of Christianity and the position of the Hellenes was severely aggravated". Half a century later Christians protested against the Eparch of Alexandria, whom they accused of being a Hellene. Theodosius I initiated the first legal steps against paganism, but it was Justinian's legal reforms that triggered pagan persecutions on a massive scale. The Corpus Juris Civilis contained two statutes which decreed the total destruction of Hellenism, even in civic life, and were zealously enforced even against men in high position. The official suppression of paganism made non-Christians a public threat, which further derogated the meaning of Hellene. Paradoxically, Tribonian, Justinian's own legal commissioner, according to the Suda dictionary, was a Hellene (pagan).

The usage of Hellene as a religious term was initially part of an exclusively Christian nomenclature, but some pagans began to defiantly call themselves Hellenes. Other pagans even preferred the narrow meaning of the word from a broad cultural sphere to a more specific religious grouping. However, there were many Christians and pagans alike who strongly objected to the evolution of the terminology. The influential Archbishop of Constantinople Gregory of Nazianzus, for example, took offence at imperial efforts to suppress Hellenic culture (especially concerning spoken and written Greek) and he openly criticized the emperor.

The name Hellene meaning "pagan" has persisted into modern times. Many groups advocating a revival or reconstruction of the worship of the Olympian Gods call themselves Hellenists or Hellenic Polytheists and the religion Hellenic Polytheistic Reconstructionism or Hellenismos. Such groups outside of Greece are careful not to imply that, by calling themselves Hellenes, they consider themselves Greek nationals.

== Macedonians (Μακεδόνες) ==
The name "Macedonians", in order to colloquially mean the Greek soldiers (etc.) that Alexander the Great was first the hegemon of, is being used by – at least – contemporary sources when referring to the Hellenistic period, as the ancient Macedonian army, including the famous somatophylakes (e. g. Lysimachus) and, later, the diadochi of Alexander, consisted of warriors from numerous and diverse Greek tribes. Thus, as the Spartans (Lacedaemonians) did not take part in Alexander's campaign, Alexander once ordered for an inscription to be sent, along with some war spoils, to Athens saying "Alexander, son of Philip, and all the Greeks except the Lacedaemonians [...]". Likewise, the term "Macedonian", while referring here to Greek dialects, also ended up meaning the Koine Greek in classical sources, whereas diverse major Ancient Greek dialects were natively spoken in the later/expanded Macedonian Kingdom, and even though the Koine dialect was mostly based on Attic Greek that was natively spoken around Athens. Notably, during the reign of Constantine the Great, who is regarded as the first Byzantine Emperor, the Diocese of Macedonia was established, comprising principally the area that is modern Greece, with Thessalonica as its capital.

== Romans (Ῥωμαῖοι) ==
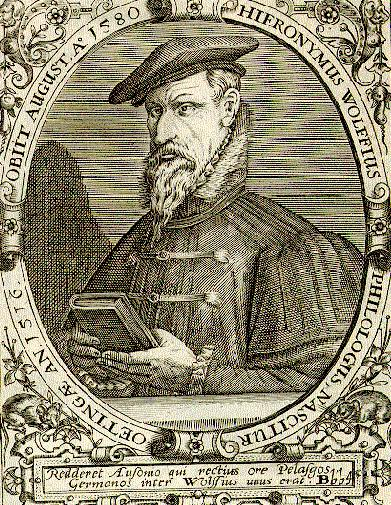
Hieronymus Wolf was a 16th-century German historian. After coming into contact with the works of Laonicus Chalcondyles, he also went ahead with identifying Byzantine historiography for the purpose of distinguishing medieval Greek from ancient Roman history.

Romans or Rhomaioi (Ῥωμαῖοι; sg. Ῥωμαῖος Rhomaios) and Romioi (Ρωμιοί; sg. Ρωμιός Romios), is the name by which the Greeks were known in the Middle Ages and during Ottoman rule. The name in antiquity originally signified the inhabitants of the city of Rome in Italy, but with the increasing grants of Roman citizenship to the Greeks and other nations of the Roman Empire, it soon lost its connection with the Latins. This process culminated in 212 AD, when Emperor Caracalla's Constitutio Antoniniana granted the citizenship to all free-born men of the Empire. Later Byzantine authors such as Nikephoros Basilakes, Michael Attaleiates, Theodore Prodromos, Patriarch Germanus II, Niketas Choniates and Nicaean Emperor Theodore II Laskaris also used the classicizing term Ausones to refer to the people of the Eastern Roman Empire, although, as John Tzetzes points out (in his Scholia to Lycophron's "Alexandra", attributed to himself and his brother Isaac), that should be understood in its proper context as a literary device. Overall, the word Rhomaios came to represent the Hellenized inhabitants of the East Roman Empire.

Initially, the foreign borrowed name (Romans) had a more political than national meaning, which went hand in hand with the universalizing ideology of Rome that aspired to encompass all nations of the world under one true God. Up until the early 7th century, when the Empire still extended over large areas and many peoples, the use of the name "Roman" always indicated citizenship and never descent. Various ethnicities could apply their own ethnonyms or toponyms to disambiguate citizenship from genealogy, which is why the historian Procopius prefers to call the Byzantines as Hellenized Romans, while other authors use Romhellenes and Graecoromans, aiming to indicate descent and citizenship simultaneously. The Lombard and Arab invasions in the same century resulted in the loss of most of the provinces including Italy and all of the Middle East, save for Anatolia. The areas that did remain were mostly Greek-speaking, thereby turning the empire into a much more cohesive unit that eventually developed a fairly self-conscious Greek identity.

The Byzantines' failure to protect the Pope from the Lombards forced the Pope to search for help elsewhere. The man who answered his call was Pepin III, whom he had named "Patrician", a title that caused a serious conflict. In 772, Rome ceased commemorating the emperor that first ruled from Constantinople, and in 800 Charlemagne was crowned Roman Emperor by the Pope himself, officially rejecting the Eastern Roman Empire as true Romans. According to the Frankish interpretation of events, the papacy appropriately "transferred Roman imperial authority from the Greeks to the Germans, in the name of His Greatness, Charles". From then on, a war of names about the New Rome revolved around Roman imperial rights. Unable to deny that an emperor did exist in Constantinople, they sufficed in renouncing him as a successor of Roman heritage on the grounds that Greeks have nothing to do with the Roman legacy. In 865, Pope Nicholas I wrote to the Emperor Michael III: "You ceased to be called 'Emperor of the Romans' since the Romans, of whom you claim to be Emperor, are in fact according to you barbarians."

Henceforth, the emperor in the East was known and referred to in the West as Emperor of the Greeks and their land as Greek Empire, reserving both "Roman" titles for the Frankish king. The interests of both sides were nominal rather than actual. No land areas were ever claimed, but the insult the Byzantines took on the accusation demonstrates how close at heart the Roman name (Ῥωμαῖος) had become to them. In fact, Bishop Liutprand of Cremona, a delegate of the Frankish court, was briefly imprisoned in Constantinople for not referring to the Roman emperor, Nikephoros II Phokas, by his appropriate title, and in reprisal for his king, Otto I, claiming the "Roman" title by styling himself as Holy Roman Emperor.

== Revival in the meaning of "Hellene" ==
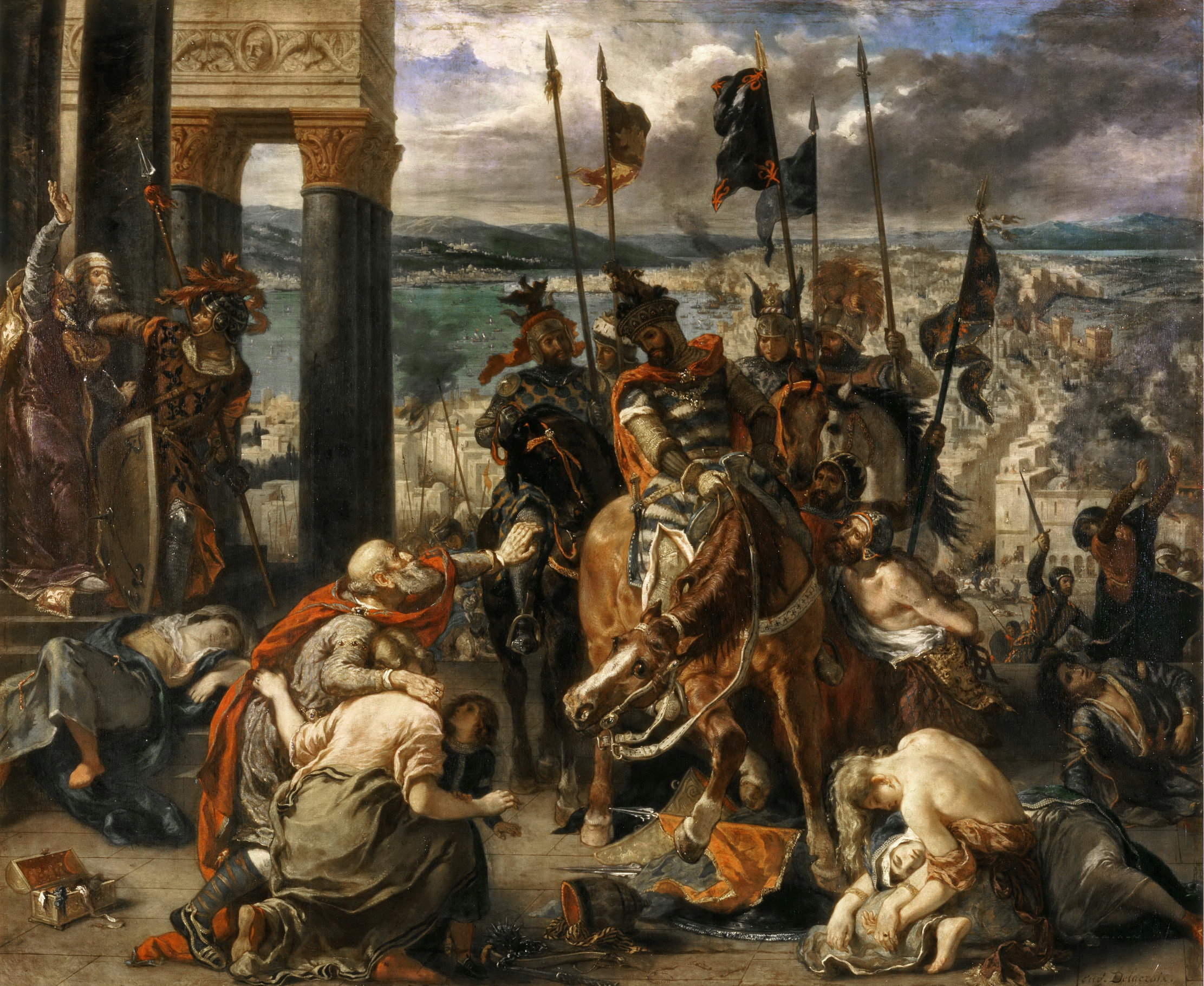
The Entry of the Crusaders into Constantinople, by Eugène Delacroix, 1840. The sack of Constantinople in 1204 by the Crusaders acerbated Greek nationalism and created disdain for the Latins which is well illustrated in the documents of the era. Niketas Choniates portrays an especially lively account of the sack and its aftermath.

The secular use of Hellene revived in the 9th century, after paganism had been eclipsed and was no longer a threat to Christianity's dominance. The revival followed the same track as its disappearance. The name had originally declined from a national term in antiquity, to a cultural term in the Hellenistic years, to a religious term in the early Christian years. With the demise of paganism and the revival of learning in the Byzantine Empire it had regained its cultural meaning, and finally, by the 11th century it had returned to its ancient national form of an "ethnic Greek", synonymous at the time to "Roman". After 1204, when the Empire consisted purely of Hellenic provinces, the term "Hellenes" was increasingly used instead.

Accounts from the 11th century onward (from Anna Komnene, Michael Psellos, John III Vatatzes, George Gemistos Plethon and several others) prove that the revival of the term Hellene (as a potential replacement for ethnic terms like Graikos and Romaios) did occur. For example, Anna Komnene writes of her contemporaries as Hellenes, but does not use the word as a synonym for a pagan worshiper. Moreover, Anna boasts about her Hellenic classical education, and she speaks as a native Greek and not as an outsider/foreigner who learned Greek.

The refounding of the University of Constantinople in the palaces of Magnaura promoted an interest in learning, particularly in Greek studies. Patriarch Photius was irritated because "Hellenic studies are preferred over spiritual works". Michael Psellos thought it a compliment when Emperor Romanos III praised him for being raised "in the Hellenic way" and a weakness for Emperor Michael IV for being completely devoid of a Hellenic education, while Anna Komnene claimed that she had "carried the study of Hellenic to the highest pitch". Also, commenting on the orphanage her father founded, she stated that "there could be seen a Latin being trained, and a Scythian studying Hellenic, and a Roman handling Hellenic texts and an illiterate Hellene speaking Hellenic correctly". In this case we reach a point where the Byzantines are Romans on the political level but Hellenic by descent. Eustathius of Thessalonica disambiguates the distinction in his account of the sack of Thessaloniki in 1185 by referring to the invaders with the generic term "Latins", encompassing all adherents to the Roman Catholic Church, and the "Hellenes" as the dominant population of the empire.

After the fall of Constantinople to the Crusaders, Greek nationalism accentuated. Niketas Choniates insisted on using the name "Hellenes", stressing the outrages of the "Latins" against the "Hellenes" in the Peloponnese and how the Alfeios River might carry the news to the barbarians in Sicily, the Normans. Nikephoros Blemmydes referred to the Byzantine emperors as Hellenes, and Theodore Alanias wrote in a letter to his brother that "the homeland may have been captured, but Hellas still exists within every wise man". The second Emperor of Nicaea, John III Doukas Vatatzes, wrote in a letter to Pope Gregory IX about the wisdom that "rains upon the Hellenic nation". He maintained that the transfer of the imperial authority from Rome to Constantinople was national and not geographic, and therefore did not belong to the Latins occupying Constantinople: Constantine's heritage was passed on to the Hellenes, so he argued, and they alone were its inheritors and successors. His son, Theodore II Laskaris, was eager to project the name of the Greeks with true nationalistic zeal. He made it a point that "the Hellenic race looms over all other languages" and that "every kind of philosophy and form of knowledge is a discovery of Hellenes […]. What do you, O Italian, have to display?"

The evolution of the name was slow and did not replace the "Roman" name completely. Nikephoros Gregoras named his historical work Roman History. Emperor John VI Kantakouzenos, a great supporter of Greek education, in his own memoirs always refers to the Byzantines as "Romans", yet, in a letter sent by the Mamluk sultan, An-Nasir Hasan, referred to him as "Emperor of the Hellenes, Bulgars, Sassanians, Vlachs, Russians, Alanians" but not of the "Romans". Over the next century, George Gemistos Plethon pointed out to Constantine XI Palaiologos that the people he leads are "Hellenes, as their race and language and education testifies", while Laonicus Chalcondyles was a proponent of completely substituting "Roman" terminology for "Greek" terminology. Constantine Palaiologos himself in the end proclaimed Constantinople the "refuge for Christians, hope and delight of all Hellenes". On the other hand, the same Emperor in his final speech before the Empire's demise called upon his audience to rally to the defenses by characteristically referring to them as "descendants of Hellenes and Romans", most possibly as an attempt to combine Greek national sentiment with the Roman tradition of the Byzantine crown and Empire, both highly respected elements in his subjects' psyche at that moment.

== Byzantines (Βυζαντινοί) ==
By the time of the fall of the Western Roman Empire most easterners had come to think of themselves as Christians and, more than ever before, as Romans. Although they may not have liked their government any more than they had previously, the Greeks among them could no longer consider it foreign, run by Latins from Italy. The word Hellene itself had already begun to mean a pagan rather than a person of Greek race or culture. Instead eastern Greeks overwhelmingly used the self-identifying term Rhomaios, "Roman".

As early as the 7th century, "Byzantine" was occasionally used to refer to various Greek-speaking monastic communities who resided in Rome, although they did not necessarily originate from the religious tradition or ecclesiastical jurisdiction of Constantinople.

The term "Byzantine Empire" is commonly understood to have been introduced in 1557, about a century after the Fall of Constantinople, by German historian Hieronymus Wolf, who introduced a system of Byzantine historiography in his work Corpus Historiae Byzantinae in order to distinguish ancient Roman from medieval Greek history without drawing attention to their ancient predecessors. According to Anthony Kaldellis, an Athenian Laonikos Chalkokondyles in the mid 15th century who advocated a neo-Hellenic identity of the Romans, was the first to use the term in this way. Several authors adopted his terminology, but it remained relatively unknown. English historians preferred to use Roman terminology (Edward Gibbon used it in a particularly belittling manner), while French historians preferred to call it Greek. The term reappeared in the mid-19th century and has since dominated completely in historiography, even in Greece, despite objections from Constantine Paparregopoulos, Gibbon's influential Greek counterpart, that the empire should be called Greek. Few Greek scholars adopted the terminology at that time, but it became popular in the second half of the 20th century.

== Hellenic continuity and Byzantine consciousness ==
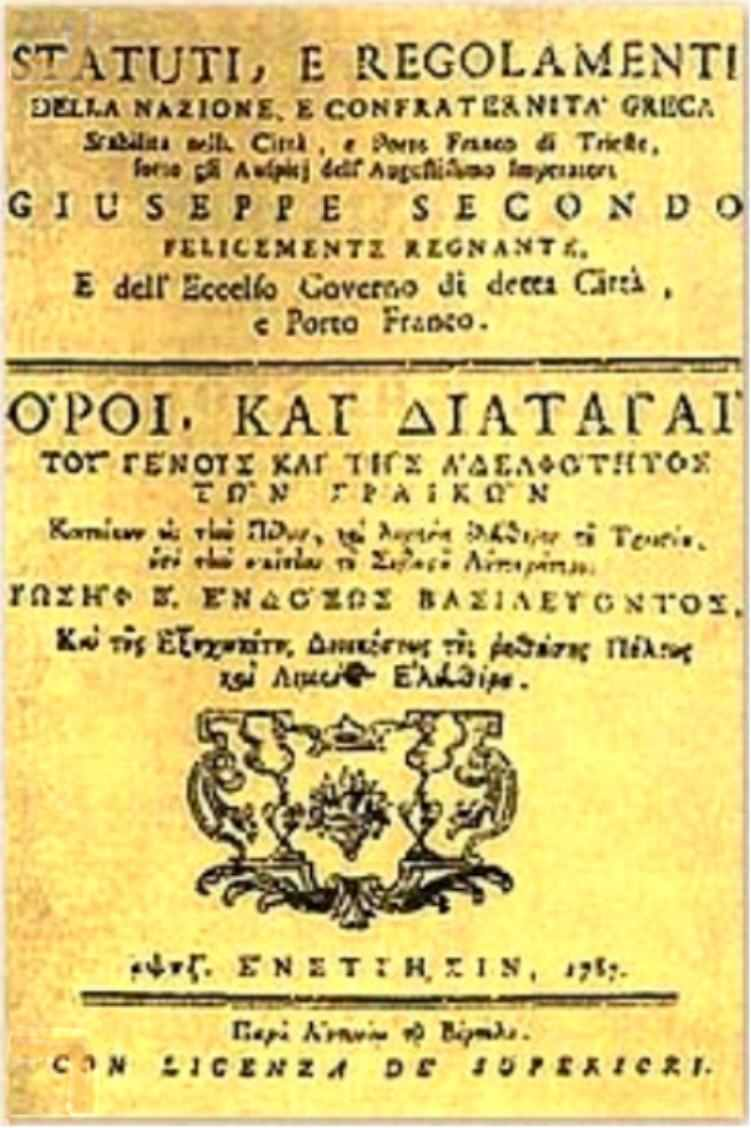
The first printed Charter of the Greek Community of Trieste, Italy 1787 – Archives of the Community of Trieste.

The "Byzantines" referred to themselves as Rhomaioi to retain both their Roman citizenship and their ancient Hellenic heritage. In fact, the overwhelming majority of the "Byzantines" themselves were also very conscious of their uninterrupted continuity with the ancient Greeks. Even though the ancient Greeks were not Christians, the "Byzantines" still regarded them as their ancestors. A common substitute for the term Hellene, other than Rhomaios, was the term Graikos (Γραικός), a term that was used often by the "Byzantines" (along with Rhomaios) for ethnic self-identification. Evidence of the use of the term Graikos can be found in the works of Priscus, a historian of the 5th century AD. He stated in one of his accounts that on an unofficial embassy to Attila the Hun, he had met at Attila's court someone who dressed like a Scythian but spoke Greek. When Priskos asked the person where he had learned the language, the man smiled and said that he was a Graekos by birth. Many other "Byzantine" authors speak of the Empire's natives as Greeks [Graikoi] or Hellenes such as Constantine Porphyrogennitos of the 10th century. His accounts discuss about the revolt of a Slavic tribe in the district of Patras in the Peloponnese. Constantine states that the Slavs who revolted first proceeded to sack the dwellings of their neighbors, the Greeks (ton Graikon) and then moved against the inhabitants of the city of Patras. Overall, ancient Hellenic continuity was evident throughout the history of the Eastern Roman Empire. The "Byzantines" were not merely a general Orthodox Christian populace that referred to themselves as merely "Romans". They used the term for legal and administrative purposes, but other terms were used to distinguish themselves ethnically. In short, the Greek inhabitants of the Eastern Roman Empire were very conscious of their ancient Hellenic heritage and could preserve their identity while they adapted to the changes that the world was undergoing.

== Contest between the names Hellene, Roman, and Greek ==
Following the Ottoman conquest of Constantinople and during Ottoman Greece a fierce ideological battle ensued regarding the three rival national names of the Greeks. This struggle may have settled down after the Greek War of Independence but was permanently resolved only recently in the 20th century after the loss of Asia Minor to the Turks.

The struggle reflected the diverging view of history between classicists and medievalists (katharevousa and demotic) in their attempt to define Greek nationality at a time without a Byzantine state to foster the movement. The concept of Hellene for a person of Greek origin was already well established from the late Middle Ages. However, for the majority of the population, especially those in rural areas away from urban centers, the dominant self-perception was still that of Romaioi and Graikoi. Scholar Rigas Feraios called "Bulgars and Arvanites, Armenians and Romans" to rise in arms against the Ottomans. General Makrygiannis recalled a friend asking him: "What say you, is the Roman State far away from coming? Are we to sleep with the Turks and awaken with the Romans?"

Preference for the term Greek (Γραικός) was exhibited by scholars such as Adamantios Korais, a renowned Greek classicist, who justified his selection in A Dialogue between Two Greeks: "Our ancestors used to call themselves Greeks but adopted afterwards the name Hellenes by a Greek who called himself Hellen. One of the above two, therefore, is our true name. I approved 'Greece' because that is what all the enlightened nations of Europe call us." Hellenes for Korais are the pre-Christian inhabitants of Greece.

The absence of a Byzantine state gradually led to the marginalization of the Roman name and allowed Hellene (Ἕλλην) to resurface as the primary national name. Dionysius Pyrrhus requests the exclusive use of Hellene in his Cheiragogy: "Never desire to call yourselves Romans, but Hellenes, for the Romans from ancient Rome enslaved and destroyed Hellas". The anonymous author of The Hellenic Realm of Law, published in 1806 in Pavia, Italy, speaks of Hellenes: "The time has come, O Hellenes, to liberate our home". The leader of the Greek War of Independence began his Declaration with a phrase similar to the above: "The time has come, O men, Hellenes". After the name was accepted by the spiritual and political leadership of the land, it rapidly spread to the population, especially with the onset of the Greek War of Independence where many naïve leaders and war figures distinguished between idle Romans and rebellious Hellenes. General Theodoros Kolokotronis in particular made a point of always addressing his revolutionary troops as Hellenes and invariably wore a helmet of ancient Greek style.

General Makrygiannis tells of a priest who performed his duty in front of the "Romans" (civilians) but secretly spied on the "Hellenes" (fighters). "Roman" almost came to be associated with passiveness and enslavement, and "Hellene" brought back the memory of ancient glories and the fight for freedom. Eyewitness historian Ambrosius Phrantzes writes that while the Turkish authorities and colonists in Niokastro had surrendered to the advancing Greek army, reportedly, shouts of defiance were made that led to their massacre by the mob: "They spoke to the petty and small Hellenes as 'Romans'. It was as if they called them 'slaves'! The Hellenes not bearing to hear the word, for it reminded of their situation and the outcome of tyranny […]"

The citizens of the newly independent state were called "Hellenes" making the connection with ancient Greece all the more clear. That in turn also fostered a fixation on antiquity and negligence for the other periods of history, especially the Byzantine Empire, for an age that bore different names and was a devisor to different and in many ways more important legacies. The classicist trend was soon balanced by the Greek Great Idea that sought to recover Constantinople and reestablish the Byzantine Empire for all Greeks. As the Prime Minister, Ioannis Kolettis, proclaimed in front of Parliament in 1844, "The Kingdom of Greece is not Greece; it is only part of it, a small and poor part of Greece […]. There are two great centers of Hellenism. Athens is the capital of the Kingdom. Constantinople is the great capital, the City, dream and hope of all Greeks."

On 8 October 1912, during the First Balkan War, the island of Lemnos became part of Greece. The Greek navy under Rear Admiral Pavlos Kountouriotis captured it after a brief action without any casualties from the Ottoman garrison, who were returned to Anatolia. Peter Charanis, born on the island in 1908, and later a professor of Byzantine history at Rutgers University, recounts when the island was liberated and Greek soldiers were sent to the villages and stationed themselves in the public squares. Some of the children ran to see what Greek soldiers looked like; "What are you looking at?", one of them asked; "At Hellenes", the children replied; "Are you not Hellenes yourselves?", a soldier retorted; "No, we are Romans", the children replied; which might seem odd at a first glance, but indicates that in parts of Greece the locals self-identified as a continuation of the Eastern, Greek-speaking part of the Roman Empire (Ρωμιοί), along with their Greek identity.

== See also ==
- Greeks
- Gringo, a Spanish derivation of griego that came to mean "Anglophone North American" and related concepts
- Hellen
- Adjectival and demonymic forms of place names in Greco-Roman antiquity

== Sources ==
- Nagy, Gregory (2014). "The Heroic and the Anti-Heroic in Classical Greek Civilization". Cambridge, Massachusetts: President and Fellows of Harvard College. Archived from the original on 2016-05-20.

== Bibliography ==
=== In English ===
- John Romanides, "Romanity, Romania, Rum", Thessalonike, 1974
- Steven Runciman, "Byzantine and Hellene in the 14th century"

=== In other languages ===
- Panagiotis Christou, The Adventures of the National Names of the Greeks, Thessalonike, 1964
- Antonios Hatzis, Elle, Hellas, Hellene, Athens, 1935–1936
- J. Juthner, Hellenen und Barbaren, Leipzig, 1923
- Basileios A. Mystakides, Αι λέξεις Έλλην, Γραικός (Γραικύλος), Ρωμαίος (Γραικορρωμαίος), Βυζαντινός, Μωαμεθανός, Τούρκος, Istanbul, 1920
- Ioannis Kakrides, Ancient Greeks and Greeks of 1821, Athens, 1956
- A. Rambeau, "L'empire Grecque au X' siecle"
