= Candybus =

Greek mythological figure

In Greek mythology, Candybus (Ancient Greek: Κάνδυβος, romanized: Kándubos) was a Phthian prince. Candybus was the son of the King Deucalion and probably Pyrrha, daughter of the Titan Epimetheus and Pandora. He was the possible brother of Hellen, Amphictyon, Pandora II, Protogeneia, Thyia and Melantho.

Stephanus of Byzantium reports a mythic tradition that the town of Kandyba in Lycia was named after Candybus.
