= Neonus =

In Greek mythology, Neonus (Ancient Greek: Νεώνου, romanized: Neōnos or Néonos, lit. 'new' or 'young') was a Phthian prince as the son of King Hellen of Thessaly, the son of Deucalion, the Hellenic progenitor. His mother was possibly the nymph Orseis (Othreis), and thus he was probably the brother to Aeolus, Dorus, Xuthus and Xenopatra. Neonus was the father of Dotus, eponym of Dotium in Thessaly.
