= Graeci =

Graeci may refer to:

- the Latin name of the Ancient Greeks
- the Modern Latin name of the (modern) Greeks
- the tribe of the Graecians, one of the Boeotian tribes which established colonies in southern Italy

== See also ==
- Names of the Greeks
- Graia
- Graecus
- Griko people (Grecanici)
