= Xenopatra =

Figure in Greek mythology

In Greek mythology, Xenopatra (Ancient Greek: Ξενοπάτρα, romanized: Xenopátra, lit. 'she who has a foreign father'), also called Chthonopatra (Ancient Greek: Χθονοπάτρα, romanized: Khthonopátra, lit. 'she who has a subterranean father') was a Phthian princess who later on became the queen of Locris.

== Biography ==
Xenopatra was the daughter of King Hellen of Thessaly, the eponym of the Hellenes. Her mother was the oread Orseis (Othreis), and sister to Aeolus, Dorus, Xuthus and probably Neonus.

Chthonopatra married her uncle King Amphictyon of Locris and by him mothered Physcus, his successor. Other possible children of the couple were King Itonus of Iton and an unnamed daughter who bore Cercyon by Poseidon, and Triptolemus by Rarus.
