= Phthia (mythology) =

In Greek mythology, Phthia (/ˈθaɪə/; Greek: Ancient Greek: Φθία or Φθίη, romanized: Phthía) may refer to the following individuals:

- Phthia, the nymph mother of Dorus by Hellen, the progenitor of the Hellenes, according to Vitruvius's De architectura.
- Phthia, the beloved of Apollo, by whom she became the mother of Dorus, Laodocus, and Polypoetes.
- Phthia, daughter of Phoroneus and mother of Achaeus by the god Zeus. This version is to some extent confirmed by Aelian, who relates that Zeus assumed the shape of a dove to seduce a certain Phthia.
- Phthia, a Theban princess who was one of the Niobids, children of Amphion, king of Thebes, and Niobe, daughter of Tantalus.
- Phthia or Clytia, the concubine of Amyntor who falsely accused her stepson, Phoenix, of seduction causing his father to blind him.
