= Helmetheus =

Greek demigod

In Greek mythology, Helmetheus was the son of Zeus and Pyrrha, daughter of Epimetheus and Pandora, or of Prometheus. In some accounts, the son of the god and Pyrrha was Hellen instead.
