= Orseis =

Water deity in Greek mythology

In Greek mythology, Orseïs (/ɔːrsiːɪs/; Ancient Greek: Ὀρσηΐς, romanized: Orsêis, lit. 'stirred-up', 'rousing' or 'awakening') was the water-nymph (Naiad) of a spring in Thessalia, Greece, and the mythical ancestor of the Greeks. According to M. L. West, her name may have been corrupt for "Othryis", who he suggests was a nymph of Mount Othrys.

According to the Library, Orseis married Hellen, son of Deucalion and Pyrrha and brother of Pandora, the legendary eponymous ancestor of the Greeks. Their sons, Dorus, Xuthus, and Aeolus, according to Hesiod's Eoiae or Catalogue of Women together with the sons of Pandora, Graecus, Magnes and Makedon with Zeus, became the founders of the seven primordial tribes of Hellas (Graecians, Magnetes, Makedones, Dorians, Achaeans, Ionians, and Aeolians). In some accounts, Xenopatra was also called the daughter of Hellen and Orseis.
