= Selinus (mythology) =

In Greek mythology, Selinus (/ˈsɛlɪnəs/; Ancient Greek: Σελινούς, romanized: Selinoús, Modern: Σελινούντας Selinoúntas) was a native king of Aegalea (Ἀιγάλεια Aigáleia) in Achaea. The kingdom which used to exist is located in the present-day Aigio.

== Mythology ==
Selinus who being at war with Ion, offered him his only daughter Helice and proposed to adopt him as son and successor. Ion agreed to this and on his father-in-law's death, he became king of the Aegialians.
