= Hesione (Oceanid) =

According to the 6th century BC mythographer Acusilaus, Hesione (/hɪˈsaɪ.əniː/; Ancient Greek: Ἡσιονη) was the daughter of Oceanus, the wife of Prometheus and the mother of Deucalion. That she was a daughter of Oceanus and wife of Prometheus, was also repeated in Aeschylus' Prometheus Bound.
