= Dorus (son of Hellen) =

Son of Hellen, eponym of the Dorians in Greek mythology

In Greek mythology, Dorus (Ancient Greek: Δῶρος, romanized: Dōros, lit. 'gift' or 'bounty') was the eponymous founder of the Dorians.

== Family ==
Each of Hellen's sons founded a primary tribe of Greece: Aeolus the Aeolians, Dorus the Dorians and Xuthus the Achaeans (from Xuthus's son Achaeus) and Ionians (from Xuthus's adopted son Ion, in truth a son of the god Apollo), aside from his sister Pandora's sons with Zeus. In the account of Hellanicus, Xenopatra was additionally counted as one of the children of Hellen and the oread Orseis (Othreis) and thus, technically the sister of Dorus. Another possible sibling of Dorus was Neonus who was called the son of Hellen and father of Dotus. In one version of the myth, Dorus was said to be born from Hellen and the nymph Phthia (maybe another for Orseis).

According to other writers, Dorus was the son of Protogenia and Zeus, thus probably the brother of Aethlius, Aetolus and Opus. Meanwhile, in the play Ion, he was counted as one of the legitimate sons (the other being Achaeus) of Xuthus and the Athenian princess Creusa, daughter of King Erechtheus. Lastly, in a rare account, Poseidon was said to have fathered Dorus.

Dorus was the father of Tectamus, Aegimius and Iphthime. The latter became the mother of the Satyrs Lycus, Pherespondus and Pronomus by Hermes.

== Mythology ==
In the Bibliotheke, "Dorus received the country over against Peloponnese and called the settlers Dorians after himself." He was said to have founded the small Dorian cities of Erineon, Boion, Kytinion and Pindos. According to Karl Kerenyi, the Dorians recalled that three times Heracles had aided their "oldest king", Aigimios, "under whom they had not yet emigrated to the Peleponnesos." Kerenyi's source is the Bibliotheca (II.7.7), who though he is late, was working with ancient materials lost to us.

Centuries later, the figure of Dorus was invoked by Diodorus Siculus in the common way to explain the presence in Crete during the historical period of Dorian cities of mixed population:

The third people to cross over to the island, we are told, were Dorians, under the leadership of Tectamus the son of Dorus; and the account states that the larger number of these Dorians was gathered from the regions about Olympus, but that a part of them consisted of Achaeans from Laconia, since Dorus had fixed the base of his expedition in the region about Cape Malea. And a fourth people to come to Crete and to become intermixed with the Cretans, we are told, was a heterogeneous collection of barbarians who in the course of time adopted the language of the native Greeks.

An important descendance of aristocratic clans, some of which survived into Classical times, was from Heracles. Diodorus invokes a son of Dorus in accounting for the mythic theme of the "return" of the Heracleidae:

The rest of the Heracleidae, they say, came to Aegimius, the son of Dorus, and demanding back the land which their father had entrusted to him, made their home among the Dorians.

== Interpretation ==
The eponymous figure of "Dorus" is a back-formation: all tribal groups have myths of an "original', whose name is the eponym of the tribe, even tribal eponyms in Genesis. The oldest are essentially eponyms of extended families, who were worshipped in archaic cults into Roman times. A man's name, Dōrieus, occurs in the Linear B tablets at Pylos, one of the regions invaded and subjected by the Dorians. Whether it had the ethnic meaning of "the Dorian" is unknown. Modern derivations of "Dorians" do not depend on a figure of Dorus: see Name of the Dorians.

== Genealogy of Hellenes ==
Genealogy

Iapetus	Clymene
Prometheus	Epimetheus	Pandora
Deucalion	Pyrrha
Hellen	Orseis
DORUS	Xuthus	Aeolus
Achaeus	Ion
Cretheus	Sisyphus	Athamas	Salmoneus	Deion	Magnes	Perieres
Canace	Alcyone	Pisidice	Calyce	Perimede
