= Saberdzneti =

Historical Georgian term for Ancient Greece

A royal charter of Prince Demetrius mentioning both berdzeni and saberdzneti, c. AD 1445-1452

Saberdzneti (Georgian: საბერძნეთი [sabeɾdznetʰi]) was an ambiguous geographic term used in medieval and early modern Georgian historical sources to refer to Ancient Greece, the Roman Empire and the Byzantine Empire, while berdzeni (Georgian: ბერძენი) was a name for people who lived in those states. Later the name saberdzneti came to mean simply "Greece" and berdzeni "the Greek". Saberdzneti literally means "land of the berdzens" (i.e. "land of the Greeks.)

== Etymology ==
The ethnonym berdzeni is presumed to be related to the pre-Greek Pelasgians (Πελασγοί, Pelasgoi), it being derived from the phonetical variant pel of the root ber. The dz of ber-dz-eni may be a variant of the Pel-as-goi, as s/z may have changed to dz in Georgian. This is also indicated by the existence of the stem bersen alongside berdzen in Georgian surnames like "Bersenadze".

There is also another theory that berdzeni was actually coined from the Georgian word "wise" brdzeni (Georgian: ბრძენი), thus saberdzneti would literally mean "land where the wise men live", possibly referring to the Ancient Greek philosophy. The same root is also adopted in Abkhazian and Greece is referred as barzentyla (Барзентәыла).

== See also ==
- Names of the Greeks
- Somkhiti

== Bibliography ==
- Metreveli, Roin (2008) The Georgian Chronicles, Artanuji Publishing
- Khintibidze, Elguja (1998) Designations of the Georgians and their etymology, Tbilisi State University
