= Physcus (mythology) =

Greek mythological figure

In Greek mythology, Physcus (Ancient Greek: Φύσκος, romanized: Physkos) or Physcius, was a king of Locris and son of Amphictyon and Chthonopatra and father of Locrus whom Locrians were named but initially they were called Physcians after Physcus. In some accounts, however, he was called the grandson of Amphictyon through Aetolus, his predecessor to the throne.
