= Echembrotus =

Ancient Greek lyricist and poet

Echembrotus (Greek: Ἐχέμβροτος) was an ancient Arcadian Greek lyricist and poet. According to Pausanias, Echembrotus offered a bronze tripod to Heracles when the latter won at the Amphictyonic Games.
