= Archinus (historian) =

Ancient Greek historian

Archinus (Ancient Greek: Ἀρχῖνος) was a historian of ancient Greece, who lived at an uncertain date, and who wrote a work on the history of Thessaly. This book, however, is now lost.
