= Pandora (daughter of Deucalion) =

Daughter of Deucalion and Pyrrha

In Greek mythology, Pandora (Ancient Greek: Πανδώρα, lit. 'all-gifted' or 'all-giving' from πᾶς 'all' and δῶρον 'gift'') was Phthian princess as the daughter of King Deucalion of Thessaly. She was named after her maternal grandmother, the more infamous Pandora.

== Mythology ==
Pandora's mother was Pyrrha, daughter of Epimetheus and Pandora. She was the sister of Hellen and Thyia. Her other possible siblings were Protogeneia, Pronoos, Orestheus, Marathonius, Amphictyon, Melantho (Melantheia) and Candybus.

According to the Hesiodic Catalogue of Women, Pandora was the mother of Graecus by the god Zeus.

"And in the palace Pandora the daughter of noble Deucalion was joined in love with father Zeus, leader of all the gods, and bare Graecus, staunch in battle."

It has been debated whether Pandora is here Deukalion’s daughter or his wife, or neither.

In some accounts, Pandora's children by Zeus were called Melaena and Pandorus.
