= Ion (play) =

Ancient Greek tragedy by Euripides

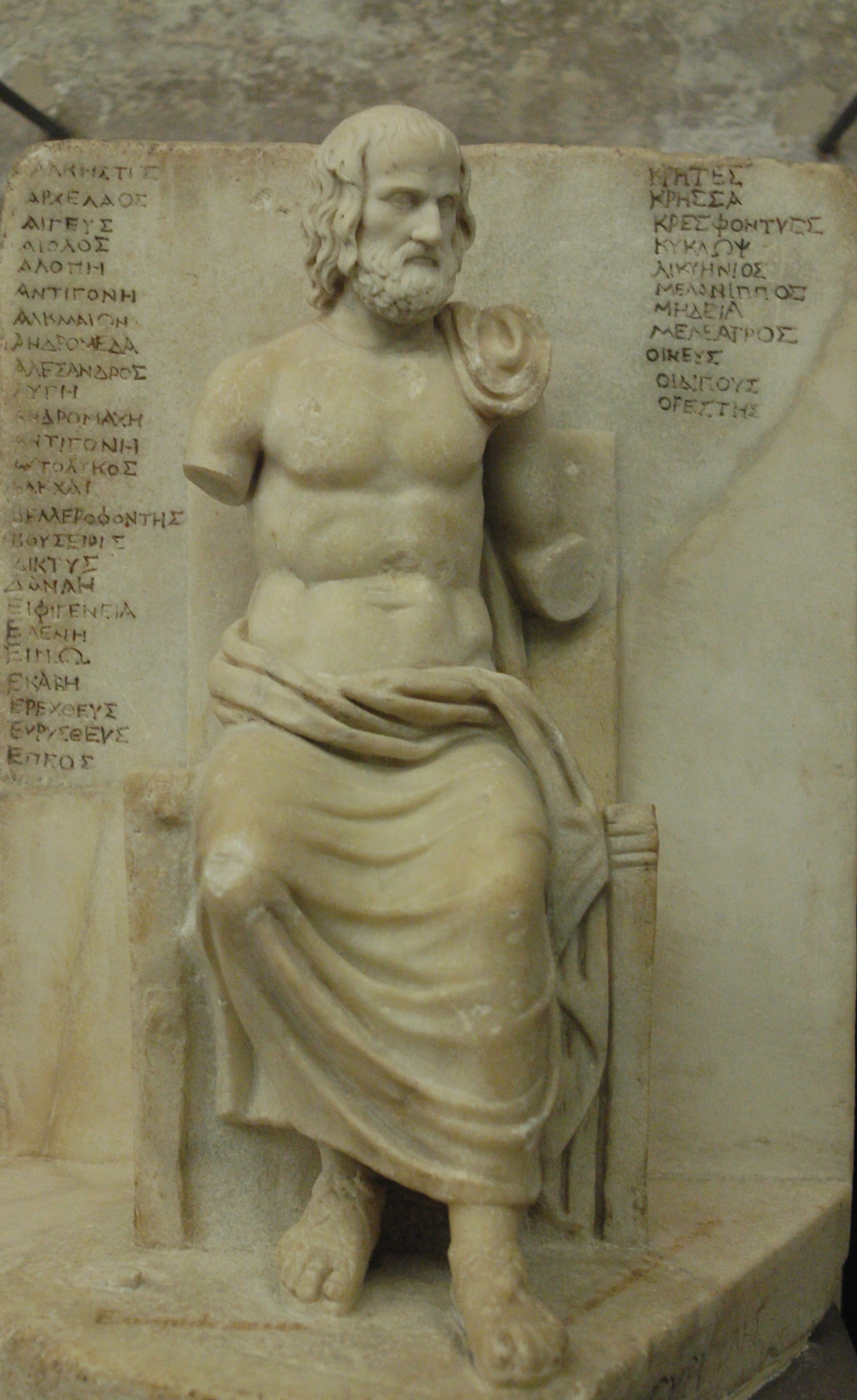
- Statue of Euripides
- Original language: Ancient Greek
- Written by: Euripides
- Chorus: Creusa's handmaidens
- Characters: Hermes; Ion; Creusa; Xuthus; Old Servant; Messenger; Pythia; Athena
- Genre: Tragedy
- Setting: before the Temple of Apollo at Delphi

Premiere
- Place: Athens

Ion (/ˈaɪɒn/; Ancient Greek: Ἴων, Iōn) is an ancient Greek tragedy by Euripides. On the subject of dating this work, no scholarly consensus exists; this is due to the fact that no certain reliable criterion that could potentially be utilised for this purpose has been found. Various possible dates have been proposed. Of these, the "dates most commonly proposed by modern scholarship are 418/7, 414/3 and 412". Central to the plot is the story of its namesake, Ion, a young and willing servant in Apollo's temple who inadvertently discovers his biological origins. Of equal import to the plot is the story of Creusa, Ion's mother, whose words and actions are heavily informed by the abuse she previously experienced at the hands of Apollo.

Euripides' retelling of this myth departs from the norm in that it calls the morality and superiority of the gods into question. Though the theme of individuals rising up against disasters that the Fates or the gods have wrought is oft-seen in tragedy, by explicitly challenging the notion that gods have a right to govern the destinies of human beings, Creusa and Ion depart from convention. In the end, however, Euripides takes a step back from this precipitous development: Creusa retracts her earlier criticism of Apollo, and the status quo is preserved.

== Background ==
Creusa, daughter of Erechtheus, was a noble native of Athens and daughter of the king. The god Apollo raped her in a cave; there she secretly gave birth to his son whom she intended to kill by exposure to the elements for fear of the terrible punishment she would receive at the hands of her parents for having a child apparently out of wedlock. Throughout her life only she knows of this secret. Many years later, near the end of childbearing age and so far unable to have a child with her husband Xuthus, a Thessalian and son of Aeolus, they traveled to Delphi to seek a sign from the oracles regarding whether there was any hope of their having any children in the future.

== Story ==
Outside the temple of Apollo at Delphi, Hermes recalls the time when Creusa, the daughter of Erectheus, was raped by Apollo in a cave at Long Rocks under the Acropolis. A boy—Ion—was born from that liaison. Apollo concealed her pregnancy from her father and Creusa secretly gave birth to the child, whom she placed in a basket along with the adornments she possessed (amongst them snakes of beaten gold, as was customary) and left for dead. Then, at Apollo's request, Hermes brought the child to Delphi, where he was taken in by a priestess. He says that from then until now, the boy has lived a respected life as a temple servant.

Hermes then goes on to describe Creusa's life. Creusa was married to the foreign-born Xuthus, son of Aeolus, the son of Zeus. Xuthus won Creusa by assisting the Athenians in a war against the Chalcidians. Their marriage has been childless thus far; thus, Xuthus and Creusa have come to Delphi to seek a remedy for this affliction. Hermes says that Apollo is directing events to this conclusion, and that he will give the boy to Xuthus, who will take him home to Athens where he will be recognised by his mother. He then calls the boy Ion, "his destined name".

Hermes steps into a wooded grove when Ion arrives to begin his morning chores. As Ion sweeps the steps of the temple with a broom of laurel, he sings the praise of the god who is like a father to him. His reveries are disturbed by birds which he shoos away with his arrows in order to keep the sacred temple clean, though not without a twinge of regret as he sees them as the gods' messengers.

The Chorus, consisting of Athenian maidens, arrives at the temple and marvels at the stonework depicting ancient legends. They identify themselves to Ion as servants of the Athenian rulers and soon spot their mistress arriving at the temple doors.

Creusa introduces herself to Ion as the daughter of Erectheus. Ion is impressed, as he is familiar with the old stories about her family. Ion's casual mention of Long Rocks startles Creusa but she reveals nothing of her past. She tells him that she has married a foreigner, Xuthus, who won her as a prize for helping the Athenians in battle. They are here to ask about having children. Ion introduces himself as an orphan slave who was brought up by the priestess of Apollo. When Creusa asks if he has ever tried to find his mother, he says he has no token of her. Moved by the thought of his mother, Creusa tells Ion that she has come in advance of her husband to question the oracle on behalf of "a friend" who had a child by Apollo, which she abandoned. She has come, she tells him, to ask the god if her friend's child is still alive. Relating to Ion that the child disappeared from the cave where her "friend" left him, she tells Ion that the child would be about his age had he survived. Ion warns her to abandon the inquiry, saying that no one would dare accuse the god of such a deed in his own temple. Seeing Xuthus approaching, Creusa asks Ion to reveal nothing of their conversation. Xuthus arrives and expresses confidence that he will receive good news from the oracle. He sends Creusa with laurel branches to make the rounds of the external altars and goes into the sanctuary. After they both leave, Ion questions how the gods, who punish evildoing among mortals, can engage in abusive behavior themselves. Before going off to finish his chores, he indignantly advises the gods not to sleep with mortal women just because they can.

While Xuthus is inside, the Chorus of Creusa's servants prays to Athena and Artemis, recalling the joys of fertility and raising children. Recalling the story of the daughters of Cecrops and Aglauros, they conclude that children born of mortals by gods are fated for ill-fortune.

Ion returns as Xuthus emerges from the inner sanctuary. He calls the young man "my boy" and rushes to embrace him. Ion is wary and at one point he even draws his bow. Xuthus explains that the god told him that the first person he encountered when he came out of the shrine would be his son. When Ion questions who his mother might be, Xuthus says that perhaps she was someone he met at a Bacchic festival. Ion accepts Xuthus as his father but thinks wistfully of the mother he longs to meet. Creusa's servants wish that their mistress could share in the happiness. Xuthus proposes that Ion come back to Athens with him, but the young man is reluctant to take on the role of "the bastard son of an imported father." He compares the happiness of kings to an outward façade of prosperity masking fear and suspicion within. When he says that he would prefer to remain a temple attendant, Xuthus breaks off the conversation with "Enough of that. You must learn to be happy." Ion will come back with him as a house guest. When the time is right, he will arrange for Ion to be his heir. As he leaves to offer sacrifice, he names the boy Ion because he met him 'coming out' and tells him to arrange for a banquet to celebrate his departure from Delphi. He enjoins the chorus to reveal nothing of what has happened. Ion reluctantly agrees to go to Athens, but he longs to meet his unknown mother and fears he will not be well received.

The Chorus of Creusa's maids, suspecting treachery, pray for the death of Xuthus and Ion, whom they consider interlopers.

Creusa returns to the temple gate accompanied by her father's elderly tutor. Sensing that something is amiss, Creusa presses her maids to tell what they know. They reveal that Apollo gave Ion to Xuthus as a son while she will remain childless. The old tutor speculates that Xuthus discovered that Creusa was barren, sired the child by a slave, and gave him to a Delphian to raise. The old man tells Creusa that she must not allow the bastard child of a foreigner to inherit the throne. Instead, she must kill her husband and his son to prevent further treachery. He volunteers to help her. The servants pledge their support.

With her hopes in the god completely dashed, Creusa finally reveals what Apollo did to her, in a sung monody. She describes how he came to her as she was gathering flowers — a shining god who grabbed her by the waist and took her into a cave as she screamed for her mother. She says she was seduced, taking responsibility for her part in the seduction. She gave birth to a child and left him in the cave in the hope that the god would save him. Now she realizes that Apollo has completely abandoned her and their son.

The tutor encourages her to avenge herself by torching Apollo's temple, but she refuses. When she also refuses to kill her husband, the tutor unexpectedly suggests that she kill the young man. Creusa agrees, telling him that she has two drops of the Gorgon's blood that Erichthonius received from Athena. One drop kills and the other cures. She gives the deadly drop to the tutor to poison Ion during his farewell banquet, then they go their separate ways.

The Chorus prays for the plot's success, fearing that if it fails, Creusa will take her own life before allowing a foreigner to take over Athenian rule. They condemn the ingratitude of Apollo who gave preference to Xuthus over their mistress.

Following the Chorus' song, a messenger arrives, announcing that the plot has failed. He tells them (in a typically Euripidean messenger speech) that a Delphian mob is searching for Creusa to stone her to death. He says that Xuthus arranged for Ion to host a banquet under a tent, while he went off to offer sacrifice. The messenger describes the banquet tent, in a detailed ekphrasis. The messenger then reports how the plan went awry. Ingratiating himself with the crowd, the old tutor took on the role of wine steward and slipped the poison into Ion's cup as planned; but just as they were about to drink, someone made an ill-omened remark and Ion called on the company to pour out their cups as libations. When a flock of doves drank the spilled wine, all survived except the dove that drank the wine intended for Ion. The bird died in torment, revealing the plot. Ion grabbed the old tutor, found the vial and forced a confession from him. Then he successfully brought a charge of murder against Creusa at a hastily assembled court of Delphian leaders, rallying the entire city to search for her.

The Chorus sings a song anticipating their death at the hands of the Delphian mob.

Creusa then enters, saying that she is pursued by the Delphian mob. On the advice of her servants, she seeks sanctuary at the altar of Apollo, just as Ion arrives with a sword in hand. Each accuses the other of treachery. He says that she tried to murder him; she says that he tried to overturn the house of her fathers.

As Ion rails against the religious laws that protect convicted assassins, the Pythian priestess emerges from the temple. Advising Ion to go to Athens with his father, she shows him the basket he was found in. She has kept it secret all these years, but now that Ion's father has been revealed, she can give it to him to help in the search for his mother. Ion vows to travel all of Asia and Europe to search for her. She advises him to start his search in Delphi. As he peers into the basket, Ion marvels at the fact that it shows no sign of age or decay. Recognizing the basket, Creusa knows immediately that Ion is her son. She leaves the altar to embrace him even at the risk of her life. When she announces that she is his mother, Ion accuses her of lying. In an attempt to discredit her, he challenges her to name what is in the basket. There is an unfinished weaving with a Gorgon in the center fringed with serpents like an aegis; a pair of golden serpents in memory of Erichthonius, fashioned into a necklace; and a wreath of olive branches which ought to still be green. Convinced, Ion flies to Creusa's welcoming arms — her long-dead son has been returned alive.

Embracing her son and heir, Creusa expresses her joy. There is no more unlikely chance than this, Ion tells her than to discover that you are my mother. I am childless no longer, she tells him. When Ion questions her about his father, Creusa tells him with some embarrassment that he is the son of Apollo and that she reluctantly abandoned him in a deserted cave to be the prey of birds. As they celebrate their change of fortune, Ion takes her aside to ask if perhaps she conceived him with a mortal father and made up the story about Apollo. After all, Apollo said that Xuthus was his father.

Convinced that only Apollo can tell him for certain who his father is, Ion starts toward the sanctuary to confront the god, but he is stopped by the appearance of the goddess Athena on the roof of the temple (an instance of deus ex machina). Athena explains that Apollo thought it best not to show himself in person lest he be blamed for what happened, but sent Athena in his place to tell Ion that he is Ion's father and Creusa is his mother. Athena tells Ion that Apollo brought them together on purpose, to provide Ion with a proper place in a noble house. Apollo had planned for Ion to discover the truth after he went to Athens, but since the plot was discovered, he decided to reveal the secret here to prevent either of them from killing the other. Athena then tells Creusa to establish Ion on the ancient Athenian throne where he will be famous throughout Hellas. He and his half brothers will establish the Ionian, Dorian, and Achaean races of Greeks (thus going from being an orphan to ultimately becoming a patriarch of his people). Apollo, the goddess concludes, has managed all things well. As she leaves, Athena orders them not to tell Xuthus but to let him think that Ion is his son.

The testimony of the goddess convinces Ion, who affirms that Apollo is his father and Creusa his mother. For her part, Creusa swears that she will now praise Apollo because he gave her son back. The gods may be slow to action, Athena observes, but in the end, they show their strength. Despite the power of the play and the characters' very poignant situation, the ending seems somewhat tacked on, perhaps deliberately so on Euripides' part in order not to upset his audience by challenging too strongly the traditional order of gods and humans. It is quite contrary to the overall thrust of the play up to that point.

== Reception ==
Although Ion is not among Euripides' most revered plays, some critics have cited its unconventionality in the context of Greek tragedy as making it unique, while its direct questioning of a god's actions and role in human affairs makes it all the more radical. In The Classical Quarterly, Spencer Cole defended another scholar's argument that the play is "self-referential to a degree unparalleled anywhere else in Euripides," and wrote that Ion was the work in which the tragedian's will to innovate was most evident.

== Translations ==
| Translator | Year | Form | Refs |
|---|---|---|---|
| Potter, R. | 1781 | verse | |
| Coleridge, E.P. | 1891 | prose | |
| Way, A.S. | 1912 | verse | |
| Hadas, M. and McLean, J. | 1936 | prose | |
| Doolittle, H. (H.D.) | 1937 | verse | |
| Vellacott, P. | 1954 | verse | |
| Murray, G. | 1954 | verse | |
| Willetts, R.F. | 1958 | verse | |
| Lan, D. | 1994 | | |
| W. S. Di Piero | 1996 | verse | |
| Gamel, Mary-Kay | 1996 | | |
| Roche, Paul | 1998 | verse | Signet Classics |
| Kovacs, David | 1999 | prose | |
| Waterfield, Robin | 2001 | | Oxford's World Classics |
| Poulton, M. | 2004 | | |
| Theodoridis, George | 2006 | prose | |
| Svarlien, Diana Arnson | 2016 | | |
| Vinero, Brian | 2024 | rhymed verse | |
