= Orestheus =

Two individuals in Greek mythology

Orestheus (Ancient Greek: Ὀρεσθεύς derived from oresteros "mountainous" from όρος oros "mountain, hill"), in Greek mythology, was a name attributed to two individuals.

- Orestheus, a king of the Ozolian Locrians in Aetolia. He was the son of Deucalion and Pyrrha, the legendary progenitors of the Greek race. Orestheus was the brother of Pronous and Marathonius. His dog was said to have given birth to a piece of wood which he concealed in the earth. In the spring, a vine grew forth from it, from the sprouts of which (Greek ὅζοι ozoi "branches") Orestheus derived the name of his people.
- Orestheus, an Arcadian prince as one of the 50 sons of the impious King Lycaon either by the naiad Cyllene, Nonacris or by unknown woman. He was the reputed founder of Arcadian Oresthasion, which is said afterwards to have been called Oresteion, from Orestes.
