= Ionians =

Ancient Greek tribe

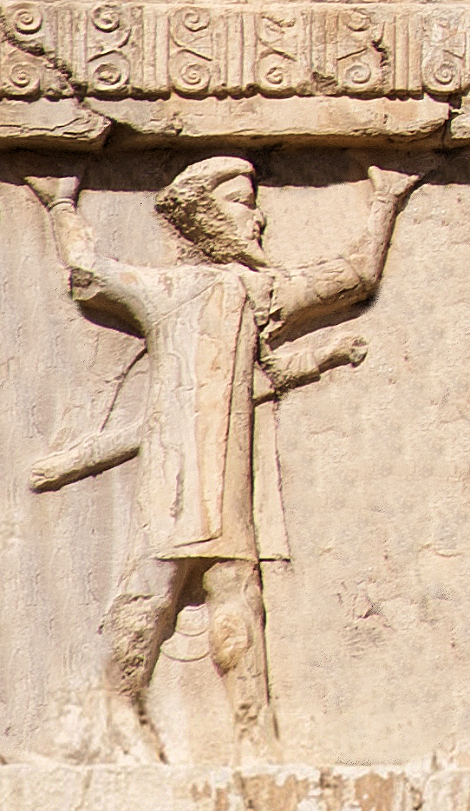
Ionian soldier (Old Persian cuneiform 𐎹𐎢𐎴, Yaunā) of the Achaemenid army, circa 480 BCE. Relief on the tomb of Xerxes I.

The Ionians (/aɪˈoʊniənz/; Greek: Ἴωνες, Íōnes, singular Ἴων, Íōn) were one of the four major tribes that the Greeks considered themselves to be divided into during the ancient period; the other three being the Dorians, Aeolians, and Achaeans. The Ionian dialect was one of the three major linguistic divisions of the Hellenic world, together with the Dorian and Aeolian dialects.

When referring to populations, "Ionian" defines several groups in Classical Greece. In its narrowest sense, the term referred to the region of Ionia in Asia Minor. In a broader sense, it could be used to describe all speakers of the Ionic dialect, which in addition to those in Ionia proper also included the Greek populations of Euboea, the Cyclades, and many cities founded by Ionian colonists. Finally, in the broadest sense it could be used to describe all those who spoke languages of the East Greek group, which included Attic.

The foundation myth which was current in the Classical period suggested that the Ionians were named after Ion, son of Xuthus, who lived in the north Peloponnesian region of Aigialeia. When the Dorians invaded the Peloponnese they expelled the Achaeans from the Argolid and Lacedaemonia. The displaced Achaeans moved into Aigialeia (thereafter known as Achaea), in turn expelling the Ionians from Aigialeia. The Ionians moved to Attica and mingled with the local population of Attica, and many years later emigrated to the coast of Asia Minor founding the historical region of Ionia.

Unlike the austere and militaristic Dorians, the Ionians are renowned for their love of philosophy, art, democracy, and pleasure – Ionian traits that were most famously expressed by the Athenians. The Ionian school of philosophy, centered on Miletus, was characterized by a focus on non-supernatural explanations for natural phenomena and a search for rational explanations of the universe, thereby laying the foundation for scientific inquiry and rational thought in Western philosophy.

== Etymology ==
The etymology of the word Ἴωνες or Ἰᾱ́ϝoνες is uncertain. Frisk isolates an unknown root, *Ia-, pronounced *ya-. There are, however, some theories:

- From a Proto-Indo-European onomatopoeic root *wi- or *woi- expressing a shout uttered by persons running to the assistance of others; according to Pokorny, *Iāwones could mean "devotees of Apollo", based on the cry iḕ paiṓn uttered in his worship; the god was also called iḕios himself.
- From an unknown early name of an eastern Mediterranean island population represented by ḥꜣw-nbwt, an ancient Egyptian name for the people living there.
- From a Proto-Indo-European root *uiH-, meaning "power."

== History of the name ==
Unlike "Aeolians" and "Dorians", "Ionians" appears in the languages of different civilizations around the eastern Mediterranean and as far east as Han China. They are not the earliest Greeks to appear in the records; that distinction belongs to the Danaans and the Achaeans. The trail of the Ionians begins in the Mycenaean Greek records of Crete.

=== Mycenaean ===
A fragmentary Linear B tablet from Knossos (tablet Xd 146) bears the name i-ja-wo-ne, interpreted by Ventris and Chadwick as possibly the dative or nominative plural case of *Iāwones, an ethnic name. The Knossos tablets are dated to 1400 or 1200 B.C. and thus pre-date the Dorian dominance in Crete, if the name refers to Cretans.

The name first appears in Greek literature in Homer as Ἰάονες, iāones, used on a single occasion of some long-robed Greeks attacked by Hector and apparently identified with Athenians, and this Homeric form appears to be identical with the Mycenaean form but without the *-w-. This name also appears in a fragment of the other early poet, Hesiod, in the singular Ἰάων, iāōn.

=== Biblical ===
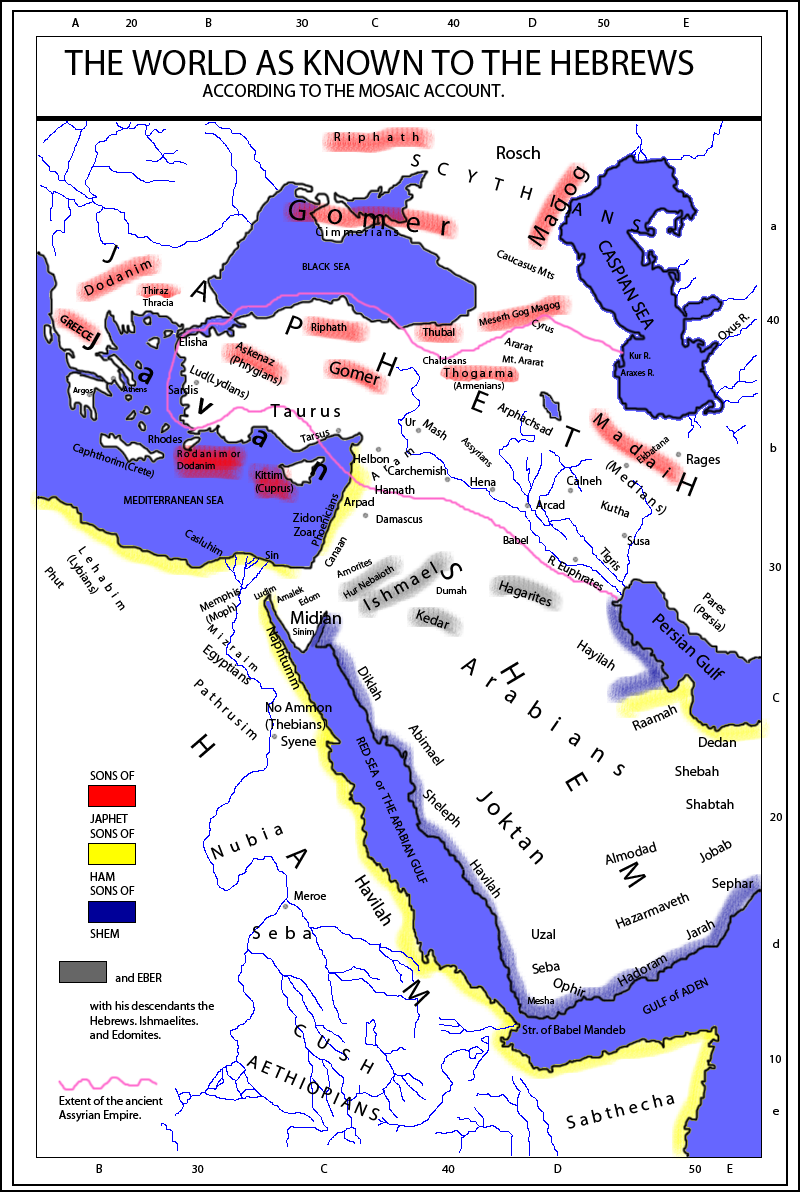
The world as known to the Hebrews; the name Yavan used for the Greek-speaking world

In the Book of Genesis of the English Bible, Javan, known in Hebrew as Yāwān and in plural Yəwānīm, is a son of Japheth. Javan, meaning 'Greek', is believed nearly universally by Bible scholars to represent the Ionians, corresponding to the Greek Ion, and to serve as a name for the Greeks and Macedonians. The term is also found in other ancient literature; the Yevana (Ionians) aligned with the Hittites against Egypt, while the Yauna of the Persian records corresponds to the Ionians of Asia Minor.

Additionally, though less surely, Japheth may be related linguistically to the Greek mythological figure Iapetus. The locations of the biblical tribal countries have been the subjects of centuries of scholarship and yet remain open questions to various degrees. The final chapter of the Book of Isaiah, who lived in the 8th century BC, contains what may be a hint by listing "the nations ... that have not heard my fame" including Javan immediately after "the isles afar off". These isles may be considered as an apposition to Javan or the last item in the series. If the former, the expression is typically used of the population of the islands in the Aegean Sea.

=== Assyrian ===
Some letters of the Neo-Assyrian Empire in the 8th century BC record attacks by what appear to be Ionians on the cities of Phoenicia. For example, a raid by the Ionians (Neo-Assyrian Akkadian: 𒅀𒌋𒈾𒀀𒀀, romanized: Yaunāya) on the Phoenician coast is reported to Tiglath-Pileser III in a letter from the 730s BC discovered at Nimrud.

The Assyrian word, which is preceded by the country determinative (𒆳), has been reconstructed as *Yaunāya. More common is 𒅀𒀀𒈠𒉡 (ia-a-ma-nu), 𒅀𒈠𒉡 (ia-ma-nu) and 𒅀𒄠𒈾𒀀𒀀 (ia-am-na-a-a) with the country determinative, reconstructed as Yamānu. Sargon II related that he took the latter from the sea like fish and that they were from "the sea of the setting sun." If the identification of Assyrian names is correct, at least some of the Ionian marauders came from Cyprus:

Sargon's Annals for 709, claiming that tribute was sent to him by 'seven kings of Ya (ya-a'), a district of Yadnana whose distant abodes are situated a seven-days' journey in the sea of the setting sun', is confirmed by a stele set up at Citium in Cyprus 'at the base of a mountain ravine ... of Yadnana.'

=== Iranian ===
Ionians appear in a number of Old Persian inscriptions of the Achaemenid Empire as Yaunā (𐎹𐎢𐎴𐎠), a nominative plural masculine, singular Yauna; for example, an inscription of Darius on the south wall of the palace at Persepolis includes in the provinces of the empire "Ionians who are of the mainland and (those) who are by the sea, and countries which are across the sea; ...." At that time the empire probably extended around the Aegean to northern Greece.

=== Indic ===
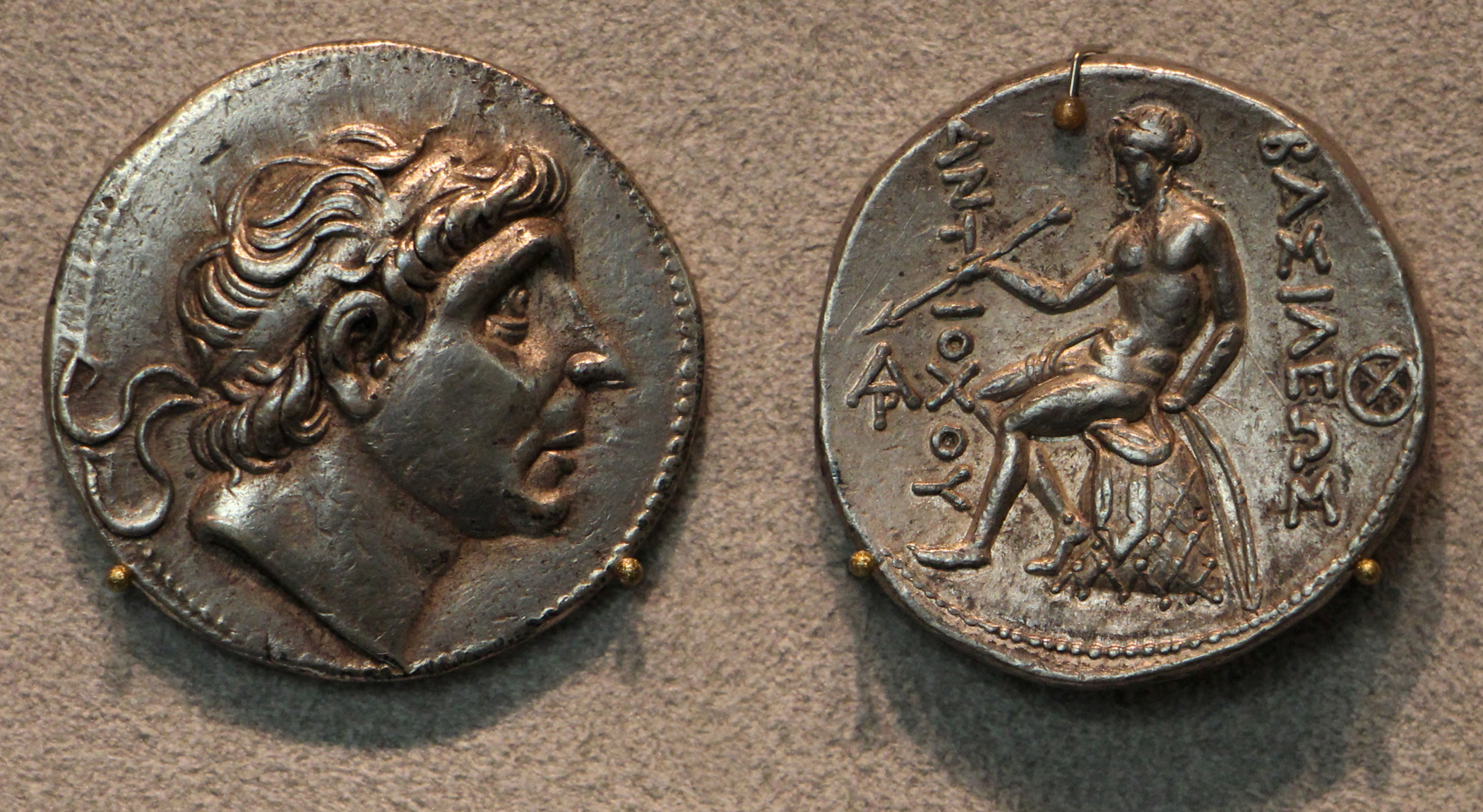
The Seleucid king Antiochos ("Aṃtiyako Yona Rājā" ("The Yona king Antiochos")) is named as a recipient of Ashoka's medical treatments, together with his Hellenistic neighbours, in the Edicts of Ashoka (circa 250 BCE).

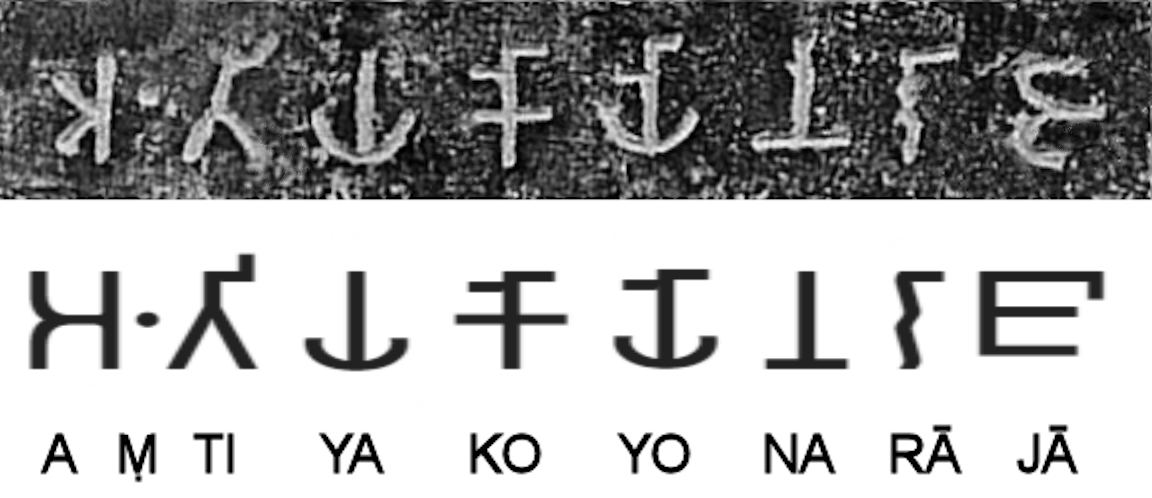
"Aṃtiyako Yona Rājā" ("The Greek king Antiochos"), mentioned in Major Rock Edict No.2, here at Girnar. Brahmi script.

Inspired by Achaemenid Iranians, Ionians appear in Indic literature and documents as Yavana (𑀬𑀯𑀦) and Yona (𑀬𑁄𑀦). In documents, these names refer to the Indo-Greek Kingdoms: the states formed by the Macedonian Alexander the Great and his successors on the Indian subcontinent. The earliest such documentation is the Edicts of Ashoka. The Thirteenth Edict is dated to 260–258 BC and directly refers to the "Yonas".

=== Chinese ===
Dayuan' (or Tayuan; Chinese: 大宛; pinyin: Dàyuān; lit. 'Great Ionians'; Middle Chinese: dâi^{C}-jwɐn < LHC: dɑh-ʔyɑn) is the Chinese exonym for a country that existed in Ferghana valley in Central Asia, described in the Chinese historical works of Records of the Grand Historian and the Book of Han. It is mentioned in the accounts of the Chinese explorer Zhang Qian in 130 BCE and the numerous embassies that followed him into Central Asia. The country of Dayuan is generally accepted as relating to the Ferghana Valley, controlled by the Hellenistic polis Alexandria Eschate (modern Khujand, Tajikistan), which can probably be understood as "Greco-Fergana city-state" in English language.

=== Other languages ===
Most modern Western Asian languages use the terms "Ionia" and "Ionian" to refer to Greece and Greeks. That is true of:

- Hebrew (Yavan (יָוָן) 'Greece' / Yevani fem. Yevania 'a Greek'),
- Armenian (Hunastan (Հունաստան) 'Greece' / Huyn (հույն) 'a Greek'),
- and the Classical Arabic words (al-Yūnān (الْيُونَان) 'Greece' / Yūnānī (يُونَانِي) fem. Yūnāniyya (يُونَانِيَّ) pl. Yūnān (يُونَان) 'a Greek', probably from Aramaic Yawnānā) are used in most modern Arabic dialects including Egyptian and Palestinian
- as well as being used in modern Persian (Yūnānestān (يونانستان) 'Greece' / Yūnānī (یونانی) pl. Yūnānīhā/Yūnānīyān 'Greeks')
- and Turkish too via Persian (Yunanistan 'Greece' / Yunan 'a Greek person' pl. Yunanlar 'Greek people').

== Ionic language ==
Map of ancient Greek dialects

Ionic Greek was a subdialect of the Attic–Ionic or Eastern dialect group of Ancient Greek. The Ionic group traditionally comprises three dialectal varieties that were spoken in Euboea (West Ionic), the northern Cyclades (Central Ionic), and from c. 1000 BC onward in Asiatic Ionia (East Ionic), where Ionian colonists from Athens founded their cities. Ionic was the base of several literary language forms of the Archaic and Classical periods, both in poetry and prose. The works of Homer (The Iliad, The Odyssey, Homeric Hymns) and of Hesiod were written in a literary form of the Ionic dialect called Homeric Greek or Epic Greek. Ionic was eventually supplanted by the Attic dialect which had become the dominant dialect of the Greek world by the 5th century BC.

== Pre-Ionic Ionians ==
The literary evidence of the Ionians leads back to mainland Greece in Mycenaean times before there was an Ionia. The classical sources seem determined that they were to be called Ionians along with other names even then. This cannot be documented with inscriptional evidence, and yet the literary evidence, which is manifestly at least partially legendary, seems to reflect a general verbal tradition.

=== Herodotus ===
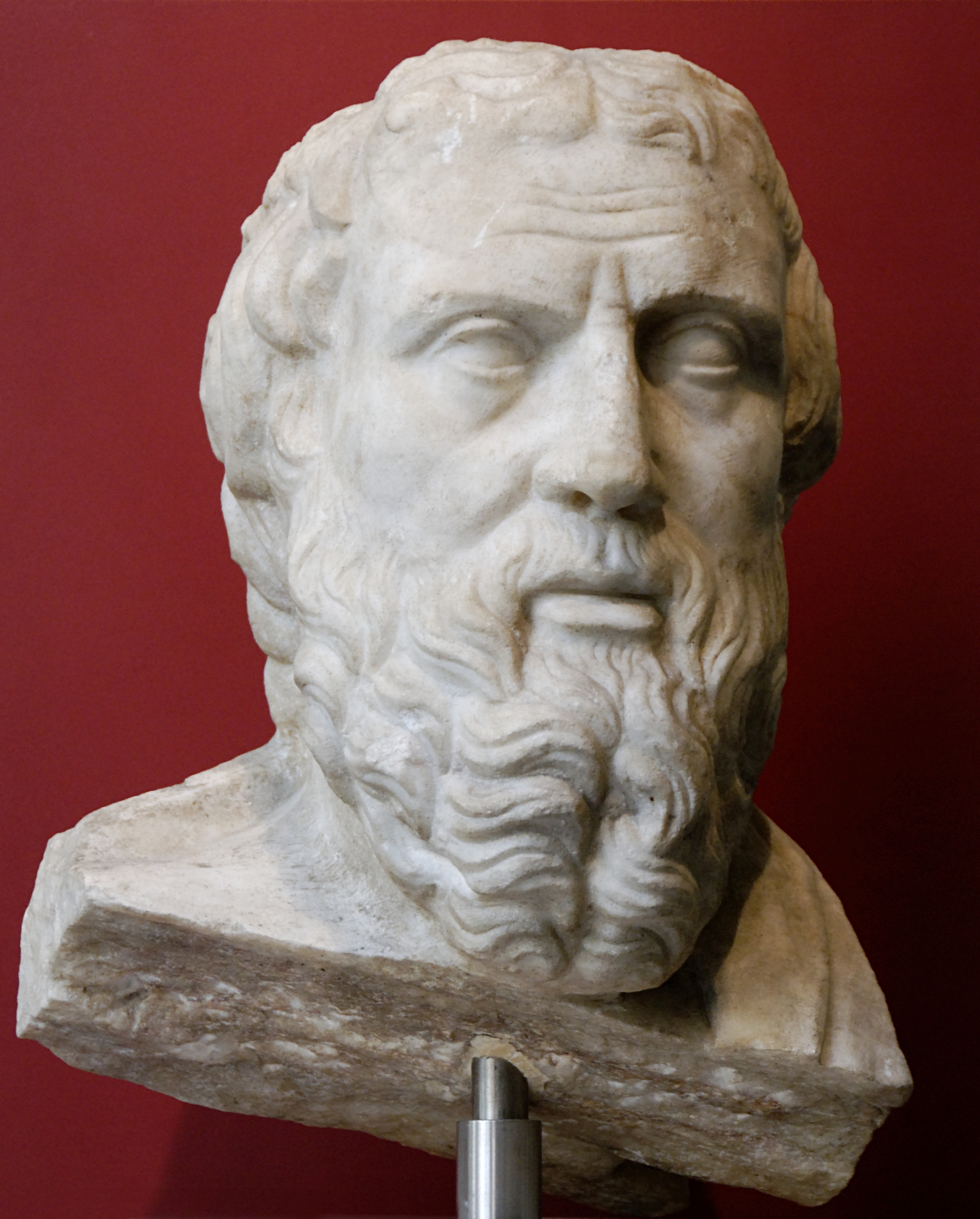
Portrait of Herodotus, Roman copy of a 4th century Greek original

Herodotus of Halicarnassus asserts:

all are Ionians who are of Athenian descent and keep the feast Apaturia.

He further explains:

The whole Hellenic stock was then small, and the last of all its branches and the least regarded was the Ionian; for it had no considerable city except Athens.

The Ionians spread from Athens to other places in the Aegean Sea: Sifnos and Serifos, Naxos, Kea and Samos. But they were not just from Athens:

These Ionians, as long as they were in the Peloponnesus, dwelt in what is now called Achaea, and before Danaus and Xuthus came to the Peloponnesus, as the Greeks say, they were called Aegialian Pelasgians. They were named Ionians after Ion the son of Xuthus.

Achaea was divided into 12 communities originally Ionian: Pellene, Aegira, Aegae, Bura, Helice, Aegion, Rhype, Patrae, Phareae, Olenus, Dyme and Tritaeae. The most aboriginal Ionians were of Cynuria:

The Cynurians are aboriginal and seem to be the only Ionians, but they have been Dorianized by time and by Argive rule.

=== Strabo ===
In Strabo's account of the origin of the Ionians, Hellen, son of Deucalion, ancestor of the Hellenes, king of Phthia, arranged a marriage between his son Xuthus and the daughter of king Erechtheus of Athens. Xuthus then founded the Tetrapolis ("Four Cities") of Attica, a rural district. His son, Achaeus, went into exile in a land subsequently called Achaea after him. Another son of Xuthus, Ion, conquered Thrace, after which the Athenians made him king of Athens. Attica was called Ionia after his death. Those Ionians colonized Aigialia changing its name to Ionia also. When the Heracleidae returned the Achaeans drove the Ionians back to Athens. Under the Codridae they set forth for Anatolia and founded 12 cities in Caria and Lydia following the model of the 12 cities of Achaea, formerly Ionian.

== Ionian School of philosophy ==
During the 6th century BC, Ionian coastal towns, such as Miletus and Ephesus, became the focus of a revolution in traditional thinking about Nature. Instead of explaining natural phenomena by recourse to traditional religion/myth, the cultural climate was such that men began to form hypotheses about the natural world based on ideas gained from both personal experience and deep reflection. These men—Thales and his successors—were called physiologoi, those who discoursed on Nature. They were skeptical of religious explanations for natural phenomena and instead sought purely mechanical and physical explanations. They are credited as being of critical importance to the development of the 'scientific attitude' towards the study of Nature. According to physicist Carlo Rovelli, the work of the Ionian school produced the "first great scientific revolution" and the earliest example of critical thinking, which would come to define Greek, and subsequently modern, thought.
