= Xuthus =

Noble in Ancient Greek Mythology

In Greek mythology, Xuthus (/ˈz(j)uːθəs/; Ancient Greek: Ξοῦθος, romanized: Xoûthos) was a Phthian prince who later became a king of Peloponnesus. He was the founder (through his sons) of the Achaean and Ionian nations.

== Family ==
Xuthus was a son of King Hellen of Thessaly and the nymph Orseis; and brother of Dorus, Aeolus, Xenopatra and probably Neonus. He had two sons, Ion and Achaeus, and a daughter named Diomede by Creusa, the Athenian daughter of King Erechtheus. Euripides's play, Ion, provided an unusual alternate version, according to which Xuthus was the son of Aeolus and Ion was in fact been begotten on Xuthus's wife Creusa by Apollo. Variations of Xuthus' paternity regarding Ion are that he is the true father, that he has been tricked by Apollo and Creusa, or that he has deluded himself into believing he is the father, but the most common version is that that he adopted Ion at the command of the Oracle of Delphi. Xuthus will later father Dorus and Achaeus with Creusa, though Dorus is normally presented as Xuthus's brother.

== Mythology ==
According to the Hesiodic Catalogue of Women on the origin of the Greeks, Hellen's three sons Dorus, Xuthus (with his sons Ion and Achaeus) and Aeolus, comprised the set of progenitors of the major ancient tribes that formed the Greek nation.

In the play Ion, Xuthus and Creusa visited the Oracle at Delphi to ask the god if they could hope for a child, at which point they are told they already have a child, Ion, who was father by Apollo and mothered by Creusa, though Creusa had forgotten her son due to the trauma of being raped by Apollo. The Oracle at Delphi tells the couple that Ion is Xuthus' son and that Creusa's family should adopt him as Athenian. This makes Creusa so angry she tries to murder her stepson, but she fails. It is at this point the Creusa finds the crib that young Ion slept in and realizes she is his mother. Despite Ion being adopted, Xuthus is proud to be a father and introduces Ion as his legitimate son to Athens.

== Genealogy of Hellenes ==
Genealogy

Iapetus	Clymene
Prometheus	Epimetheus	Pandora
Deucalion	Pyrrha
Hellen	Orseis
Dorus	XUTHUS	Aeolus
Achaeus	Ion
Cretheus	Sisyphus	Athamas	Salmoneus	Deion	Magnes	Perieres
Canace	Alcyone	Pisidice	Calyce	Perimede
