= Achaeus (son of Xuthus) =

Ancient Greek mythological progenitor of the Achaeans

In Greek mythology, Achaeus or Achaios (/əˈkiːəs/; Ancient Greek: Ἀχαιός Akhaiós) was a son of Xuthus and Creusa, and the brother of Ion as well as the grandson of Hellen. According to Pausanias, he was the father of Archander and Architeles, who travelled from Phthiotis to Argos and each married daughters of Danaus.

== Mythology ==
The Achaeans regarded him as the author of their race, and derived from him their own name as well as that of Achaia, which was formerly called Aegialus. When his uncle Aeolus in Thessaly, whence he himself had come to Peloponnesus, died, he went there and made himself master of Phthiotis, which now also received from him the name of Achaia.

== Genealogy of Hellenes ==
Genealogy

Iapetus	Clymene
Prometheus	Epimetheus	Pandora
Deucalion	Pyrrha
Hellen	Orseis
Dorus	Xuthus	Aeolus
ACHAEUS	Ion
