= Ion (mythology) =

Mythical son of Apollo

A figure from the west pediment of the Parthenon identified as Ion, next to a fragment associated with Creusa. Circa 430s BC, Acropolis Museum.

In Greek mythology, Ion (/ˈaɪ.ɒn/; Ancient Greek: Ἴων, romanized: Íōn) is the eponymous ancestor of the Ionians, an ancient Greek tribe. He is the son of the Athenian princess Creusa.

== Genealogy ==
According to the earliest known mythological accounts, including the Hesiodic Catalogue of Women, Ion was the legitimate son of Creusa, the daughter of the Athenian king Erechtheus, and her husband Xuthus. Euripides made Ion the illegitimate child of Creusa by the god Apollo.

Ion was the husband of Helice, the daughter of Selinus, king of Aegialia. Through her, he became the father of Bura. Later on, Ion built a city which he named after Helice.

== Mythology ==
=== Euripides’ Ion ===
One story of Ion is told in the tragedy play Ion by Euripides. Apollo had visited Creusa in a cave below Propylaea where she conceived Ion. When the princess gave birth to the child, she abandoned him in the same cave but his father Apollo asked Hermes to take Ion from his cradle. Ion was saved, raised and educated by a priestess of the Delphic Oracle. When the boy had grown, and Xuthus and Creusa came to consult the oracle about the means of obtaining an heir, the answer was, that the first human being which Xuthus met on leaving the temple should be his son. Xuthus met Ion, and recognized him as his son but, in fact, Apollo was giving him Ion as an adoptive son. Creusa, thinking the boy to be a son of her husband by a former beloved while she was childless, caused a cup to be presented to the youth, which was filled with the poisonous blood of a dragon.

However, her plot was discovered, for as Ion, before drinking, poured out a libation to the gods, a pigeon which drank of it died on the spot. Creusa thereupon fled to the altar of the god. Ion dragged her away, and was on the point of killing her, when a priestess interfered, explained the truth, and showed that Ion was the son of Creusa. The mother and son thus reconciled, but Xuthus was not let into the secret. The latter, however, was satisfied after receiving a promise that he should become a father, namely of Dorus and Achaeus.

=== Ionian tradition ===
The inhabitants of Aegialus, on the northern coast of the Peloponnese, were likewise Ionians, and among them another tradition was current. Ion was the son of Xuthus (rather than Apollo in this account) who after being expelled from Thessaly or Attica was brought to the area during the reign of king Selinus. After his father’s death, Ion was on the point of marching against the Aegialeans, when Selinus offered him his only child Helice in marriage, as well as to adopt him as his son and successor. It so happened that the proposal found favour with Ion, and on the death of King Selinus he succeeded to the throne. He called the city he founded in Aegialus Helice (the modern Eliki) in honour of his wife and made it the capital of the kingdom, and called the inhabitants Ionians after himself. This, however, was not a change of name, but an addition to it, for the folk were named Aegialian Ionians. By his wife, Helike, Ion became the father of Bura, eponym of the city of Bura. Later he took an expedition against Eleusis (now Elefsina) with the help of the Athenians and in the battle he was killed near Eleusis.

=== Attic tradition ===
Other traditions represent Ion as king of Athens between the reigns of Erechtheus and Cecrops; for it is said that his assistance was called in by the Athenians in their war with the Eleusinians, that he conquered Eumolpus, and then became king of Athens. He there became the father of four sons, Geleon (Teleon), Aegicores, Argades, and Hoples, according to whom he divided the Athenians into four classes or tribes, which derived their names from his sons: Hopletes (Hoplites), Teleonites (Geleontes), Aegicoreis, Argadeis (Ergadeis). After his death he was buried at Potamus.

=== Other stories ===
According to some accounts, Ion was the father of Ellops, founder of Ellopia, and possibly Aïclus and Cothus as well. These last two founded the Euboean towns of Eretria and Cerinthus, respectively.

Ion was also believed to have founded a primary tribe of Greece, the Ionians. He has often been identified with Javan, who is mentioned in the Hebrew Bible as the ancestor of the Greek people, but in the Bible, Javan is a son of Noah's son Japheth. The earlier Greek form of the name was *Ἰάϝων "Iáwōn", which, with the loss of the digamma, later became Ἰάων Iáōn, or plural Iáones, as seen in epic poetry. In addition, Dionysius Periegetes, Dionysius the Voyager, of Alexandria, in his Description of the Known World ver. 416 mentions a river in Arcadia called Iaon. This river Iaon is further alluded to in Hesiod's Hymns of Callimachus, Hymn to Jupiter 22. This river has also been connected to the earlier forms of the name.

== Genealogical chart ==
Genealogy of Hellenes

Prometheus
Dorus
Tectamus	Aegimius

Clymene	Epimetheus
Deucalion	Pyrrha
Hellen
Xuthus
Achaeus	Ion

Pandora
Aeolus
Makednos	Magnes

== See also ==
- Yona – covers other names for the Greeks derived from Ion and the Ionians, found from the Near East to India
