= Amphictyon =

Mythical character

In Greek mythology, Amphictyon (Ancient Greek: Ἀμφικτύων, romanized: Amphiktyon; pronounced /æmˈfɪkti.ɒn/, am-FIK-tee-uhn or am-FIK-tee-on) was a king of Thermopylae and later Athens. In one account, he was the ruler of Locris. He is also said to have been the first to dedicate the city of Athens to it's patron deity, Athena.

== Etymology ==
The name of Amphictyon is a back-formation from Amphictyons, plural, from Latin Amphictyones, from Greek Amphiktyones, Amphiktiones, literally, "neighbors" or "those dwelling around" from amphi- + -ktyones, -ktiones (from ktizein to found); akin to Sanskrit kṣeti he dwells, kṣiti abode, Avestan shitish dwelling, Armenian šen inhabited, cultivated.

== Genealogy ==
Amphictyon was said to be the second son of Deucalion and Pyrrha. Other accounts state that he was to be a son of Hellen, rather than his brother akin in the first account. There was also a tradition that he was autochthonous (born from the earth).

Amphictyon married an unnamed daughter of King Cranaus of Athens. Amphictyon had a son, Itonus, who engaged in a romantic union with the nymph Melanippe, and became the father of Boeotus, Iodame and Chromia. He also had a daughter, never mentioned by name; this woman engaged in a union with Poseidon to then become the mother of Cercyon of Eleusis, and engaged in a union with Rarus to be the mother of Triptolemus.

Some accounts added that Amphictyon, when the brother of Hellen, engaged in a romantic union with Chthonopatra, and had another son, Physcus. Others stated that Physcus was the grandson of Amphictyon through Aetolus. In this late account, the kingdom of Locris was ruled from Amphictyon to Aetolus, then Physcus and eventually, Locrus who gave his name to the land.

== Mythology ==
One account related that during the reign of King Cranaus, Deucalion, who founded and ruled over Lycoreia in Mt. Parnassus, was said to have fled from his kingdom during the great flood with his sons Hellen and Amphictyon, and seek refuge to Athens. Later on, the latter became king of Thermopylae and brought together those living round about the temple and named them Amphictyons, and sacrificed on their behalf. While ruling in his new kingdom, Amphictyon's brother Hellen emigrated to Phthiotis where he became the ruler.

Eventually, Amphictyon deposed Cranaus and proclaimed himself king of Athens. Amphictyon ruled the kingdom for 10, or in some accounts, 12 years and founded the Amphictyonic League which traditionally met at Thermopylae in historical times. During his rule, Dionysus was supposed to have visited him in Athens and taught him how to mix water with wine in the proper proportions. Amphictyon was later on dethroned by Erichthonius, another autochthonous king of Athens.

Regnal titles
Preceded by Cranaus	King of Athens; 10 years	Succeeded by Erichthonius

== See also ==
- Amphictyonic league, or Amphictyony, an ancient religious association of tribes
