= Hellen =

Mythological progenitor of the Greeks

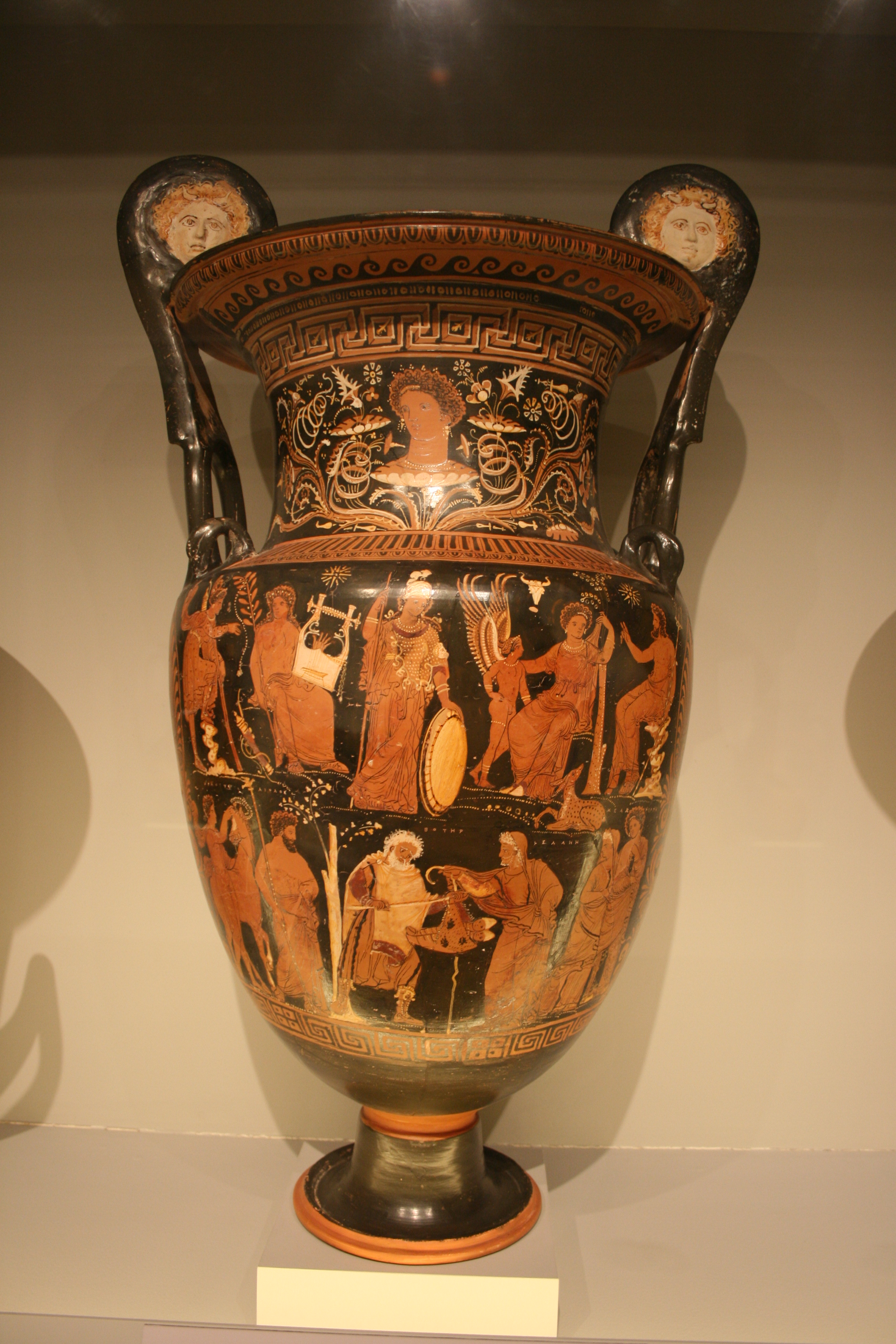
Hellen (to the right), being presented with the twins Aeolus and Boeotus by a shepherd, in a depiction of the story of Melanippe from Euripides' lost play Melanippe Wise, on an Apulian volute krater, dating from the late fourth century BC.

In Greek mythology, Hellen (/ˈhɛlɪn/; Ancient Greek: Ἕλλην, romanized: Héllēn) is the eponymous progenitor of the Hellenes. He is the son of Deucalion (or Zeus) and Pyrrha, and the father of three sons, Dorus, Xuthus, and Aeolus. He is considered to be the ancestor of the Greek peoples.

== Family ==
The Catalogue of Women (sixth century BC?) is a fragmentary poem attributed to Hesiod; the work is structured around a large genealogy of mortals, Hellen's family being described in Book 1 of the poem. According to a scholion on Apollonius of Rhodes' Argonautica, Hellen, in the poem, is called the son of Pyrrha, by either Deucalion, or alternatively, by Prometheus (who is called the father of Deucalion in the same passage). The latter parentage, however, it seems was not a part of the Catalogue, but rather a mistake on the part of the scholion. A scholion on the Odyssey similarly calls Hellen a son of Deucalion and Pyrrha, giving his siblings as Amphictyon, Protogeneia, and Melanthea (Melantho). The scholion, however, also states that "some say that Hellen was the son of Zeus by birth but was said to be the son of Deucalion", leading M. L. West to consider Hellen's real father in the Catalogue to in fact be Zeus, and Deucalion only, in West's words, his "nominal father".

Plutarch, in his Moralia, quotes a passage from the Catalogue in which Hellen is the father of three sons, Dorus, Xuthus, and Aeolus. He does not, however, give the source of the passage; it is instead the Byzantine poet John Tzetzes who attributes it to the Catalogue. Though no mother is specified in the passage, West suggests that she was one "Othryis", the nymph of Mount Othrys, based upon the mothers given by Apollodorus and a scholion on Plato's Symposium (see below).

A scholion on Thucydides' History of the Peloponnesian War attributes to Hecataeus (c. 550 BC – c. 476 BC) a very different genealogy of Hellen, in which he is not the son of Deucalion but rather the grandson, being the son of one "Pronous", himself the son of Deucalion, alongside "Orestheus" and "Marathonius". According to a scholion on Plato's Symposium citing Hellanicus (fl. late fifth century BC), Hellen "was born to Deukalion and Pyrrha, or according to some, to Zeus and Pyrrha", and was the father, by "Othreis", of Dorus, Xuthus, Aeolus, and in addition a daughter, named Xenopatra.

Conon (before 444 BC – after 394 BC), in his Narrations, similarly considers Hellen to be the son of Deucalion, and the father of Dorus, Xuthus, and Aeolus, though he also notes that "some" say he is the son of Zeus. A scholion on Pindar, in contrast, makes Deucalion the brother of Hellen (rather than the father), and them both sons of Prometheus.

Vitruvius (c. 80–70 BC – after c. 15 BC), in his De architectura, calls Dorus the son of Hellen by the "nymph Phthia", while Dionysius of Halicarnassus (c. 60 BC – after 7 BC) apparently considered Amphictyon to be Hellen's son (usually Hellen's brother).

Hyginus (c. 64 BC – AD 17), in his Fabulae, at one point calls Hellen the son of Zeus by Pyrrha, while later, he is listed among the sons of Poseidon, where he is called his son by Antiope (the daughter of Aeolus, who is usually Hellen's descendant), and the brother of Boeotus.

According to the mythographer Apollodorus (first or second century AD), Hellen's parents are Deucalion and Pyrrha, and his siblings Amphictyon and Protogeneia, or according to "some", his parents are Zeus and Pyrrha. Apollodorus, similarly to the Catalogue and other sources, calls him the father of Dorus, Xuthus and Aeolus; however, he specifies the nymph Orseis (rather than Othreis) as their mother.

According to the Byzantine chronicler John Malalas (c. 491 – 578), Hellen was the son of "Picus Zeus", and the father (rather than son) of Deucalion. According to Stephanus of Byzantium (fl. 6th century AD), the historian Archinus had Hellen as the father of one "Neonus", father of "Dotus", the latter of which gave his name to Dotium in Thessaly.

== Progenitor and eponym of the Hellenes ==
Hellen was Thessalian. Homer, in the part of the Iliad known as the Catalogue of Ships, mentions the Hellenes (Ἕλληνες) as a small tribe in Thessalic Phthia, among those commanded by Achilles. Similarly, according to a scholion on Apollonius of Rhodes, Hecataeus and "Hesiod" considered Deucalion's descendants to be Thessalian. According to Thucydides, Achaea Phthiotis, as the birthplace of Hellen, was the home of the Hellenes; he says that before Hellen the name "Hellas" (Ἑλλάς) didn't exist, but rather there were various tribes which went under different names, particularly "Pelasgian". It was only when Hellen and his sons "grew strong in Phthiotis" that they allied with various cities in war and these cities, one by one, through their association with Hellen and his sons, came to be called "Hellenes", though it was a long time before the name came to be applied to all.

== Melanippe Wise ==
Though primarily genealogical in importance, Hellen does feature briefly in Euripides' lost play Melanippe Wise (c. 420 BC). In the play, Melanippe, the daughter of Aeolus (and thus the granddaughter of Hellen), becomes by Poseidon the mother of twins, Aeolus and Boeotus. They are placed in a cowshed, leading Aeolus to think they are the "unnatural offspring of a cow", and Hellen convinces Aeolus to burn the twins. This story is depicted on an Apulian volute krater dating to the late 4th century BC, in which a shepherd shows the twins to Hellen, in the presence of Melanippe, Aeolus, and Aeolus' son Cretheus.

== Genealogical chart ==
Hellen's genealogy

Iapetus	Clymene
Prometheus	Epimetheus	Pandora
Deucalion	Pyrrha
HELLEN	Orseis
Dorus	Xuthus	Aeolus
Achaeus	Ion
Cretheus	Sisyphus	Athamas	Salmoneus	Deion	Magnes	Perieres
Canace	Alcyone	Pisidice	Calyce	Perimede

== See also ==
- Names of the Greeks
