= Pyrrha =

Daughter of Epimetheus and Pandora in Greek mythology

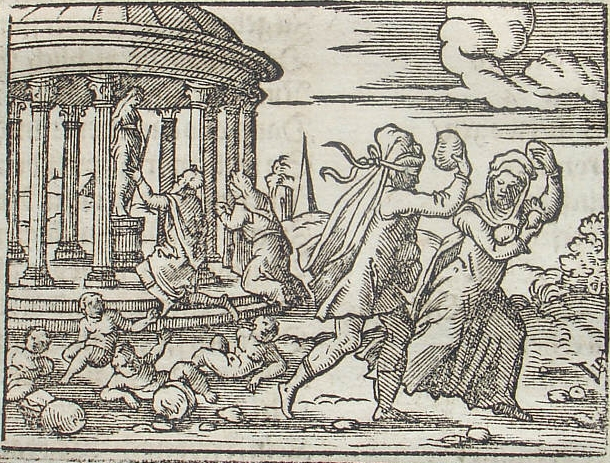
16th-century woodcut by Virgil Solis, illustrating lines 347–415 of Ovid's Metamorphoses

In Greek mythology, Pyrrha (/ˈpɪrə/; Ancient Greek: Πύῤῥα, romanized: Púrrha, lit. 'fiery') is the daughter of Epimetheus and Pandora, or of Prometheus.

== Etymology ==
In Latin, the word pyrrhus means red from the Greek adjective πυρρός, purrhos, meaning "flame coloured", or simply "red", referring in particular to people with red hair, as Pyrrha is described by both Horace and Ovid.

== Family ==
Pyrrha was the wife of Deucalion. The pair had three sons – Hellen, Amphictyon, Orestheus – and three daughters – Protogeneia, Pandora and Thyia. According to some accounts, the parents of Hellen or Helmetheus were Pyrrha and Zeus.

== Mythology ==
When Zeus decided to end the Bronze Age with the great deluge, Pyrrha and her husband, Deucalion, were the only survivors. Even though he was imprisoned, Prometheus who could see the future and had foreseen the coming of this flood, told his son, Deucalion, to build an ark and, thus, they survived. During the flood, they landed on Mount Parnassus, the only place spared by the flood.

Once the deluge was over and the couple were on land again, Deucalion consulted the oracle of Themis about how to repopulate the earth. He was told to throw the bones of his mother behind his shoulder. Deucalion and Pyrrha understood the "mother" to be Gaia, the mother of all living things, and the "bones" to be rocks. They threw the rocks behind their shoulders, which soon began to lose their hardness and change form. Their mass grew greater, and the beginnings of human form emerged. The parts that were soft and moist became skin, the veins of the rock became people's veins, and the hardest parts of the rocks became bones. The stones thrown by Pyrrha became women; those thrown by Deucalion became men.

The story of Deucalion and Pyrrha is also retold in the Roman poet Ovid's famous collection Metamorphoses. In this retelling, Jove (the Roman equivalent of Zeus) takes pity on the couple, recognizing them to be devout worshipers. He parts the clouds and ends the deluge specifically to save Deucalion and Pyrrha, who are floating aimlessly on a raft. When the storm has cleared and the waters have subsided, Deucalion and Pyrrha are taken aback by the desolate wreckage of the land, and understand that they are now responsible for repopulating the earth. Confused on how to carry out their destiny, they go to see the goddess Themis. Themis tells Pyrrha that she must cast the bones of her mother to successfully reproduce. Pyrrha is distraught at the idea of desecrating her mother's honor by digging up her bones, but Deucalion correctly reasons that Themis is referring to great mother earth, as Themis would never advise someone to commit a crime. Both Pyrrha and Deucalion throw a stone over their shoulder – Pyrrha's turning into a woman, Deucalion's turning into a man.

Once the land has been repopulated with humans, mother earth follows suit and begins to produce all other forms of life. Ovid uses this opportunity to inform his audience that heat and water are the sources of all life, "because when heat and moisture blend in due balance, they conceive: these two, these are the origin of everything. Though fire and water fight, humidity and warmth create all things; that harmony".

== Sources ==
The first author to write about stones being transformed into people after the flood was the 6th-century BC logographer Acusilaus. Presumably, he was drawing on the similarity between the Greek words meaning “stone” and “people.” This motif was used in a number of comedies (notably by Epicharmus), none of which have survived, as well as in Ovid’s Metamorphoses. The Parian Chronicle dates Deucalion’s flood to 1528 BC, while early Christian historians, in their chronological calculations, placed it between the floods of Ogyges and Dardanus and dated it to a time after Noah’s flood; however, only the latter was regarded as universal.

== Legacy ==
In historical times, travelers in Cynos were shown Pyrrha’s grave. According to Strabo, in ancient times all of Thessaly was called Pyrrhaea in honor of Deucalion’s wife, and off the coast of Phthiotis there were two small islands named Pyrrha and Deucalion. More generally, Pyrrha was regarded as the eponym of many towns and regions which, in fact, apparently derived their names from the reddish color of the soil.

The myth of Pyrrha and Deucalion achieved a certain popularity in the modern era. It is the subject of plays by Heinrich Leopold Wagner and Hans Rehfisch (both titled Deucalion), operas by Luigi Bernasconi, Pierre Montan Berton, and Giuseppe Sarti (all titled Deucalion and Pyrrha), a relief by Antonio Filarete on the doors of St. Peter’s Basilica in Rome, a fresco by Baldassare Peruzzi, and other works of art.

The asteroid (632) Pyrrha, discovered in 1907, was named in her honor.

== Genealogy of Hellenes ==
Genealogy

Iapetus	Clymene
Prometheus	Epimetheus	Pandora
Deucalion	PYRRHA
Hellen	Orseis
Dorus	Xuthus	Aeolus
Achaeus	Ion
Cretheus	Sisyphus	Athamas	Salmoneus	Deion	Magnes	Perieres
Canace	Alcyone	Pisidice	Calyce	Perimede

== See also ==
- Noah's Ark
