= Deucalion =

Greek mythological figure

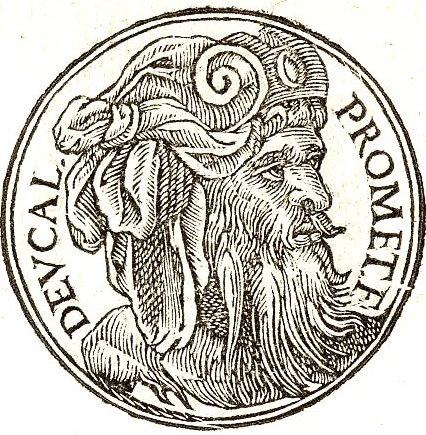
Deucalion from Promptuarium Iconum Insigniorum

In Greek mythology, Deucalion (Ancient Greek: Δευκαλίων; pronounced /djuːˈkeɪliən/ or /djuːˈkæl-/, dyoo-KAY-lee-ən or dyoo-KAL-ee-on) was the son of Prometheus; ancient sources name his mother as Clymene, Hesione, or Pronoia. He is closely connected with a flood myth in Greek mythology.

The trans-Neptunian object (53311) Deucalion, discovered in 1999, was named in his honor.

== Etymology ==
According to folk etymology, Deucalion's name comes from δεῦκος, deukos, a variant of γλεῦκος, gleucos, i.e. "sweet new wine, must, sweetness" and from ἁλιεύς, haliéus, i.e. "sailor, seaman, fisher". His wife Pyrrha's name derives from the adjective πυρρός, -ά, -όν, pyrrhós, -á, -ón, i.e. "flame-colored, orange".

== Family ==
Of Deucalion's birth, the Argonautica (from the 3rd century BC) stated:

There [in Achaea, i.e. Greece] is a land encircled by lofty mountains, rich in sheep and in pasture, where Prometheus, son of Iapetus, begat goodly Deucalion, who first founded cities and reared temples to the immortal gods, and first ruled over men. This land the neighbours who dwell around call Haemonia [i.e. Thessaly].

According to Bibliotheca, Deucalion and Pyrrha had at least two children, Hellen and Protogenea, and possibly a third, Amphictyon. Another account, adds a daughter Melanthea to the list of the couple's progeny. This daughter, also called Melantho, became the mother of Delphus by Poseidon.

Deucalion's and Pyrrha's children are apparently named in one of the oldest texts, Catalogue of Women, and include daughters Pandora and Thyia, and at least one son named Hellen. Their descendants were said to have dwelt and ruled in Thessaly.

One source mentioned three sons of Deucalion and his wife: Orestheus, Marathonios and Pronous (father of Hellen). Lastly, Deucalion sired a son, no mention of the mother, Candybus who gave his name to the town of Candyba in Lycia.

Genealogy

Iapetus	Clymene
Prometheus	Epimetheus	Pandora
DEUCALION	Pyrrha
Hellen	Orseis
Dorus	Xuthus	Aeolus
Achaeus	Ion
Cretheus	Sisyphus	Athamas	Salmoneus	Deion	Magnes	Perieres
Canace	Alcyone	Pisidice	Calyce	Perimede

Comparative table of Deucalion's family
Relation	Names	Sources																	
Relation	Names	Homer	Hesiod	Hellan.	Acus.	Apollon.		Diod.	Diony.	Ovid	Strabo	Apollod.	Harp.	Hyg.	Paus.	Lact.	Steph.	Suda	Tzet.
Relation	Names	Sch. Ody.	Cat.	Hellan.	Acus.	Arg.	Sch.	Diod.	Diony.	Met.	Strabo	Apollod.	Lex.	Fab.	Paus.	Div. Ins.	Steph.	Suda	Lyco.
Parentage	Prometheus and Clymene	✓							✓										
Parentage	Prometheus and Hesione	✓			✓														
Parentage	Prometheus and Pronoia		✓				✓												
Parentage	Prometheus					✓				✓		✓							
Spouse	Pyrrha		✓				✓			✓	✓	✓		✓					
Children	Hellen		✓				✓	✓			✓	✓							
Children	Pandora		✓																
Children	Thyia		✓																
Children	Orestheus			✓											✓				
Children	Marathonius			✓															
Children	Pronous			✓															
Children	Amphictyon											✓	✓		✓	✓		✓	
Children	Protogeneia											✓		✓	✓				
Children	Candybus																✓		
Children	Melantho																		✓

== Mythology ==
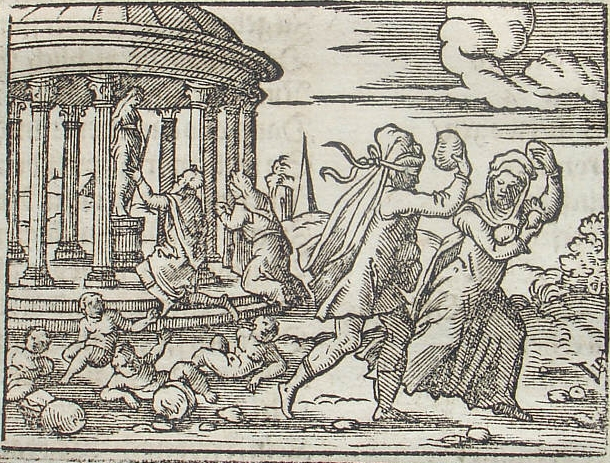
Deucalion and Pyrrha from a 1562 version of Ovid's Metamorphoses

=== Deluge accounts ===
The flood in the time of Deucalion was caused by the anger of Zeus, ignited by Prometheus, when he brought fire to man. During this catastrophic flood, the rivers ran in torrents and the sea flooded the coastal plain, engulfing the foothills with spray, and washing everything clean.

Deucalion, with the aid of his father Prometheus, was saved from this deluge by building a chest. Like the biblical Noah and the Mesopotamian counterpart Utnapishtim, he used this device to survive the great flood with his wife, Pyrrha.

The most complete accounts are given by Ovid, in his Metamorphoses (late 1 BCE to early 1 CE), and by the mythographer Apollodorus (1st or 2nd century CE). Deucalion, who reigned over the region of Phthia, had been forewarned of the flood by his father Prometheus. Deucalion was to build a chest and provision it carefully (no animals are rescued in this version of the flood myth), so that when the waters receded after nine days, he and his wife Pyrrha, daughter of Epimetheus, were the one surviving pair of humans. Their chest touched solid ground on Mount Parnassus, or Mount Etna in Sicily, or Mount Athos in Chalkidiki, or Mount Othrys in Thessaly.

Hyginus mentioned the opinion of a Hegesianax that Deucalion is to be identified with Aquarius, "because during his reign such quantities of water poured from the sky that the great Flood resulted."

Once the deluge was over and the couple had given thanks to Zeus, Deucalion (said in several of the sources to have been aged 82 at the time) consulted an oracle of Themis about how to repopulate the earth. He was told to "cover your head and throw the bones of your mother behind your shoulder". Deucalion and Pyrrha understood that "mother" was Gaia, the mother of all living things, and the "bones" to be rocks. They threw the rocks behind their shoulders and the stones formed people. Pyrrha's became women; Deucalion's became men. These people were later called the Leleges who populated Locris. This can be related to Pindar's account that recounted "Pyrrha and Deucalion came down from Parnassus and made their first home, and without the marriage-bed they founded a unified race of stone offspring, and the stones gave the people their name."

The 2nd-century AD writer Lucian gave an account of the Greek Deucalion in De Dea Syria that seems to refer more to the Near Eastern flood legends: in his version, Deucalion (whom he also calls Sisythus) took his children, their wives, and pairs of animals with him on the ark, and later built a great temple in Manbij (northern Syria), on the site of the chasm that received all the waters; he further describes how pilgrims brought vessels of sea water to this place twice a year, from as far as Arabia and Mesopotamia, to commemorate this event.

=== Variant stories ===
On the other hand, Dionysius of Halicarnassus stated Deucalion's parents to be Prometheus and Clymene, daughter of Oceanus, and mentioned nothing about a flood but instead named him as commander of those from Parnassus who drove the "sixth generation" of Pelasgians from Thessaly.

One of the earliest Greek historians, Hecataeus of Miletus, was said to have written a book about Deucalion, but it no longer survived. The only extant fragment of his to mention Deucalion does not mention the flood either, but named him as the father of Orestheus, king of Aetolia. The much later geographer Pausanias, following on this tradition, named Deucalion as a king of Ozolian Locris and father of Orestheus.

Plutarch mentioned a legend that Deucalion and Pyrrha had settled in Dodona, Epirus; while Strabo asserted that they lived at Cynus, and that her grave was still to be found there, while his may be seen at Athens. This can be related to an account that after the deluge, Deucalion, founder and king of Lycoreia in Mt. Parnassus was said to have fled from his kingdom to Athens with his sons Hellen and Amphictyon during the reign of King Cranaus. Shortly thereafter, Deucalion died there and was said to have been buried near Athens. During his stay in there, he was credited with having built the ancient sanctuary of Olympian Zeus. Additionally, Strabo mentioned a pair of Aegean islands named after the couple.

== Interpretation ==
=== Mosaic accretions ===
The 19th-century classicist John Lemprière, in Bibliotheca Classica, argued that as the story had been re-told in later versions, it accumulated details from the stories of Noah: "Thus Apollodorus gives Deucalion a great chest as a means of safety; Plutarch speaks of the pigeons by which he sought to find out whether the waters had receded; and Lucian of the animals of every kind which he had taken with him. &c." However, the Epic of Gilgamesh contains each of the three elements identified by Lemprière: a means of safety (in the form of instructions to build a boat), sending forth birds to test whether the waters had receded, and stowing animals of every kind on the boat. These facts were unknown to Lemprière because the Assyrian cuneiform tablets containing the Gilgamesh Epic were not discovered until the 1850s, 20 years after Lemprière had published his "Bibliotheca Classica". The Gilgamesh epic is widely considered to be at least as old as Genesis, if not older. Given the prevalence of religious syncretism in the ancient Greek world, these three elements may already have been known to some Greek-speaking peoples in popular oral variations of the flood myth, long before they were recorded in writing. The most immediate source of these three particular elements in the later Greek versions is unclear.

=== Dating by early scholars ===
For some time during the Middle Ages, many European Christian scholars continued to accept Greek mythical history at face value, thus asserting that Deucalion's flood was a regional flood, that occurred a few centuries later than the global one survived by Noah's family. On the basis of the archaeological stele known as the Parian Chronicle, Deucalion's Flood was usually fixed as occurring some time around 1528 BC. Deucalion's flood may be dated in the chronology of Saint Jerome to c. 1460 BC. According to Augustine of Hippo (City of God XVIII,8,10,&11), Deucalion and his father Prometheus were contemporaries of Moses. According to Clement of Alexandria in his Stromata, "in the time of Crotopus occurred the burning of Phaethon, and the deluges of Deucalion."

== Sources ==
- Hesiod, Catalogue of Women fragments 2–7 and 234 (7th or 6th century BC)
- Hecataeus of Miletus, frag. 341 (500 BC)
- Pindar, Olympian Odes 9 (466 BC)
- Plato, "Timaeus" 22B, "Critias" 112A (4th century BC)
- Apollonius of Rhodes, Argonautica 3.1086 (3rd century BC)
- Virgil, Georgics 1.62 (29 BC)
- Gaius Julius Hyginus, Fabulae 153; Poeticon astronomicon 2.29 (c. 20 BC)
- Dionysius of Halicarnassus, Roman Antiquities 1.17.3 (c. 15 BC)
- Ovid, Metamorphoses, 1.318ff.; 7.356 (c. 8 AD)
- Strabo, Geographica, 9.4 (c. 23 AD)
- Bibliotheca 1.7.2 (c. 1st century AD?)
- Plutarch, Life of Pyrrhus, 1 (75 AD)
- Lucian, De Dea Syria 12, 13, 28, 33 (2nd century AD)
- Pausanias, Description of Greece 10.38.1 (2nd century AD)
- Nonnus, Dionysiaca 3.211; 6.367 (c. 500 AD)
