= Makedon (mythology) =

Mythical forefather of the ancient Macedonians

In Greek mythology, Makedon (Ancient Greek: Μακεδών), also spelled Makednos (Μακεδνός) or transcribed Macedon, was the eponymous ancestor of the Makedones according to various ancient Greek fragmentary narratives. In most versions, he appears as a native or immigrant leader from Epirus, who gave his name to Macedonia, previously called Emathia according to Strabo, which according to Marsyas of Pella was until then a part of ancient Thrace.

== Etymology ==
Audio file for the pronunciation of Makednós in Modern Greek

Μακεδών (Makedón) is related to the Greek μᾰκεδνός (makednós, “tall, slim”). Both adjectives traditionally derive from the Indo-European root *mak- or *meh₂k-, meaning "long, slender", cognate with poetic Greek makednós or mēkedanós "long, tall", Doric mãkos and Attic mẽkos "length", Makistos, the mythological eponym of a town in Elis and an epithet of Heracles, Avestan masah "length", Hittite mak-l-ant "thin", Latin macer "meagre" and Proto-Germanic *magraz "lean, meager". The same root and meaning has been duly assigned to the tribal name of the Macedonians, which is commonly explained as having originally meant "the tall ones" or "highlanders" in Greek.

== Genealogy ==
=== Son of Thyia and Zeus ===
Deucalion	Pyrrha
~ Zeus (Note: Although Zeus copulated with all of Pyrrha's daughters, he was presumably only the father of Hellen; cf. West (1985, p. 56).)	(stones)
Hellen (hellenes)	Thyia ~ Zeus	Pandora ~ Zeus	Protogeneia ~ Zeus	leleges
Dorus (dorians)	Xuthus	Aeolus (aeolians)	Magnes (magnetes)	Makedon (Makedones)	Graecus (Graecians)	Aethlius
Achaeus (achaeans)	Ion (ionians)	Endymion
Aetolus (aetolians)

The genealogy of Makedon according to Hesiod's Catalogue of Women

A fragment of the Hesiodic Catalogue of Women, quoted by Constantine Porphyrogenitus, states: "Macedonia the country was named after Makedon, the son of Zeus and Thyia, daughter of Deucalion, as the poet Hesiod relates; and she became pregnant and bore to thunder-loving Zeus, two sons, Magnes and Macedon, the horse lover, those who dwelt in mansions around Pieria and Olympus". The poetic epithet "hippiocharmes" can alternatively be translated as "fighting on horseback" or "chariot-fighter" and has also been attributed to Aeolus son of Hellen, Troilus and Amythaon. A fragment of the Macedonian historian Marsyas of Pella (4th century BC), through a scholiast of Iliad xiv 226 confirms the genealogy as found in the Catalogue of Women: "Makedon son of Zeus and Thyia, conquered the land then belonging to Thrace and he called it Macedonia after his name. He married a local woman and got two sons, Pierus and Amathus; two cities, Pieria and Amathia in Macedonia were founded or named after them". The rare name of his mother Thyia, has been corrupted in transmission to Aithria or Aithyia through the phrase kai Thyia 'and Thyia'. Thyia in the Delphic tradition was an eponym naiad of the Thyiades, alternative name of the Maenads in the cult of Dionysus, certainly practiced also in Macedonia. Despite the name Catalogue of Women, the ancient genealogies were patrilineal. The primary building blocks were men, and women were the mortar.

The mythological chronologization of the Hesiodean passage indicates a time before the Trojan War and Iliad, since then the Magnetes dwell in Magnesia, Thessaly. The Catalogue of Women, which is variously dated mostly between the 8th and 6th century BC, provides the earliest and only reference to a Macedonian element before the 5th-century BC historiography. Makedon's mother Thyia, was the sister of Hellen, the progenitor of the Greeks; Makedon was therefore a nephew of Hellen. Furthermore, Magnes, the brother of the eponymous Makedon, was the progenitor of the Magnetes, an Aeolian Greek tribe.

According to Robert Fowler, the genealogy acknowledges the Macedonians' affinity to the Hellenes through their direct descent from Deukalion, whilst depicting that link as oblique, due to their indirect connection to Hellen; he compares the Macedonians to the Graikoi, who likewise descended not from Hellen, but a sister of his, and the Locrians, who descended from the Leleges, sprung directly from the stones thrown by Deukalion and Pyrrha. Martin Litchfield West interprets the passage as a statement that the Macedonians are not Hellenic, though he specifies that the Hellenes symbolised by the figure of Hellen are a Phthian tribe rather than the Greeks as a whole; he writes that this genealogy is focused "on a constellation of north Greek tribal groups", and that the tribes whose eponyms are not descended from Hellen are "not non-Greek, or at any rate not necessarily non-Greek, but they lie outside the scope of heroic myth."

According to Karren Stoppie, Hesiod didn't count the Macedonians as Hellenes, and adds that the adoption of his genealogy by the Macedonian historian Marsyas of Pella indicates that the Macedonians didn't consider themselves Hellenes. Jonathan M. Hall compares Magnes and Macedon to other excluded tribes from direct lineage to Hellen, and later Olympic participants, such as Aetolians, Acarnanians, and Arcadians. J. M. Hall suggests that "although Deucalion's paternity of Thuia made the latter Hellen's sister, Macedon was not himself descended directly from Hellen, thus excluding the Macedonians from the Hellenic genealogy", and proposes that "the Thessalians assigned this patronymic to Macedon and Magnes because they wanted to assert their priority, in terms of religious and other rights, over Magnesian and other rivals in that region", which Patterson also finds convincing.

Christiane Sourvinou-Inwood suggests that because the Magnetes were considered Greek and because their eponym, Magnes, occupies a genealogically equivalent position to Makedon, the Macedonians are presented by the poem as Greek. (Note: Sourvinou-Inwood 2002, p. 178. Sourvinou-Inwood (see pp. 177–181) also points to Makedon's mother as evidence for her view, and she argues more broadly against the idea that only descendants of Hellen were considered Greek in antiquity.) N. G. L. Hammond and Johannes Engels suggest that Hesiod counted the Macedonians as Greeks, and more specifically Aeolians, since Magnetes, descending from Magnes, brother of Makedon, were another Aeolic tribe.

Eugene N. Borza cites Hall's argument that the Greeks had a dynamic view of their identity, and he cautions against using mythical genealogies as conclusive evidence of ethnic identity because myths of common ancestry are part of a continuing process of redefinition of their own identity.

=== Son of Aeolus ===
In a fragment of a chronological work of Hellanicus called "Priestesses of Hera at Argos", and preserved by Stephanus, Makedon is son of Aeolus, as Hellanicus relates in the first (book or archive list) of his "Hiereiai tes Heras en Argei", and of Makedon, the son of Aeolus, the present Macedonians were named so, then living alone with the Mysians. The fragment does not clarify who of the three Aeoli is Makedon's father but Eustathius reported him as one of the ten sons of Aeolus, thus the son of Hellen. In later traditions, Magnes is also reported as one of the ten sons of Aeolus and father of Pierus. N. G. L. Hammond, based on the passage of Hellanicus, as well on the Thessalian Magnes being brother of Macedon, suggested that Macedonian was an Aeolic Greek dialect. K. Stoppie suggested that Hellanicus probably stayed at the Macedonian court and that it is possible that this genealogy was part of Archelaus’ political propaganda.

=== Son of Osiris ===
In "The antiquities of Egypt", first chapter of Bibliotheca historica by Diodorus Siculus, which is based mainly on Aegyptiaca of Hecataeus of Abdera, Greek and Egyptian mythology have been syncretized. Osiris has taken the place of Dionysus in his various myths and expeditions. According to Herodotus Osiris was the Egyptian Dionysus and the house of Ptolemies claimed descent from Dionysus. (see also Osiris-Dionysus deity). Diodorus relates: "Now Osiris was accompanied on his campaign, as the Egyptian account goes, by his two sons Anubis and Macedon, who were distinguished for their valour. Both of them carried the most notable accoutrements of war, taken from certain animals whose character was not unlike the boldness of the men, Anubis wearing a dog's skin and Macedon the fore-parts of a wolf; and it is for this reason that these animals are held in honour among the Egyptians. Macedon his son, moreover, he left as king of Macedonia, which was named after him." Makedon has taken the place of the Egyptian wolf-god of Lycopolis, Wepwawet and in later traditions Makedon is mentioned as a son of the were-wolf Lycaon.

=== Son of Lycaon ===
According to Apollodorus, but not present in the list of Pausanias or Hyginus, Macednus is the tenth of the fifty sons of the impious Lycaon king of Arcadia. His mother may either be the naiad Cyllene, Nonacris or by unknown woman. The closest brother to him by region is Thesprotus. In the story of Pindus and the Serpent by Claudius Aelianus, Makedon is the son of Lycaon king of Emathia, "after whom the land was called Macedonia no longer preserving its ancient name".

Eustathius, summarizing the genealogies, relates: "Emathion son of Zeus and Electra preceding the birth of Makedon son of Aeacus" (instead of Lycaon). Strabo just called him archaios hegemon (old chieftain), and Pseudo-Scymnus, gêgenês basileus (earth-born king). Isidore of Seville, "rege Deucalionis materno nepote" (king, maternal grandson of Deucalion).

=== Descendants ===
According to Marsyas of Pella, Makedon had two sons by a local woman: Pierus and Amathus. In the Ethnika of Stephanus (perhaps through Theagenes), sons and grandsons of Makedon are: Atintan (in the version of Lycaon) eponymous of a region in Epirus or Illyria, Beres, (father of Mieza, Beroea and Olganos, toponyms in Bottiaea), Europus by Oreithyia, daughter of Cecrops, and Oropus, birthplace of Seleucus I Nikator , which is perhaps confused with Europus. Finally, in the version of Lycaon, king of Emathia, Pindus is a son of Makedon, who gave his name to Pindus, where he died, a river of Doris, a region in central Greece.

It is unclear whether these localities represent pre- or post-Macedonian elements, since Emathia and Pieria are older toponyms than Macedonia. Anachronism is not infrequent in later mythic traditions. (Cf. Boeotus, reported as father of autochthon Ogyges)

== Name ==
=== Classical form ===
In Greek sources, the noun is mostly attested as Μακεδών (Makedôn) with two exceptions: the poetic form Μακηδών (Makêdôn) in Hesiod with long medial vowel serving the metrical feet of dactylic hexameter and Mάκεδνος (Mákednos) or latinicized Macednus with barytonesis and apophony in Apollodorus. The recessive accent is reminiscent of two Macedonian barytonized personal names, Κοῖνος (Koînos) and Βάλακρος (Bálakros) (Attic/Greek adjectives:koinós, phalakrós), but whether Makedôn or Mákednos is the original spelling presumably cannot be proven. Moreover, the suffix -dnos, either as the "Dorian Makednón ethnos" of Herodotus or makednós, a rare poetic epithet denoting tall, seems not to be attested in epigraphy, or used by Macedonians themselves.

In Latin sources the noun is Macedo. As adjectives, the Latin Macedo and Greek Makedṓn (Μακεδών) denote foremost a 'Macedonian man', and in plural, Macedones and Makedónes respectively, the 'people of Macedon'. They also appear, mostly during the Roman era, as personal male names (cf. Macedonius).

== See also ==
- Ancient Greece
- Vergina Sun
- Kings of Macedon
