= Mieza =

Mieza may refer to:

- Mieza, Macedonia, an ancient town in Macedonia, where Aristotle taught the young Alexander the Great
- Mieza, Spain, a municipality in the province of Salamanca, Spain
- Mieza nervosa, a moth of the family Notodontidae
- Mieza, the daughter of Beres in Greek mythology
