= Cliovis =

Visualisation software for timelines

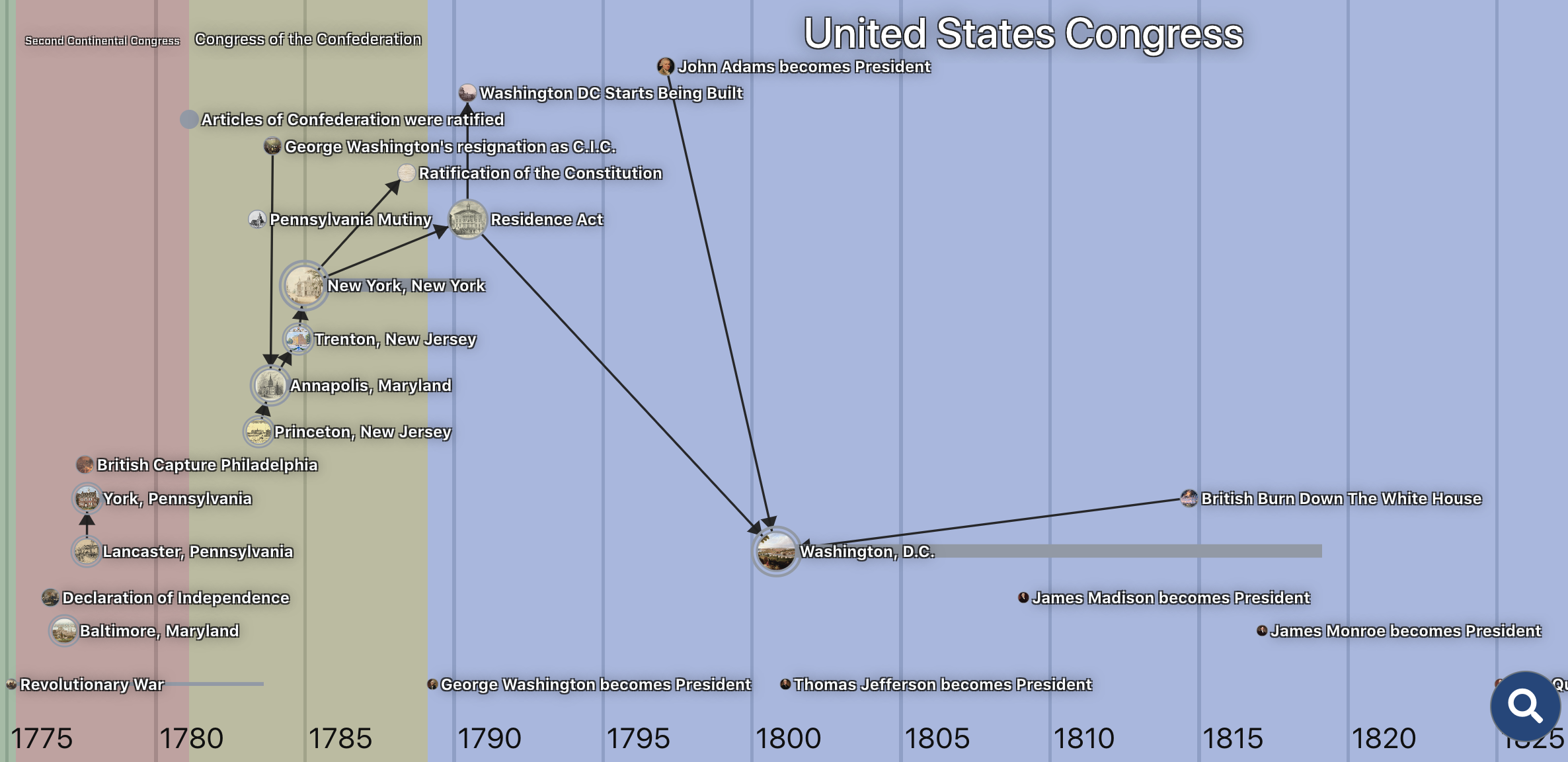
Cliovis timeline depicting the history of U.S. Capitol locations, 1775–1825.

ClioVis is a visualization tool enabling users to create interactive timelines and story-maps for teaching and research. Cliovis derives its name from Clio, the Greek muse of history, and Vis for visualization. According to UT Austin president Jay Hartzell, ClioVis is an example of new pedagogic approaches that are “immersive, collaborative and hands-on” in the 21st century. Cliovis was started in 2018 by Dr. Erika Bsumek and Dr. Matthew O’Hair. The software was originally developed in collaboration between Dr. Bsumek, the University of Texas at Austin's Simulation and Game Applications (SAGA) lab and with funding from the UT Provost's Teaching Fellowship as well as UT's the College of Liberal Arts. In 2020, Cliovis received an Editor's Choice designation from Digital Humanities Now. Cliovis has also been named a Critical Literacy Technology by The University of Texas System.
