= Coelius Sedulius =

5th-century Christian poet

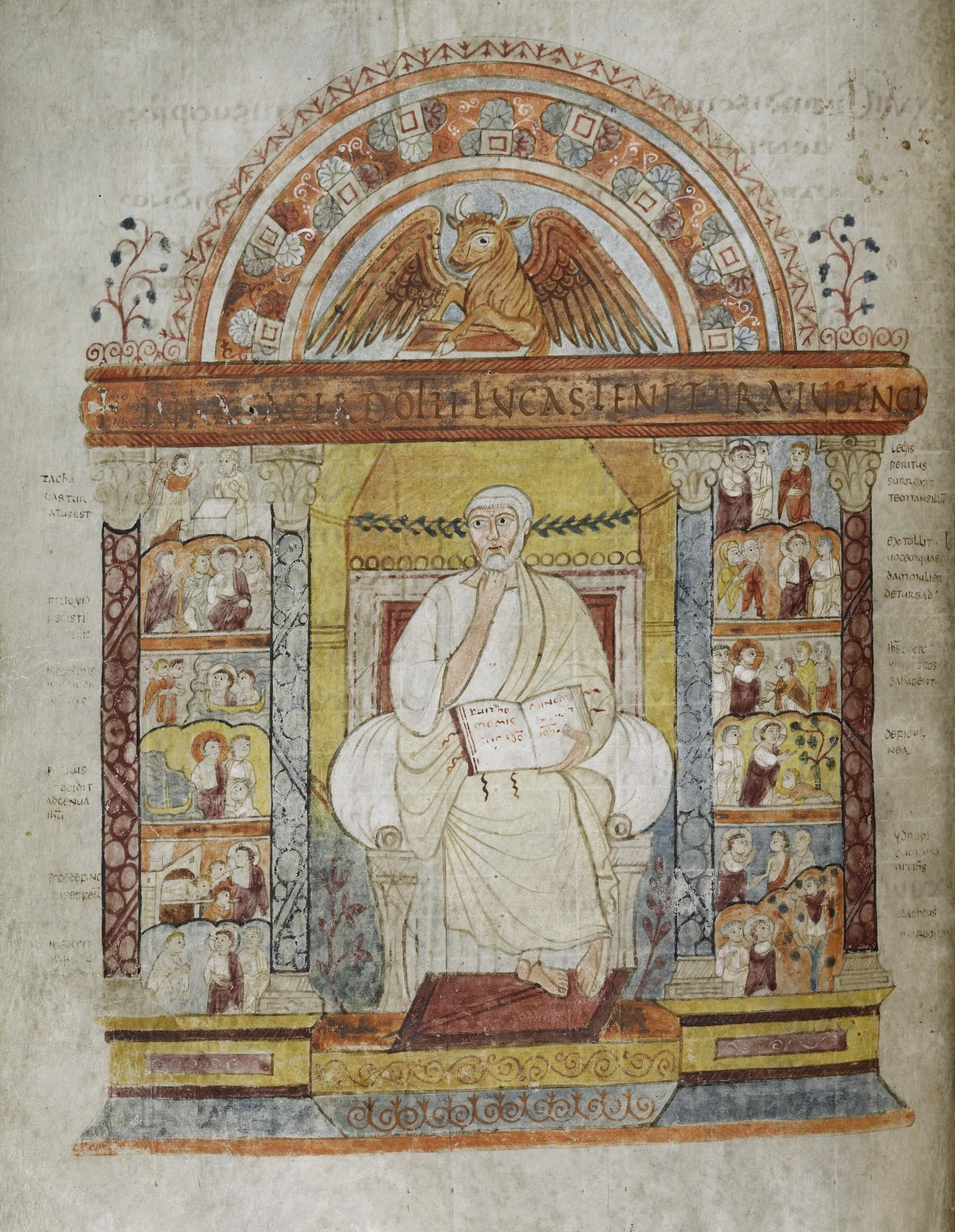
Illuminated miniature of St Luke beneath the inscription Iura sacerdotii Lucas tenet ore iuuenci from Sedulius' Carmen paschale. St Augustine Gospels, Parker Library MS 286, late 6th century

Sedulius (sometimes with the nomen Coelius or Caelius, both of doubtful authenticity) was a Christian poet during the first half of the 5th century.

== Biography ==
Little is known about his life. The only trustworthy information, contained in his two letters to Macedonius, recounts that he devoted his early life, perhaps as a teacher of rhetoric, to secular literature. Late in life he converted to Christianity, or, if a Christian before, began to take his faith more seriously. One medieval commentary states that he resided in Italy. Isidore of Seville (c. 560 – 636) and the Gelasian decree refer to him as a presbyter.

== Works ==
His fame rests mainly upon a long poem, Carmen paschale, based on the four gospels. In style a bombastic imitator of Virgil, he shows, nevertheless, a certain freedom in the handling of the Biblical story, and the poem soon became a quarry for the minor poets. His description of the Four Evangelists in Carmen Paschale became well-known; the English translation below is from Springer (2013, p. 21).

Hoc Matthaeus agens hominem generaliter implet;
Marcus ut alta fremit uox per deserta leonis;
Iura sacerdotii Lucas tenet ore iuuenci;
More uolans aquilae uerbo petit astra Iohannes.

Translation:

Matthew plays the role of the whole human race;
Mark roars like the loud voice of a lion through the wilderness;
Luke holds the office of the priesthood with the face of an ox;
Flying like an eagle, John reaches for the stars with his word.

His other writings include an Abecedarian hymn in honour of Christ, A solis ortus cardine, consisting of twenty-three quatrains of iambic dimeters. This poem has partly passed into the Roman Rite liturgy, the first seven quatrains forming the Christmas carol "A solis ortus cardine", which has been translated into vernacular languages by, among many others, Martin Luther and Allan MacDonald. The Epiphany hymn, "Hostis Herodes impie"and "Veteris et novi Testamenti collatio" in elegiac couplets have also come down.

== Editions ==
- Faustino Arévalo (Rome, 1794), reprinted in Jacques Paul Migne's Patrologia Latina vol. xix.
- Johann Huemer (Vienna, 1885).
- Victoria Panagl (Bearb.), Sedulius, Opera Omnia, Ex Recensione Iohannis Huemer (Corpus Scriptorum Ecclesiasticorum Latinorum, 10), Wien, 2007, XLVII, 532 S.
- Springer, Carl P. (2013), Sedulius, The Paschal Song and Hymns, Ancient Israel and Its Literature, vol. 35, SBL Press, ISBN 978-1589837447

== Sources ==
- This work in turn cites:
  - Johann Huemer, De Sedulii poetae vita et scriptis commentatio (Vienna, 1878)
  - Max Manitius, Geschichte der christlich-lateinischen Poesie (Stuttgart, 1891)
  - Teuffel-Schwabe, History of Roman Literature (Eng. trans.), 473
  - Herzog-Hauck, Realencyklopädie für protestantische Theologie, xviii. (Leipzig, 1906)
  - Smith and Wace, Dictionary of Christian Biography (1887)
