= Mieza (Macedonia) =

Ancient town in Macedonia, Greece

- Μίεζα (Ancient Greek)
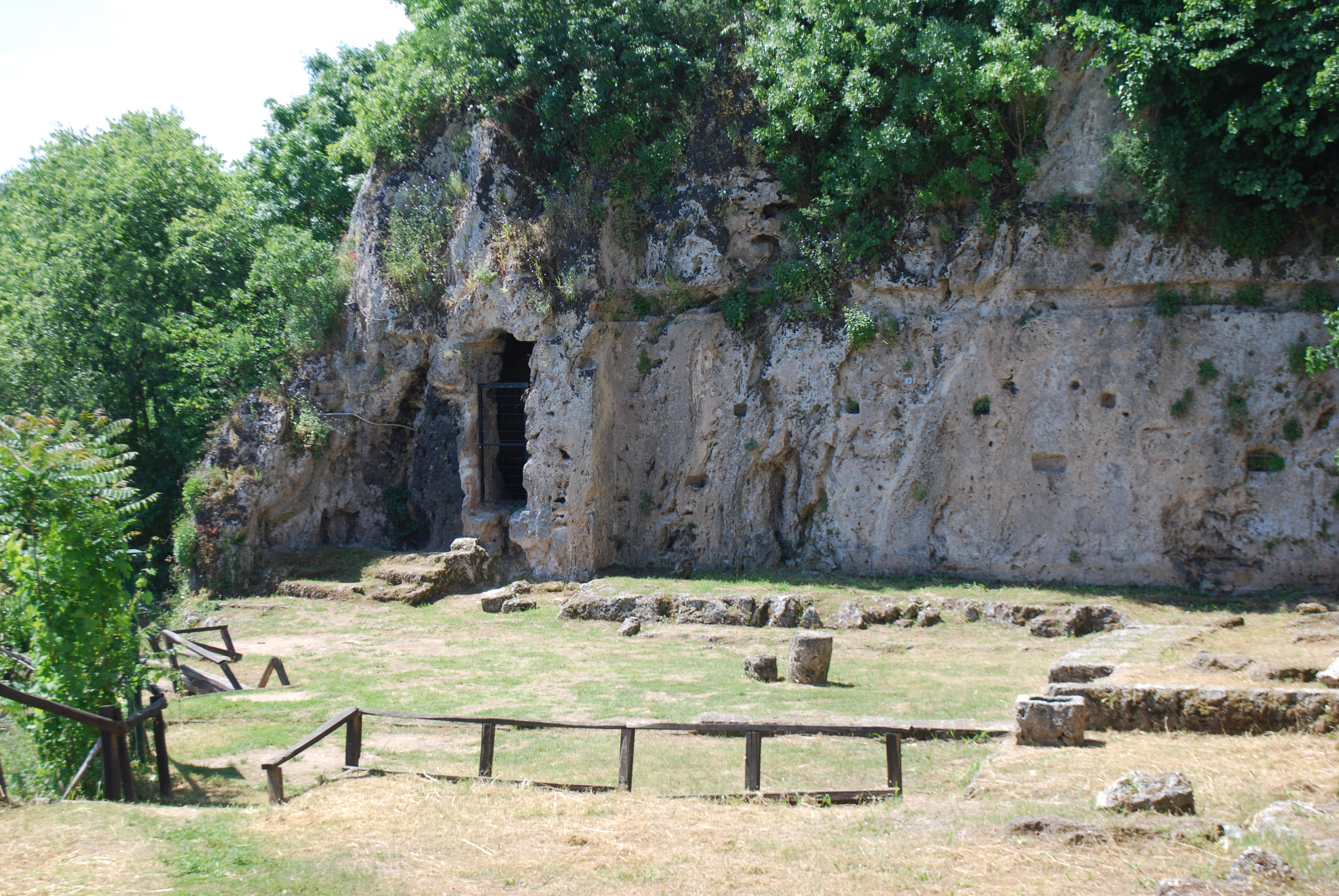
- Cave site at Mieza believed to be part of Aristotle's Macedonian school

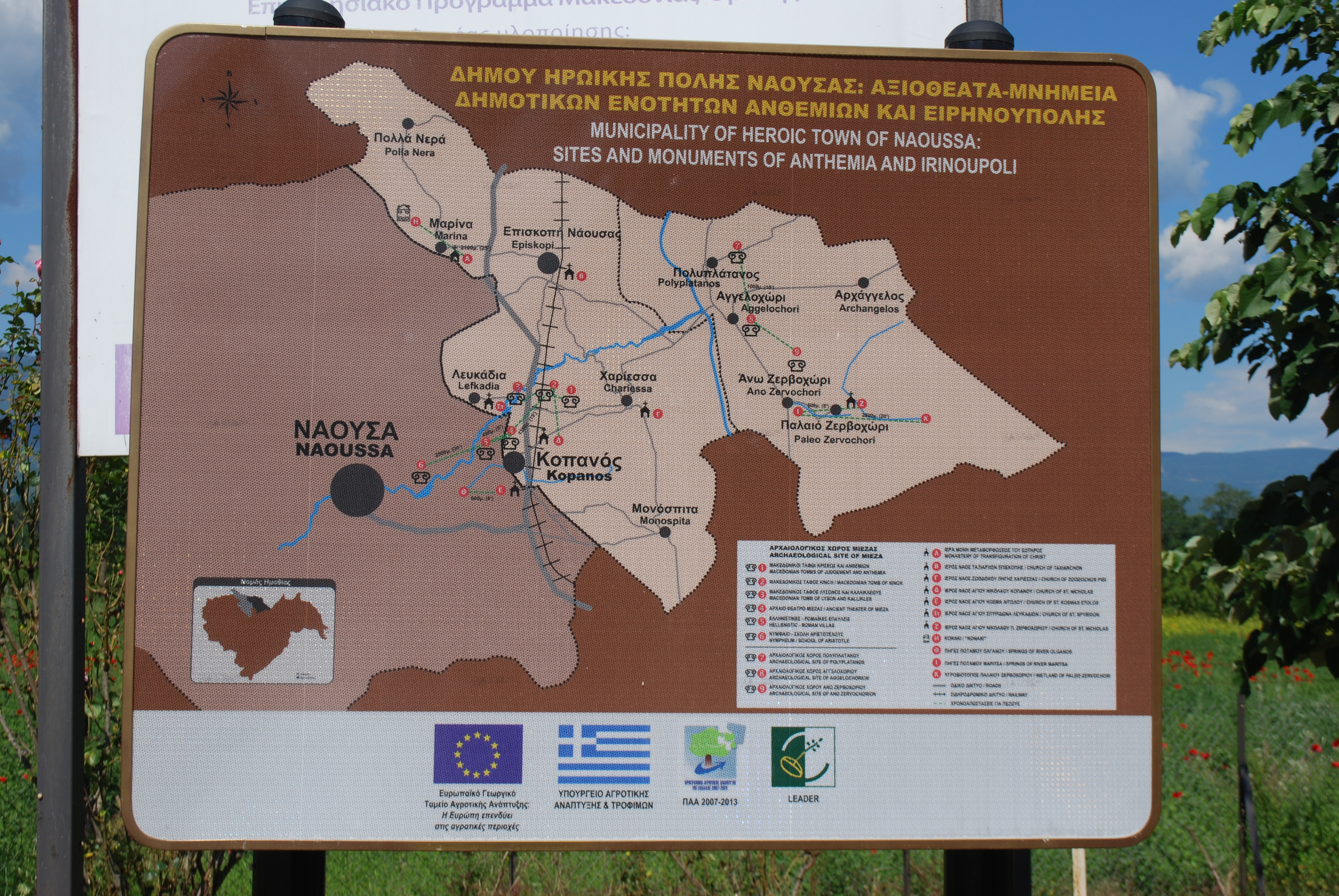
- Interactive map of Mieza
- 40°37′50″N 22°05′54″E

Mieza (Ancient Greek: Μίεζα) was a town in ancient Macedonia, where Aristotle was said to have taught the boy Alexander the Great between 343 and 340 BCE. Ptolemy classifies Mieza among the cities of Emathia. Stephanus of Byzantium, on the other hand, deriving his information apparently from Theagenes, alludes to it as "τόπος Στρυμόνος", and adds that it was sometimes called Strymonium. The site where Mieza once stood is the modern Lefkadia, near the modern town Náousa, Imathia, Central Macedonia, Greece, and has been the subject of archeological excavations since 1954.

Mieza was named for Mieza, in ancient Macedonian mythology, the daughter of Beres and sister of Olganos and Beroia. It was the home of Alexander's companion Peucestas. Aristotle was hired by Alexander's father, Philip II of Macedon, to teach his son, and was given the Temple of the Nymphs as a classroom. In return, Philip re-built and freed the citizens of Stagira, Aristotle's hometown, which he had razed in a previous conquest across Greece and Macedon.

Students educated at Mieza include Hephaestion, Ptolemy I Soter, Cassander, and Cleitus the Black.

== Archaeological sites ==
- The School of Aristotle in the Nymphaeum of Mieza (It is located in the "Isvoria" location of Naoussa). It is a landscape rich in water and vegetation where the Nymphaeum, the Sanctuary of the nymphs, is located. The first signs of use of the area go back to the Iron Age, but after the middle of the 4th century BC the site was transformed into a school and here the philosopher Aristotle taught the young Alexander philosophy, ethics, arts and mathematics. Between two natural caves the rock was carved vertically, an ionic colonnade was added and a C-shaped covered gallery was created. In the Archaeological Museum of Veria there are tiles and clay tiles from the roof of the gallery.
- The ancient theater of Mieza of Hellenistic period (2nd century BC). It was discovered by chance in 1992. It had a capacity of around 1,500-2,000 spectators. Excavations continue near the theater where the market of Mieza is located).
- The great Macedonian tomb "of Judgment" (Early 3rd century BC. Monumental two-chambered Macedonian tomb with a two-story facade and four paintings with scenes of the Judgment of the dead in Hades. Probably tomb of Peucestas, general of Alexander the Great, from Mieza).
- The Macedonian tomb of Lyson and Callicles (Around 200 BC. A small two-chambered Macedonian tomb with a simple facade and colorful paintings. It contains the bones and ashes of four generations of a high-ranking military family and was named after two of the dead) .
- The Macedonian tomb of the Anthemians (3rd century BC. Two-chamber vaulted Macedonian tomb).
- The Macedonian Tomb of Kinch (Around 310-290 BC. A small two-chambered Macedonian tomb with a simple facade. The painted decoration of the interior is no longer preserved. It was named after the Danish archaeologist Kinch who excavated it at the end of the 19th century).

== Gallery ==
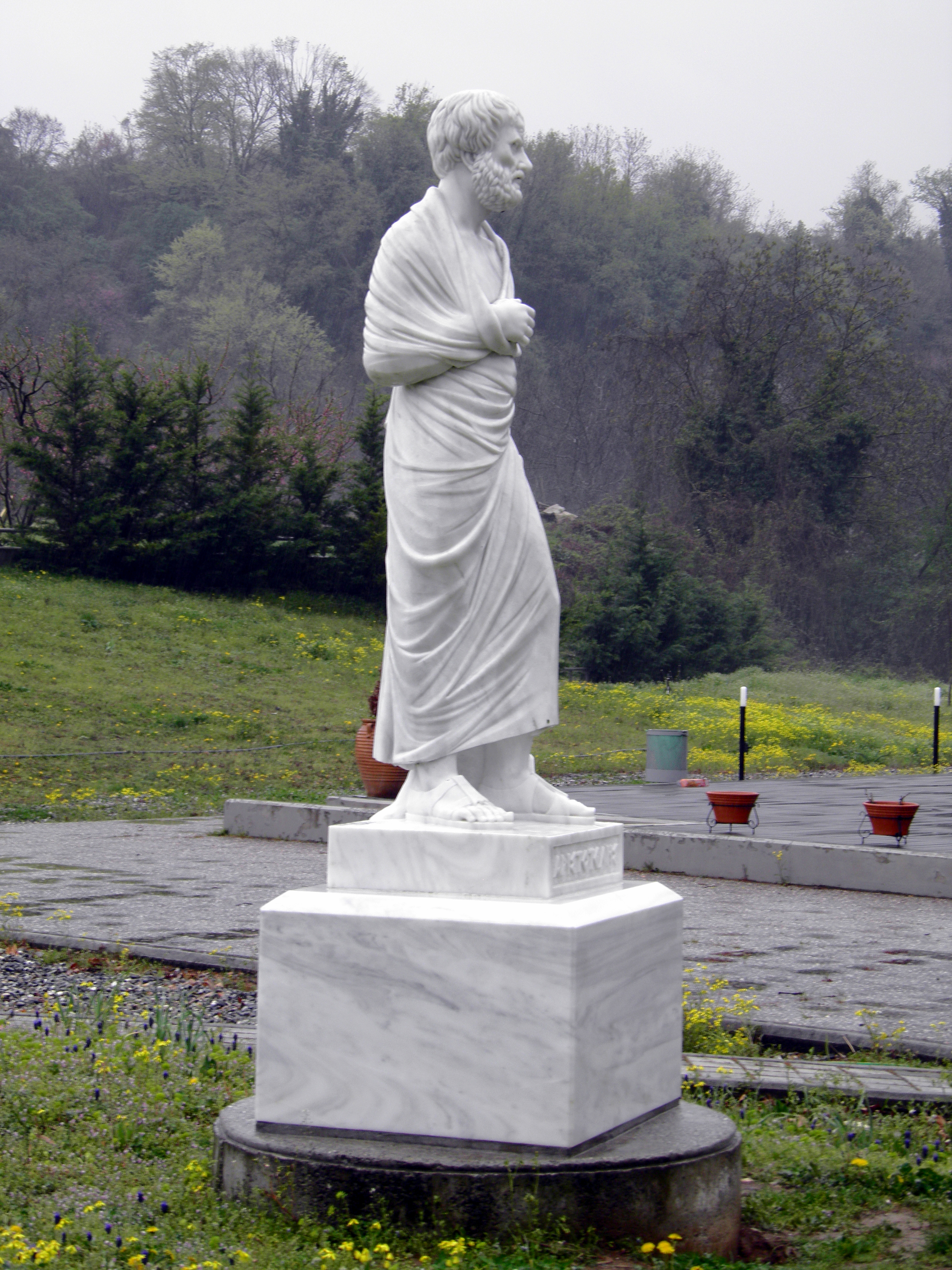
Modern statue of Aristotle near the School

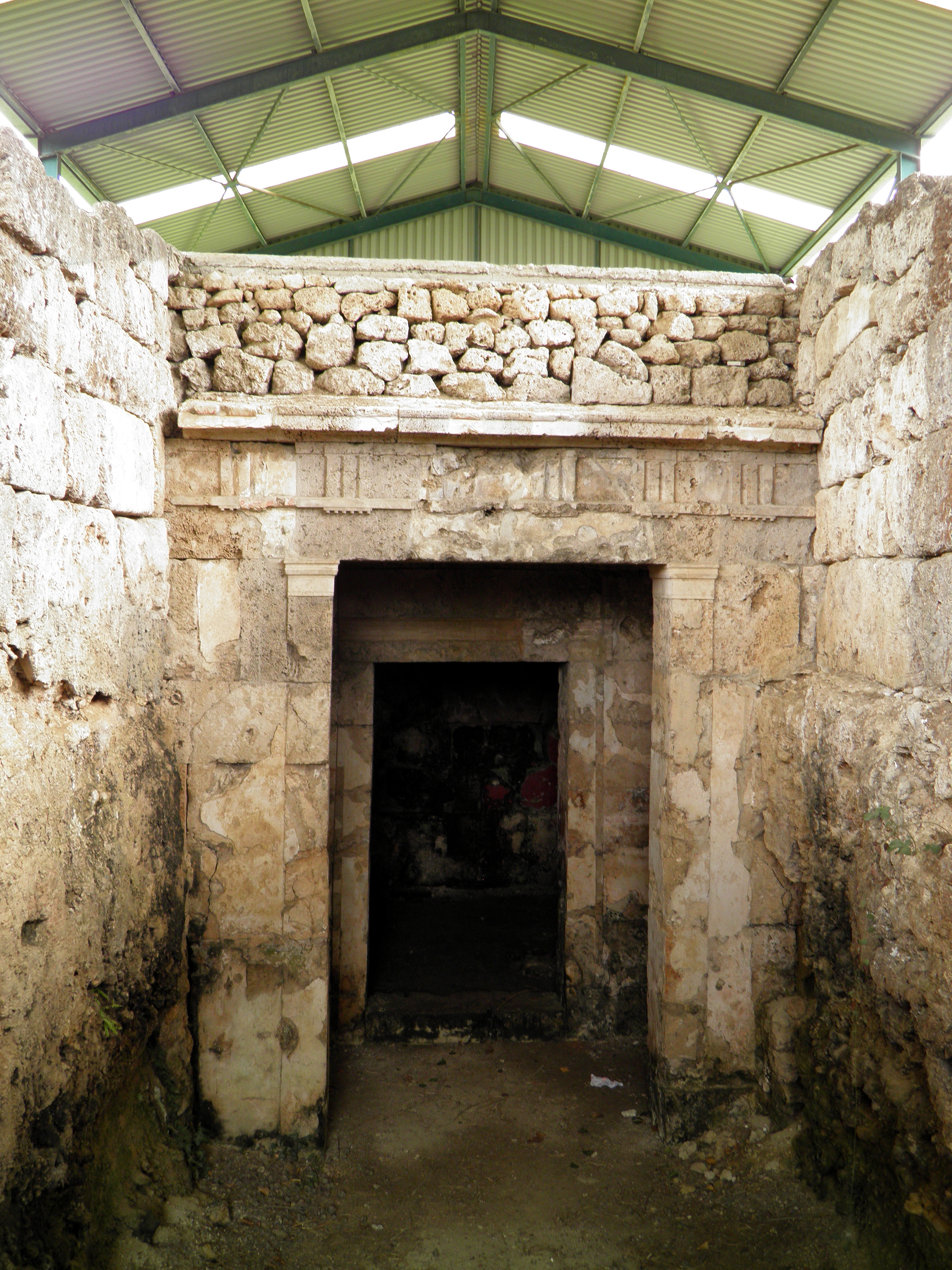
Kinch's Tomb

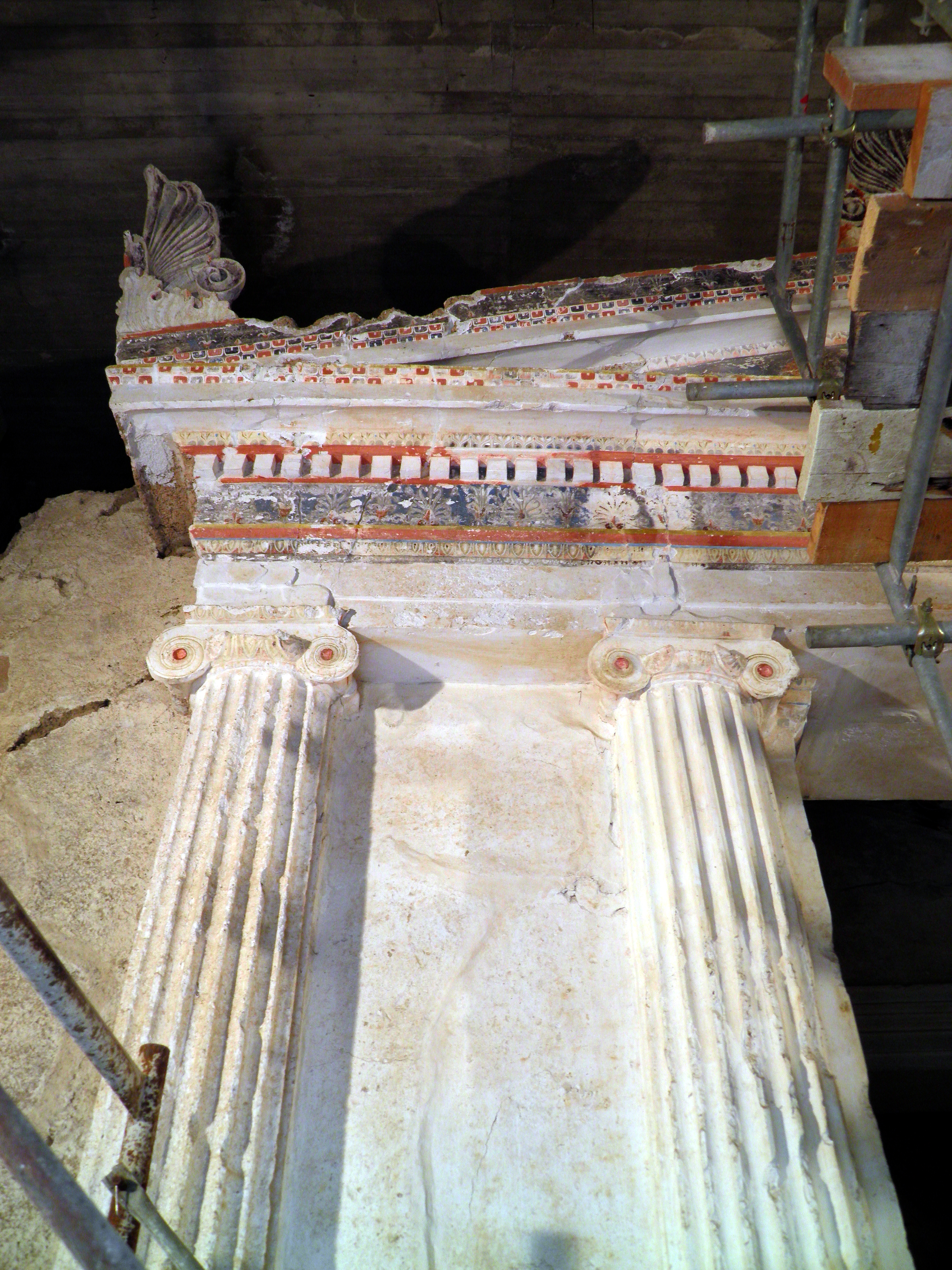
Facade of the "Tomb of the Palmettes" (3rd BC)

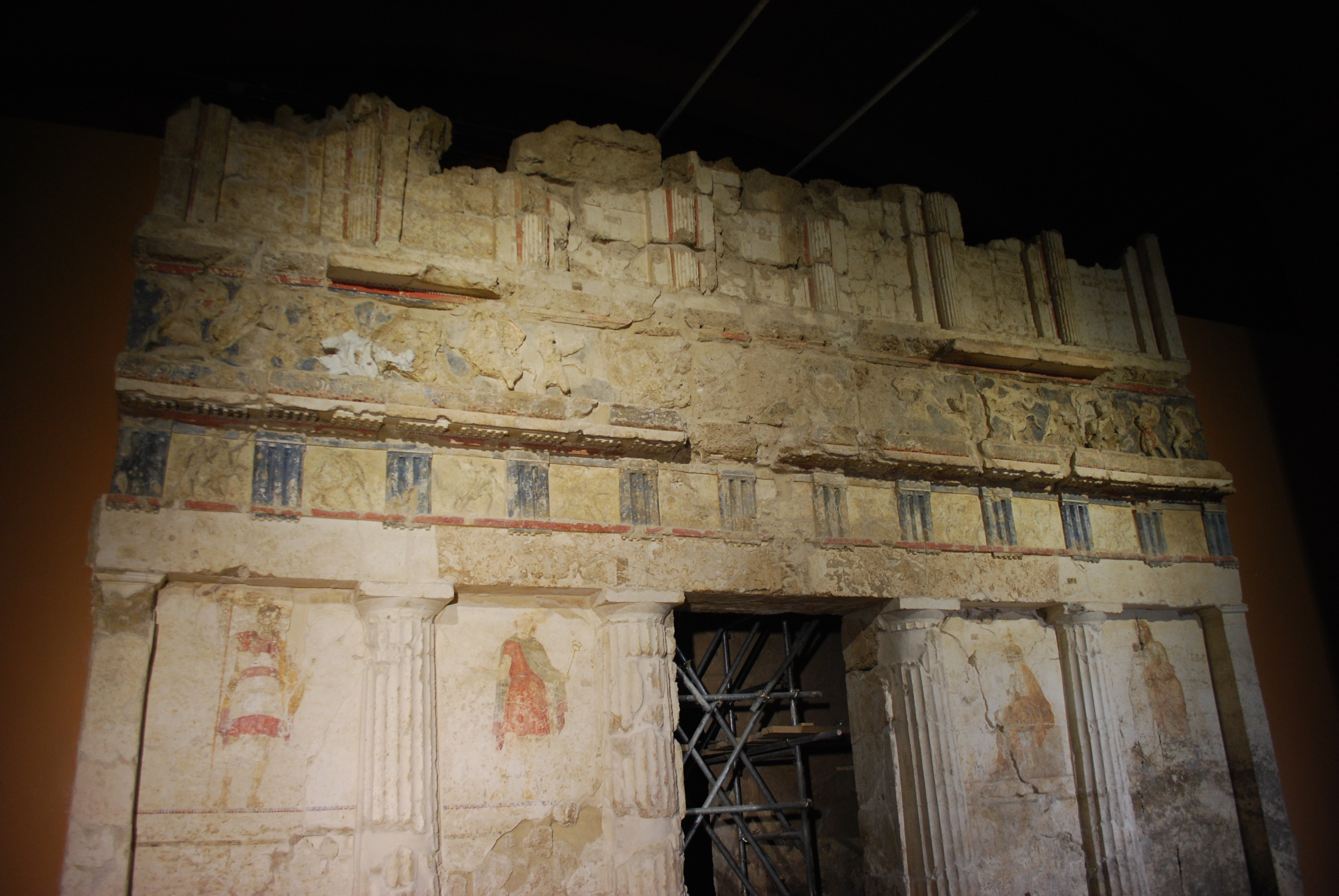
Facade of the "Tomb of Judgment" (4th/3rd C BC)

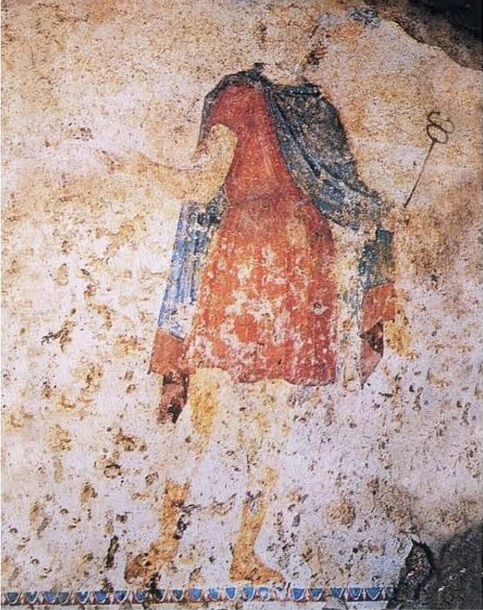
Fresco from the Tomb of Judgment showing religious imagery of the afterlife (Hermes Psychopompos)

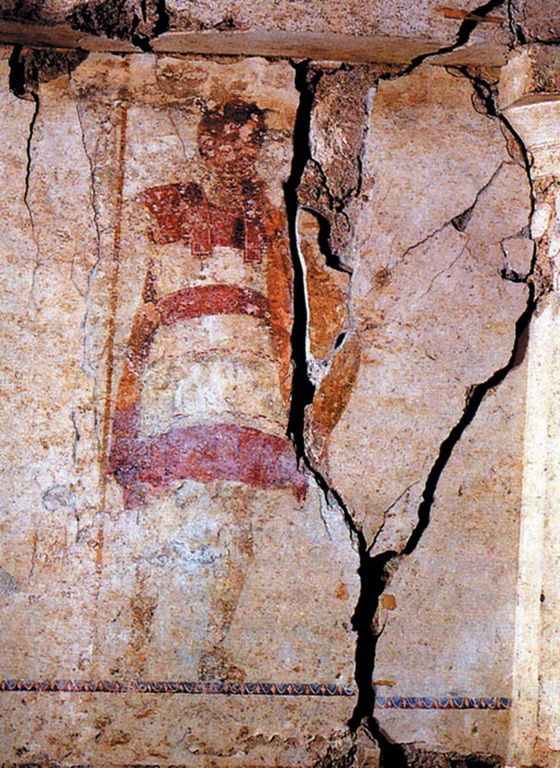
Another fresco from the Tomb of Judgment showing imagery of the afterlife

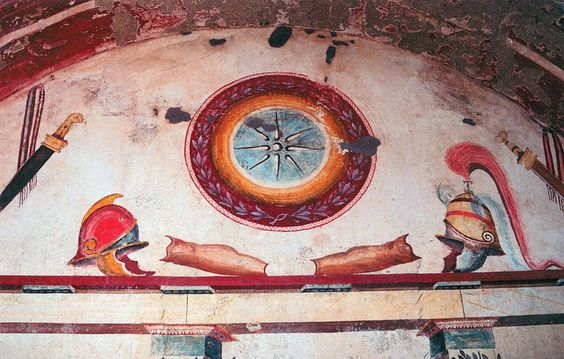
Painting from the Tomb of Lyson and Kallikles (3rd C BC)
