= Tomb of Judgement, Lefkadia =

Coordinates: 40.6542801°N 22.1345297°E

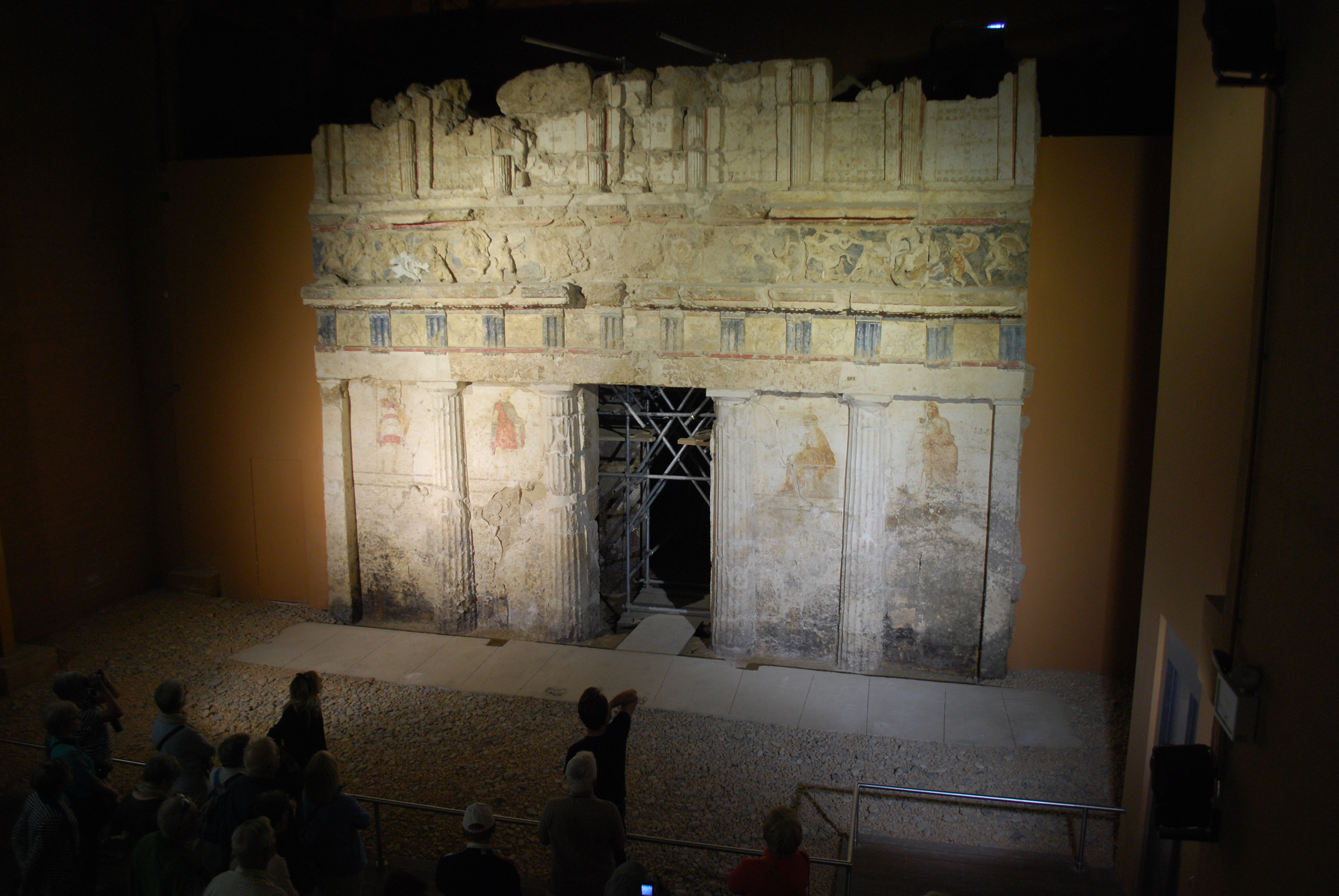
Facade of the Tomb of Judgement

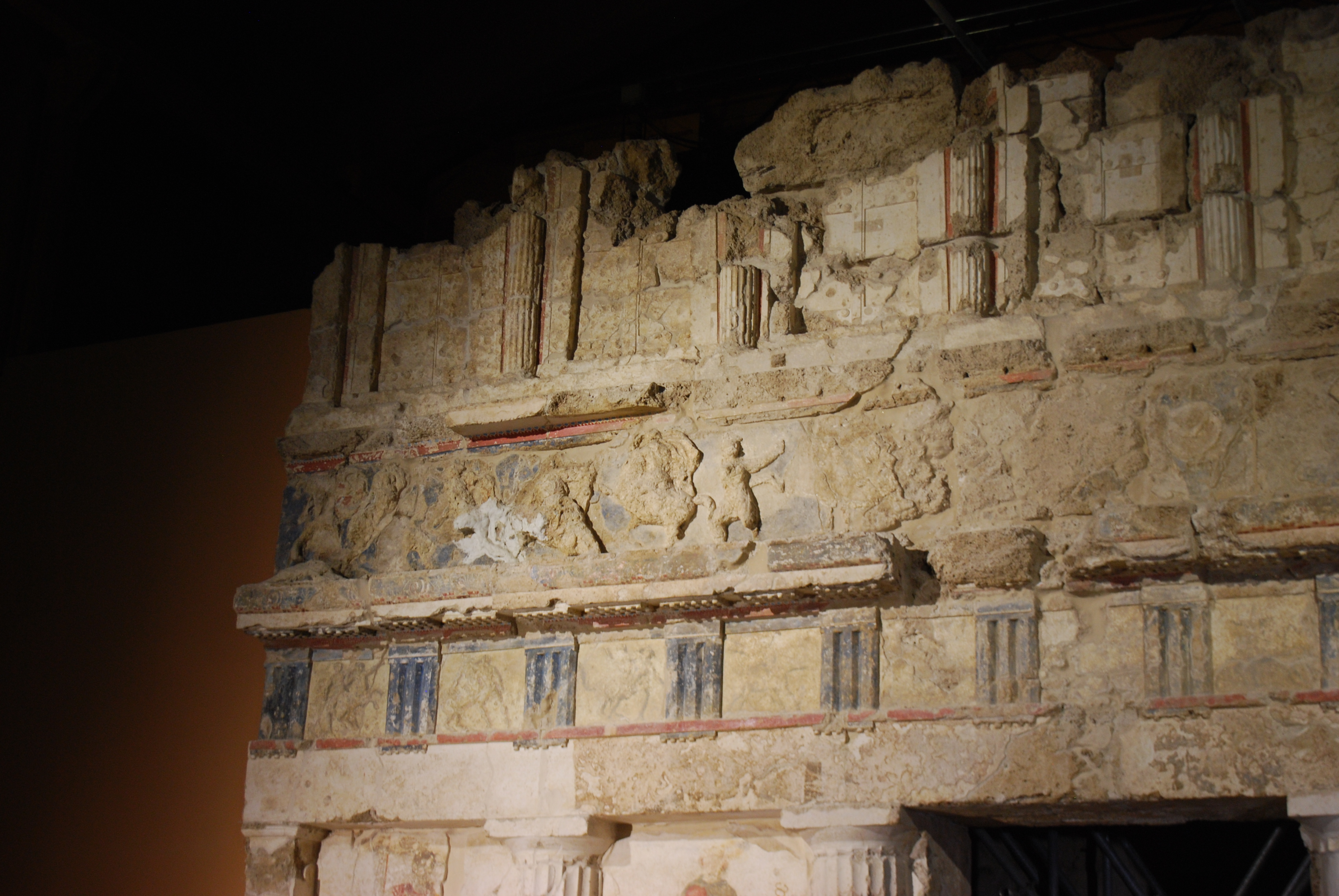
Upper section of the facade

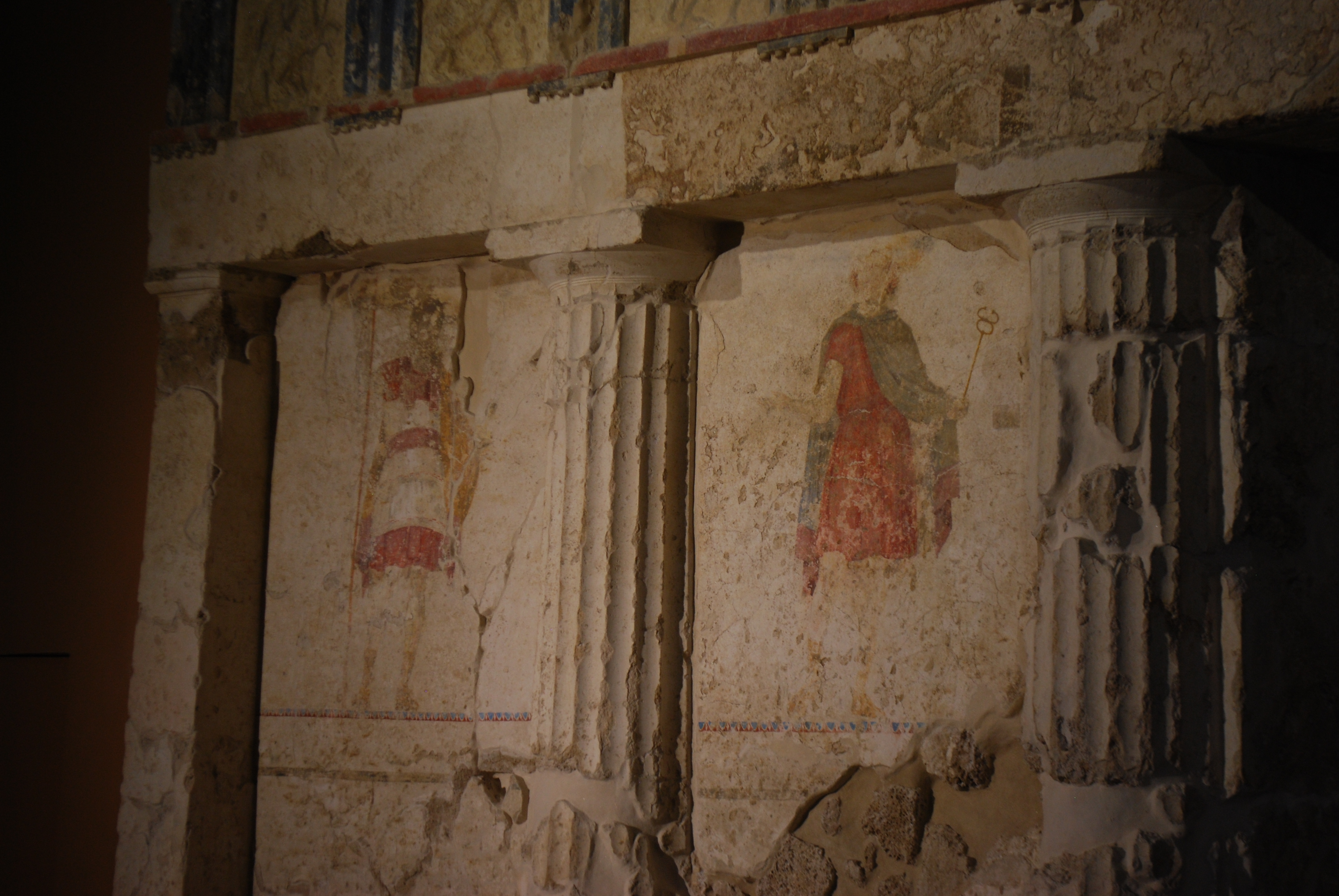
Warrior and Hermes, left section of the facade

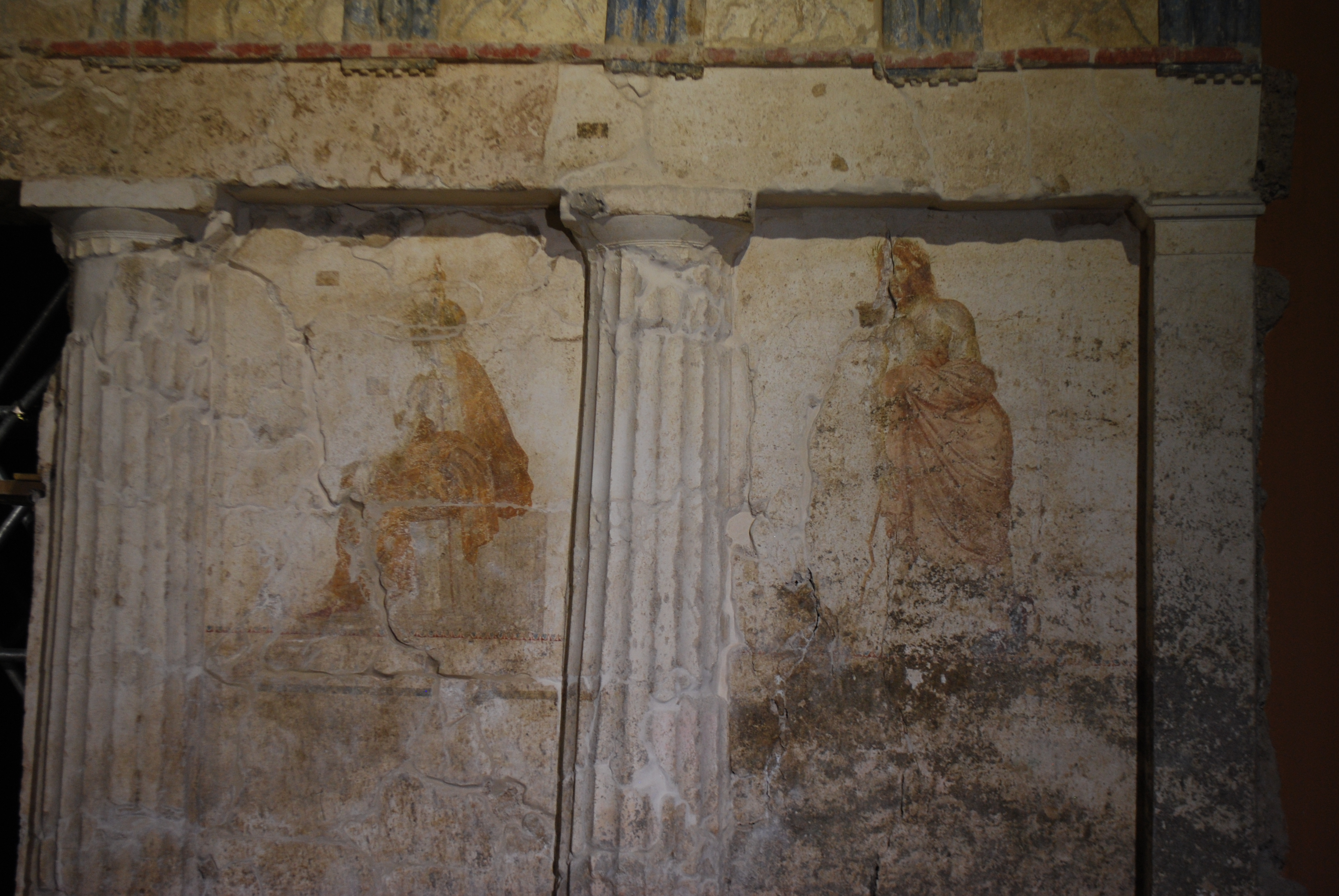
Aeacus and Rhadamanthys, right section of the facade

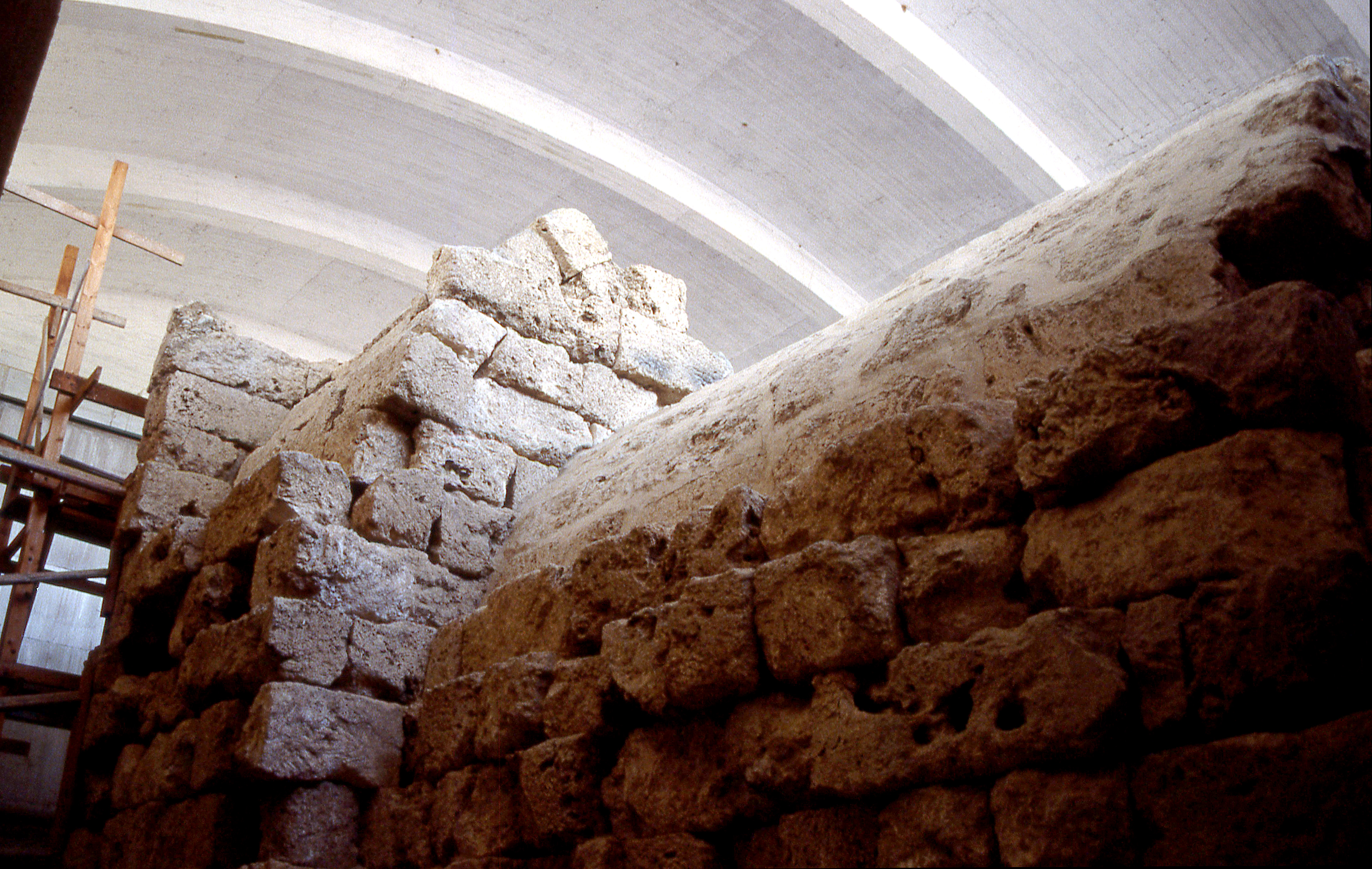
The rear of the facade and the exterior of the vaulted antechamber and burial chamber

The Tomb of Judgement (Greek: τάφος της Κρίσεως, romanized: tafos tis kriseōs), also known as the Great Tomb of Lefkadia, is an ancient Macedonian tomb of the Hellenistic period in Mieza (modern Lefkadia, near Naousa, Imathia), noted for its monumental painted facade. It was probably built at the beginning of the third century BC.

== Description ==
The tomb consists of two vaulted chambers: an antechamber and a burial chamber and a disproportionately large monumental facade. The structure was covered by an earthen tumulus, which was 1.5 m high and had a diameter of about 10 m; it was removed during excavation.

=== Facade ===
The facade is 8.68 m wide and 8.6 m high. It once had a triangular pediment with a tympanum containing relief decoration, but this is almost entirely lost as a result of severe damage suffered by the facade in antiquity. Below this, there is an upper story with six engaged Ionic columns in antis, which are 1.46 m high. In between these columns are seven 'false windows'. The upper part of most of these has also been lost. Below the columns, is a relief frieze depicting a battle of horsemen & infantry, who are probably Macedonians and Persians. The figures are made from lime mortar, their armour and clothes are painted, and the background is dark blue. Below this, there is a cornice with floral designs on a dark blue background and an entablature made up of dark blue triglyphs and metopes with a centauromachy. The lower half of the facade consists of four Doric columns in antis. The doorway to the antechamber is in the central intercolumniation.

The tomb is best-known for the four paintings in the lower half of the facade. These are located in the upper part of the spaces between the Doric columns. In the outer left space, there is a warrior, depicted frontally, looking slightly to the right. His left hand rests on the sheath of his sword, while his right hand holds a spear point down. He wears a short red chiton with a white cuirass over the top, a yellow chlamys over the right shoulder, and high yellow boots. In the inner left space there is Hermes Psychopompus, who lead the spirits of the dead down to the underworld. He is depicted frontally, moving to right, with his head turned to the left. His right arm is stretched out as if beckoning to the warrior and his left hand holds the caduceus, but he does not wear the petasus or winged sandals. He wears a dark red chiton, a pale blue chlamys with purple edges, and tall yellow boots.

In the spaces to the right of the door, are Aeacus and Rhadamanthys, two of the three judges of the dead, each identified by an inscription above them ([ΑΙΑ]ΚΟΣ and ΡΑΔΑΜ[Α]ΝΘΥΣ). Aeacus is shown on the inner right intercolumniation, in profile, seated on a cubic chair and looking to the left. His left hand is raised over his head and holds a long rod; his right hand is on his thigh. He wears a brown himation, which covers his entire body except for one shoulder and his upper chest. There is a ribbon and a wreath in his hair. His beard is rather wild. Rhadamanthys in the outer right intercolumiation is also depicted as an old man, with a wild beard and a wreath, but he is shown standing, in three-quarter view, resting on his staff. His himation is paler than Aeacus'. If the warrior is interpreted as a depiction of the tomb's occupant, then the series of images depicts the deceased being led down to judgement in Hades. This is the source of the tomb's usual name.

=== Interior ===
The interior of the structure is made up of two separate barrel-vaulted structures. The antechamber is unusually large: 6.5 m wide, 2.12 m long and 7.7 m high. This is because it is built to match the monumental scale of the facade. The chamber seems to have been unpainted, but it was severely damaged in antiquity and has not been fully excavated. The burial chamber is also barrel-vaulted, but is much smaller, measuring 4.8 m wide, 4.72 m long, and 5.26 m high. The walls are covered in stucco. A white podium with a cornice runs around the base of the wall, supporting white stucco pilasters in low relief, which themselves support an architrave, topped by a cornice. The wall between the pilasters is painted red, and the faux architectural members are decorated with painted rosettes. The design recalls wall painting in houses from the same period that have been excavated in Pella and Delos. The grave goods included a wooden couch with ivory elements, most notably a small sculpture of a woman, which was found in the antechamber.

== Excavation ==
The tomb was discovered during road construction in 1954 and excavated by Photis Petsas from 1954 to 1964. In 1998, it was re-excavated and restored by Liana Stefani. Finds from this excavation are stored in the Archaeological Museum of Veroia. The tomb is protected by a modern structure.

== Gallery ==
Tomb of Judgement
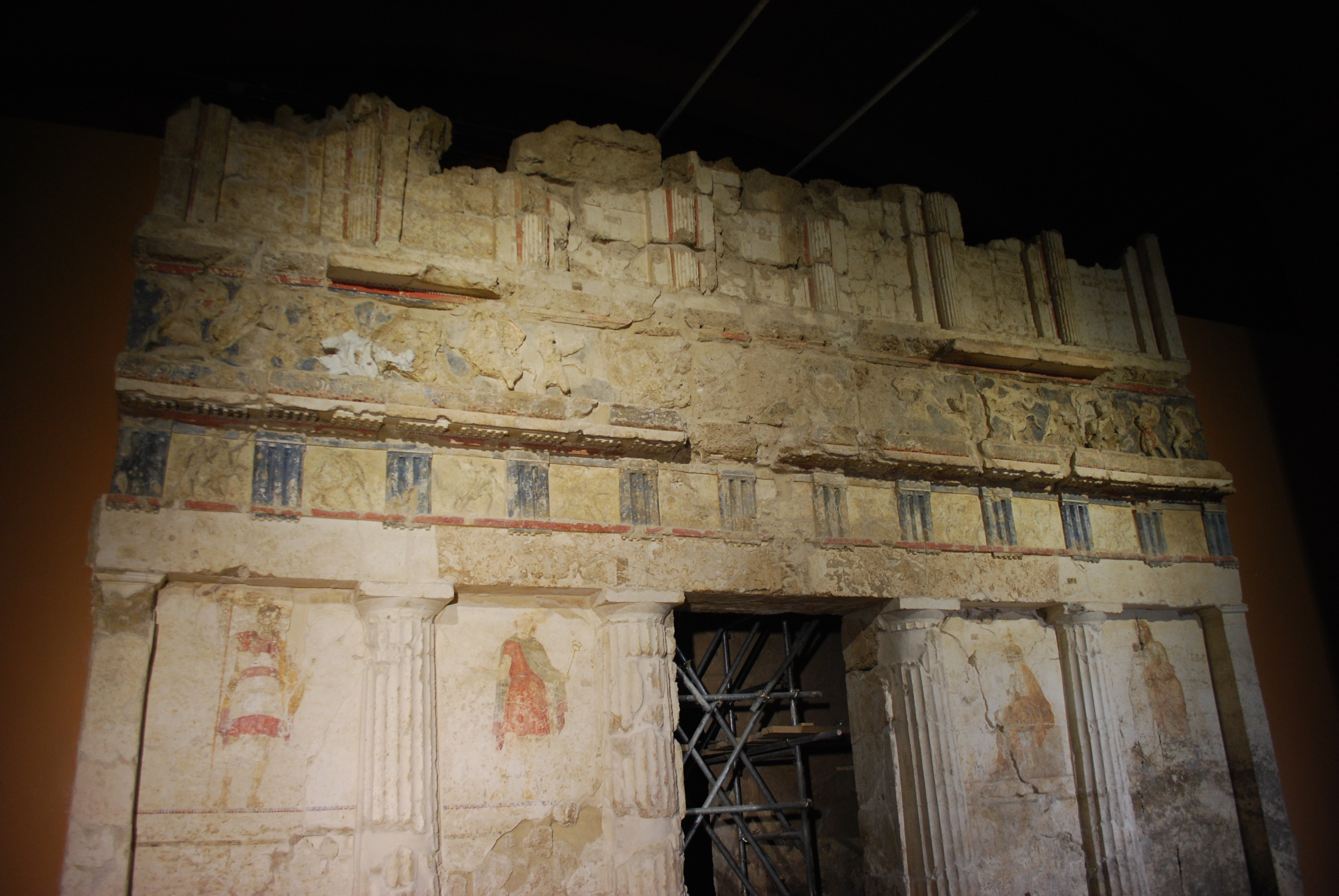
Lower section of the facade

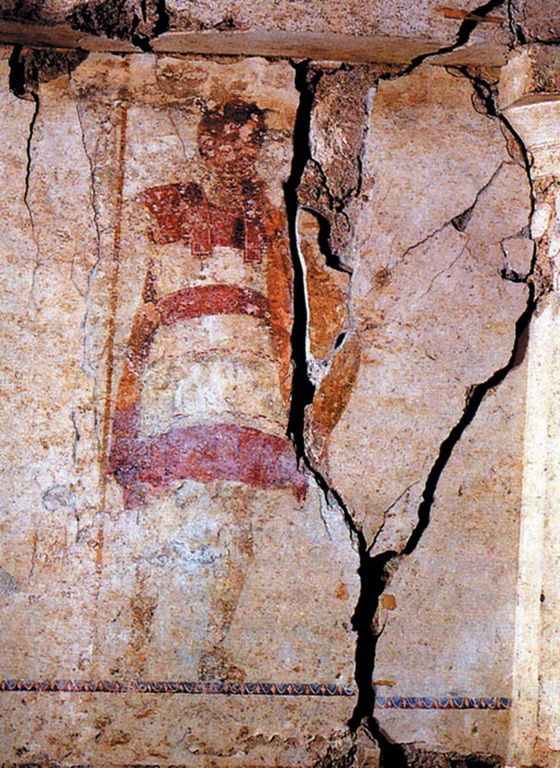
Standing warrior, outer left section of the facade

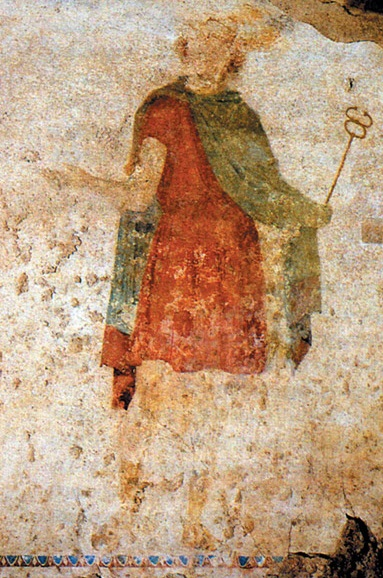
Hermes Psychopompus, inner left section of the facade

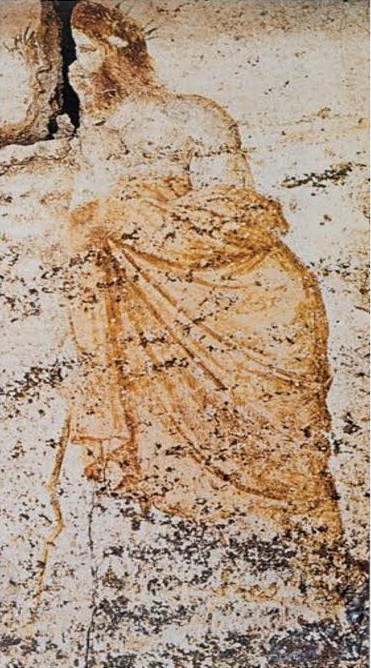
Rhadamanthys, outer right section of the facade

== Bibliography ==
- Ginouvès, René (1994). Macedonia: From Philip II to the Roman Conquest. Princeton, NJ: Princeton University Press. pp. 178–181. ISBN 0-691-03635-7.
- Πέτσας, Φώτιος Μ. (1966). Ο τάφος των Λευκαδίων. Athens: Αθήναις Αρχαιολογικής Εταιρείας.
- Στεφανή, Λ. (1998). "Η ανασκαφή στον προθάλαμο του Τάφου της Κρίσεως στα Λευκάδια". ΑΕΜΘ. 12: 413-420.
- Στεφανή, Ευαγγελία (2012). "Ελεφάντινα αντικείμενα από τον τάφο της Κρίσεως και οι συμβολικές χρήσεις του ελεφαντόδοντου από την ελίτ / Ivory artefacts of the tomb of Judgement and the symbolic uses of ivory by the "elite"". In Αδάμ-Βελένη, Πολυξένη; Τζαναβάρη, Κατερίνα (eds.). δινήεσσα τιµητικός τόµος για την Κατερίνα Ρωµιοπούλου. Thessaloniki: Αρχαιολγικο μουσειο Θεσσαλονίκη. pp. 509–522. ISBN 978-960-9621-09-0.
