= Altus (Mygdonia) =

Altus or Altos (/ˈæltəs, ˈɔːltəs/ A(W)L-təs; Ancient Greek: Άλτός) was a fortress town in Mygdonia near Therma (later Thessalonica). The town is mentioned by Stephanus of Byzantium and Theagenes of Macedon.

Its site is unlocated.
