= Tomb of the Palmettes =

Macedonian tomb at Lefkadia near Naousa

Coordinates: 40.6547782°N 22.1371431°E

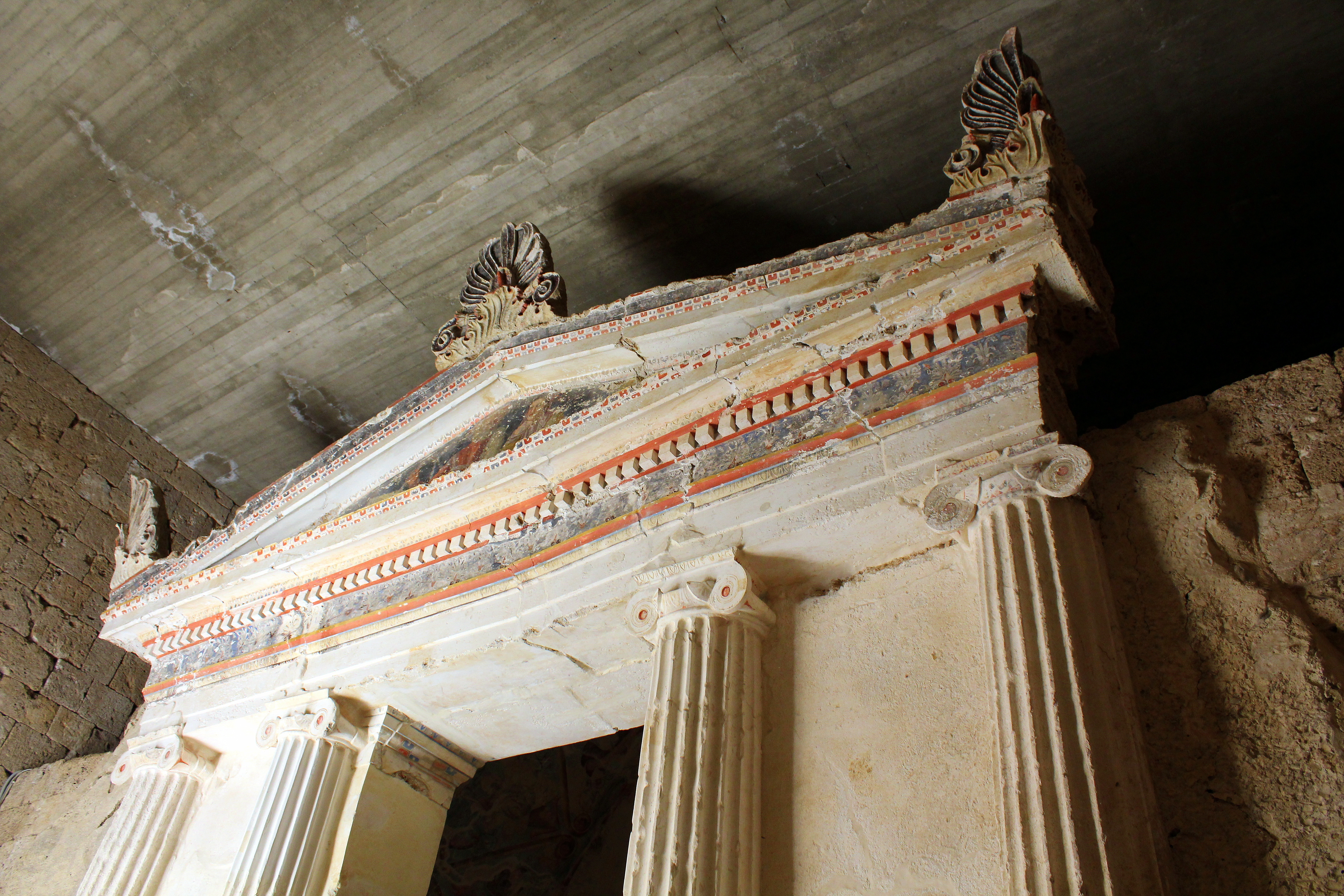
Facade of the tomb

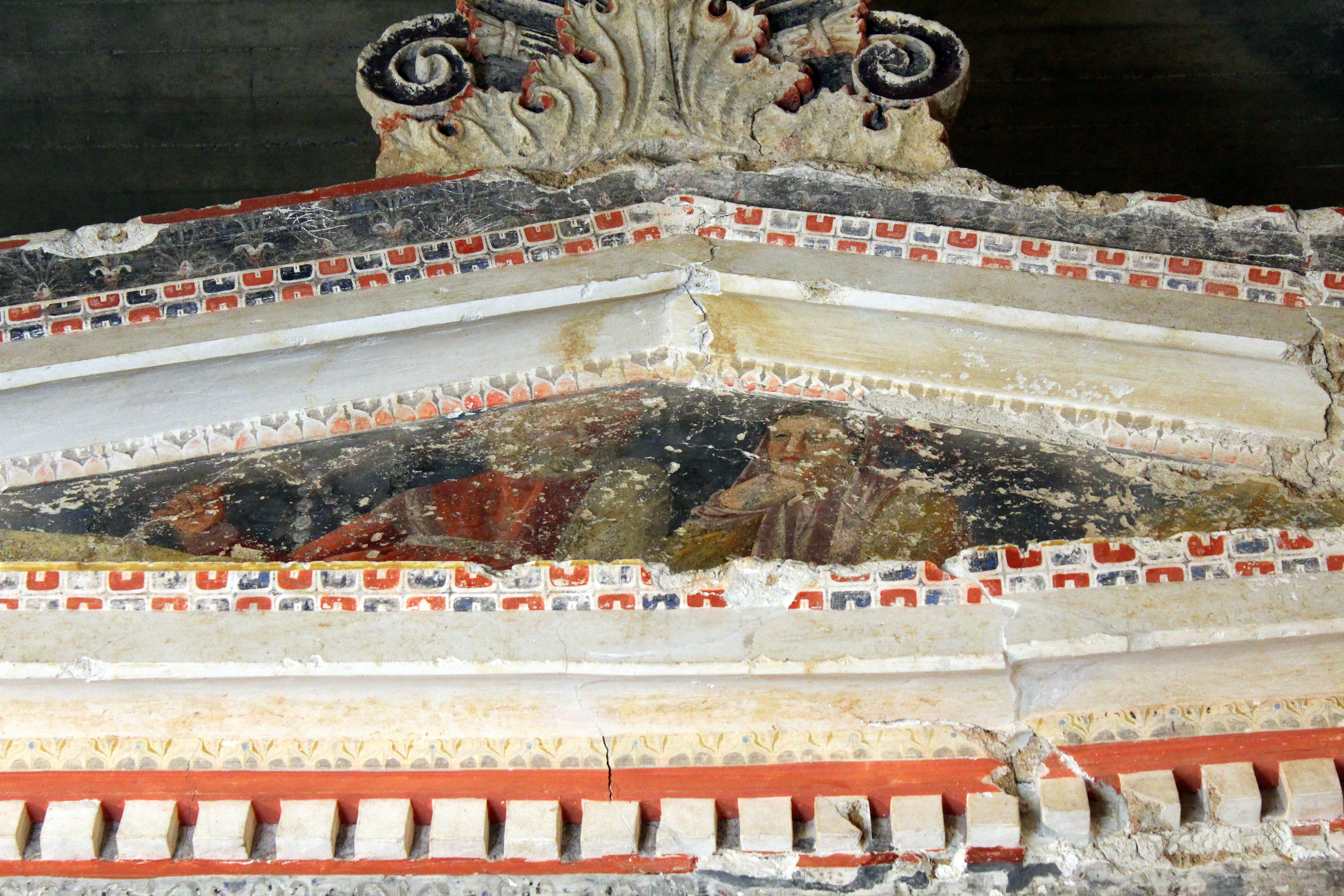
Painting of an old man and woman in the tympanum of the facade.

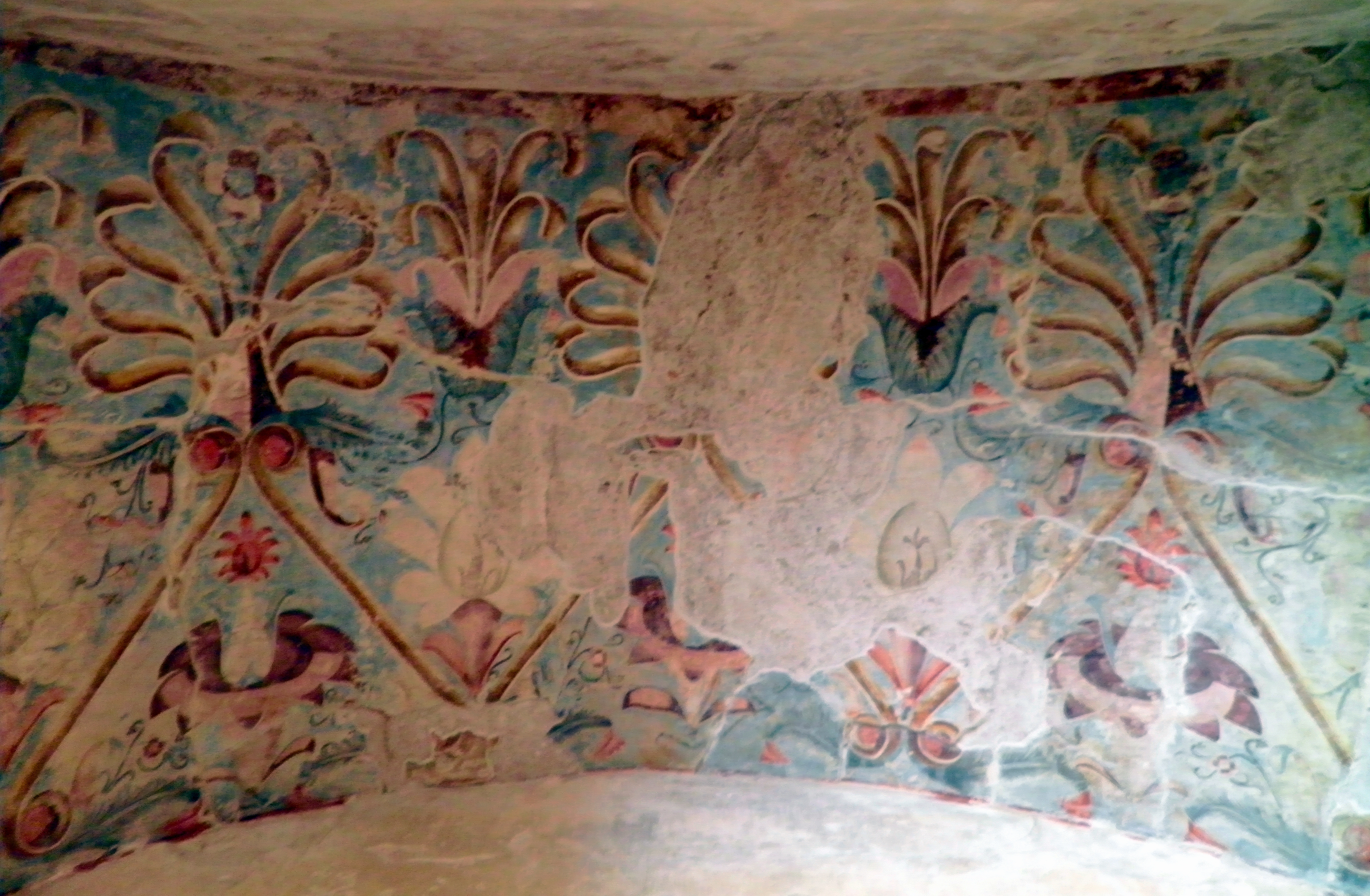
Detail of the palmettes on the ceiling of the antechamber, which give the tomb its name.

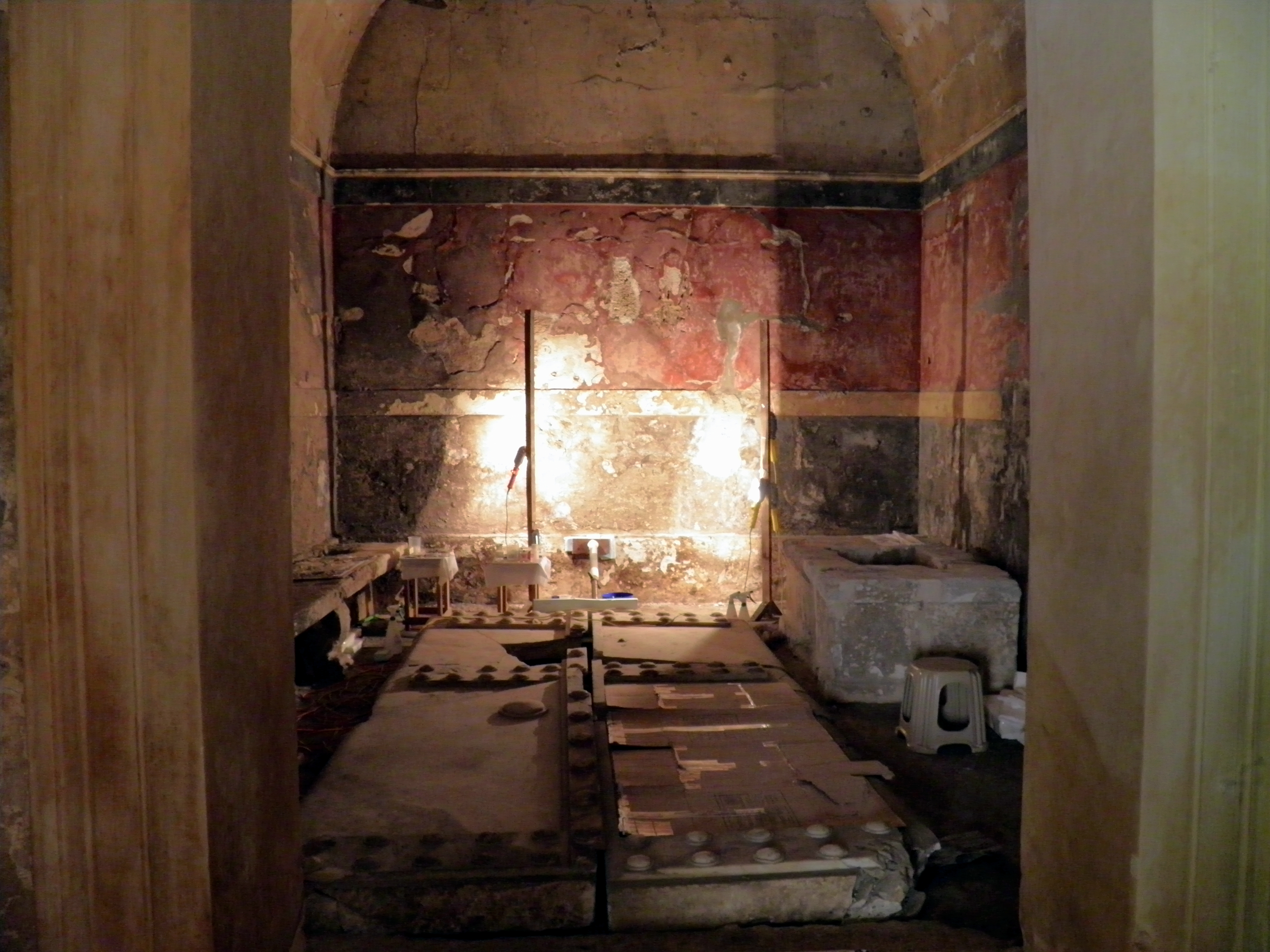
View into the burial chamber from the antechamber

The Tomb of the Palmettes (Greek: Τάφος των Ανθεμίων, romanized: tafos tōn anthemiōn), sometimes known as the Rhomiopoulou Tomb, is an ancient Macedonian tomb of the Hellenistic period in Mieza (modern Lefkadia, near Naousa, Imathia), Macedonia, Greece, noted for the quality of its painted decoration. It was built in the first half of the third century BC.

== Description ==
The tomb consists of a monumental facade and two vaulted chambers (an antechamber and a burial chamber), covered over by an earthen tumulus 2.5 m high and 15-17 m in diameter.

=== Facade ===
The facade is shaped like that of a Greek temple, with four engaged Ionic columns supporting an architrave and a pediment. The metre-high triangular tympanum is painted with a depiction of an old man and woman, who are presumably the tomb's occupants, lying together on a couch at a symposium. Both are depicted in three-quarter view, facing left. The man lies on the left, wearing a white chiton and a red himation with a purple border. He has a grey beard and holds a temple key in his right hand, probably indicating that he held a religious office. His head turns to the right, to look at the old woman, who is presumably his wife. She wears a yellow chiton and a purple himation, and props her head up with her right arm. The background is dark blue. Unusually, there are antefixes on the apex of the pediment and at each corner. These are shaped like palmettes. Six blocks of poros stone sealed the tomb's entrance.

=== Interior ===
The antechamber is 4.10 m wide and 2 m long. The lower part of the walls is painted black and the upper part is white, with bands of black and white separating the two sections. The unique painted design on the ceiling, consisting of six palmettes and water lilies on a light blue background, is the source of the tomb's modern name. A large marble double door (3.5 m tall and 0.9 m wide) in the rear wall of the chamber led to the burial chamber. It was found in pieces, shattered in antiquity when the tomb was robbed.

The burial chamber is 4.05 m wide and 5.1 m long. The walls are painted to resemble marble revetment, with the lower part in black, the upper part in red, and a white band separating the two sections. The ceiling is painted yellow. A stone base on the right side of this chamber toward the rear once supported the larnax, which contained the ashes of the deceased occupant of the tomb, but it was taken when the tomb was robbed in ancient times. Several fragments of ivory sculpture have been recovered, which apparently derive from battle scenes and Dionysiac scenes that once decorated a wooden couch.

== Excavation ==
The tomb was discovered in 1971 after illegal excavations. It was then excavated by Katerina Rhomiopoulou from 1971 to 1973. A metal structure was built over the tomb in 1988 to protect it from the elements, but restoration work is still ongoing.

== Bibliography ==
- Rhomiopoulou, Katerina; Schmidt-Dounas, Barbara (2010). Das Palmettengrab in Lefkadia. Mainz: Zabern. ISBN 978-3-8053-4206-3.
