= Pierus =

Pierus (/ˈpaɪərəs/; Ancient Greek: Πίερος), in Greek mythology, is a name attributed to two individuals:

- Pierus, the eponym of Pieria, son of Makednos and father of the Pierides.
- Pierus, son of Thessalian Magnes and father of Hyacinth, possible lover of Clio, muse of history.
- Pierus, possibly the accurate name of Perius, one of the sons of Aegyptus, who married and was killed by his cousin Hyale, daughter of Danaus.
