= Archaeological Museum of Veroia =

Archaeological museum in Veroia, Greece

Coordinates: 40.5294°N 22.2066°E

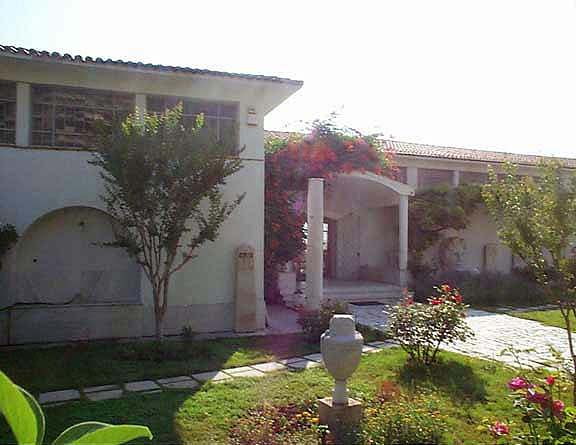
Outside view

The Archaeological Museum of Veroia is one of the most important archaeological museums in Macedonia, Greece. The museum was established in 1965 in a building constructed especially for the purpose in Elia. Finds from the Palaeolithic to the Ottoman period are displayed in its three halls.

The Neolithic finds come from the settlement at Nea Nikomedeia, which is believed to be the oldest known permanent settlement in Europe. The Iron Age finds come from the cemetery of Vergina.

In the first hall are special showcases displaying a bronze kalpis or cinerary urn of the fourth century BC, a red-figure bell crater of the Kertsch type of the fourth century BC, and a bronze hydria kalpis used as a cinerary urn of the fourth century BC from the north-east cemetery of Veroia, and a reconstruction of a single-chambered rock-cut family tomb of the Hellenistic period, which was excavated in Veroia. Various other showcases display groups of finds from pit graves, cist graves, and rock-cut graves excavated in Veroia’s north-east, south-east, and south-west cemeteries. These groups illustrate the development of pottery and koroplastics from the end of the fifth to the end of the second century BC.

The second hall contains mainly grave stelai and Hellenistic and Roman reliefs of the first century BC from the Veroia area. Of particular note are the stela bearing the Gymnasiarch’s Law, which describes how middle and senior education was conducted in the Veroia Gymnasium, and the hunter-and-boar group, which is part of the sculptural decoration of a third-century BC grave monument from Vergina. The most notable of the stelai are those of Paterinos Antigonou and Adea Kassandrou.

The third hall contains exhibits of the Roman period, most notably an inscribed bust of the river god Olganos of the second century AD, which was found at Kopanos and is in excellent condition. There are also a grave relief of a husband and wife (second century AD), which was found in Veroia, burial offerings from a cist grave of the Roman period (third century AD), and terracotta figurines from an early Roman tomb.

Outside the museum are dozens of sarcophagi, grave stelai, and statues, the most impressive of all being a head of Medusa, a work of the second century BC, which must have been built into the north wall of the city.

During the years 2020-2021, the Archaeological Museum underwent significant structural renovations on the main building, as well as in the garden. The artefacts that were located in the garden, were placed on a newly built wall for better view from the citizens and visitors of the city.

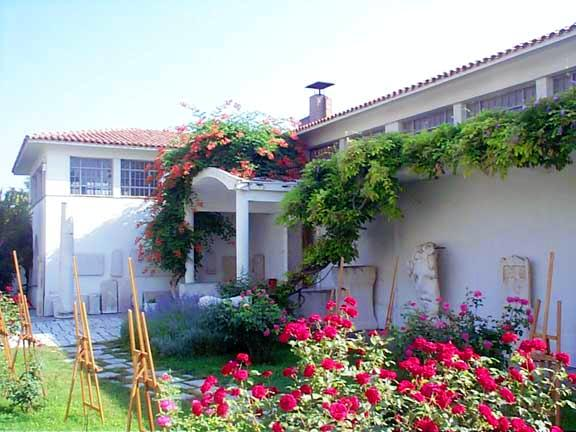
Another outside view

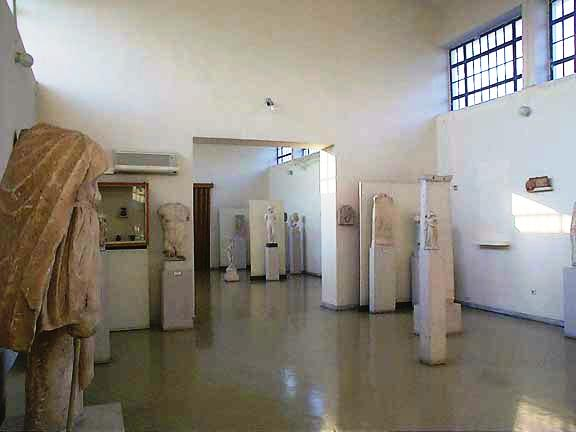
View of the 2nd room

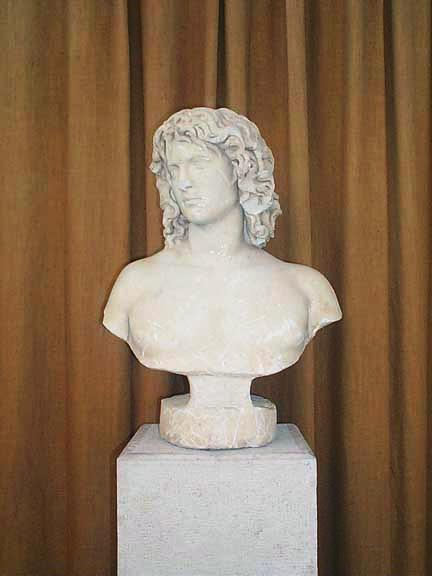
The Local God Olganos

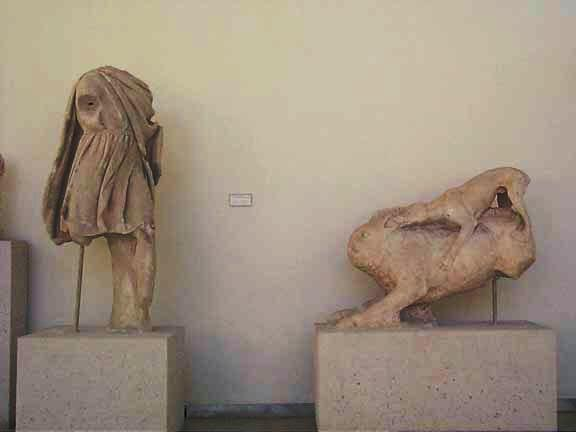
The Hunter and Boar Group

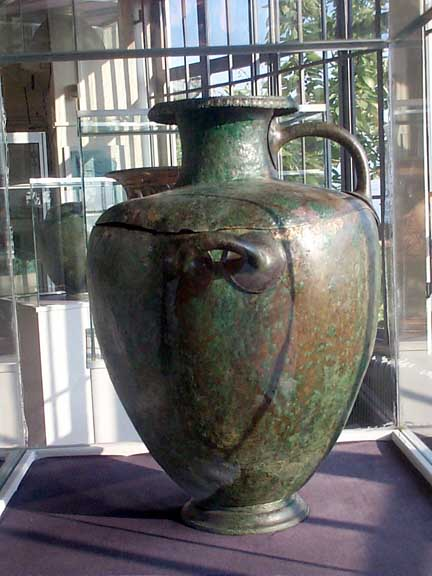
A Bronze Hydria Kalpis

== Sources ==
- This article incorporates text from the corresponding article at the Museums of Macedonia website, commissioned by the Macedonian Heritage foundation, written by Vlasis Vlasidis, and published under a CC-BY-SA-3.0 license.
