= Thyia (daughter of Deucalion) =

Greek mythological figure

In Greek mythology, Thyia (/ˈθaɪə/; Ancient Greek: Θυία, romanized: Thuía, lit. 'derived from the verb θύω 'to sacrifice') was the daughter of Deucalion. Thyia bore to Zeus two sons, Magnes and Makednos, the latter of whom was considered the eponym of Macedonia. This genealogy comes from Hesiod's lost work, the Catalogue of Women, as preserved in the De Thematibus of Constantine Porphyrogenitus.
