= Pindus (mythology) =

Pindus (Ancient Greek: Πίνδος), in Greek mythology, was the son of Makednos. He was friend with a snake and when his three brothers killed Pindus, the snake took revenge by killing them.
