= Beres (mythology) =

Son of Makednos in Greek mythology

In Greek mythology, Beres (Ancient Greek: Βέρης) was the son of Makednos, according to Theagenes (2nd century BC) in his Makedonika, who is quoted by Stephanus of Byzantium, and father of Mieza, Beroea and Olganos.
