= Coenus =

Coenus or Koinos may refer to:

- Coenus of Macedon (fl. 778–750 BC), a King of Macedon
- Coenus (general) (fl. 334–326 BC), a general of Alexander the Great
- Coenus (bug), a shield bug genus in the tribe Pentatomini
