= Clio =

Muse of history in Ancient Greek mythology

- Goddess of history and lyre playing
- Member of The Muses
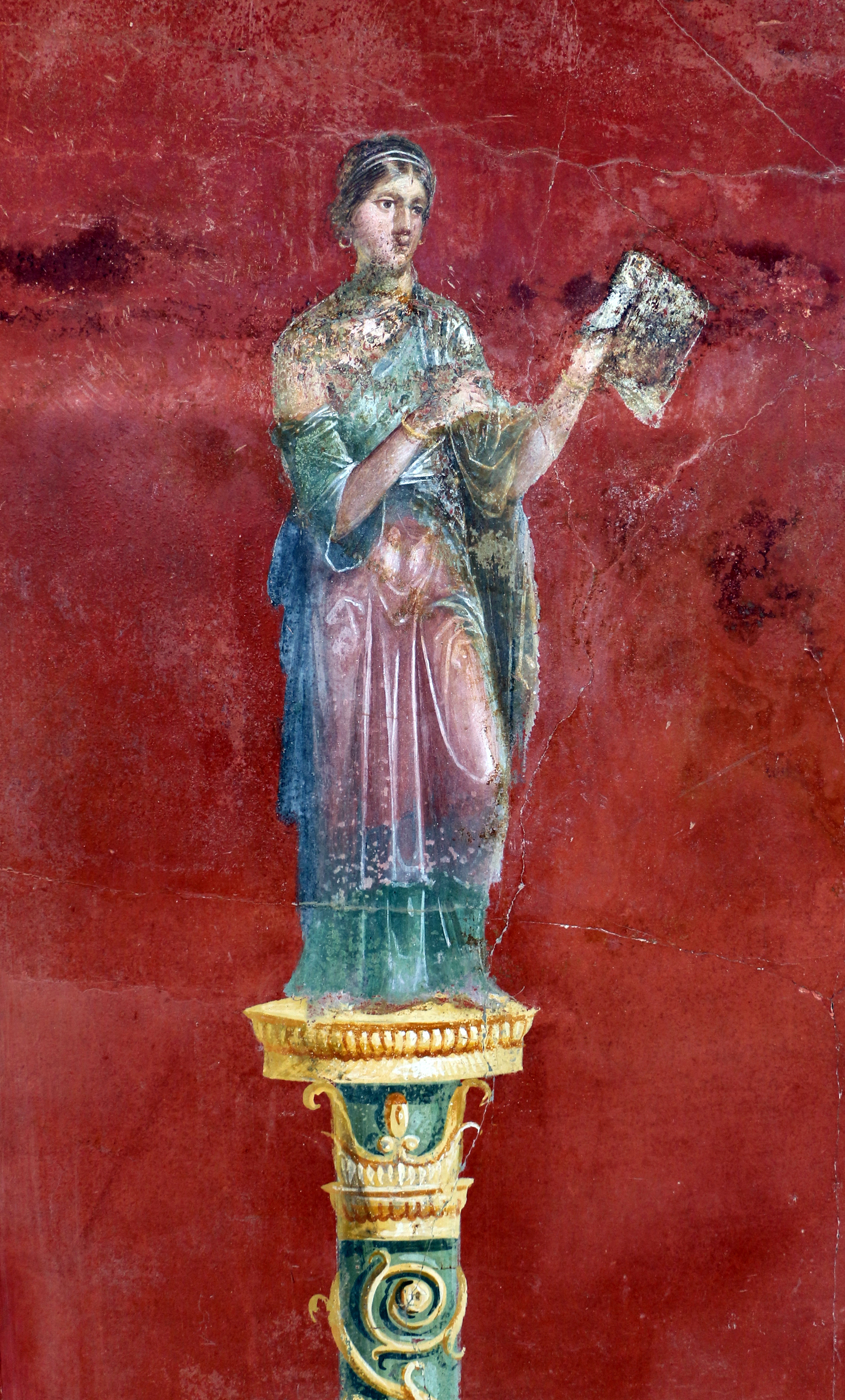
- Clio on an antique fresco from Pompeii
- Abode: Mount Olympus
- Symbols: Scrolls, books

Genealogy
- Parents: Zeus and Mnemosyne
- Siblings: Euterpe, Polyhymnia, Urania, Calliope, Erato, Thalia, Terpsichore, Melpomene and several paternal half-siblings
- Consort: Pierus
- Children: Hymenaeus, Hyacinthus

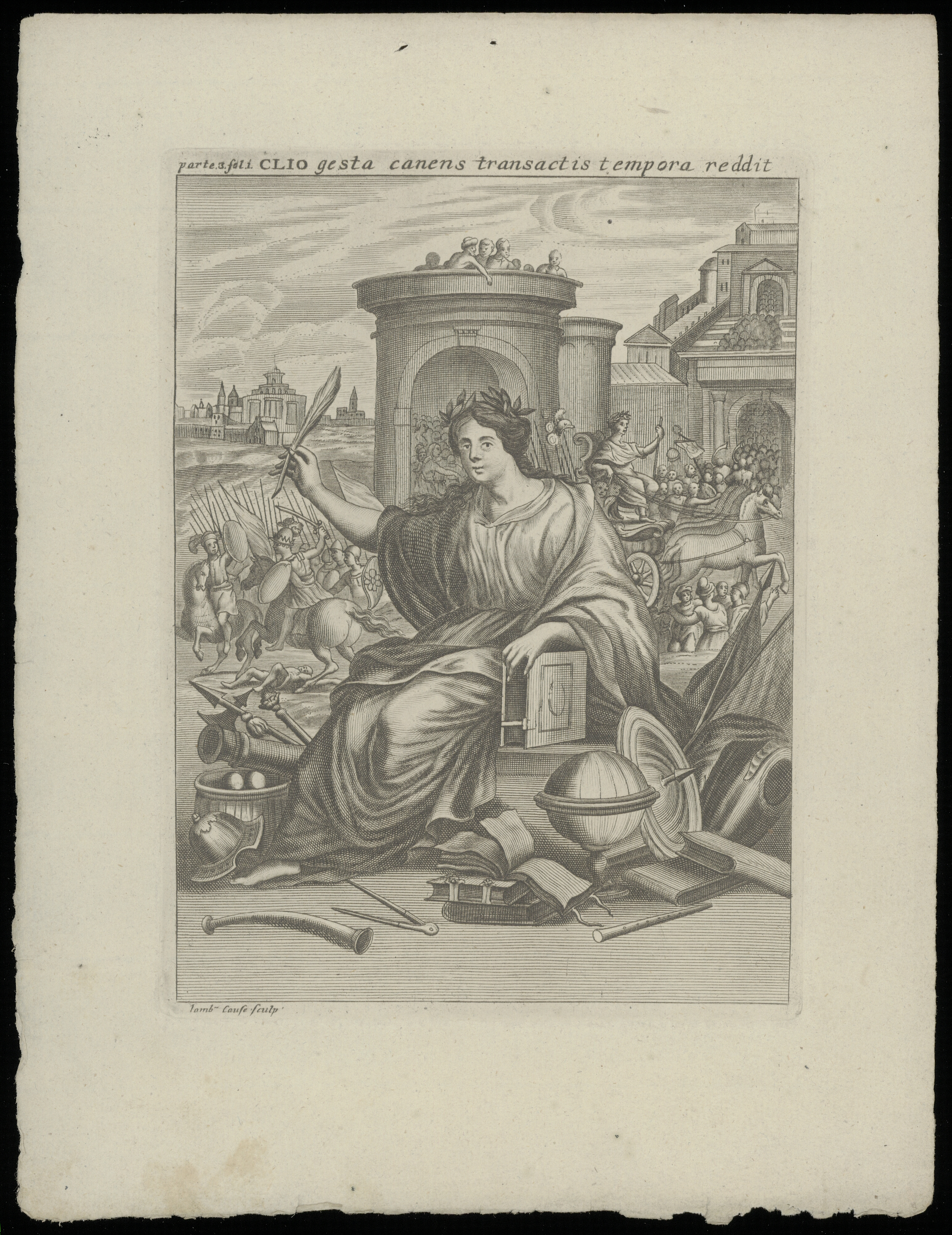
Print of Clio, made in the 16th–17th century. Preserved at the Ghent University Library.

In Greek mythology, Clio (traditionally /ˈklaɪoʊ/, but now more frequently /ˈkliːoʊ/; Ancient Greek: Κλειώ, romanized: Kleiṓ), also spelled Kleio, Cleio, or Cleo, is the muse of history, or in a few mythological accounts, the muse of lyre-playing.

== Etymology ==
Clio's name is derived from the Greek root κλέω/κλείω (meaning "to recount", "to make famous" or "to celebrate"). The name's traditional Latinisation is Clio, but some modern systems such as the American Library Association-Library of Congress system use K to represent the original Greek kappa, and ei to represent the diphthong ει (epsilon iota), thus Kleio.

== Depiction ==
Clio, sometimes referred to as "the Proclaimer", is often represented with an open parchment scroll, a book, or a set of tablets. She is also shown with the heroic trumpet and the clepsydra (water clock). Cesare Ripa's Iconologia, an important source book for artists of the Baroque period, stated that Clio should be depicted with a crown of laurels, a trumpet and an open book.

== Mythology ==
Like all the muses, Clio is a daughter of Zeus and the Titaness Mnemosyne, goddess of memory. Along with her sister Muses, she is considered to dwell at either Mount Helicon or Mount Parnassos. Other common locations for the Muses are Pieria in Thessaly, near to Mount Olympus.

She had one son, Hyacinth, with one of several kings, in various myths—with Pierus or with king Oebalus of Sparta, or with king Amyclas, progenitor of the people of Amyclae, dwellers about Sparta. In a scholium to Euripides' Rhesus, she is also the mother of Hymenaeus and Rhesus. According to Apollodorus, Clio was made to fall in love with Pierus by Aphrodite, for Clio had derided her for her love affair with Adonis. Other accounts credit her as the mother of Linus by Magnes, a poet who was buried at Argos, although Linus has a number of differing parents depending upon the account, including several accounts in which he is the son of Clio's sisters Urania or Calliope.

== Legacy ==
In her capacity as "the proclaimer, glorifier and celebrator of history, great deeds and accomplishments" Clio is used in the name of various modern brands, including the Clio Awards for excellence in advertising.

The Cambridge University History Society is informally referred to as Clio; the Cleo of Alpha Chi society at Trinity College, Connecticut, is named after the muse. Likewise, the undergraduate student outreach group for the Penn Museum at the University of Pennsylvania is known as the Clio Society, and the first sorority founded at SUNY Geneseo, Phi Kappa Pi, began as the Alpha Clionian literary society. "Clio" also represents history in some coined words in academic usage: cliometrics, cliodynamics.

Clio Bay in Antarctica is named after the muse, as is the city of Clio, Michigan.

== Gallery ==
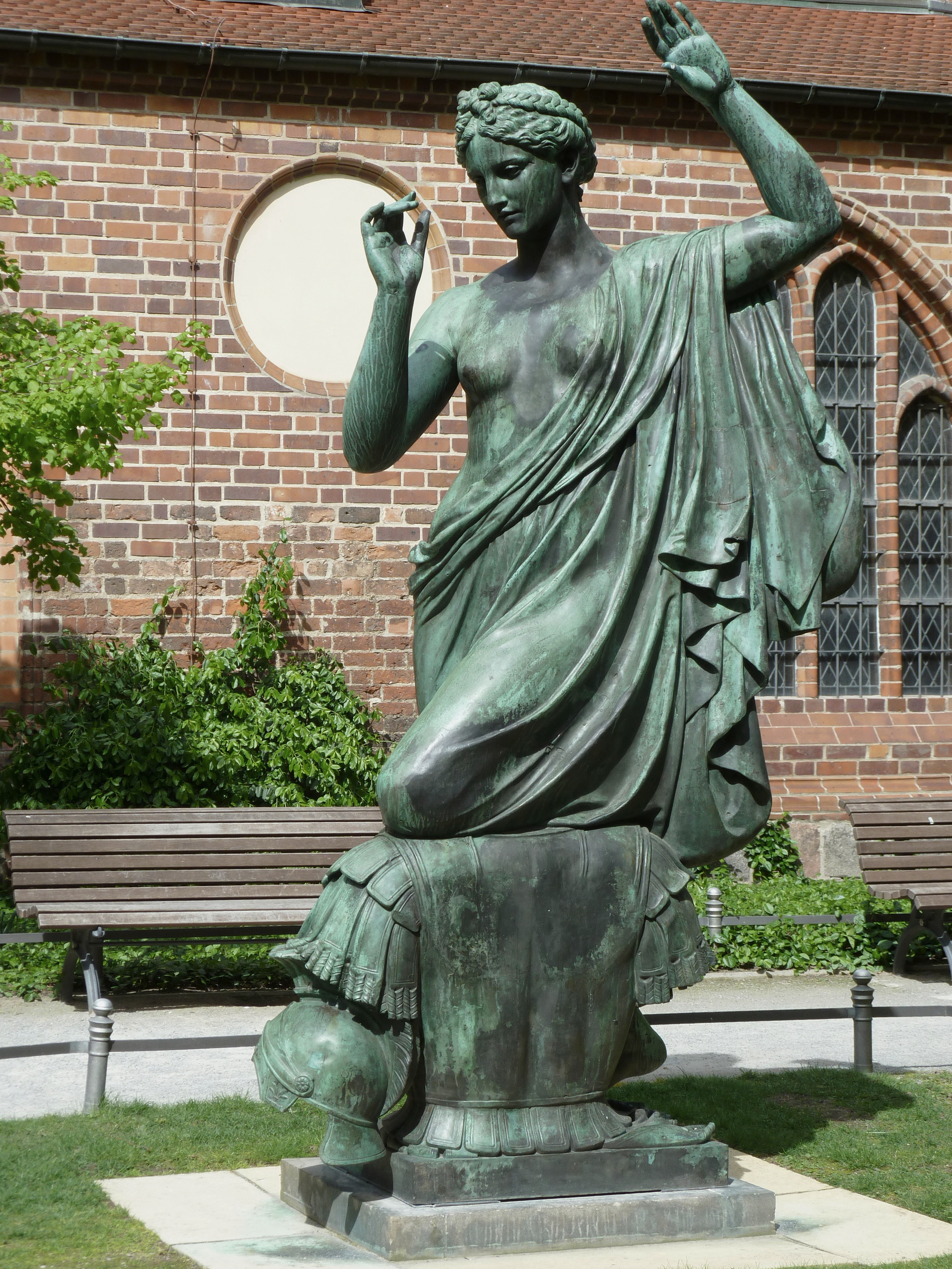
Statue of Clio by Albert Wolff in Berlin

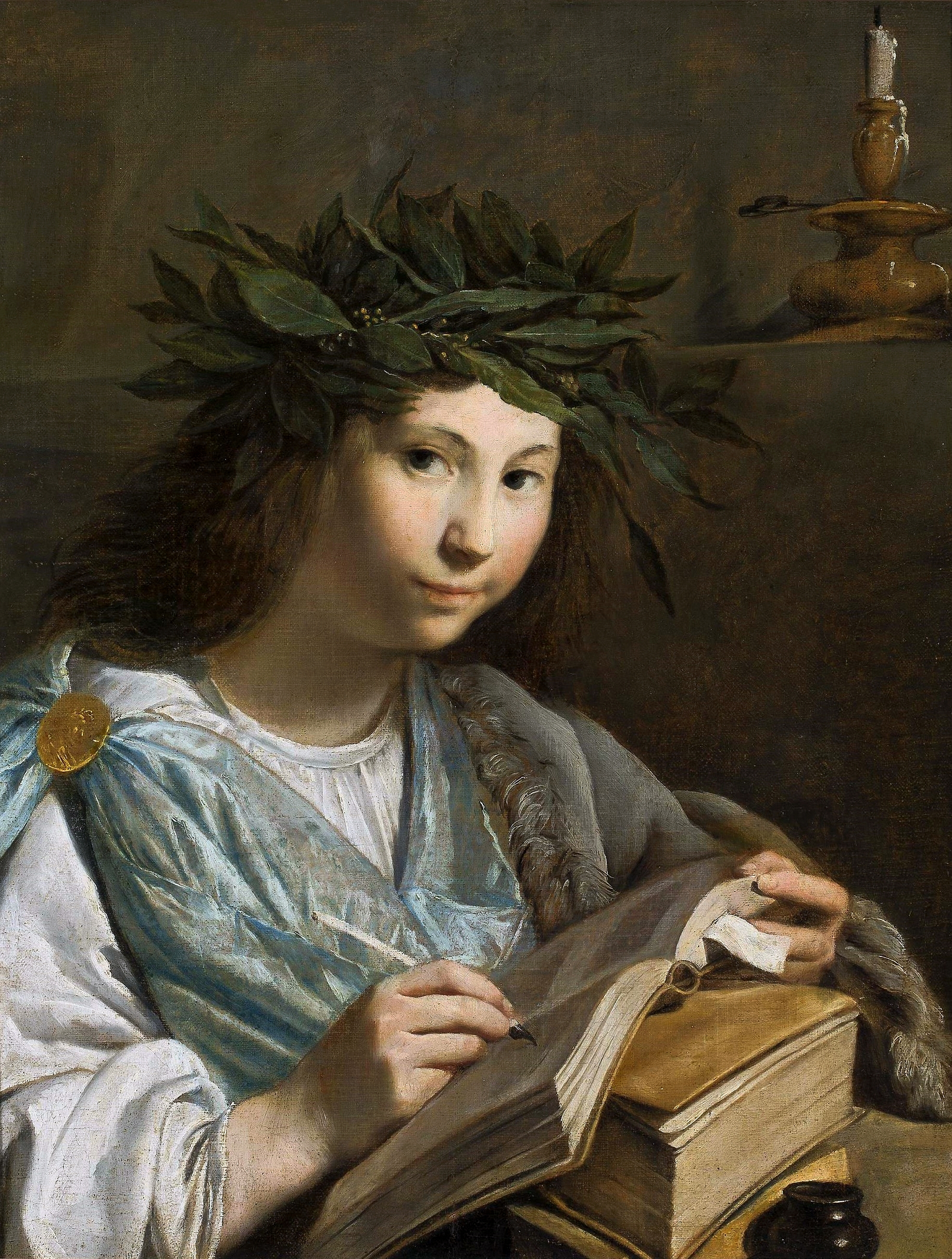
Clio, Muse of History by Johannes Moreelse

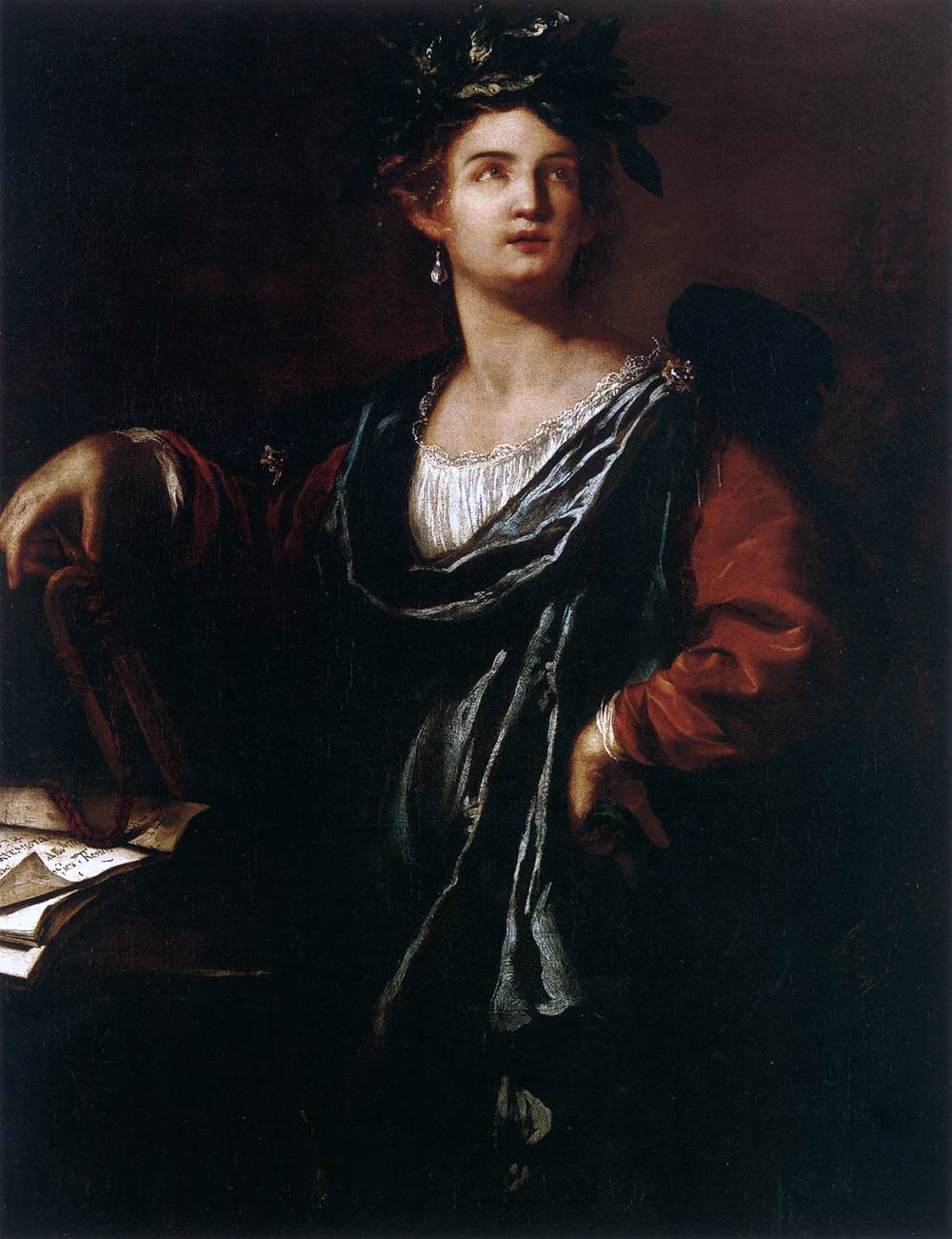
Clio, the Muse of History (1632) by Artemisia Gentileschi.

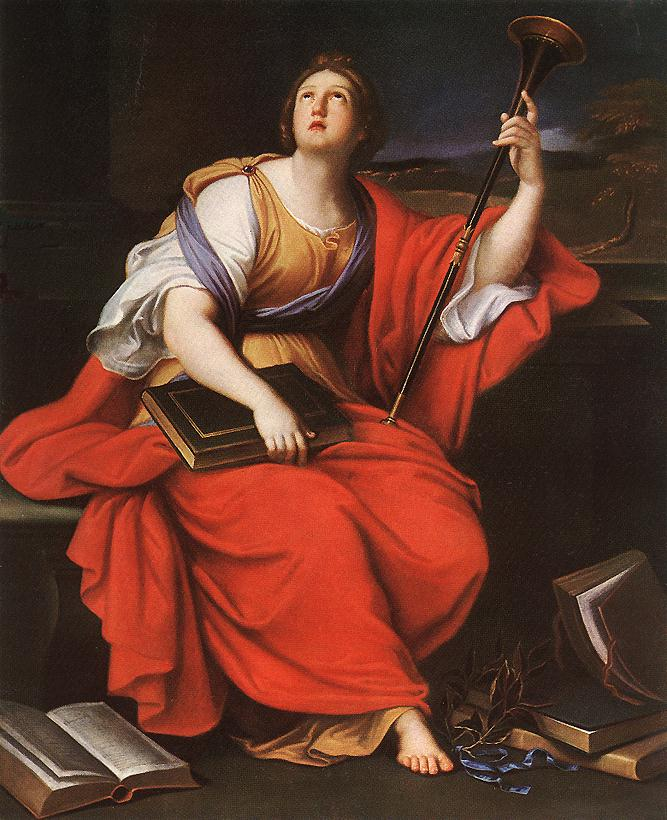
The Muse Clio (c. 1689) by Pierre Mignard

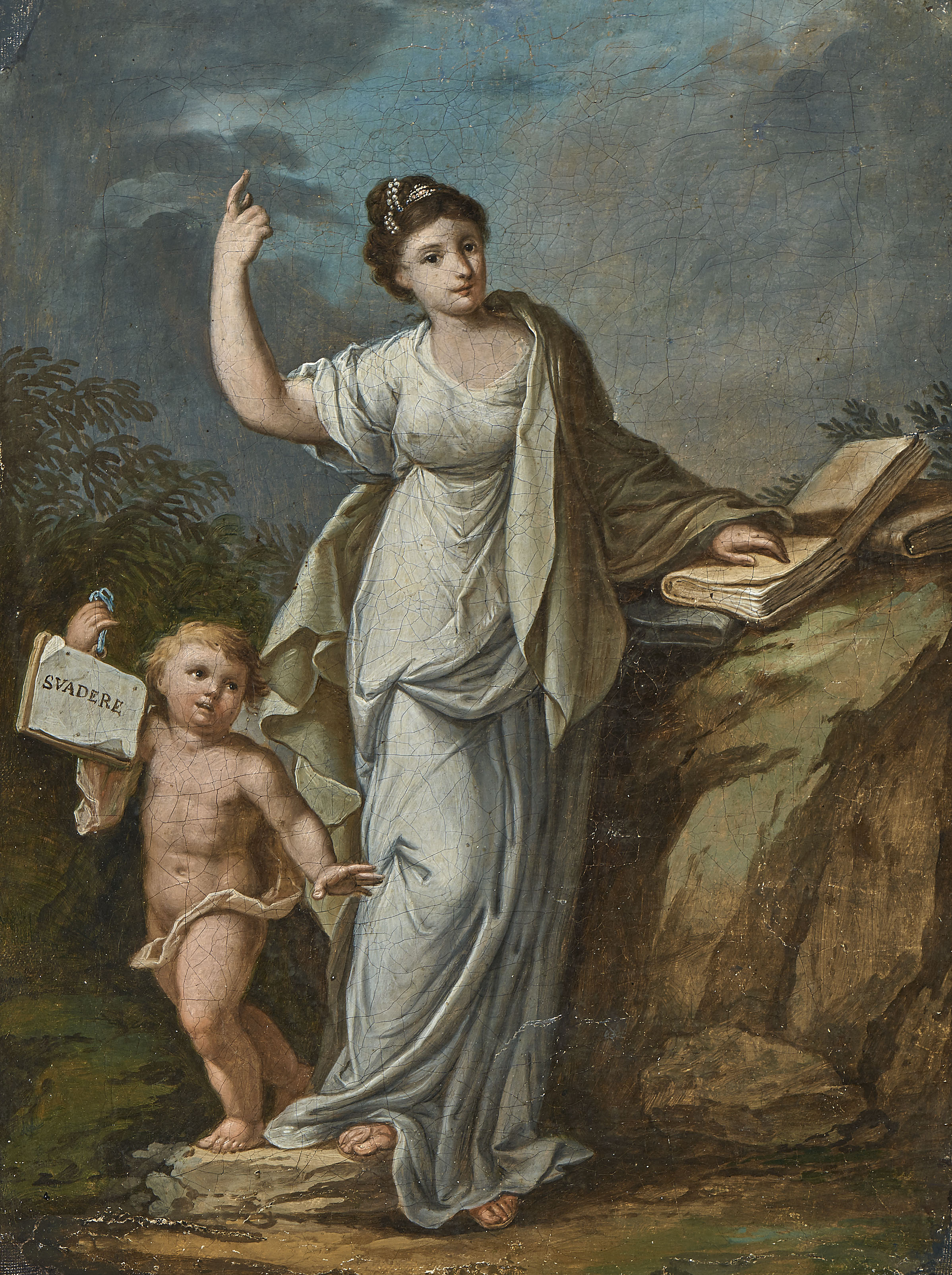
The Muse Clio by Bernhard Rode

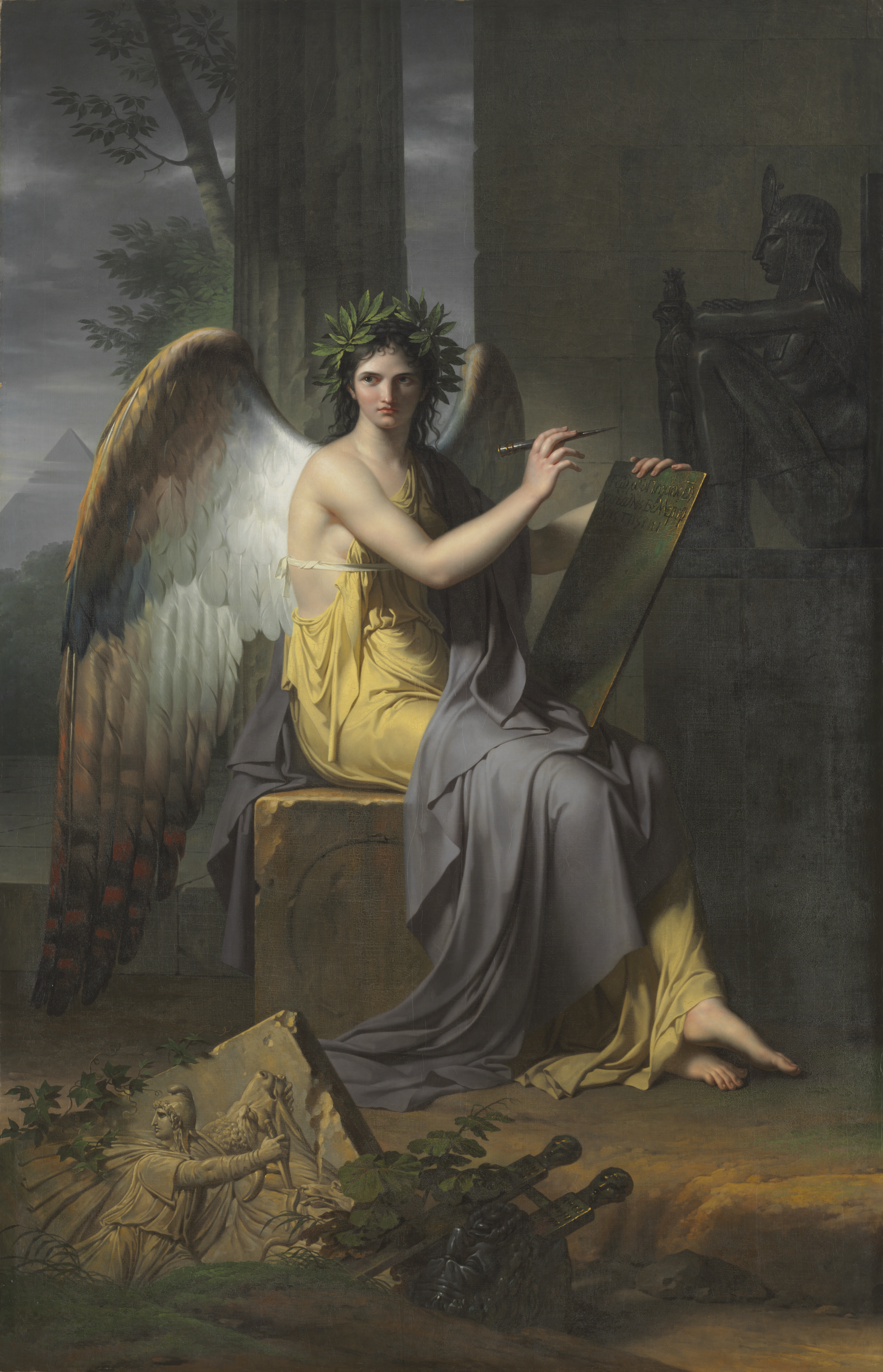
Clio, Muse of History (1800) by Charles Meynier

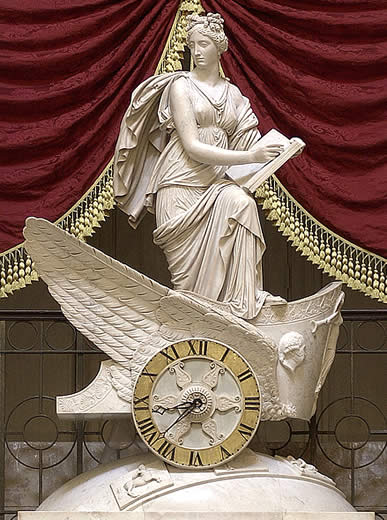
Car of History, a chariot clock depicting Clio, by Carlo Franzoni, 1819, in National Statuary Hall

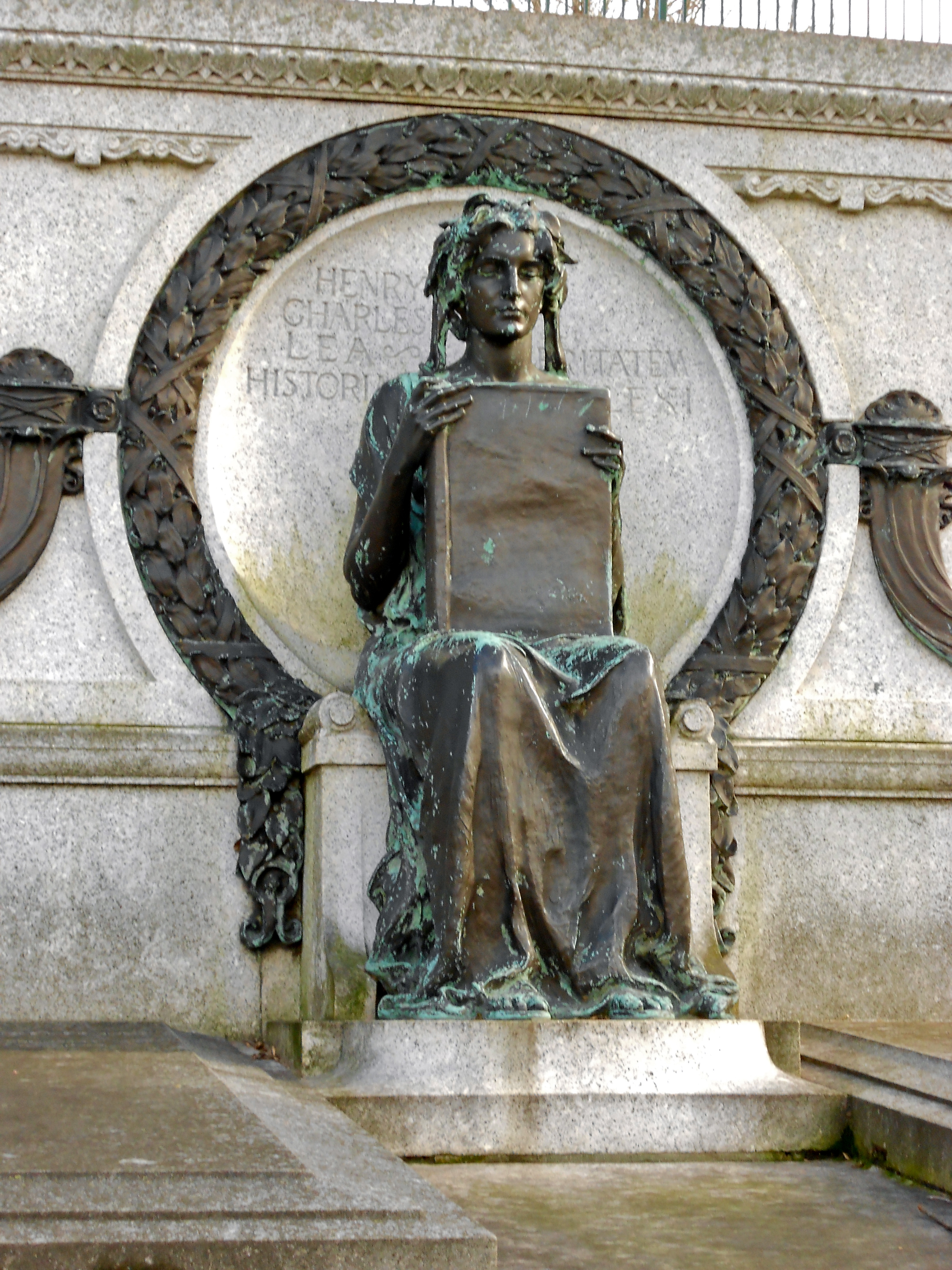
Sculpture of Clio by Alexander Stirling Calder on the tomb of historian Henry Charles Lea

== See also ==
- Muses in popular culture
