= Olganos =

Ancient Greek river god

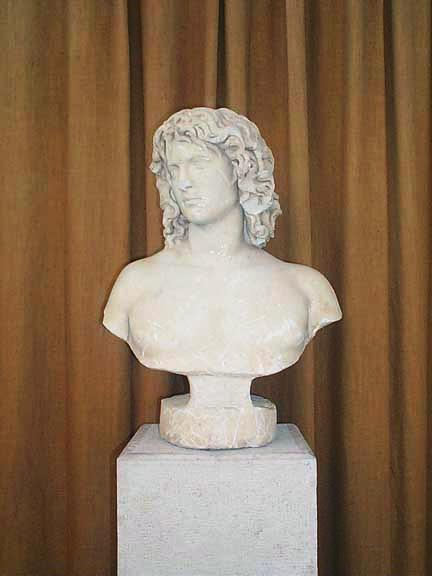
Bust of Olganos, on display at the Archaeological Museum, Veria

In Greek mythology, Olganos (Ancient Greek: Ὄλγανος) was a river god and the son of Beres.

== Family ==
Olganos is the offspring of Beres and the brother of Mieza and Beroia. He is said to be the eponym of the river of the same name.

== Archaeology ==
There is attestation of Olganos's cult in the Macedonian town of Mieza. An inscribed bust of Olganos (circa. 2nd century) was found at Kopanos / Emathia and is now on display at the Archaeological Museum in Veria, Greece.
