= Macedonius =

Macedonius may refer to:

- Macedonius of Syria, or Macedonius Kritophagus, 4th/5th century saint in the Eastern Orthodox Church
- Macedonius I of Constantinople, 4th century Greek bishop of Constantinople
- Macedonius II of Constantinople, patriarch of Constantinople 495–511
- Macedonius of Thessalonica, or Macedonius Consul, 6th century Byzantine court dignity and author
- Macedonius, a patriarch of Aquileia 539–556
