= Theagenes (historian) =

Theagenes (Greek: Θεαγένης) was a historical writer, of uncertain date. Stephanus of Byzantium frequently quotes from a work of his, entitled Macedonica (s. v. Altus (Mygdonia) ), as also from another entitled Carica. It is, perhaps, the same Theagenes, who wrote a work on Aegina, quoted by John Tzetzes. He is one of the authors (= FGrHist 774) whose fragments were collected in Felix Jacoby's Fragmente der griechischen Historiker.
