= Agenor =

Phoenician king in Greek mythology and history

Agenor (Ancient Greek: Ἀγήνωρ or Αγήνορι, romanized: Agēnor, lit. 'heroic, manly') was in Greek mythology and history a Phoenician king of Tyre or Sidon. The Greek historian Herodotus (c. 484–425 BC), born in the city of Halicarnassus under the Achaemenid Empire, estimated that Agenor lived either 1000 or 1600 years prior to his visit to Tyre in 450 BC at the end of the Greco-Persian Wars (499–449 BC). He was said to have reigned in that city for 63 years.

== Family ==
Agenor was born in Memphis, Egypt to Poseidon and Libya and he had a twin brother named Belus. The latter remained in Egypt and reigned over there while Agenor departed to Phoenicia and reigned there. In a rare version of the myth, Agenor and Belus had another brother named Enyalios. According to other sources, he was the son of Belus and brother of Phineus, Phoenix, Aegyptus and Danaus. This tradition was followed by Tzetzes but he added Ninus as one of the six brothers. The same author claimed that there were two Agenors, the first one being the brother of Belus while the second was the son of the latter, thus nephew of the first Agenor.

Sources differed also as to Agenor's children; he was said to have been the father of Europa, Cadmus, Cilix, Phoenix, Phineus, Thasus and sometimes, Syros and Cepheus. Agenor's wife was variously given as Telephassa, Argiope, Antiope, and Tyro, with the latter giving her name to the city of Tyre. According to Pherecydes of Athens, his first wife was Damno, daughter of Belus, who bore him Phoenix and two daughters, Isaia and Melia, who married Aegyptus and Danaus, respectively; Agenor then fathered Cadmus with Argiope, daughter of the river-god Neilus.

In the Iliad, however, Europa was clearly a daughter of Phoenix. Either Cadmus or Europa were confirmed as children of Phoenix by the Ehoeae attributed to Hesiod, Bacchylides, Moschus and various scholia. Cilix and Phineus were also sons of Phoenix according to Pherecydes, who also added an otherwise unknown son named Doryclus.

Most later sources listed Cadmus and Cilix as sons of Agenor directly without mentioning Phoenix. On the rare occasions when he was mentioned, Phoenix was listed as the brother of Cadmus and Cilix. Whether he was included as a brother of Agenor or as a son, his role in mythology was limited to inheriting his father's kingdom and to becoming the eponym of the Phoenicians. All accounts agreed on a Phoenician king who has several children, including the two sons named Cadmus and Cilix and a daughter named Europa.

A certain Eidothea, wife of Phineus, was called the sister of Cadmus and thus maybe the daughter of Agenor. Taygete, usually one of the Pleiades and mother of Lacedemon by Zeus was also said to be the daughter of Agenor.

Comparative table of Agenor's family
Relation	Names	Sources																	
Relation	Names	Hes.	Pher.		Bacc.	Euripides	Sophoc.	Hdt.	Apollon.		Dio.	Val.	Apd.	Dic.	Hyg.	Pau.	Non.	Tzet.	Mal.
Relation	Names	Ehoiai	Pher.		Dithy.	Sch. Phoe.	Sch. Anti.	Hdt.	Arg.	Sch.	Dio.	Val.	Apd.	Dic.	Fab.	Pau.	Non.	Tzet.	Mal.
Parents	Poseidon and Libya												✓						✓
Parents	Belus																✓	✓	
Wife	Damno		✓																
Wife	Argiope			✓					✓						✓				
Wife	Antiope					✓												✓	
Wife	Telephassa												✓						
Wife	Tyro																		✓
Children	Europa										✓		✓		✓		✓		✓
Children	Cadmus			✓	✓	✓		✓	✓		✓		✓		✓	✓	✓	✓	✓
Children	Phoenix	✓	✓										✓		✓			✓	✓
Children	Cilix							✓					✓		✓		✓	✓	✓
Children	Isaia		✓							✓									
Children	Melia		✓							✓									
Children	Eidothea						✓												
Children	Phineus								✓			✓	✓	✓	✓				
Children	Taygete													✓					
Children	Thasus															✓	✓		
Children	Cepheus																✓		
Children	Syros																		✓

== Mythology ==
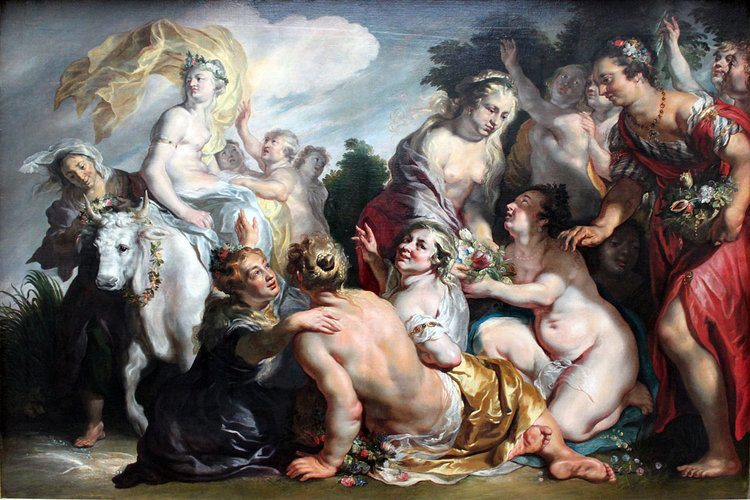
The Rape of Europa, a painting by Jacob Jordaens (1615 version)

Zeus saw Agenor's daughter Europa gathering flowers and immediately fell in love with her. Zeus transformed himself into a white bull and carried Europa away to the island of Crete. He then revealed his true identity and Europa became the first queen of Crete. Agenor, meanwhile, sent Europa's brothers, Cadmus and Cilix in search of her, telling them not to return without her. In some versions of the tale, Agenor sends her other brothers as well: Phineus or Thasus (and of course Phoenix in the versions in which Cadmus's father is Agenor).

As Europa could not be found, none of the brothers returned. Cadmus consulted the oracle of Delphi and was advised to travel until encountering a cow. He was to follow this cow and to found a city where the cow would lie down; this city became Thebes. Cilix searched for her and settled down in Asia Minor. The land was called Cilicia after him.

According to the chronicler Malalas, when Agenor was about to die, he ordered that all the land he had conquered be divided among his three sons. Phoenix took Tyre and its hinterland, and called the country Phoenicia after himself. Similarly, Syros call the country allotted to him Syria. Likewise, Cilix called the latitudes allotted to him Cilicia.

== Identity and deeds ==
Virgil called Carthage the city of Agenor, by which he alluded to the descent of Dido from Agenor. German philologist Philipp Karl Buttmann pointed out that the genuine Phoenician name of Agenor was Chnas or Khna, which was the same as Canaan, and upon these facts he built the hypothesis that Agenor or Chnas was the same as the Canaan in the books of Moses. Quintus Curtius Rufus considered Agenor to have been the founder of Sidon, and he was also popularly supposed to have introduced the Phoenician alphabet, which was later taught by Cadmus to the Greeks and became the foundation of their own writing system.

== Argive family tree ==
Argive genealogy in Greek mythology

Oceanus	Tethys
Inachus	Melia
Zeus	Io	Phoroneus
Epaphus	Memphis
Libya	Poseidon
Achiroë	Belus	Agenor	Telephassa
Danaus	Elephantis	Aegyptus	Cadmus	Cilix	Europa	Phoenix
Mantineus	Hypermnestra	Lynceus	Harmonia	Zeus
Sparta	Lacedaemon	Ocalea	Abas	Polydorus	Agave	Sarpedon	Rhadamanthus
Eurydice	Acrisius	Autonoë	Ino	Minos
Zeus	Danaë	Semele	Zeus
Perseus	Dionysus

Colour key:

Male
Female
Deity
