= Alope (spring) =

Alope (Ancient Greek: Ἀλόπη, romanized: Alópē) was a famed spring on the road from Eleusis to Megara, which was, according to legend, the result of Poseidon changing the body of Alope into a spring bearing her name. Adjacent to the spring, there was a monument of Alope on the spot where she was believed to have been killed by her father, Cercyon.
