= Tyro (mythology) =

In Greek mythology, Tyro (/ˈtaɪroʊ/; Ancient Greek: Τυρώ, romanized: Tȳrō) may refer to two distinct women:

- Tyro, a Phoenician queen as the wife of King Agenor who named after her the newly built city of Tyre. She became the mother of his sons: Cadmus, Phoenix, Syros, Cilix, and, a daughter, Europa. In other accounts, the spouse of Agenor was variously given as Telephassa, Argiope, Antiope, and Damno.
- Tyro, mother of the twins, Neleus and Pelias, by Poseidon.
- Tyros, a Phoenician nymph and lover of Heracles.
