= Argiope =

Argiope ('silver face') may refer to:

- Argiope (mythology), several figures from Greek mythology
- Argiope (spider), a genus of spiders which includes the St Andrew's Cross spider and the wasp spider
