= Syrus =

Son of Apollo in Greek mythology

In Greek mythology, Syrus or Syros (Ancient Greek: Σύρων) may refer to a person or an animal:

- Syrus, son of Sinope (daughter of Asopus and Metope) and Apollo; the Syrians are named after him. In one account, Syros was the son of King Agenor of Tyre and Tyro, and brother to Cadmus, Phoenix, Cilix and Europa. When Agenor was about to die, he decreed that his kingdom will be divided among his three sons: Phoenix, Syros and Cilix. Syros named the country which was allotted to him Syria while his brothers received Phoenicia and Cilicia, respectively. Syros was said to be a wise man who wrote arithmetic philosophy in Phoenician letters.
- Syrus, one of the dogs of the hunter Actaeon.
