= Cercyon of Eleusis =

Mythical king at Eleusis

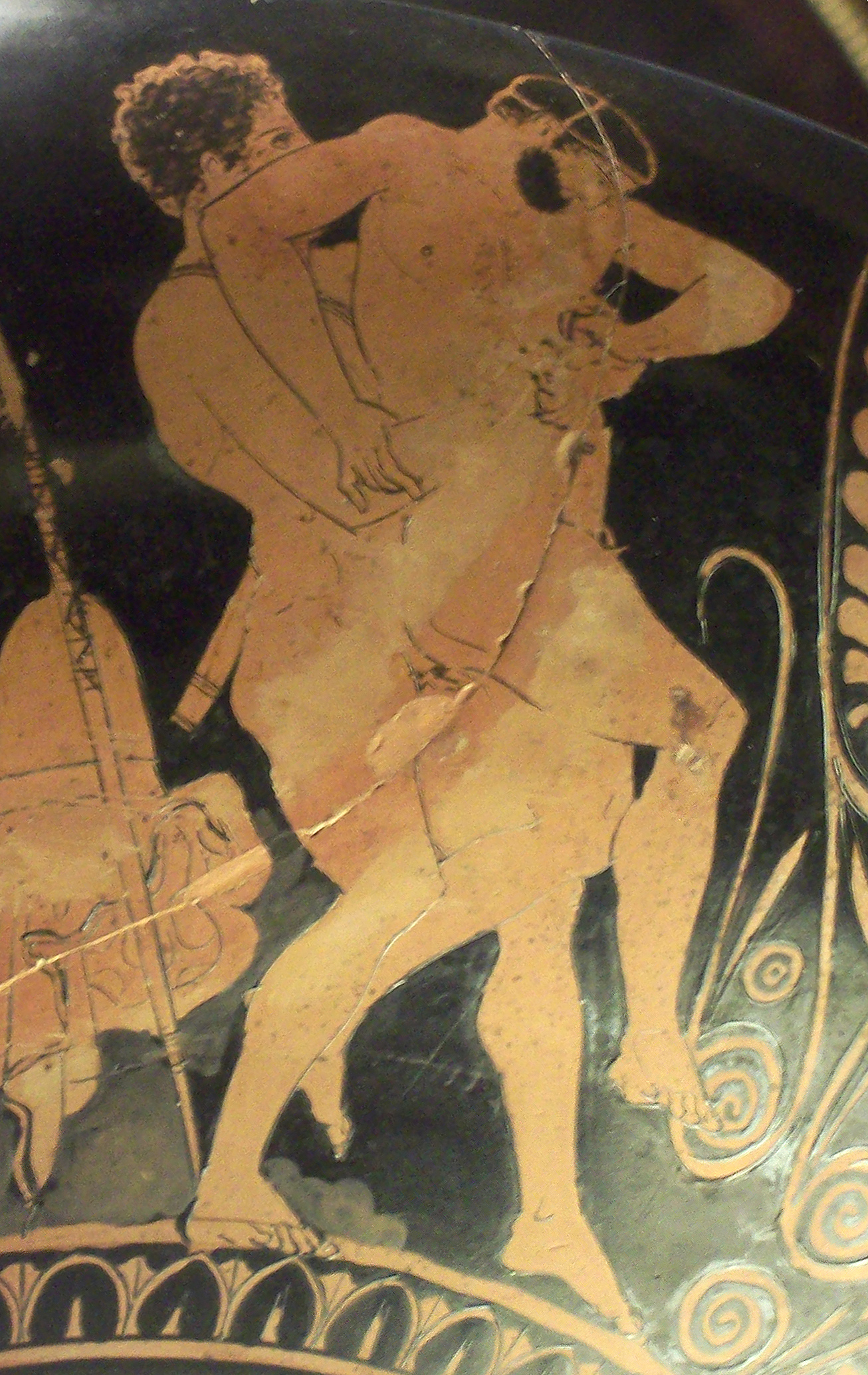
Theseus fights Cercyon (kylix painted by Aison, 5th century BC)

Cercyon (Ancient Greek: Κερκύων, romanized: Kerkúōn) is a figure in Greek mythology. He was a notorious king of Eleusis, famous for his cruelty towards his daughter, Alope, and anyone who refused to fight with him. Cercyon was described also as a very strong man.

== Family ==
According to the different versions, Cercyon was the son of: (1) Poseidon and one of the daughters of Amphictyon, and accordingly half-brother of Triptolemus or (2) Branchus and the nymph (or naiad) Argiope and finally of Hephaestus. He had one child, Alope but in the Suda, Cercyon was called the father of a certain Ekphantos, ancestor of the epic poet Musaeus (Cercyon-Ekphantos-Euphemus-Antiphemos-Musaeus).

== Mythology ==
=== Cruelty to a daughter ===
Cercyon's beautiful daughter, Alope, had an affair with (or was raped by) Poseidon. From this union, she begat a child which she gave to her nurse to be exposed, since she did not know its father. When the child was exposed, a mare came and furnished it milk. A certain shepherd, following the mare, saw the child and took it up. When he had taken it home, clothed in its royal garments, a fellow shepherd asked that it be given to him. The first gave it without the garments, and when strife rose between them, the one who had taken the child demanded signs it was free-born, but the other refused to give them, they came to King Cercyon and presented their arguments. The one who had taken the child again demanded the garments, and when they were brought, Cercyon knew that they were taken from the garments of his daughter. Alope's nurse, in fear, revealed to the king that the child was Alope's, and he ordered that his daughter be imprisoned and buried alive, and the child exposed. Again the mare fed it; shepherds again found the child, and took him up, and reared him. Feeling that he was being guarded by the will of the gods, they gave him the name Hippothous (Hippothoon). The body of Alope was then turned by Poseidon into a fountain, called by the name Alope, near Eleusis.

=== Death ===
Cercyon was said to have treated strangers wickedly, especially in wrestling with them against their will. He stood on the roads around Eleusis and challenged passers-by to a wrestling match. Other writers identified Cercyon as a robber who operated around Eleusis. The loser (always the passer-by) was murdered, though Cercyon promised his kingdom to anyone who won. In his fifth labour, journeying from Troezen, Theseus eventually beat and killed Cercyon when he lifted him up and dashed him to the ground. Theseus won owing to his skill, rather than superiority in brute physical strength. With this, Theseus started the sport of wrestling. In the account of Bacchylides, he alludes to the event when saying, "Theseus has closed the wrestling school of Cercyon". The place associated with the story, known as the wrestling-school of Cercyon, was near Eleusis, on the road to Megara.

According to some, Theseus ravished Cercyon's daughters after taking over the kingdom of Eleusis. He then gave it to Hippothous, who came to him and asked for his grandfather's kingdom. Theseus willingly gave it to him when he learned that he was the son of Poseidon, from whom he claimed his own birth.
