= Alope =

Ancient Greek mythological figure

- Ἀλόπη
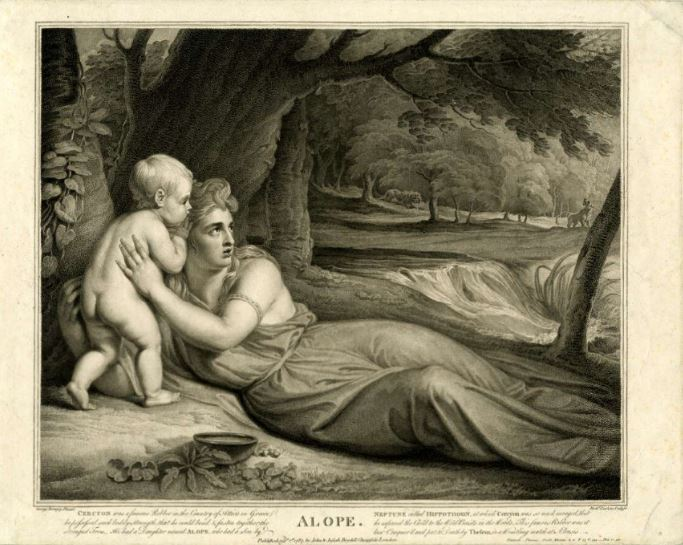
- Children: Hippothoon
- Father: Cercyon of Eleusis

Alope (/ˈæləˌpiː/; Ancient Greek: Ἀλόπη, romanized: Alópē) was in Greek mythology a mortal woman, the daughter of Cercyon, known for her great beauty.

== Mythology ==
Poseidon, in the guise of a kingfisher, seduced Alope, his granddaughter through Cercyon, and from the union she gave birth to Hippothoon. Alope left the infant in the open to die of exposure, but a passing mare suckled the child until it was found by shepherds, who fell into a dispute as to who was to have the beautiful royal attire of the boy. The case was brought before Cercyon, who, on recognizing by the dress whose child the boy was, ordered Alope to be imprisoned in order to be put to death, and her child to be exposed again. The latter was fed and found in the same manner as before, and the shepherds called him Hippothoon. The body of Alope was changed by Poseidon into a spring, which bore the same name.

The town of Alope, in ancient Thessaly, was believed to have derived its name from her, where, however, Philonides speaks of an Alope as a daughter of Actor. There was a monument of Alope on the road from Eleusis to Megara, on the spot where she was believed to have been killed by her father.
