= The Abduction of Europa (Rembrandt) =

1632 painting by Rembrandt

- Artist: Rembrandt
- Year: 1632
- Catalogue: 95.PB.7
- Medium: Oil on single oak panel
- Dimensions: 64.6 cm × 78.7 cm (25.4 in × 31.0 in)
- Location: J. Paul Getty Museum, California

Rembrandt Harmenszoon van Rijn's The Abduction of Europa (1632) is one of his rare mythological subject paintings. The work is oil on a single oak panel and now located in the J. Paul Getty Museum. The inspiration for the painting is Ovid's Metamorphoses, part of which tells the tale of Zeus's seduction and capture of Europa. The painting shows a coastal scene with Europa being carried away through the water by a bull while her friends remain on shore with expressions of horror. Rembrandt combined his knowledge of classical literature with the interests of the patron in order to create this allegorical work. The use of an ancient myth to impart a contemporary thought and his portrayal of the scene using the High Baroque style are two strong aspects of the work.

== Rembrandt and classical art ==
The Abduction of Europa is Rembrandt's reinterpretation of the story, placed in a more contemporary setting. Rembrandt developed an interest in the classical world early in his life while in Amsterdam which was a growing business-oriented center, and where he found work with great success. During this time, the international High Baroque style was popular. Rembrandt did not complete many mythological subject paintings. Out of three hundred sixty completed works, five displayed tales from the Metamorphoses, five depicted goddesses, and a Carthaginian queen, of which only five represented myth subjects. Rembrandt occasionally used these mythological paintings as allegory, applying the tale to some Christian theme or a moral tradition.

== Jacques Specx and Karel van Mander ==
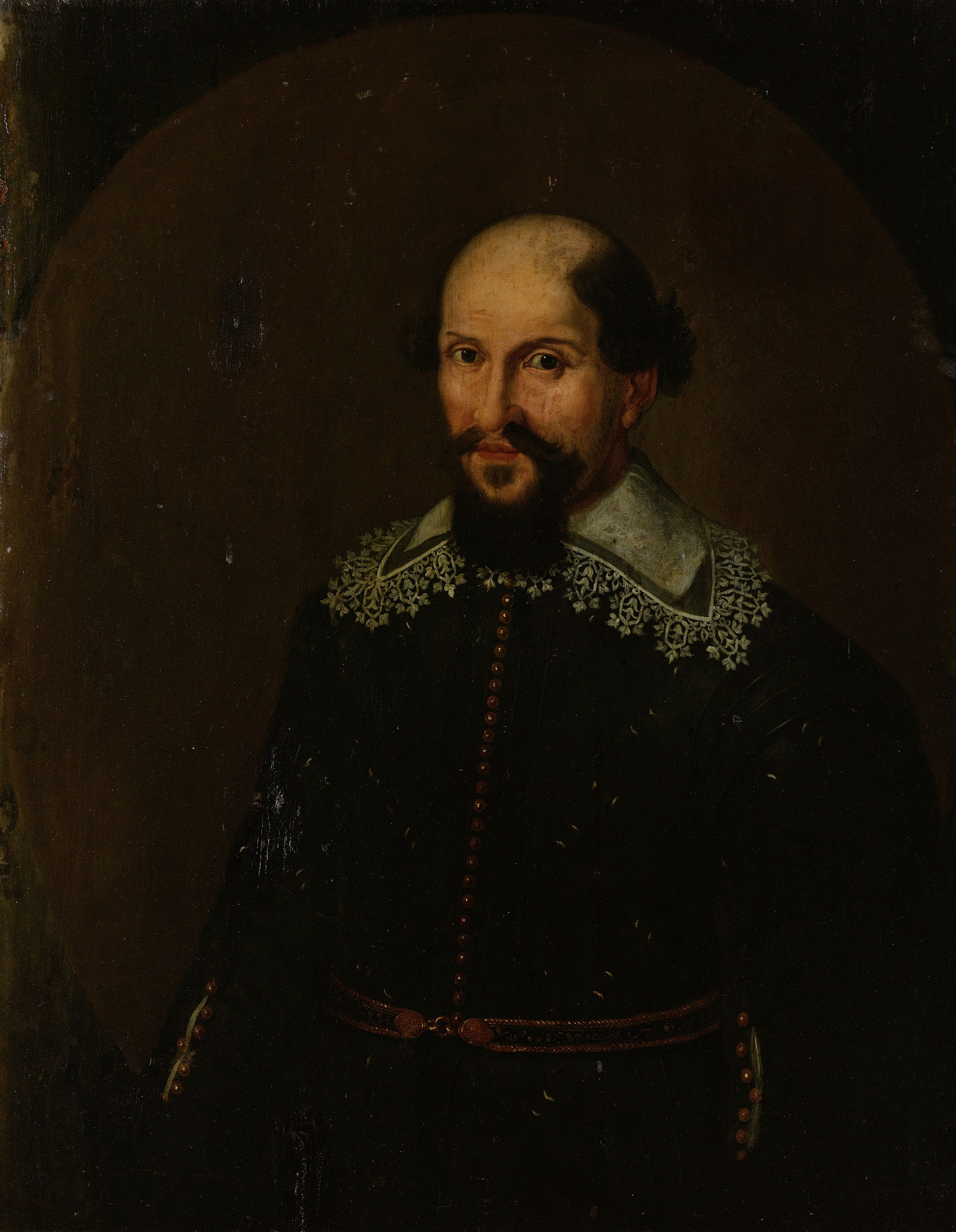
Jacques Specx in 1650

Jacques Specx, of the Dutch East India Company, commissioned Rembrandt to complete The Abduction of Europa. Specx had established a trading center in Japan in 1609, served as the governor of Batavia (former name of Jakarta, the Indonesian capital), and later returned to Holland in 1633. The painting was in Specx's collection, along with five portraits, also by Rembrandt.

The subject and its allegorical meaning are described by the Flemish art theorist, Karel van Mander, in Het schilder-boeck (1618). The book was produced in Amsterdam and included details about many Netherlands painters. Rembrandt surely would have familiarized himself with van Mander's theories and interpretations of Ovid's myths.

Van Mander commented on Europa's abduction, with a European spin to it.

Ovid's account of the abduction of Europa is found in Book II 833-75 of Metamorphoses. Europa is a princess of Tyre, who is playing with her court on the coast when a beautiful bull appears. Europa mounts the bull, which quickly whisks her away into the ocean. When Europa and her friends notice the bull retreating further into the sea without coming back, the bull transforms into Zeus and carries her to Mount Olympus. Rembrandt's painting is set just as Europa is whisked away, as seen by the bull and young lady in the ocean in the painting.

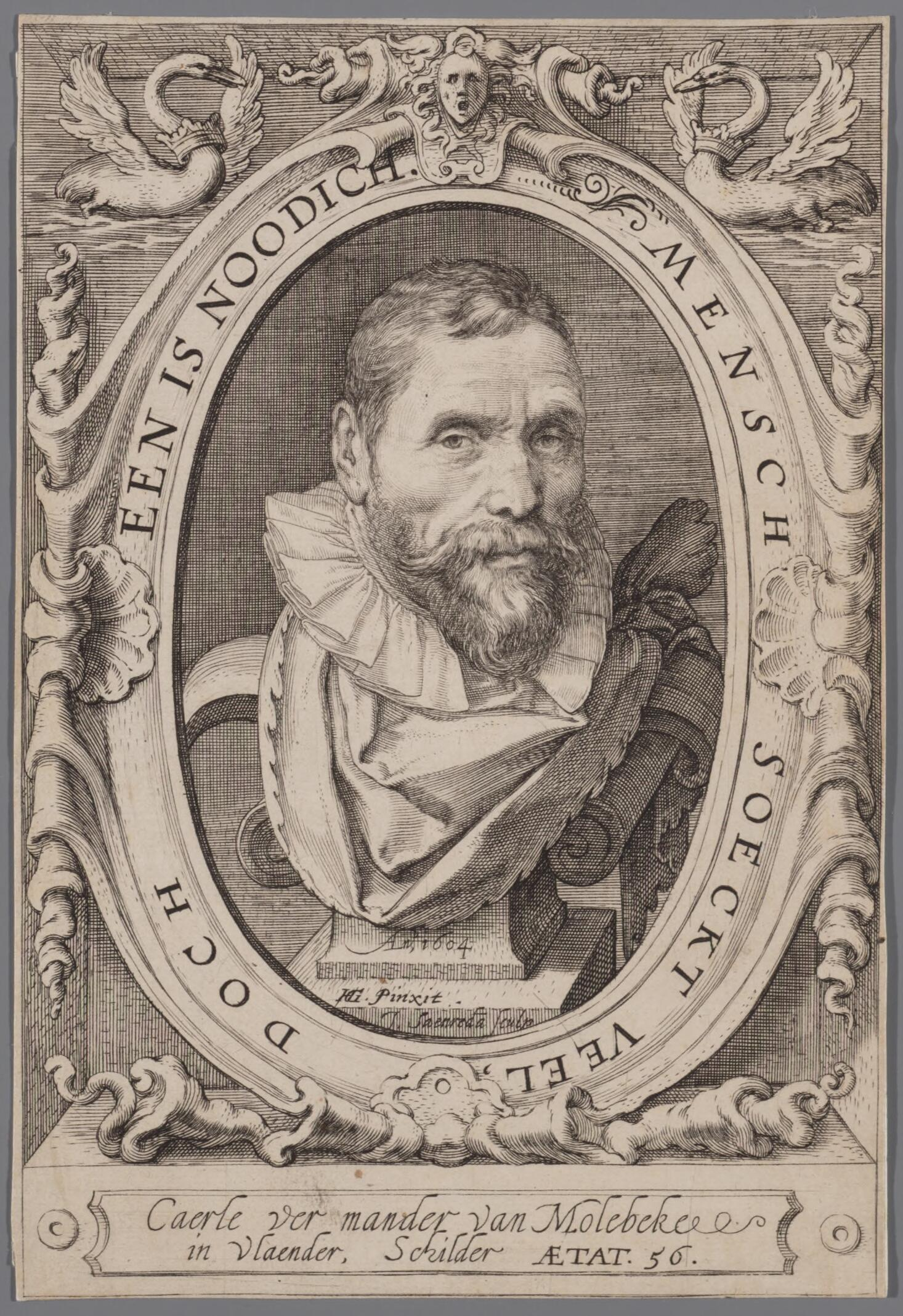
Karel van Mander, from Het schilder-boeck, 1604

Art historians, such as Mariët Westermann and Gary Schwartz interpret the painting as a reference to Specx' career. The painting includes details from Ovid's story that strengthen the location of the tale as well as tie it to Specx' life. The African driver and non-European coach in the shadows to the right allude to the exotic Phoenician coast. There is a port in the background, a reference to the busy port of the Tyre. Karel van Mander looked for an applicable meaning to the work that constructed a moral concept to the classical literature. He quoted an unnamed ancient source that stated that the abducted princess was representative of "the human soul, borne by the body through the troubled sea of this world". Van Mander theorized that the bull, which is Zeus in the classical tale, is really the name of a ship that bore Europa from her eastern home of Tyre to the western continent that adopts her name.

The literary comments of van Mander are essential to deconstructing the allegorical subject of Europa. In the story, Zeus whisks Europa away to Crete. In van Mander's interpretation, she is moved by ship to Crete. Just as Specx's career was to move treasures of Asia to Europe by ship, so too is Europa moved from her Eastern home to Europe. Rembrandt's familiarity with the literary and classical nature of the story is evident by the bull as both god and ship, and the harbor installation in the background. The harbor is representative of the busy trading ports in both Tyre and Europe. The portrayal of Tyre, though, seems fairly modern with the inclusion of a crane, a tool which did not exist in the first century when Ovid was alive. This detail strengthens the parallel between Tyre and the Dutch ports, as Rembrandt attempts to connect the story to Specx's livelihood. The relationship also alludes to Europa's impending new destination, where she will give Europe her name. Most scholars agree that this narrative was chosen specifically by Rembrandt to reinterpret and mirror Specx's career.

== Influence of the Baroque ==
Artistically, The Abduction of Europa reflects the attitudes and interests of Rembrandt and other Dutch painters during the early to mid seventeenth century. The work embodies the international High Baroque with dramatic lighting coming from the left and the high drama in the moment of abduction. This style was popular in Leiden, his birth town. The High Baroque was also present in the Ruben's work that Rembrandt studied. The idyllic shore and the detailed reflections in the water show the growing interest in naturalism in art. Naturalism plays a strong part in other aspects of the piece. Rembrandt contrasts the dark trees against the light blues and pinks skies. Rembrandt also uses light to further dramatize the piece, as seen by the glittering of gold on the dresses and carriages. The depiction of Europa on the bull combines these details: there is a clear reflection of the figures in the water, her dress has golden threads, and even her jewelry reflects some light. There was also a growing interest in historical landscape painting in Southern Netherlands. Artistic interests like genre, landscape, and myth painting, all combine in this one work.

== Titian's influence ==
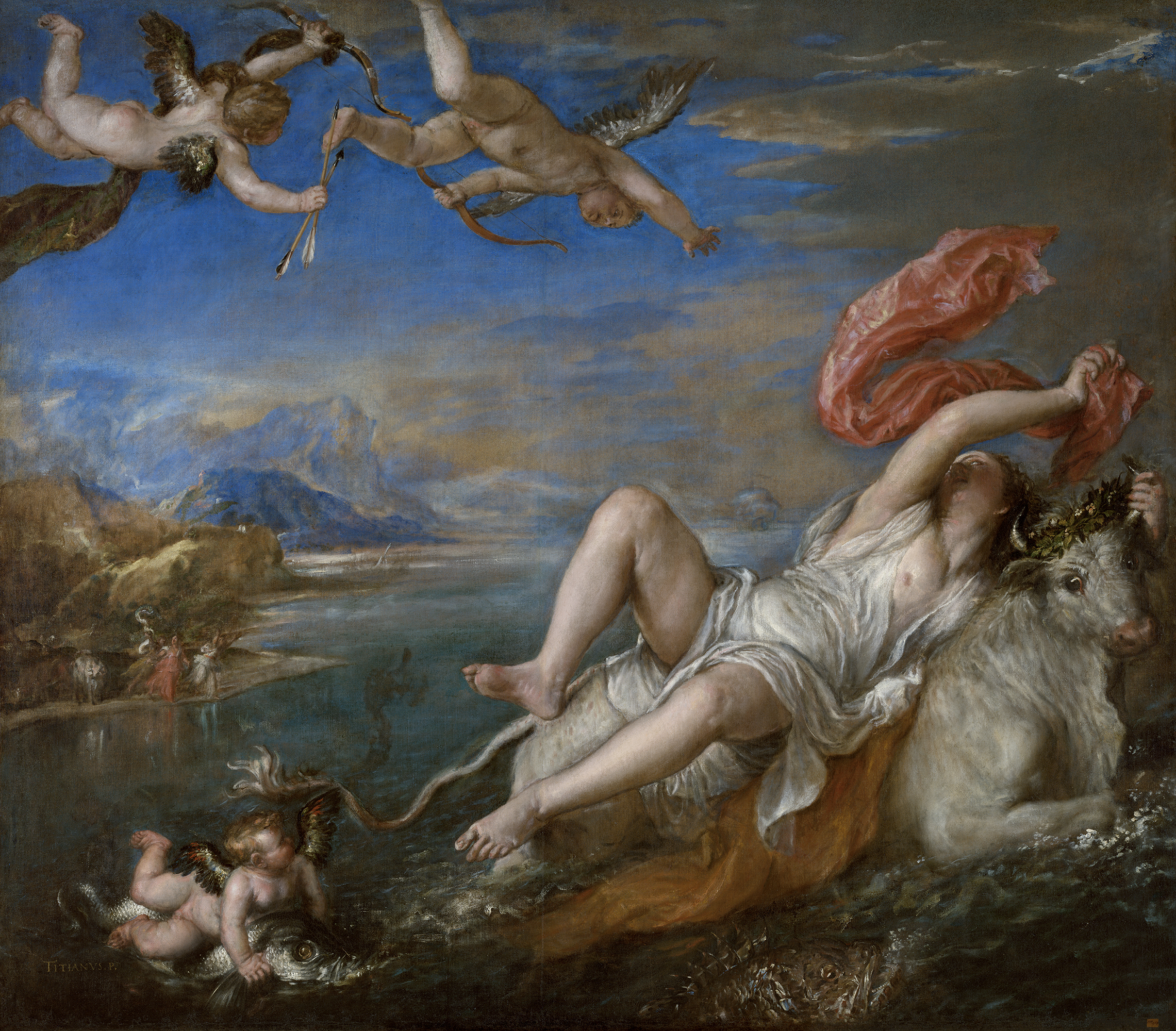
The Rape of Europa, Titian 1560–1562

Rembrandt was not the first artist to represent the abduction of Europa by Zeus. The Italian artist, Titian, created a similar work nearly seventy years before. Many art historians agree that Titian was a huge influence on Rembrandt, including Westermann who connects the two artists in their comparison works of Danaë. Rembrandt is often called the "Titian of the north", and many of his portrait pieces show the influence of the Titian style and technique. Though Rembrandt never traveled to Italy, Venetian paintings that traveling to Amsterdam increased as it grew as an art center. Amy Golahny, in a dissertation, justifies this thought. She writes, "When the Secretary to the Staudthouder asked the two young painters [Rembrandt and Jan Lievens] why they did not undertake the journey to Italy to study the great monuments there, and especially the works of Raphael and Michelangelo, they replied that there was an abundance of Italian art already to be viewed in Holland." The presence of Italian art must have been strong, for Rembrandt kept a portrait of Titians' Money-changers in his studio. A sure connection and influence, then, would be Titian's representation of the same Ovidian story.

While the influences of Titian's Europa (1560–1562) are recognizable, Rembrandt's work is unique. Both pieces reflects the heightened drama of the piece, but Titian's work is more violent in nature. Philip II of Spain commissioned the piece, and Titian uses the psychological depiction of Europa's horror and nudity to reflect the sexual violence of the moment. Rembrandt's work is less serious a depiction of the violence, but still keeps the climactic moment alive. Titian keeps the figures in ancient dress, himations and chitons, keeping strong the mythological nature of the work. Rembrandt places his figures in contemporary Dutch dress, making the story more relatable to his viewer. Rembrandt's work is set in a realistic setting, removing the cherubs from the work, instead placing the story in a highly familiar nature setting for his Dutch audience, Specx. Rembrandt makes these changes not only to set himself apart from Titian, but also to gear the work specifically in mind to the commissioner of the work.

== Lasting tradition ==
Rembrandt's The Abduction of Europa displays much about the artistic influences of his time. His work is mindful of the patron, painted in the popular High Baroque style, and incorporates the influences of earlier artists like Titian. This piece is only one of the mythological subject he completed, but Rembrandt's other works display many of the same influences as this one.

== See also ==
- List of paintings by Rembrandt
