= Damno (mythology) =

In Greek mythology, Damno (/ˈdæm.noʊ/; Ancient Greek: Δαμνὼ) may refer to two possible women:

- Damno, an Egyptian princess as the daughter of King Belus of Egypt. She married her paternal uncle, Agenor, and by him, became the mother of Isaia and Melia. Later on, these two women married their cousins, Aegyptus and Danaus (brothers of Damno), respectively. In other accounts, the wife of Agenor was variously given as Telephassa, Argiope, Antiope, or Tyro.
- Damno, possibly the accurate name of Damone, one of the Danaides as daughter of Danaus. She married her paternal cousin Amyntor, son of Aegyptus, whom she eventually killed on their wedding night following the instructions of her father.
