= Hippothoon =

Greek mythological prince

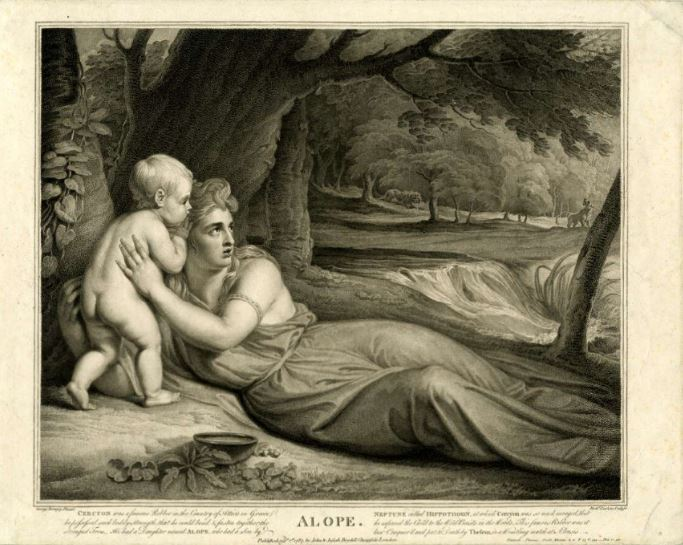
Hippothoon and his mother Alope on a 1787 engraving.

Hippothoon (/hɪˈpɒθoʊ.ən/; Ancient Greek: Ἱπποθόων, romanized: Hippothóōn) or Hippothous is a figure in Greek mythology, often described as the king of Eleusis, succeeding to the throne after the death of Cercyon. He is the Attic hero and the eponym of the Athenian phyle called Hippothoontis (Ιπποθοωντίς).

== Family ==
Hippothoon was the son of Poseidon and Alope, Cercyon's daughter.

== Mythology ==
Although Cercyon had Alope buried alive, Poseidon turned her into the spring, Alope, near Eleusis. Hippothoon was stated to be present in the missions of Triptolemus and was mentioned along with Eumolpus as an Eleusinian hero who was worshiped according to honorary decrees dating to the 4th century BC. He was also described as the host of Demeter, instead of Celeus, during her wandering in search of Persephone.

According to Pausanias, a heroon was dedicated to him for worship by hereditarily assigned priests.
