= Argiope (mythology) =

Greek mythological characters

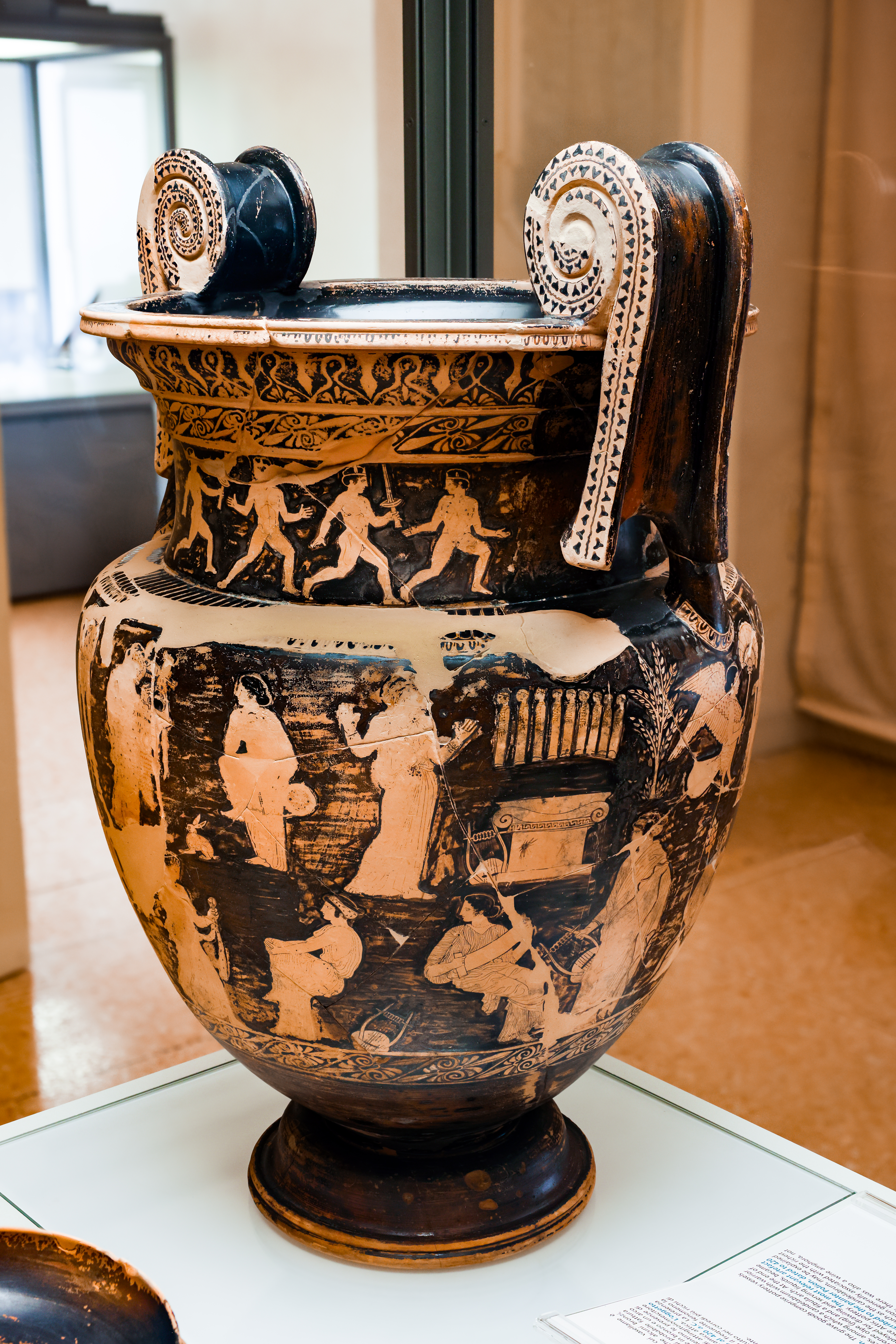
Argiope (mother of Thamyris) on an Attic red-figure volute krater from circa 420s BC, National Archaeological Museum of Ferrara.

In Greek mythology, Argiope (/ˈɑːr.ɡaɪ.ə.piː/ or /ˈɑːr.dʒɪ.oʊp/; Ancient Greek: Ἀργιόπη, romanized: Argiópē) may refer to:

- Argiope, naiad daughter of the river god Nile. She was wife of King Agenor of Tyre and mother of Europa, Cadmus, Phoenix and Cilix. More commonly known as Telephassa. Otherwise, the spouse of Agenor was variously given as Antiope, Damno and Tyro.
- Argiope, naiad, possibly the daughter of the river-god Cephissus, mother of Thamyris by Philammon. She lived at first on Mount Parnassus but when Philammon refused to take her into his house as his wife, she left Parnassus and went to the country of the Odrysians in Thrace when pregnant.
- Argiope, naiad of the town of Eleusis, mother of Cercyon by Branchus. Possibly same as the above Argiope thus, a daughter of the river-god Cephissus.
- Argiope, daughter of Teuthras, king of Teuthrania, a region near Mysia in Asia Minor. She married Telephus, son of Heracles.

Not to be confused with Agriope (Ἀγριόπη, Agriópē):

- Agriope, another name for Eurydice, wife of Orpheus whom the hero unsuccessfully tried to bring back from Hades.
