= The Rape of Europa (Jordaens) =

1643 painting by Jacob Jordaens

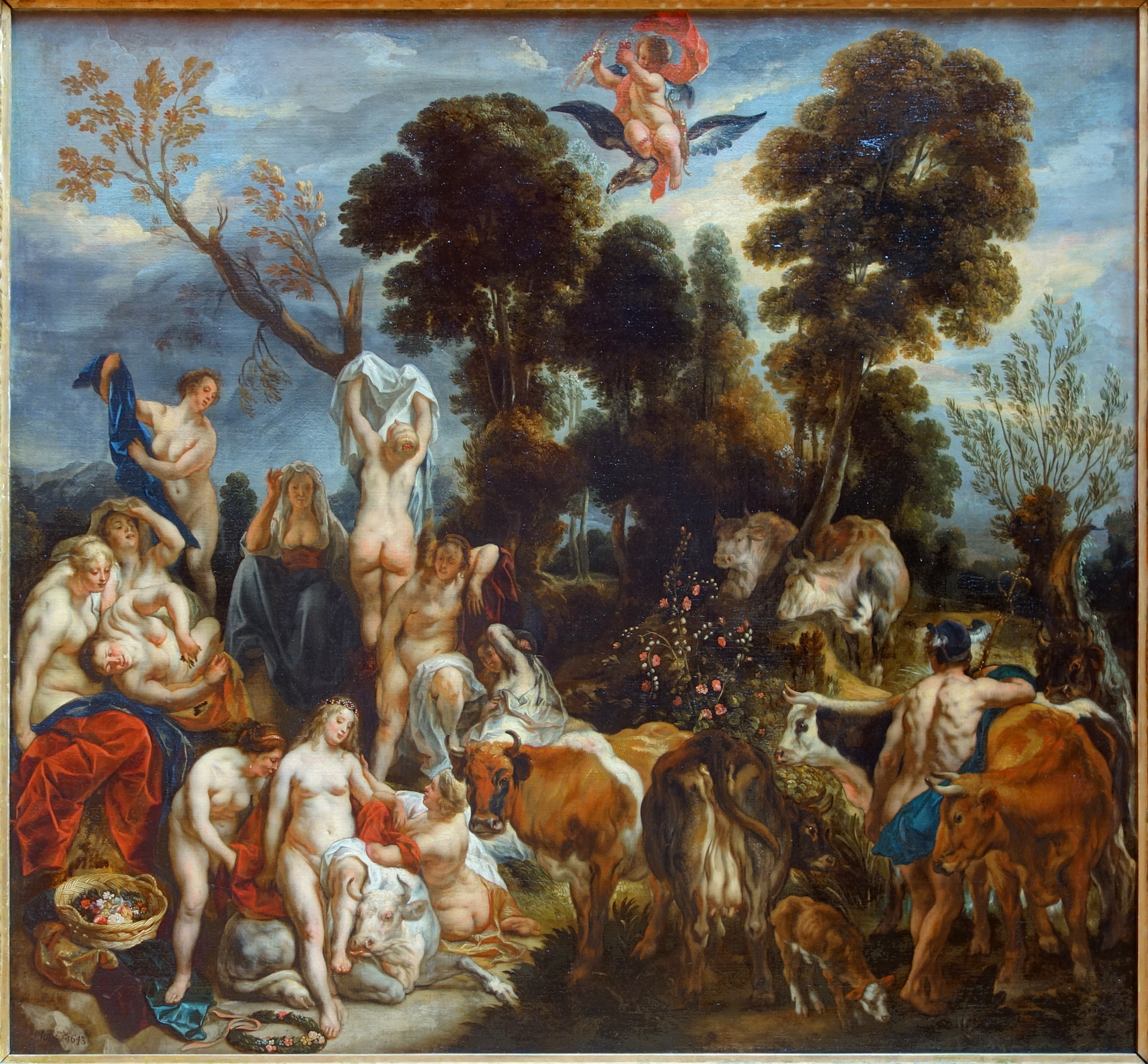
The Rape of Europa (1643) by Jacob Jordaens

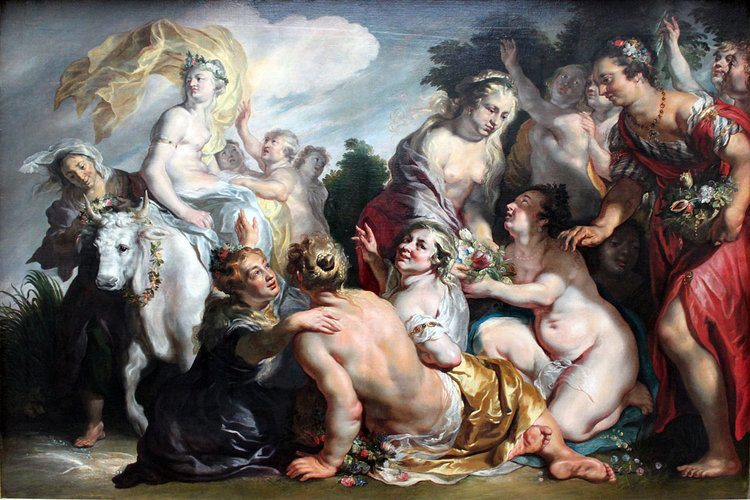
Rape of Europa, 1615 version

The Rape of Europa is a 1643 painting by the Flemish painter Jacob Jordaens (1593–1678), now in the palais des Beaux-Arts de Lille. He also produced a more erotic earlier (1615–1616) version, now in the Gemäldegalerie, Berlin.
