= Europa (consort of Zeus) =

Greek mythology character, daughter of Agenor

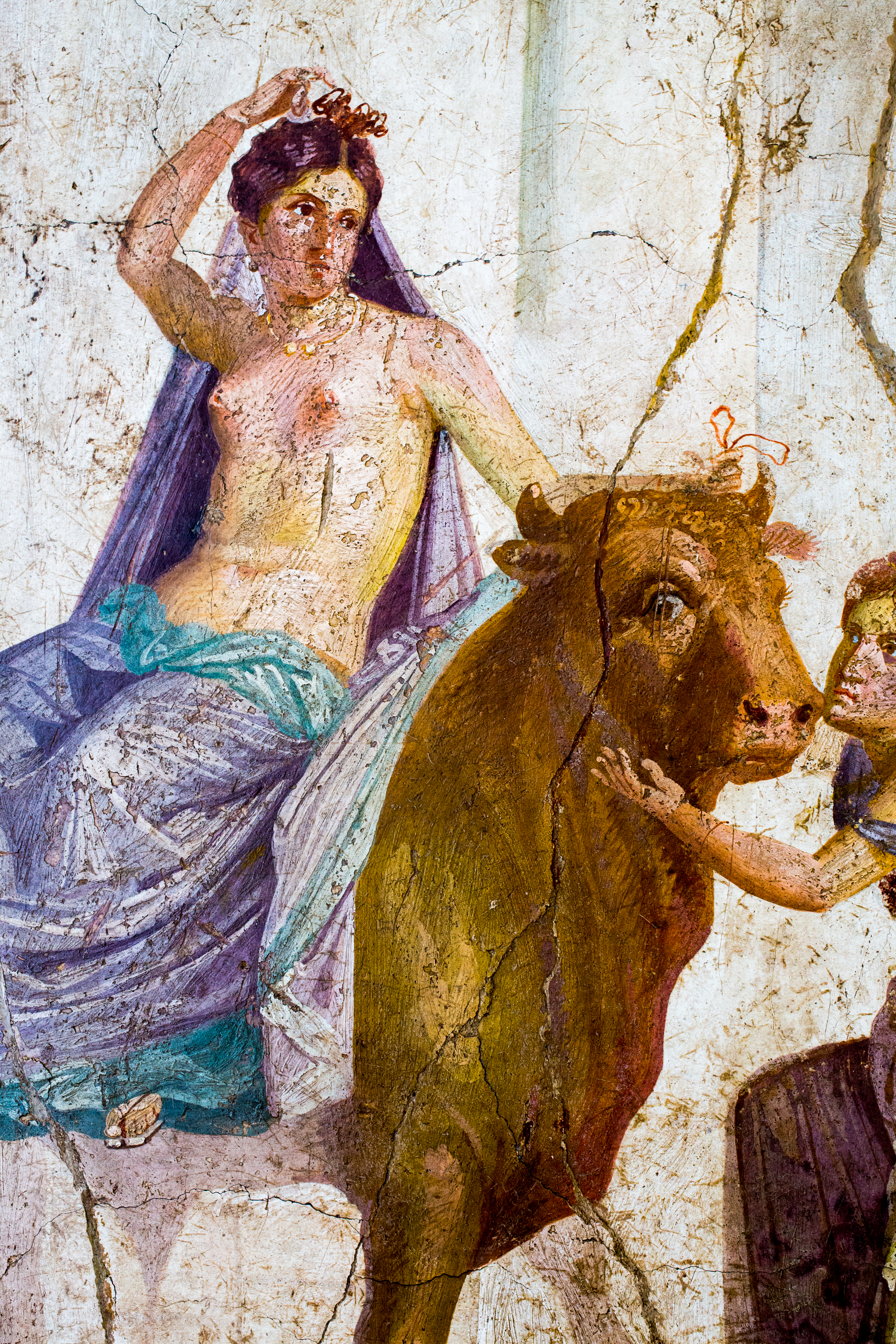
- Europa on the back of Zeus, who has turned into a bull, in a 1st-century BC fresco from Pompeii
- Abode: Crete

Genealogy
- Parents: Agenor with either Telephassa or Argiope; alternatively Phoenix and Perimede
- Siblings: Cadmus, Cilix, Phoenix
- Consort: Asterion, Zeus
- Children: Minos, Rhadamanthys, Sarpedon, Crete, Alagonia, Carnus

In Greek mythology, Europa (/jʊəˈroʊpə, jə-/; Ancient Greek: Εὐρώπη, romanized: Eurṓpē; Attic Greek pronunciation: [eu̯.rɔ̌ː.pɛː]) was a Phoenician princess said to have been abducted by Zeus in the form of a bull. She was the mother of the Cretan king Minos.

An early reference to Europa is in a fragment of the Hesiodic Catalogue of Women, discovered at Oxyrhynchus. The earliest vase-painting securely identifiable as Europa dates from the mid-7th century BC. The continent Europe may derive its name from her.

== Etymology ==
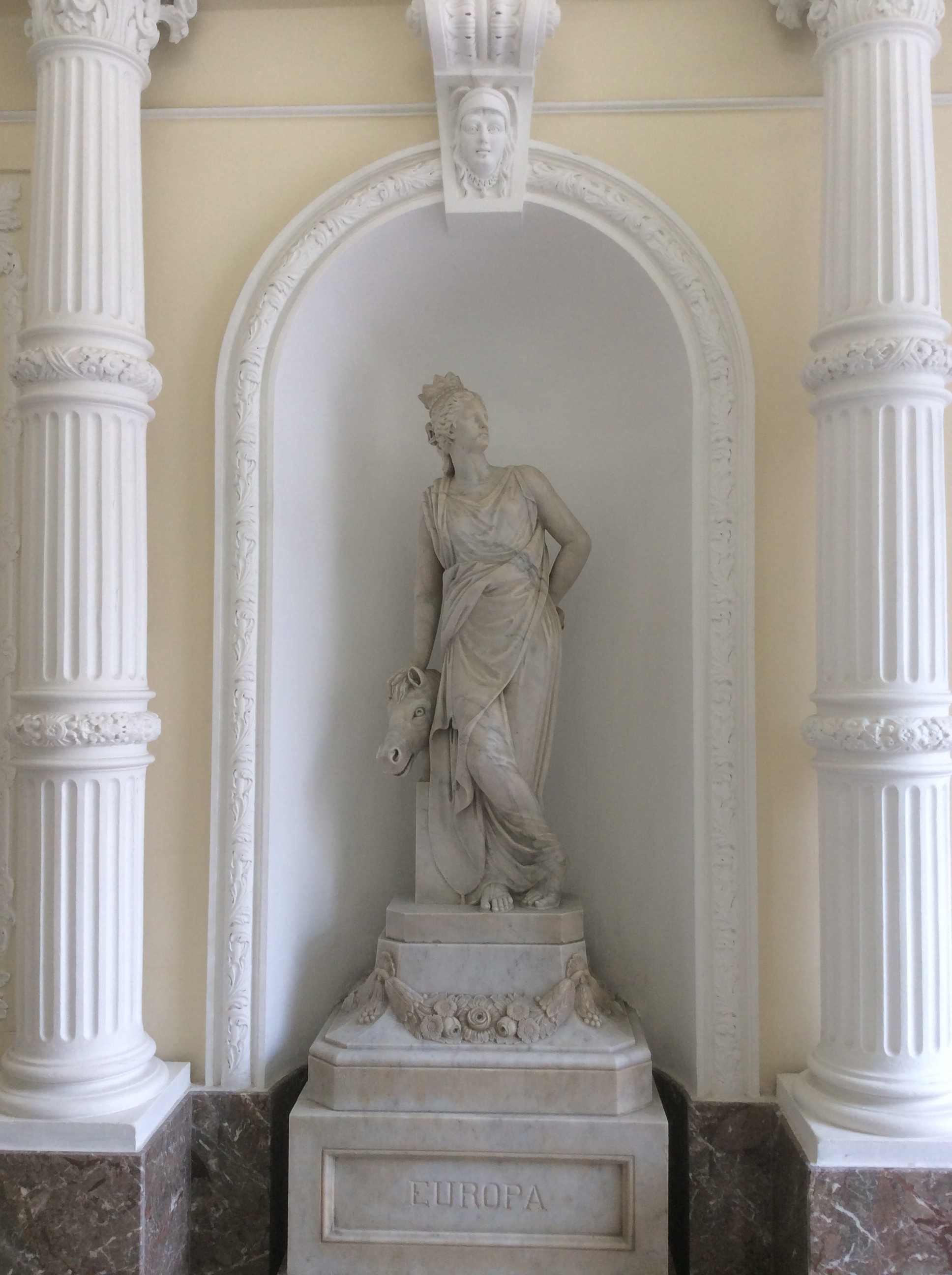
A statue of Europa representing Europe at Palazzo Ferreria

Greek Εὐρώπη (Eurṓpē) may have been formed from εὐρύς (eurus), "wide, broad" and ὤψ/ὠπ-/ὀπτ- (ōps/ōp-/opt-): "eye, face, countenance". Broad has been an epithet of Earth herself in the reconstructed Proto-Indo-European religion.

It is common in ancient Greek mythology and geography to identify lands or rivers with female figures. Thus, Europa is first used in a geographic context in the Homeric Hymn to Delian Apollo, in reference to the western shore of the Aegean Sea. As a name for a part of the known world, it is first used in the 6th century BC by Anaximander and Hecataeus. Toponyms related to that of Europa exist in the territory of ancient Greece, such as that of Europos in ancient Macedonia, as collected by Robert Beekes.

In 1966, an alternative suggestion from Ernest Klein and Giovanni Semerano attempted to connect a Semitic term for "west", Akkadian erebu meaning "to go down, set" (in reference to the sun), Phoenician 'ereb "evening; west", which would parallel occident. The resemblance to Erebus, from PIE *h_{1}regʷos, "darkness", is accidental. In 1999, M. A. Barry adduced the word Ereb on an Assyrian stele with the meaning of "night", "[the country of] sunset", in opposition to Asu, "[the country of] sunrise", i.e. Asia, Anatolia coming equally from Ἀνατολή, "(sun)rise", "east". This proposal is mostly considered unlikely or untenable. (Note: Martin Litchfield West states that "phonologically, the match between Europa's name and any form of the Semitic word is very poor". M. L. West (1997). The east face of Helicon: west Asiatic elements in Greek poetry and myth. Oxford: Clarendon Press. p. 451. ISBN 0-19-815221-3..)

== Family ==
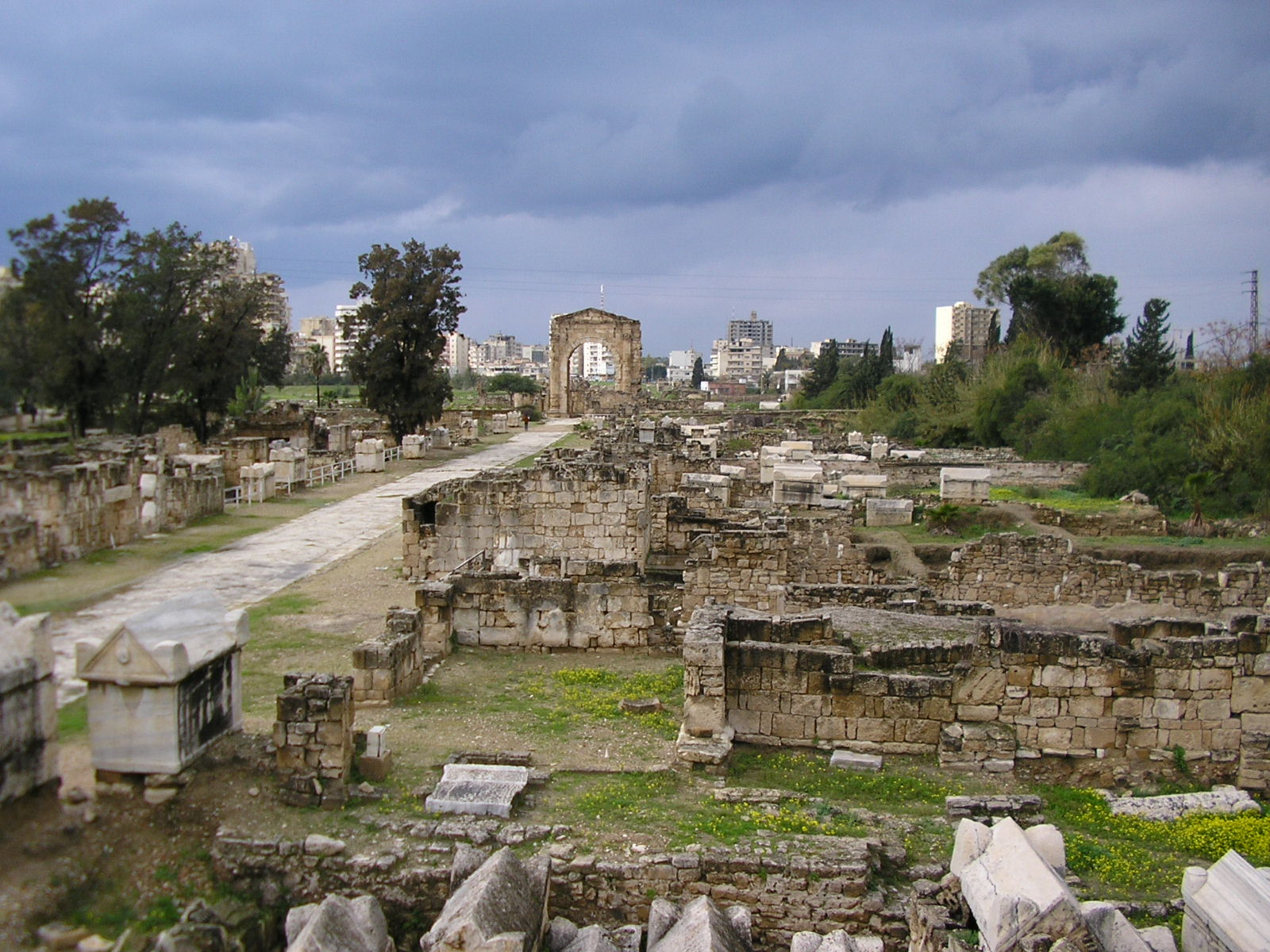
The birthplace of Europa, Tyre, Lebanon

Sources differ in details regarding Europa's family, but agree that she is Phoenician, and from an Argive lineage that ultimately descended from the princess Io, the mythical nymph beloved of Zeus, who was transformed into a heifer. She is generally said to be the daughter of Agenor, the Phoenician King of Tyre. The Syracusan poet Moschus makes her mother Queen Telephassa ("far-shining"). Elsewhere, her mother is Argiope ("silver-faced"). (Note: Kerenyi points out that these names are attributes of the moon, as is Europa's broad countenance.)

Other sources, such as the Iliad, claim that she is the daughter of Agenor's son, the "sun-red" Phoenix. It is generally agreed that she had two brothers, Cadmus, who brought the alphabet to mainland Greece, and Cilix who gave his name to Cilicia in Asia Minor. The author of Bibliotheke includes Phoenix as a third brother. So some interpret this as her brother Phoenix (when he is assumed to be son of Agenor) gave his siblings' name to his three children and this Europa (by this case, niece of former) is also loved by Zeus, but because of the same name, gave some confusions to others.

After arriving in Crete, Europa had three sons fathered by Zeus: Minos, Rhadamanthus, and Sarpedon. Minos and Rhadamanthus became judges of the Underworld, alongside Aeacus of Aegina, when they died. In Crete she married Asterion, also rendered Asterius, and became mother, or step-mother, of his daughter Crete. Pausanias wrote that the poet Praxilla makes Carnus a son of Europa.

Comparative table of Europa's family
| Relation | Names | Sources | | | | | | | | | | | | | | |
|---|---|---|---|---|---|---|---|---|---|---|---|---|---|---|---|---|
| Relation | Names | Alcman | Hom. | Sch. Iliad | Hes. | Hella. | Bacchy. | Sch. Eurip | Mosc | Con | Diod. | Apollod. | | Hyg. | Pau. | Non. |
| Parentage | Phoenix | | ✓ (Note: Though Europa was unnamed in this text, she must be the daughter of Phoenix who coupled with Zeus.) | ✓ | | ✓ | ✓ | | | ✓ | | | ✓ | | | |
| Parentage | Phoenix and Cassiopeia | | | | ✓ | | | | | | | | | | | |
| Parentage | Phoenix and Telephassa | | | | | | | | ✓ | | | | | | | |
| Parentage | Phoenix and Telephe | | | | | | | ✓ | | | | | | | | |
| Parentage | Phoenix and Perimede | | | | | | | | | | | | | | ✓ | |
| Parentage | Agenor | | | | | | | | | | ✓ | | | | | |
| Parentage | Agenor and Telephassa | | | | | | | | | | | ✓ | | | | |
| Parentage | Agenor and Argiope | | | | | | | | | | | | | ✓ | | ✓ |
| Siblings | Phineus | | | | ✓ | | | | | | | ✓ (Note: Even though Phineus was called the son of Agenor according to Apollodorus, his mother may be different because only three sons (Cadmus, Phoenix and Cilix) were born to Agenor and Telephassa.) | | ✓ | | |
| Siblings | Astypale | | | | | | | ✓ | | | | | | | ✓ | |
| Siblings | Phoenice | | | | | | | ✓ | | | | | | | | |
| Siblings | Peirus | | | | | | | ✓ | | | | | | | | |
| Siblings | Cadmus | | | ✓ | | ✓ | | | | ✓ | ✓ | ✓ | | ✓ | | ✓ |
| Siblings | Thasus | | | | | | | | | ✓ | | | | | | |
| Siblings | Phoenix | | | | | | | | | | | ✓ | | | | |
| Siblings | Cilix | | | | | | | | | | | ✓ | | | | |
| Siblings | Adonis | | | | | | | | | | | | ✓ | | | |
| Consorts | Zeus | ✓ | ✓ | | | | | | | | | ✓ | | | | |
| Consorts | Asterius | | | | | | | | | | | | ✓ | | | |
| Children | Minos | | ✓ | | | | ✓ (Note: Unnamed but pertains to Minos who was king of Crete) | | | ✓ | | ✓ | | | | |
| Children | Rhadamanthys | | ✓ | | | | | | | | | ✓ | | | | |
| Children | Sarpedon | | | | | | | | | | | ✓ | | | | |
| Children | Carnus | ✓ | | | | | | | | | | | | | | |

== Mythology ==
The Abduction of Europa by Rembrandt, 1632

The Dictionary of Classical Mythology explains that Zeus was enamoured with Europa and decided to seduce or rape her, the two being near-equivalent in Greek myth. He transformed himself into a tame white bull and mixed in with her father's herds. While Europa and her helpers were gathering flowers, she saw the bull, caressed his flanks, and eventually got onto his back. Zeus took that opportunity and ran to the sea and swam, with her on his back, to the island of Crete.

Zeus then revealed his true identity, and Europa became the first queen of Crete. Zeus gave her a necklace made by Hephaestus and three additional gifts: the bronze automaton guard Talos, the hound Laelaps who never failed to catch his quarry, and a javelin that never missed. Zeus later re-created the shape of the white bull in the stars, which is now known as the constellation Taurus. It should not be confused with the Cretan Bull that fathered the Minotaur and was captured by Heracles. Roman mythology adopted the tale of the Raptus, also known as "The Abduction of Europa" and "The Seduction of Europa", substituting the god Jupiter for Zeus.

The myth of Europa and Zeus may have its origin in a sacred union between the Phoenician deities 'Aštar and 'Aštart (Astarte), in bovine form. Having given birth to three sons by Zeus, Europa married a king Asterion, this being also the name of the Minotaur and an epithet of Zeus, likely derived from the name 'Aštar.

According to Herodotus's rationalizing approach, Europa was kidnapped by Greeks, probably Cretans, who were seeking to avenge the kidnapping of Io, a princess from Argos. His variant story may have been an attempt to rationalize the earlier myth. Or, the present myth may be a garbled version of facts—the abduction of a Phoenician aristocrat—later enunciated without gloss by Herodotus. Palaephatus's rationalization similarly had it that a Cretan named Tauros was waging war around Tyre and carried off many girls, including Europa. Palaephatus also rationalized the Minotaur as simply a man whose father was named Tauros, thus using the same explanation twice.

In his commentary on Lycophron's Alexandra, John Tzetzes presents several different accounts of the story of Europa:

Europa is said to have been taken from Phoenicia to Crete on a "bull-shaped" ship, with the Cretans described as seizing her in this manner. Another tradition holds that a Cretan general named Taurus ("Bull"), sent by Asterius (also called Minos), king of Crete, abducted her. In some traditions, Asterius is identified with Minos and is described as having a bull-like appearance.

Lycophron also refers to Europa as "Saraptian" (Σαραπτίαν) and Tzetzes explains that this epithet derives from the Phoenician city of Saraptia (Σαραπτία), also known as Sareptia (Σαρεπτία), located between Sidon and Tyre.

== Cult ==
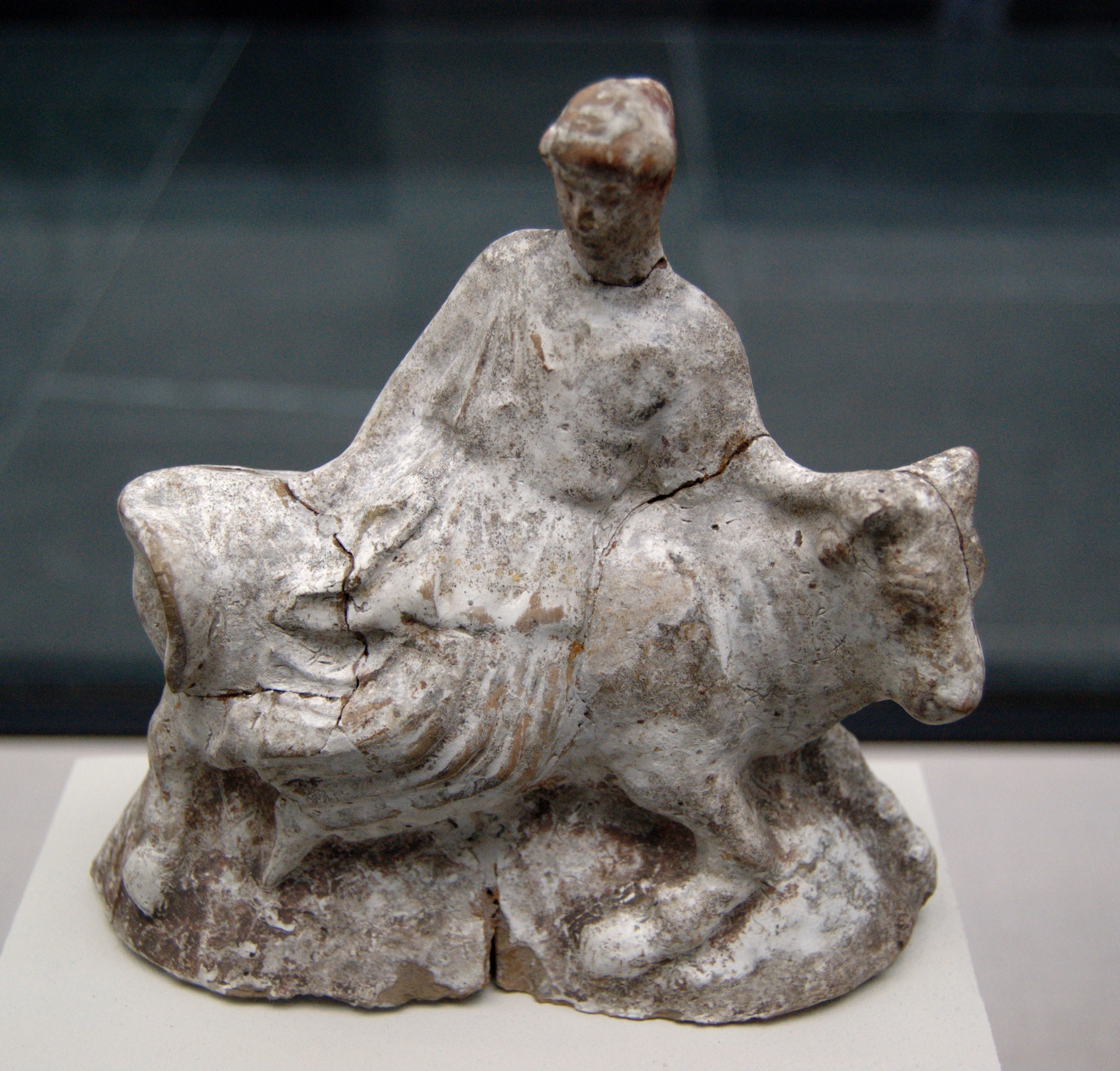
Europa in a terracotta figurine from Athens, c. 460–480 BC

=== Astarte and Europa ===
In the territory of Phoenician Sidon, Lucian of Samosata (2nd century AD) was informed that the temple of Astarte, whom Lucian equated with the moon goddess, was sacred to Europa:

There is likewise in Phœnicia a temple of great size owned by the Sidonians. They call it the temple of Astarte. I hold this Astarte to be no other than the moon-goddess. But according to the story of one of the priests this temple is sacred to Europa, the sister of Cadmus. She was the daughter of Agenor, and on her disappearance from Earth the Phœnicians honoured her with a temple and told a sacred legend about her; how that Zeus was enamoured of her for her beauty, and changing his form into that of a bull carried her off into Crete. This legend I heard from other Phœnicians as well; and the coinage current among the Sidonians bears upon it the effigy of Europa sitting upon a bull, none other than Zeus. Thus they do not agree that the temple in question is sacred to Europa.

The paradox, as it seemed to Lucian, would be solved if Europa is Astarte in her guise as the full, "broad-faced" moon.

=== Interpretation ===
There were two competing myths relating how Europa came into the Hellenic world, but they agreed that she came to Crete (Kríti), where the sacred bull was paramount. In the more familiar telling she was seduced by the god Zeus in the form of a bull, who breathed from his mouth a saffron crocus and carried her away to Crete on his back—to be welcomed by Asterion. (Note: According to the scholium on Iliad XII.292, noted in Karl Kerenyi (1996) Dionysus: Archetypal Image of Indestructible Life p. 105. ISBN 0691029156. Pausanias rendered the name Asterion (2.31.1); in Bibliotheke (3.1.4) it is Asterion.) According to the more literal, euhemerist version that begins the account of Persian–Hellene confrontations of Herodotus, (Note: Herodotus, Histories I.1; the act is made out to be a revenge for the previous "kidnapping" of Io.) she was kidnapped by Cretans, who likewise were said to have taken her to Crete.

The mythical Europa cannot be separated from the mythology of the sacred bull, which had been worshipped in the Levant. In 2012, an archaeological mission of the British Museum led by Lebanese archaeologist, Claude Doumet-Serhal, discovered at the site of the old American school in Sidon, Lebanon, currency that depicts Europa riding the bull with her veil flying all over like a bow, further proof of Europa's Phoenician origin.

Europa does not seem to have been venerated directly in cult anywhere in classical Greece, (Note: No public statue of Europa is mentioned by Pausanias or any other Classical writer, but a headless statuette, closely draped in a cloak over a peplos, of the type called "Amelung's Goddess", but inscribed "Europa", at the Metropolitan Museum of Art, seems to be a Roman copy of a lost Greek original, of c. 460 BC; an uninscribed statuette of the same type, from Hama, Syria, is in the Damascus Museum, and a full-size copy has been found in Baiae: Martin Robertson (1957). "Europa". Journal of the Warburg and Courtauld Institutes. 20 (1/2). JSTOR: 1. doi:10.2307/750147. JSTOR i230424. S2CID 244492052.; I. E. S. Edwards, ed. The Cambridge Ancient History, plates to vols. V and VI 1970:illus. fig. 24.) but at Lebadaea in Boeotia, Pausanias noted in the 2nd century AD, that Europa was the epithet of Demeter—"Demeter whom they surname Europa and say was the nurse of Trophonios"—among the Olympians who were addressed by seekers at the cave sanctuary of Trophonios of Orchomenus, to whom a chthonic cult and oracle were dedicated: "the grove of Trophonios by the river Herkyna ... there is also a sanctuary of Demeter Europa ... the nurse of Trophonios.

The festival of Hellotia in Crete was celebrated in honour of Europa.

== Argive genealogy ==
Argive genealogy in Greek mythology

Oceanus | Tethys
Inachus | Melia
Zeus | Io | Phoroneus
Epaphus | Memphis
Libya | Poseidon
Achiroë | Belus | Agenor | Telephassa
Danaus | Elephantis | Aegyptus | Cadmus | Cilix | Europa | Phoenix
Mantineus | Hypermnestra | Lynceus | Harmonia | Zeus
Sparta | Lacedaemon | Ocalea | Abas | Polydorus | Agave | Sarpedon | Rhadamanthus
Eurydice | Acrisius | Autonoë | Ino | Minos
Zeus | Danaë | Semele | Zeus
Perseus | Dionysus

Colour key:

Male
Female
Deity

== In art and literature ==
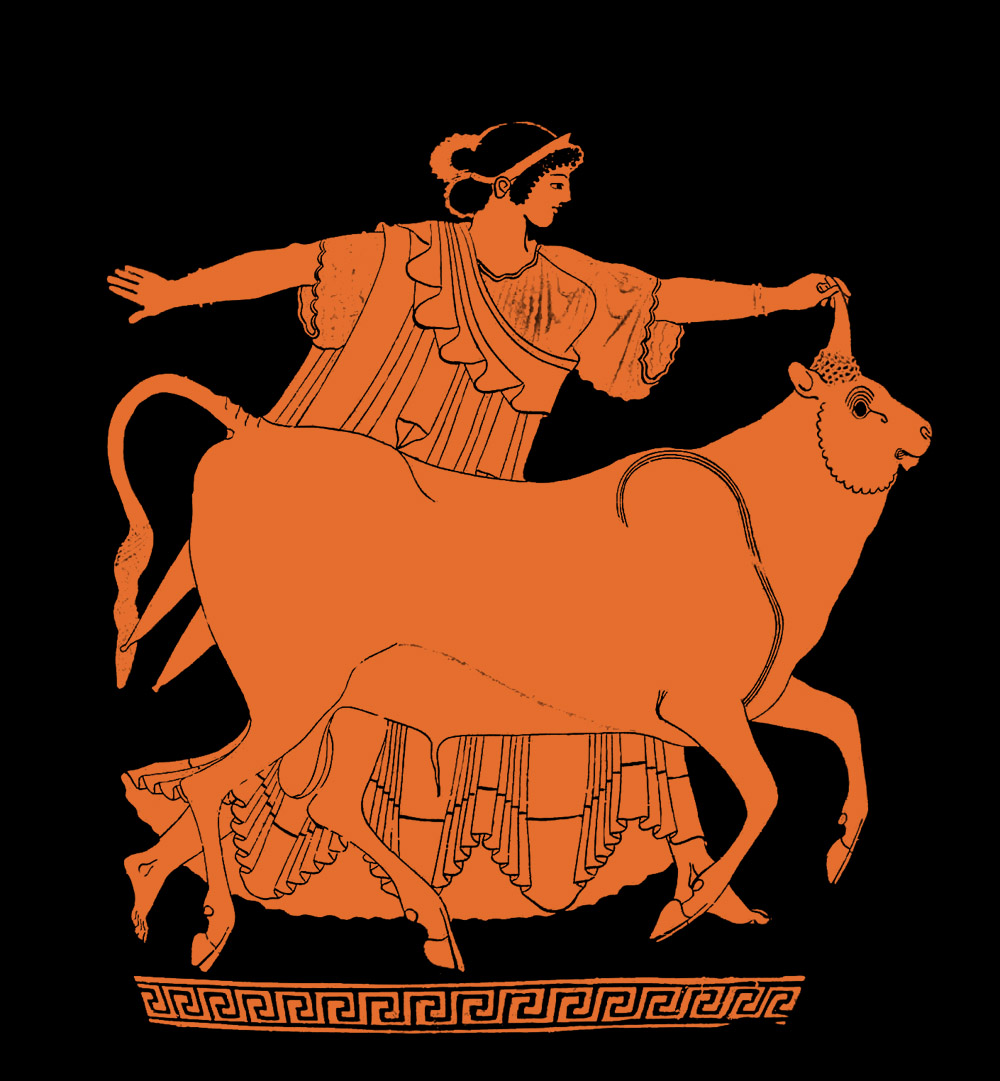
Europa and bull on a Greek vase. Tarquinia Museum, Italy, c. 480 BCE

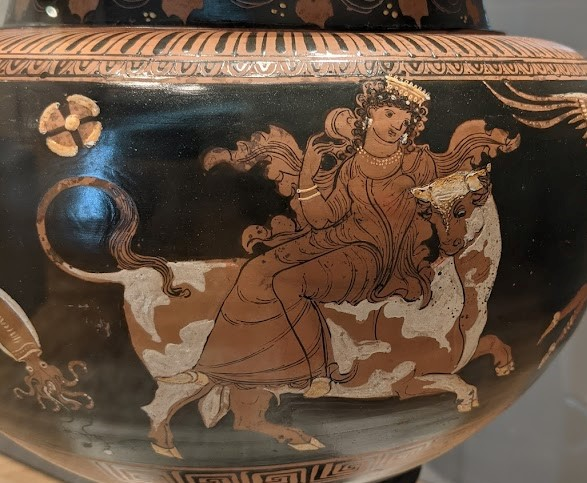
A scene of Zeus in the form of a bull abducting Europa from an Apulian red-figure dinos, dating c. 370 – c. 330 BCE, now held in the Eskenazi Museum of Art

Europa provided the substance of a brief Hellenistic epic written in the mid-2nd century BCE by Moschus, a bucolic poet and friend of the Alexandrian grammarian Aristarchus of Samothrace, born at Syracuse. (Note: The poem was published with voluminous notes and critical apparatus: Winfried Bühler, Die Europa des Moschos (Wiesbaden: Steiner) 1960.)

In Metamorphoses Book II, the poet Ovid wrote the following depiction of Jupiter's seduction:

And gradually she lost her fear, and he
Offered his breast for her virgin caresses,
His horns for her to wind with chains of flowers
Until the princess dared to mount his back
Her pet bull's back, unwitting whom she rode.
Then—slowly, slowly down the broad, dry beach—
First in the shallow waves the great god set
His spurious hooves, then sauntered further out
'til in the open sea he bore his prize
Fear filled her heart as, gazing back, she saw
The fast receding sands. Her right hand grasped
A horn, the other lent upon his back
Her fluttering tunic floated in the breeze.

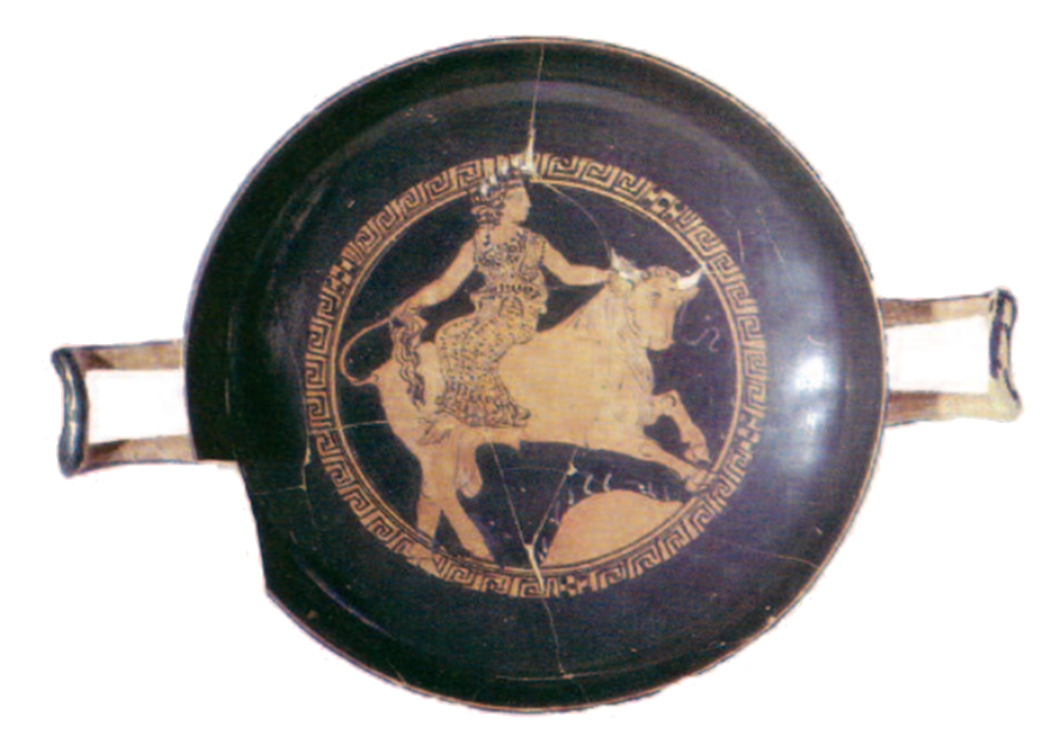
Kylix, red-figure pottery 370 BC depicts the Rape of Europa (Ratto d'Europa), tomb 32 Poggio Sommavilla necropolis, archivio SBALazio Etruria Meridionale.

His picturesque details belong to anecdote and fable: in all the depictions, whether she straddles the bull, as in archaic vase-paintings or the ruined metope fragment from Sikyon, or sits gracefully sidesaddle as in a mosaic from North Africa, there is no trace of fear. Often Europa steadies herself by touching one of the bull's horns, acquiescing.

Her tale is also mentioned in Nathaniel Hawthorne's Tanglewood Tales. Though his story titled "Dragon's teeth" is largely about Cadmus, it begins with an elaborate albeit toned down version of Europa's abduction by the beautiful bull.

The tale also features as the subject of a poem and film in the Enderby (fictional character) sequence of novels by Anthony Burgess. She is remembered in De Mulieribus Claris, a collection of biographies of historical and mythological women by the Florentine author Giovanni Boccaccio, composed in 1361–62. It is notable as the first collection devoted exclusively to biographies of women in Western literature.

== Gallery ==
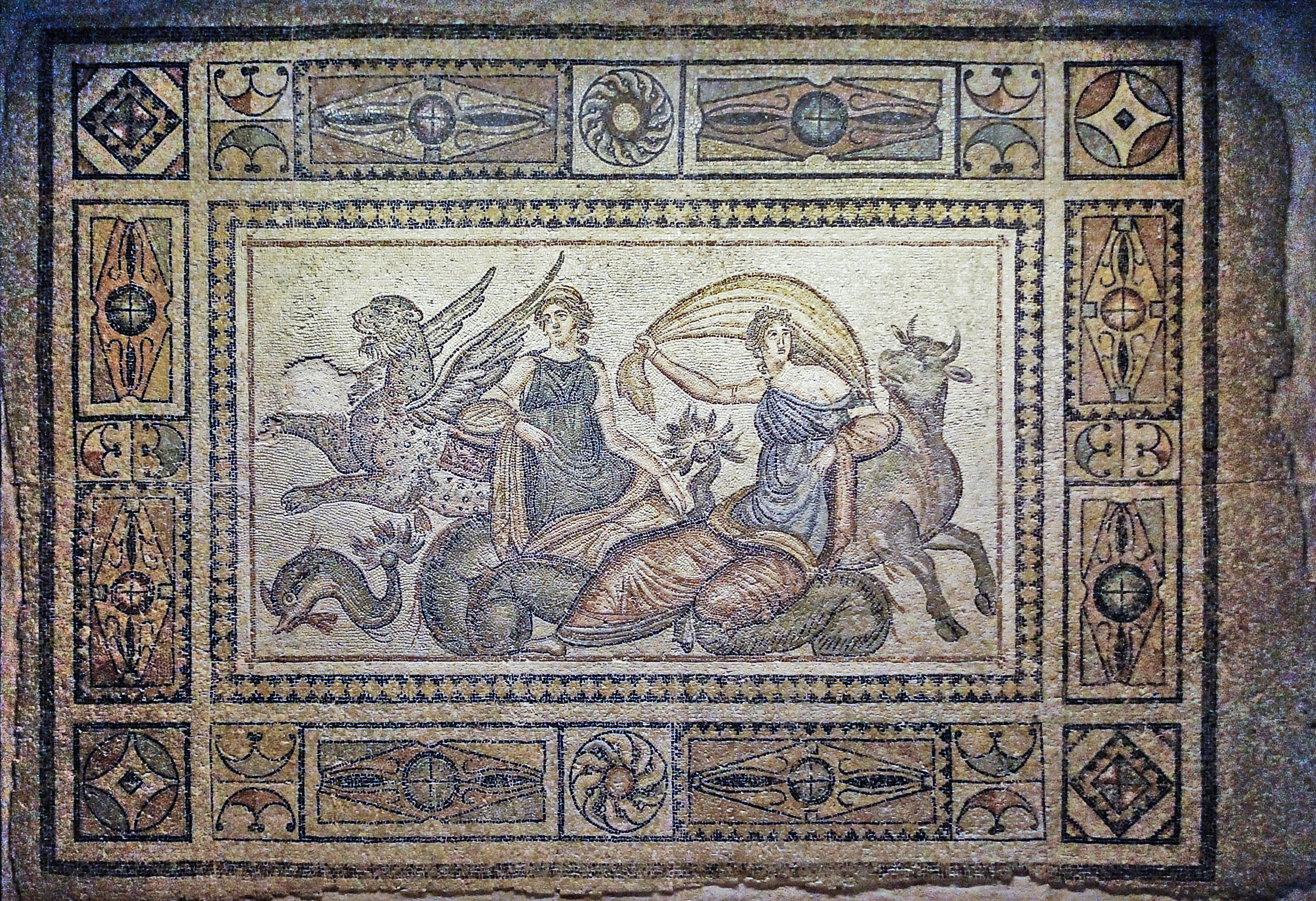
Europa velificans, "her fluttering tunic… in the breeze" (mosaic, Zeugma Mosaic Museum)

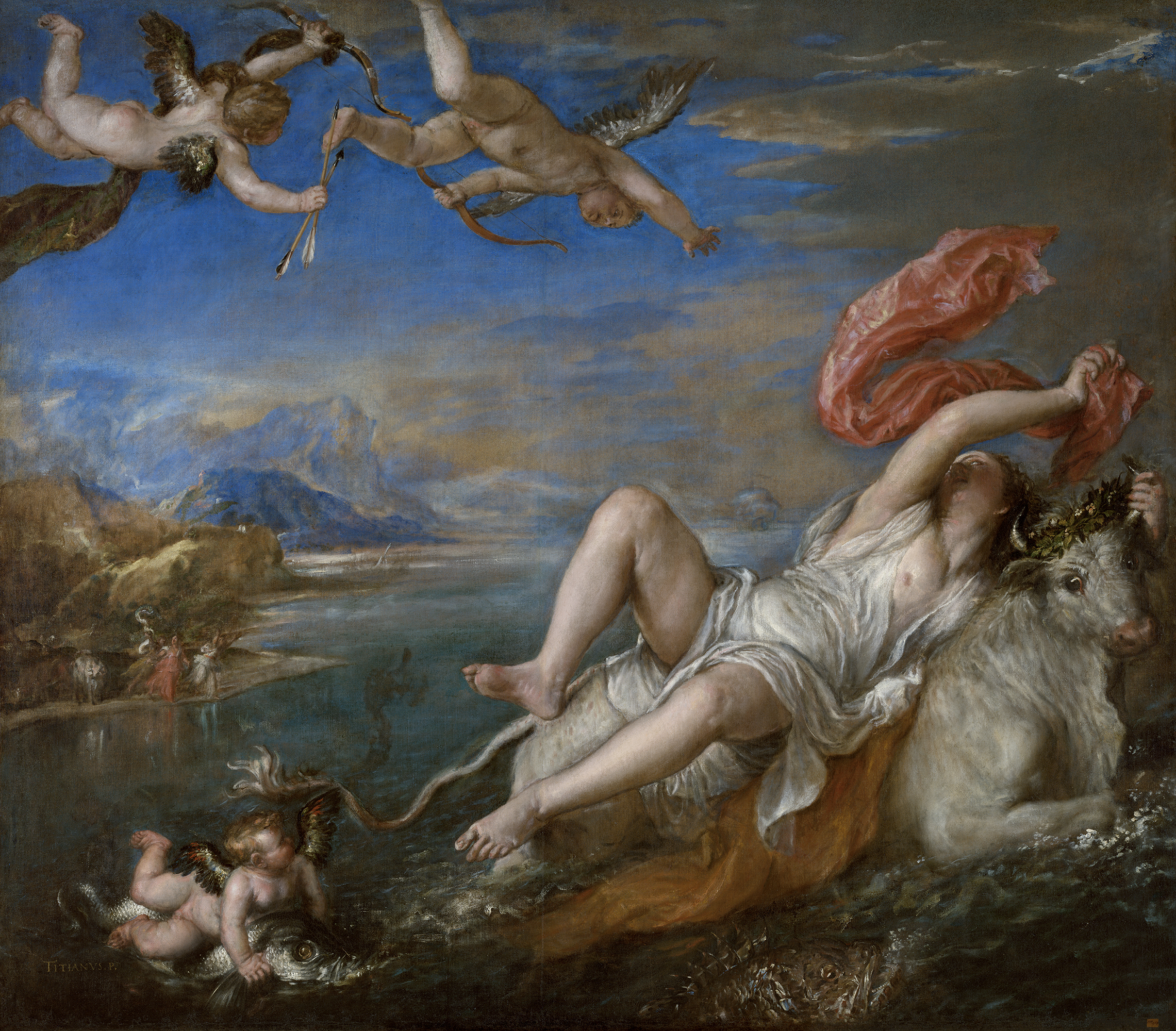
The Rape of Europa by Titian (1562)

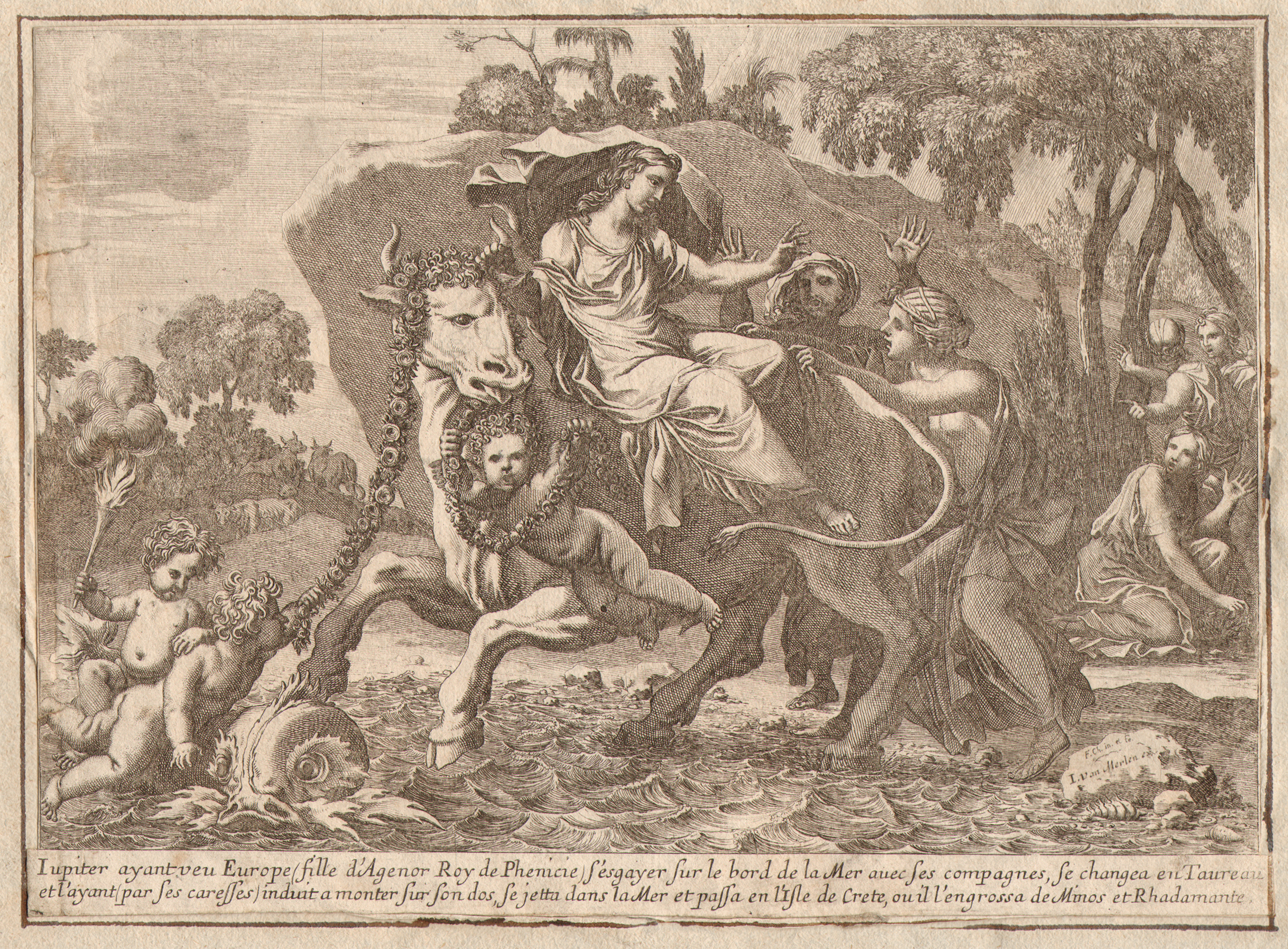
The Rape of Europa by François Chauveau (1650)

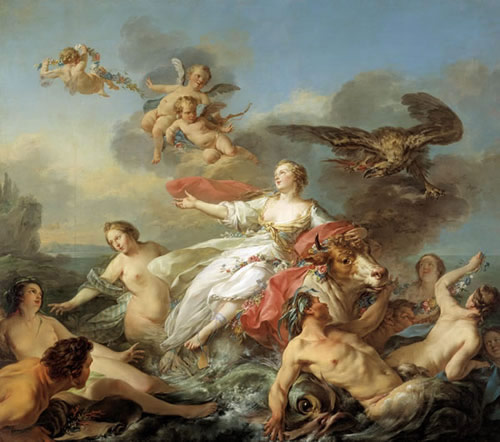
The Rape of Europa by Jean-Baptiste Marie Pierre (1750)

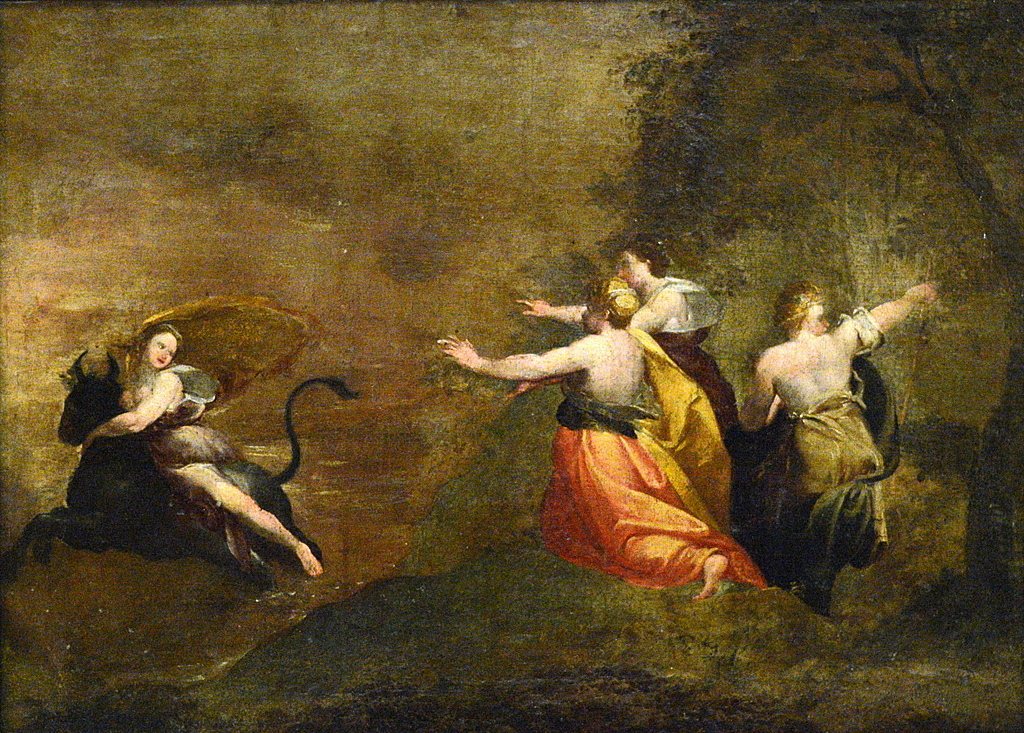
The Rape of Europa by Francisco Goya (1772)

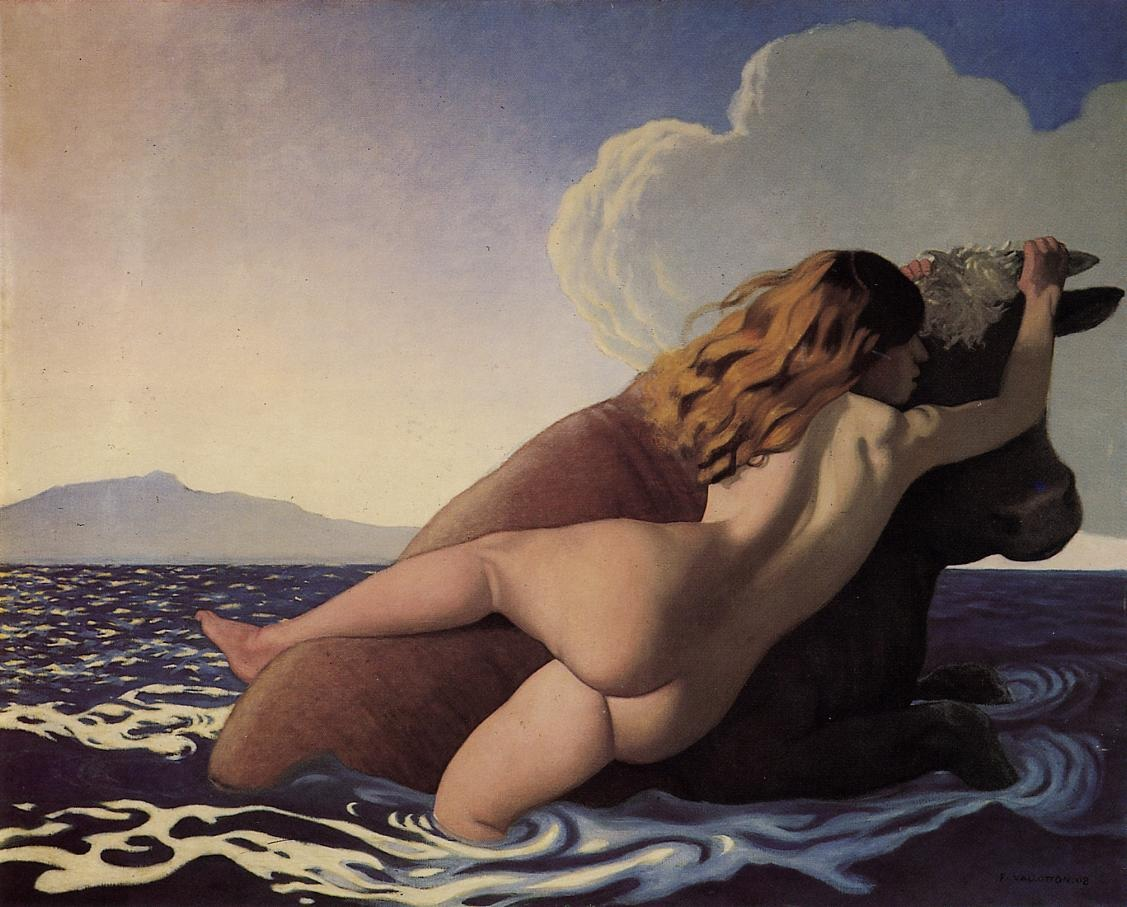
The Rape of Europa by Félix Vallotton (1908)

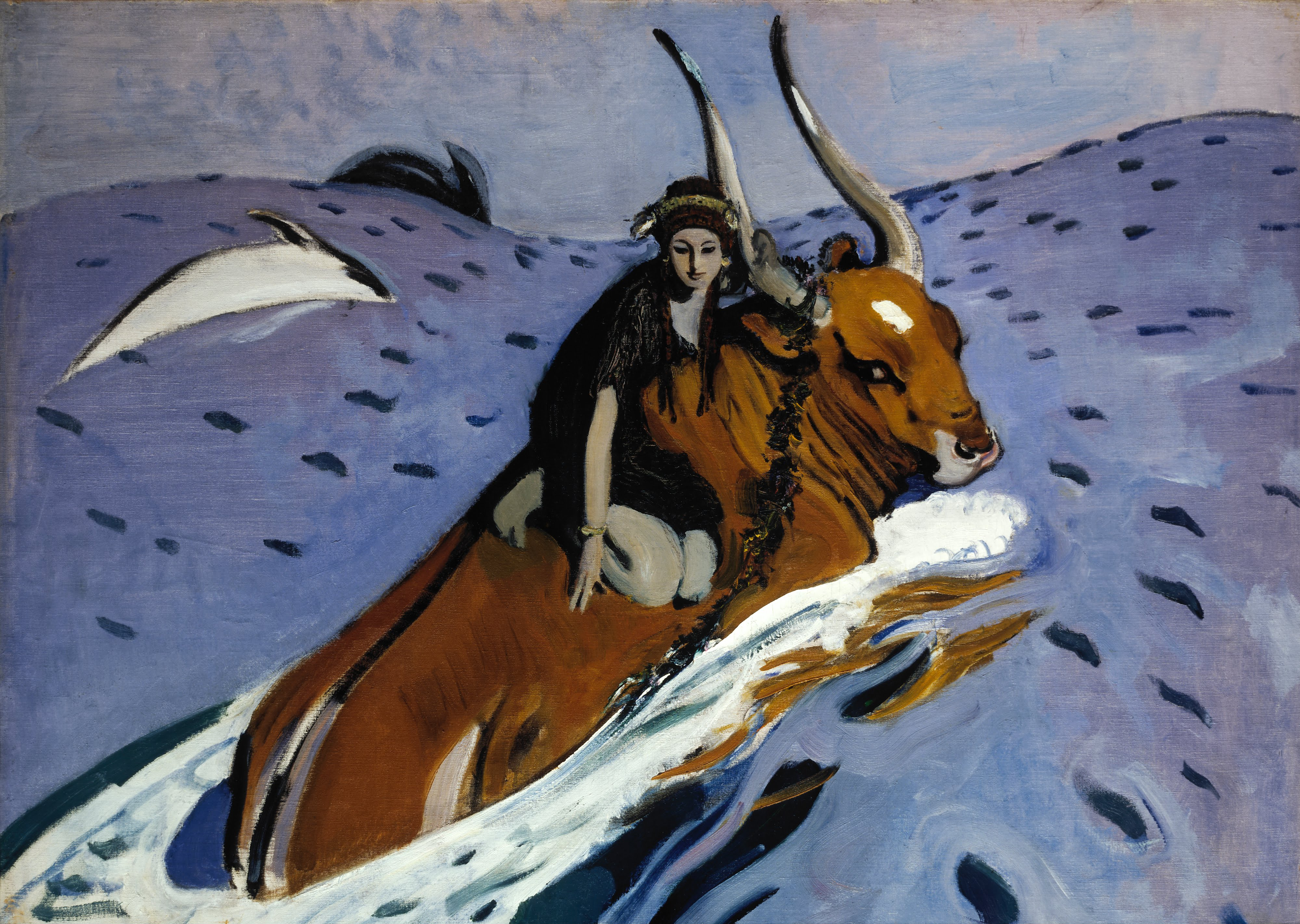
The Rape of Europa by Valentin Serov (1910)

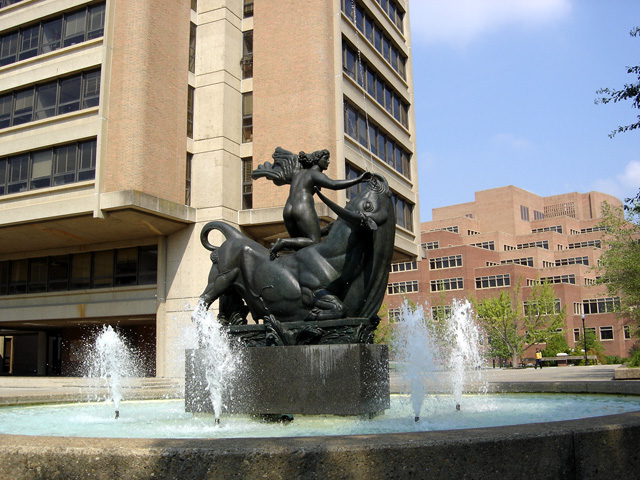
Europa on the Bull by Carl Milles (1926)

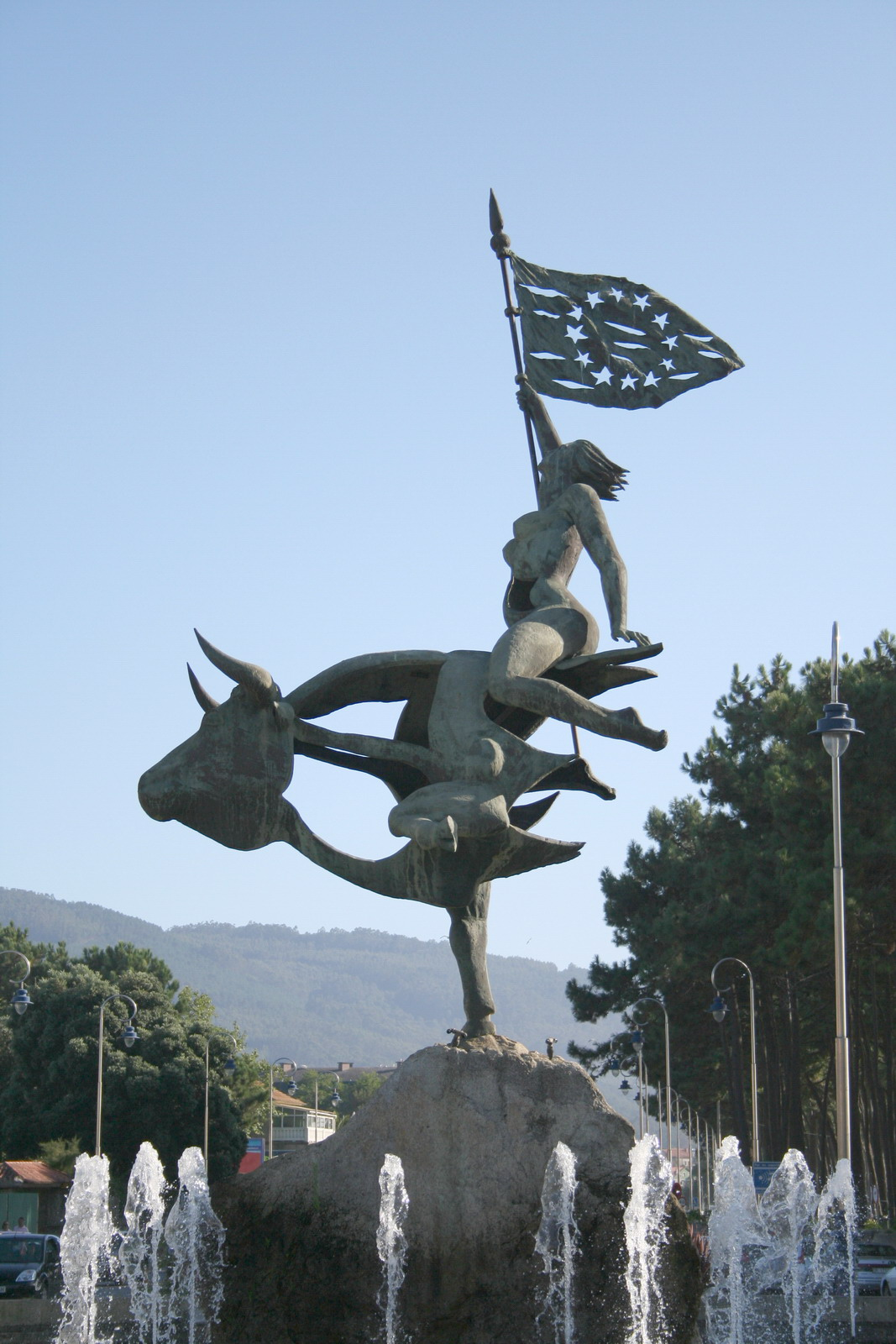
Rapto de Europa by Juan Oliveira Viéitez (1989)

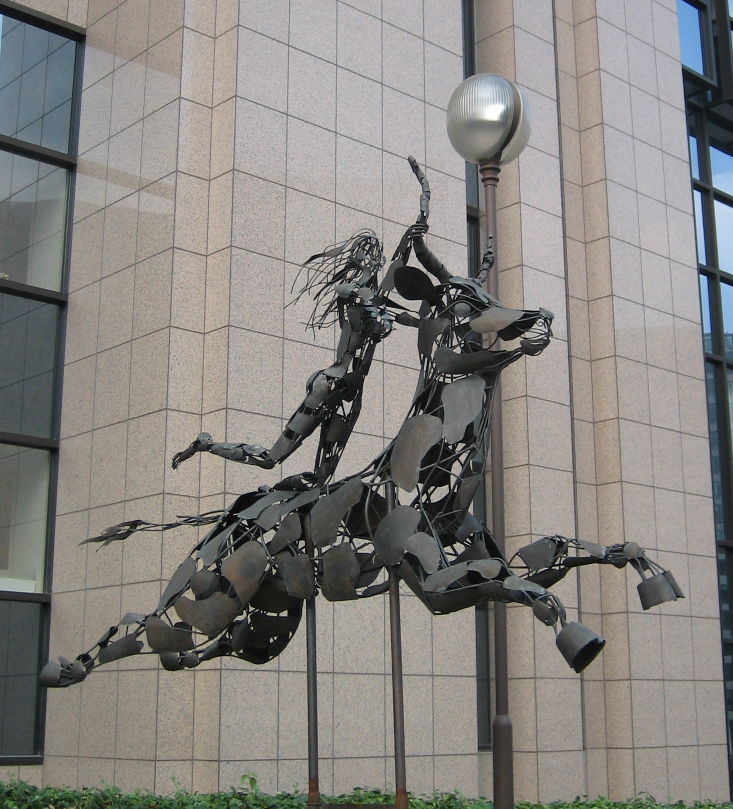
Europa by Léon de Pas (1997)

== Namesakes ==
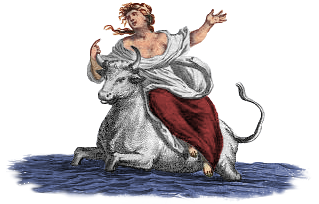
Europa and the bull, depicted as the continent's personification in Nova et accurata totius Europæ descriptio by Fredericus de Wit, 1700

=== Continent ===
The name Europe, as a geographical term, was used by Ancient Greek geographers such as Strabo to refer to part of Thrace below the Balkan Mountains. Later, under the Roman Empire the name was given to a Thracian province. Thrace or Thraike in Greek mythology, was the sister of a water nymph named Europa. Europa was also a surname given to the earth mother goddess Demeter.

It is derived from the Greek word Eurōpē (Εὐρώπη) in all Romance languages, Germanic languages, Slavic languages, Baltic languages, Celtic languages, Iranian languages, Uralic languages (Hungarian Európa, Finnish Eurooppa, Estonian Euroopa).

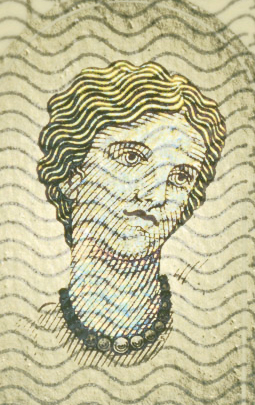
Europa depicted on the 2013 Europa Series of Euro banknotes

Jürgen Fischer, in Oriens-Occidens-Europa summarized how the name came into use, supplanting the oriens–occidens dichotomy of the later Roman Empire, which was expressive of a divided empire, Latin in the West, Greek in the East.

In the 8th century, ecclesiastical uses of "Europa" for the imperium of Charlemagne provide the source for the modern geographical term. The first use of the term Europenses, to describe peoples of the Christian, western portion of the continent, appeared in the Hispanic Latin Chronicle of 754, sometimes attributed to an author called Isidore Pacensis in reference to the Battle of Tours fought against Muslim forces.

The European Union has used Europa as a symbol of pan-Europeanism, by naming its web portal after her, depicting her on the Greek €2 coin and on several gold and silver commemorative coins, e.g. the Belgian €10 European Expansion coin and on several security features of the EU Residence Permit cards. Her name appeared on postage stamps celebrating the Council of Europe, which were first issued in 1956. The second series of euro banknotes is known as the Europa Series and bears her likeness in the watermark and hologram.

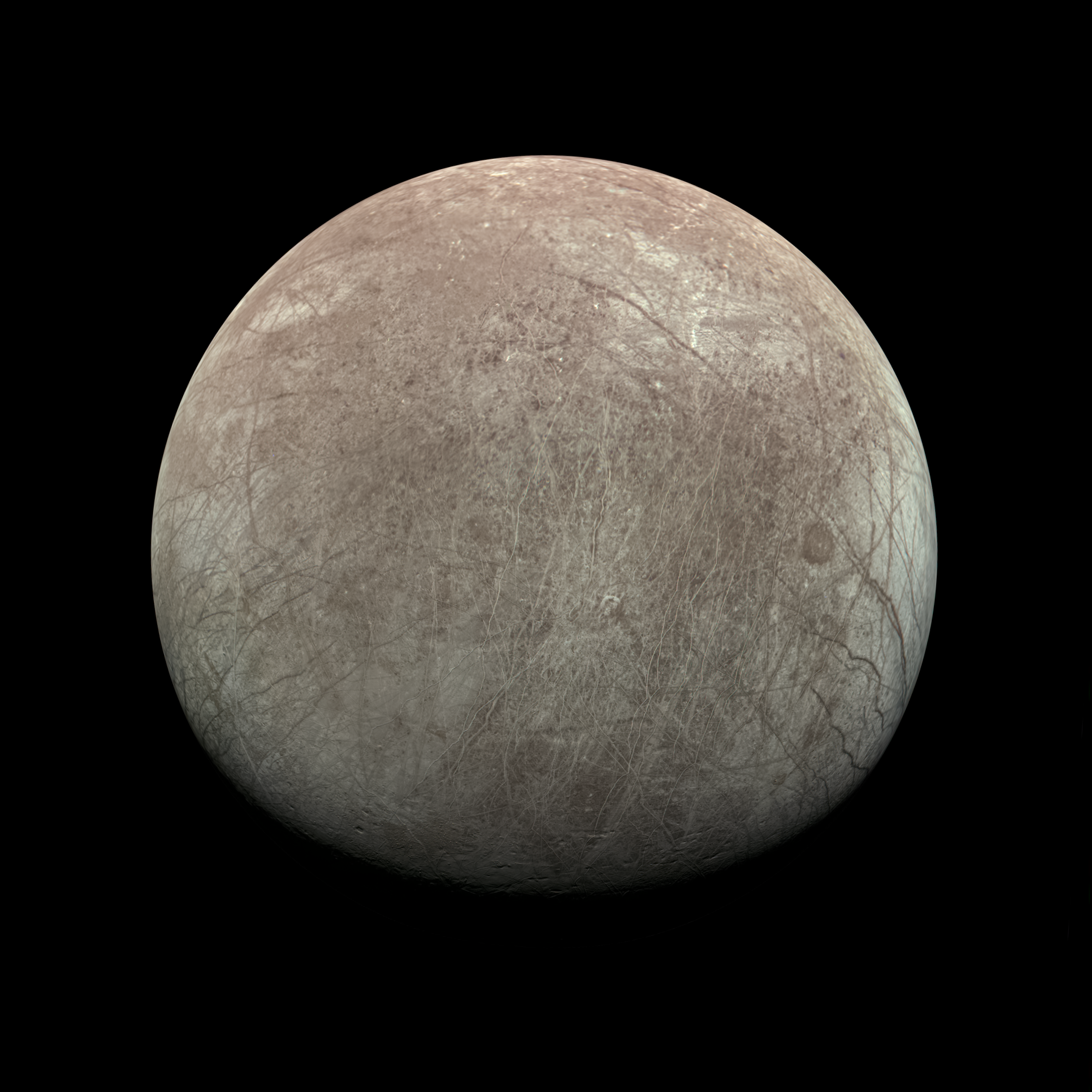
Europa, a moon of Jupiter

==== Chemical element ====
The metal europium, a rare-earth element, was named in 1901 after the continent.

=== Moon of Jupiter ===
The invention of the telescope revealed that the planet Jupiter, clearly visible to the naked eye and known to humanity since prehistoric times, has an attendant family of moons. These were named for male and female lovers of the god and other mythological persons associated with him. The smallest of Jupiter's Galilean moons was named after Europa.
