= Branchus =

Characters in Greek mythology

In Greek mythology, the name Branchus (Greek: Βράγχος) refers to the following characters, who may or may not be identical:

- Branchus, a lover of Apollo and a prophet.
- Branchus, father of Cercyon, by the nymph Argiope.
