= Catalogue of Women =

Fragmentary Ancient Greek epic poem

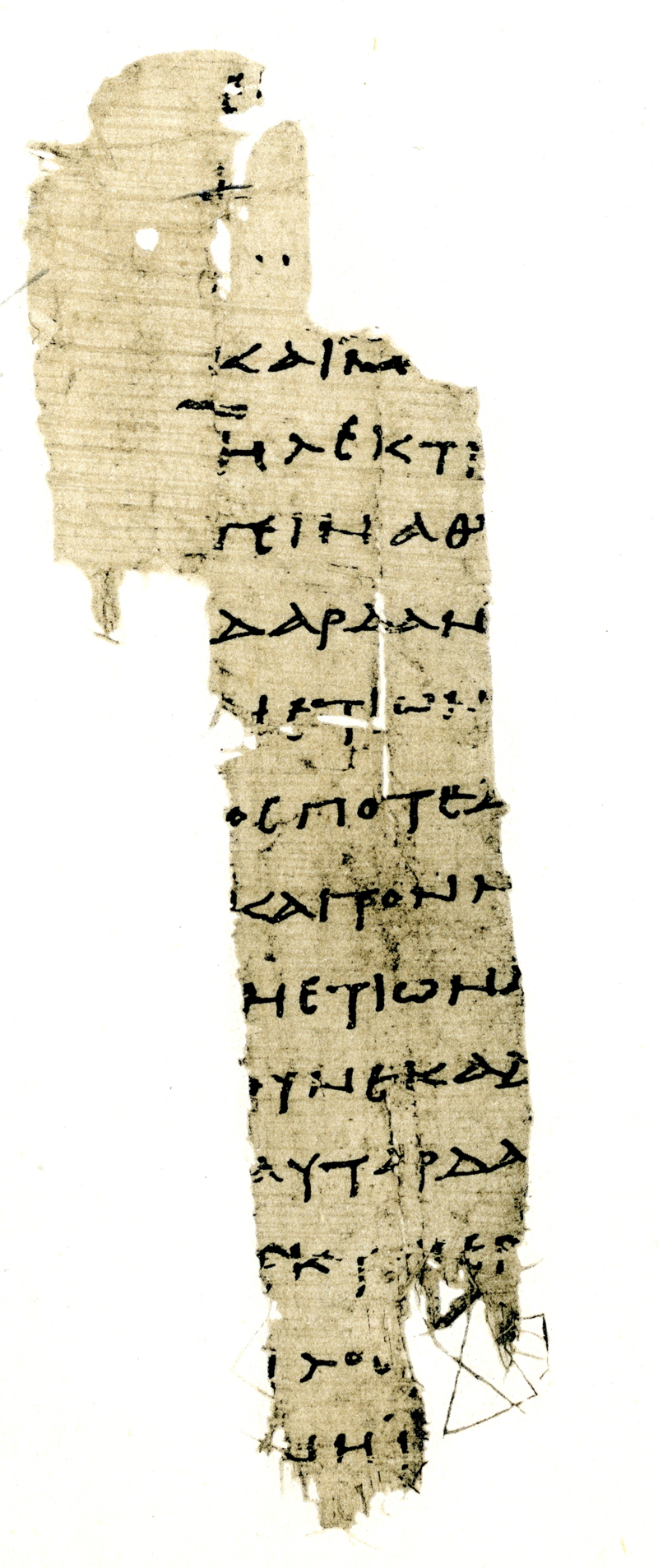
A papyrus fragment containing the beginning of the Atlantid Electra's family from book 3 or 4 (Cat. fr. 177 = P.Oxy. XI 1359 fr. 2, second century CE, Oxyrhynchus)

The Catalogue of Women (Ancient Greek: Γυναικῶν Κατάλογος, romanized: Gunaikôn Katálogos)—also known as the Ehoiai (Ancient Greek: Ἠοῖαι, romanized: Ēoîai, Ancient: [ɛː.ôi̯.ai̯]) (Note: The Latin transliterations Eoeae and Ehoeae are also used (e.g. Cantilena (1979), Solmsen (1981)); see Title and the ē' hoiē-formula, below. Though rare, Mulierum Catalogus, the Latin translation of Γυναικῶν Κατάλογος, might also be encountered (e.g. Nasta (2006)). The work is commonly cited by the abbreviations Cat., CW (occasionally HCW) or GK (= Gynaikon Katalogos).)—is a fragmentary Greek epic poem that was attributed to Hesiod during antiquity. The "women" of the title were in fact heroines, many of whom lay with gods, bearing the heroes of Greek mythology to both divine and mortal paramours. In contrast with the focus upon narrative in the Homeric Iliad and Odyssey, the Catalogue was structured around a vast system of genealogies stemming from these unions and, in M. L. West's appraisal, covered "the whole of the heroic age". Through the course of the poem's five books, these family trees were embellished with stories involving many of their members, and so the poem amounted to a compendium of heroic mythology in much the same way that the Hesiodic Theogony presents a systematic account of the Greek pantheon built upon divine genealogies.

Most scholars do not currently believe that the Catalogue should be considered the work of Hesiod, but questions about the poem's authenticity have not lessened its interest for the study of literary, social and historical topics. As a Hesiodic work that treats in depth the Homeric world of the heroes, the Catalogue offers a transition between the divine sphere of the Theogony and the terrestrial focus of the Works and Days by virtue of its subjects' status as demigods. Given the poem's concentration upon heroines in addition to heroes, it provides evidence for the roles and perceptions of women in Greek literature and society during the period of its composition and popularity. Greek aristocratic communities, the ruling elite, traced their lineages back to the heroes of epic poetry; thus the Catalogue, a veritable "map of the Hellenic world in genealogical terms", preserves much information about a complex system of kinship associations and hierarchies that continued to have political importance long after the Archaic period. Many of the myths in the Catalogue are otherwise unattested, either entirely so or in the form narrated therein, and held a special fascination for poets and scholars from the late Archaic period through the Hellenistic and Roman eras.

Despite its popularity among the Hellenistic literati and reading public of Roman Egypt, the poem went out of circulation before it could pass into a medieval manuscript tradition and is preserved today by papyrus fragments and quotations in ancient authors. Still, the Catalogue is much better attested than most "lost" works, with some 1,300 whole or partial lines surviving: "between a third and a quarter of the original poem", by one estimate. The evidence for the poem's reconstruction—not only elements of its content, but the distribution of that content within the Catalogue—is indeed extensive, but the fragmentary nature of this evidence leaves many unresolved complexities and has over the course of the past century led to several scholarly missteps.

== Title and the ē' hoiē-formula ==
Ancient authors most commonly referred to the poem as the Catalogue of Women, or simply the Catalogue, but several alternate titles were also employed. The tenth-century encyclopedia known as the Suda gives an expanded version, the Catalogue of Heroic Women (Γυναικῶν Ἡρωϊνῶν Κατάλογος), and another late source, the twelfth-century Byzantine poet and grammarian Tzetzes, prefers to call the poem the Heroic Genealogy (Ἡρωϊκὴ Γενεαλογία). But the earliest and most popular alternative title was Ehoiai (Ἠοῖαι), after the feminine formula ē' hoiē (ἠ' οἵη, Ancient: [ɛː hǒi̯.ɛː]), "or such as", which introduces new sections within the poem via the introduction of a heroine or heroines. This nickname also provided the standard title for a similar Hesiodic work, the Megalai Ehoiai or Great Ehoiai (Μεγάλαι Ἠοῖαι).

As is reflected by its use as an alternate title, the ē' hoiē-formula was one of the poem's most recognizable features. It may have belonged originally to a genre of poetry that simply listed notable heroines, but in the Catalogue the formula is used as a structuring tool that allows the poet to resume a broken branch of a family tree, or to jump horizontally across genealogies to a new figure and line of descent. A characteristic example is found in the introduction of the daughters of Porthaon at Cat. fr. 26.5–9: (Note: Unless noted otherwise, this article cites the Catalogue according to the text and numeration of the edition of record, that of Merkelbach and West (M–W). Several fragments have appeared since the publication of their primary edition (Merkelbach & West (1967)) and must be consulted in M–W's selection of fragments in the second and third editions of Solmsen's Oxford Classical Text Hesiod (Merkelbach & West (1990)); such fragments are distinguished by appending "OCT" to the fragment number. Martina Hirschberger's text and commentary (Hirschberger (2004)) follows a different numeration and includes several fragments which M–W did not believe to belong to the Catalogue or were published after the appearance of the latest OCT. In the case of fragments found in Hirschberger but not M–W, or where her commentary contributes to the discussion at hand, her fragment numbers are specified. Almost all of the fragments printed by both M–W and Hirschberger can be found, with translation, in Most (2007) in which a table outlining these different numbering systems is also present.)

Or such as (e' hoiai) the maidens sired by Porthaon,
three, like goddesses, skilled in all-beautiful works,
whom Laothoe the blameless Hyperian queen once
bore, entering Porthaon's blooming bed:
Eurythemiste and Stratonice and Sterope.
ἠ' οἷαι [κο]ῦραι Πορθάονος ἐξεγέν[οντο (Note: In editions of texts transmitted by papyri, which are often damaged, a system of editorial markers is used to clarify the basis for the printed text (see Leiden Conventions). The markers used in this article are: Full brackets ( [ ] ) mark places where the papyrus is damaged beyond legibility; letters enclosed within these brackets are editorial conjectures, some of which will be more-or-less certain, while others will be strictly exempli gratia supplements meant to give the required sense of the passage.; Dots below the line ( ̣) take the place of illegible letters; dots within full brackets give the approximate number of letters lost in a lacuna. The primary use of the sub-dot is to mark doubtfully read letters (α̣β̣γ̣), but this convention is employed sparingly in the present article.; Half brackets ( ⌊ ⌋ ) enclose text that is supplied by another source, such as an ancient quotation.)
τρε[ῖς, ο]ἷαί τε θεαί, περικαλλέα [ἔργ' εἰδυῖα]ι·
τ[ά]ς ποτε [Λ]αο[θό]η κρείουσ' Ὑπερηῒς ἀ[μύ]μων
γεί]νατο Παρθᾶνος [θ]α[λ]ερὸν λέχ[ος] ε[ἰσ]αναβᾶσα,
Εὐρ]υθεμίστην τε Στρατ[ο]νίκην [τ]ε Στ[ε]ρόπην τε.

The preceding section of the poem had dealt at some length with the extended family of Porthaon's sister Demodice, tracing her line down to the generation following the Trojan War. Here ē' hoiai (plural) is used to jump backwards in order to complete the account of the descendants of Porthaon and Demodice's father Agenor by covering the son's family. Elsewhere the formula is used in transitions to more distant branches. The Ehoie of Mestra, for example, ultimately serves to reintroduce the family of Sisyphus, Mestra's great-granduncle who hoped to win her as bride for his son Glaucus. Although that marriage does not take place, the descendants of Sisyphus are soon presented.

== Content ==
According to the Suda, the Catalogue was five books long. The length of each is unknown, but it is likely that the entire poem consisted of anywhere from 4000 to over 5000 lines. The majority of the content was structured around major genealogical units: the descendants of Aeolus were found in book 1 and at least part of book 2, followed by those of Inachus, Pelasgus, Atlas and Pelops in the later books. It is believed that a rough guide to this structure can be found in the Bibliotheca, a Roman-era mythological handbook transmitted under the name of Apollodorus of Athens which used the Catalogue as a primary source for many genealogical details and appears to have followed the poem's overall arrangement.

=== Book 1 ===
The first is by far the best-attested book of the poem, with several extensive papyri overlapping ancient quotations or coinciding with paraphrases: at least 420 verses of dactylic hexameter survive in part or entire. One papyrus includes line numbers which, taken together with the system of overlaps among the other sources, allows much of the book's content to be assigned approximate line numbers. Perhaps the most significant of these overlaps is between the papyrus containing the opening lines of the poem and the Theogony: the Catalogue was styled as a continuation of the "canonical" Hesiodic poem, with the final two verses of the Theogony standing as Catalogue of Women book 1, lines 1–2. Toward the end of the Theogony as transmitted by the manuscript tradition, following Zeus's final ordering of Olympus and his siring several key deities, the poet invokes the Muses to sing of the "tribe of goddesses ... immortals who slept with mortal men, bearing children like gods". After some 150 verses on this topic, the proem to the Catalogue comes in the form of another re-invocation of the Muses to introduce a new, only slightly more terrestrial topic (Cat. fr. 1.1–5):

Now do sing of the tribe of women, sweet-voiced
Olympian Muses, daughters of aegis-bearing Zeus,
they who were the best in those days [ …
and loosed their girdles [ …
mingling with the gods [ …
Νῦν δὲ γυναικῶν ⌊φῦλον ἀείσατε, ἡδυέπειαι
Μοῦσαι Ὀλυμπιάδε⌊ς, κοῦραι Διὸς αἰγιόχοιο
αἳ τότ' ἄρισται ἔσαν [
μίτρας τ' ἀλλύσαντο ̣[
μισγόμεναι θεοῖσ[ιν

The immediately subsequent lines describe significant characteristics of the heroic age. The first allowed for the liaisons that are the poem's ostensible subject: gods and mortals freely interacted in those days. A further significant detail about the heroic condition is offered next in one of the most puzzling passages of the Catalogue. Men and women are said to have been not "equally long-lived" (ἰσαίωνες, isaiōnes, a hapax legomenon), but it is unclear whether this refers to different lifespans among the heroes themselves, a difference between the lives of the heroes and "today's" man, or between the lifespans of the heroes and the gods. The differing fates of the heroes are then described: some appear to have lived a long life characterized by perpetual youth, while others were apparently condemned to an early death by the gods. The papyrus is damaged at this point, and the full implications of these comparisons are unknown. The Muses are next addressed again, asked to sing of "however many [Zeus] lay with, siring the race of glorious kings … and Poseidon [lay with] … Ares … Hermes … [Heph]aestus … Heracles"; here the papyrus ends.

==== First families ====
The repeated use of the introductory phrase "or such as …" implies an initial "such as …", and it is likely that this first woman treated was Pyrrha, wife of Deucalion. There is some debate about whether the Catalogue included an account of the Flood myth, but the creation of a race of humans born from stones cast by Deucalion and Pyrrha does appear to have figured in the poem. Zeus unsurprisingly had first pick from the catalogue of women, and sired Hellen by Pyrrha. Pyrrha also had three daughters by Deucalion: Thyia, Protogeneia and Pandora, who was named for her maternal grandmother, the famous Pandora. Like their mother, these three lay with Zeus, bearing sons from whom several early Greek tribes were said to descend. Thyia bore Magnes and Macedon; Protogeneia bore Aethlius, the grandfather of Aetolus; and Pandora's son was Graecus.

But it was the family of Hellen, who would himself ultimately be the eponym for the entire Greek world, that had the greatest mythological significance. He sired Dorus, Xuthus and Aeolus, apparently by Othryis, the nymph of Mount Othrys. Dorus was the eponym of the Dorians, and his son Aegimius' sons, Dymas and Pamphylus, gave their names to two of the three Dorian tribes, the Dymanes and Pamphyli. The third division was called the Hylleis, after Heracles' son Hyllus, with whom Pamphylus and Dymas migrated to the Peloponnese. Xuthus married Erechtheus' daughter Creusa and was the father of Ion and Achaeus, along with a daughter named Diomede. The relation between the progenitors of Greek tribes among the descendants of Deucalion is outlined in the following table:

Deucalion	Pyrrha	Zeus
(stones)
Hellen (hellenes)	Thyia	Pandora	Protogeneia	leleges
Dorus (dorians)	Xuthus	Aeolus (aeolians)	Magnes (magnetes)	Macedon (macedones)	Graecus (graeci)	Aethlius
Aegimius	Achaeus (achaeans)	Ion (ionians)	Endymion
Dymas (dymanes)	Pamphylus (pamphyli)	Aetolus (aetolians)

The genealogical relation between Greek tribes within the family of Deucalion in the Catalogue

==== Aeolids ====
What was likely the largest unified stemma to be treated, the account of the descendants of Aeolus and Aenarete's five daughters and seven sons, stretched from before the 200th line of book 1 well into the second book. The sons who were certainly found in the Catalogue are Cretheus, Athamas, Sisyphus, Salmoneus, Deion (or Deioneus) and Perieres. A seventh son's name is obscured in lacuna: he has been identified tentatively as Minyas, Locrus or a second Magnes, not the eponym of the Magnetes, but the father of Dictys and Polydectes of the Danaë-Perseus myth. No similar doubt attends the identities of Aeolus' daughters: they were Peisidice, Alcyone, Calyce, Canace and Perimede. The families of the daughters were treated first, and much of the middle of book 1—over 400 lines—was devoted to recounting their descendants. Aeolus' extended family, via both sons and daughters, is notable for a concentration of fantastical narratives and folk elements of a sort largely absent from the Homeric poems, beginning with the doomed, hubristic love of Ceyx and Alcyone, who called one another "Zeus" and "Hera" and were turned into the kingfisher and halcyon as punishment (frr. 10a.83–98, 10d OCT, 15).

After treating the Thessalian families of Peisidice and Canace, the poet turned to the intermingled Aetolian-Elian lines of Calyce and Perimede. Perimede had earlier in the book borne two sons to the river Achelous, one of whom was the grandfather of Oeneus, Hippodamas. To Aethlius Calyce bore Endymion, whose son Aetolus was the eponym of Aetolia and the great-grandfather of Demodice and Porthaon, through whom the later Aetolian and Elian genealogies were traced. Somewhere within these families, Eurytus and Cteatus were found in a form more fearsome than they were in the Iliad: in the Catalogue they were fierce conjoined twins with two heads, four arms and an equal number of legs. Most significant for the epic tradition, however, was the marriage of Demodice's son Thestius and Porthaon's daughter Eurythemiste which produced the daughters Leda, Althaea and Hypermnestra, who are introduced in a group Ehoiai at fr. 23a.3–5.

Louis Billotey's Iphigénie (1935) depicting Iphigenia (center) in embrace with Clytemnestra, with Artemis gazing at the girl. In Euripides' Iphigeneia in Aulis, Iphigeneia was turned into a deer to save her from being sacrificed so that the Achaean fleet could sail for Troy. In the Catalogue, the goddess saved Iphigenia (called Iphimede) and enfranchised her as "Artemis Enodia", or Hecate.

Leda's marriage to Tyndareus is followed by the births of Clytemnestra, Timandra and Phylonoe, the last of whom Artemis made immortal. Clytemnestra and Agamemnon had two daughters, Electra and Iphimede, the name used in the poem for the woman later and more famously known as Iphigenia. It had been prophesied that she must be sacrificed to Artemis before the Greek fleet could sail for Troy, but in the Catalogue version of events the goddess replaced her with an eidolon and immortalized Iphimede as "Artemis Enodia", or Hecate. Next Orestes' birth and matricide are reported, the earliest extant account of his killing Clytemnestra, as the planned sacrifice of Iphimede/Iphigenia is first found in the Catalogue. Timandra's marriage to Echemus follows, followed in turn by Leda's bearing the Dioscuri to Zeus in several damaged lines. It is unknown if Helen's birth was reported here, for the testimonia leave her parentage uncertain. Althaea lies with Ares and bears Meleager, whose heroic qualities are described along with his death at the hands of Apollo during the conflict with the Curetes that was the sequel to the Hunt for the Calydonian Boar. Among Althaea's children by Oeneus, Deianeira is singled out for her role in the death and apotheosis of Heracles. The poet next turns his attention to the Porthaonids (see above) and closes out his account of the female Aeolids with the Sirens, daughters of Sterope and Achelous.

The Ehoie of Salmoneus' daughter Tyro provides the transition to the families of the male Aeolids. As king of Elis, Salmoneus forced his subjects to worship him as Zeus and simulated the god's thunder and lightning by dragging bronze cauldrons from his chariot and throwing torches through the air. The real Zeus destroyed king and subjects alike, but spared Tyro and conducted her to the house of her uncle Cretheus in Thessaly because she wrangled with her impious father. There she became enamored of the river Enipeus, but Poseidon had his own designs upon Tyro and in the guise of the river lay with her, siring Neleus and Pelias. The brothers did not get along, and Zeus gave them different realms to rule: Pelias received as his lot Iolcos; to Neleus fell Pylos in the western Peloponnese. The house of Neleus now takes center-stage. Heracles sacked Pylos, killing all the male Neleids, save Nestor who was off in Gerenia, another Messenian city. Periclymenus, a son of Neleus to whom Poseidon had granted the ability to change shape, was Pylos' only bulwark against the onslaught of Heracles, and the Catalogue-poet granted him a brief aristeia which ended when Athena pointed out that the bee on Heracles' chariot was actually the Pylian defender. Following the account of Nestor's marriage and family, the contest for Neleus' daughter Pero was narrated. The father would give her hand to whoever could rustle the cattle of Iphicles from Phylace, a feat accomplished by Bias with the help of his brother Melampus. The poet then turned to the family of Pelias as the last assignable papyrus fragment from book 1 breaks off. It is likely that Tyro's children by Cretheus—Aeson, Pheres and Amythaon—followed, and there might have been room in the book to at least start the family of Cretheus' brother Athamas.

Athamas ruled in Boeotia and had a complicated family life, several details of which are known to have played part in the Catalogue. His first children were Phrixus and Helle, whose mother was Nephele. In what was the first episode of the Argonautic saga, she gave her children a ram with a Golden Fleece upon which they fled the intrigues of their stepmother Ino according to other sources. Athamas was driven mad by the gods, perhaps because he took the young Dionysus into his household, and slaughtered his and Ino's son Learchus; Ino herself jumped into the sea with their son Melicertes and became the sea-goddess Leucothea. At some point before his marriage to Ino, Athamas had sired Leucon and Schoeneus by Themisto, and Leucon's daughters Peisidice, Euippe and Hyperippe were given extended group treatment in the Catalogue.

=== Book 2 ===
It is uncertain at what point among the extant fragments the division between books 1 and 2 fell, but at least some of the Aeolid families were covered in the second book. The families of Perieres, Deion and Sisyphus (in that order) were most likely found in the 2nd book because there does not appear to be enough room left in book 1 to accommodate them as a group after the children of Neleus and Pelias. It was once thought that the Ehoie of Atalanta opened the book, but recently published evidence casts doubt upon this view (see Book 3, below).

Perieres' family was centered around Messene. His son Leucippus had several daughters, but Arsinoe was singled out for extensive treatment. To Apollo she bore Asclepius, whom Zeus killed. In a rage Apollo killed the Cyclopes, after which Zeus was about to hurl him into Tartarus when Leto interceded and arranged for Apollo to serve as a laborer for Admetus instead. Directly following the Asclepius affair comes the Ehoie of Asterodeia, the daughter of Deion. She bore Crisus and Panopeus to Phocus; the brothers did not get along, quarreling while still in the womb. Another daughter of Deion, Philonis, bore Philammon to Apollo and Autolycus to Hermes. Philammon sired Thamyris; Autolycus, the grandfather of Odysseus, was a master thief who could change the appearance of his booty to avoid detection. Autolycus' daughter Polymele, the mother of Jason, is apparently born directly preceding the Ehoie of Mestra, the daughter of Erysichthon.

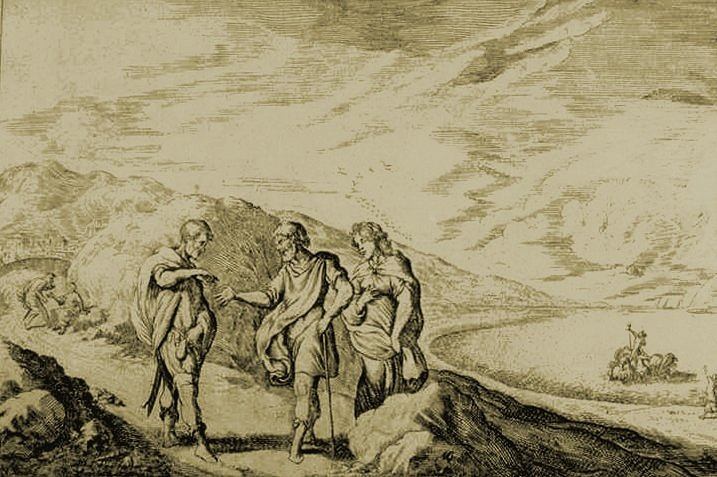
Erysichthon sells his daughter Mestra. An engraving from among Johann Wilhelm Baur's illustrations of Ovid's Metamorphoses, which included a version the myth that differed from Mestra's story in the Catalogue.

Mestra's story is one of the best preserved and most studied sections of the Catalogue. She had the ability to change her shape at will, a skill which her father Erysichthon exploited in service of a ravening hunger with which he had been cursed and for which reason the people had nicknamed him Aethon (Αἴθων, Aithon, "Blazing"). He would marry off Mestra for the bride prices she garnered, only to have the girl return home in some different form. The most notable victim of this plot was Sisyphus, who, despite his characteristic cunning, could never retain custody of his would-be daughter-in-law. Strife arose between Sisyphus and Erysichthon which no mortal could resolve, and the case was handed over to another authority. The text is damaged at this point, and identity of the mediator is a matter of dispute, as is the nature of the verdict rendered. Exactly how this judgement resolves the quarrel over Mestra is obscure, (Note: West (1963c, pp. 754–5) believes that Sisyphus had originally taken Mestra on credit, and Erysichthon claims, now that the girl is back in his possession, that the transaction has not been finalized. In West's opinion, the verdict forces Erysichthon to give him some goods as a penalty. Casanova (1977) believes that Sisyphus had paid for Mestra, and that Erysichthon now demands a new deal: the judgement rules against Erysichthon; further conjectures are presented by Ormand (2004, pp. 334–6).) but Sisyphus ultimately comes out on the losing end, for Mestra does not bear children to Glaucus. Instead Poseidon whisks her off to Kos, where she bears Eurypylus to the god. Eurypylus' descendants rule the island, which is sacked by Heracles in a brief allusion to the great hero's adventures. On his way home from attacking Troy for the horses of Laomedon, he assaulted Kos before going on to participate in the gigantomachy.

The Ehoie of Mestra closes with her returning to Athens to care for her father, but the poet's attention stays with Sisyphus, as he and his son are the male subjects of the Ehoie of Eurynome which immediately follows. She was wise and beautiful, having been taught womanly arts by Athena. Sisyphus attempted to cheat her of her cattle, but Zeus intervened. Although he did not get what he was after, Sisyphus did accomplish with Eurynome what he could not with Mestra: a marriage for Glaucus. The gods again got in the way, though, and she bore Bellerophontes to Poseidon, who gave his son the winged horse Pegasus with which Bellerophontes slew the Chimera. In the Iliad this task was presented as the order of Proetus' father-in-law Iobates, and in the Catalogue it appears to be followed immediately by the marriage of Bellerophontes and a daughter of the Lycian king.

==== Inachids ====
In the Bibliotheca the descendants of Inachus followed Deucalion's, and the Catalogue appears to have followed the same order, likely introducing the Inachids via the Ehoie of Niobe, the river god's granddaughter. To Zeus she bore Argus, the eponym of Argos, who in turn sired Peiren, the father of Io. Zeus's affair with Io had a place in the Catalogue, for ancient authors cite the poem's version of this myth when quoting an aition for the fact that "all's far in love ...", at least:

From then he made the oath unenforceable among humans
when it comes to clandestine deeds of Cypris.
ἐκ τοῦ δ' ὅρκον ἔθηκεν ἀποίνιμον ἀνθρώποισι
νοσφιδίων ἔργων πέρι Κύπριδος.

Zeus and Io's "clandestine deeds" produced a son, Epaphus, who was the father of Libya. The families of her two sons Agenor and Belus were covered in depth: the former's line in book 3, the latter's following his birth. Belus had a daughter, Thronia, who bore Arabus (the eponym of Arabia) to Hermes; Belus' sons were Aegyptus and Danaus.

The myth of the mass-wedding of Aegyptus' fifty sons and Danaus' fifty daughters came at this point, but little survives of the narrative in the Catalogue. Danaus and his daughters fled to Argos and introduced the practice of digging wells, "making waterless Argos well-watered Argos" (Ἄργος ἄνυδρον ἐὸν Δανααὶ θέσαν Ἄργος ἔνυδρον). Aegyptus' sons followed the Danaids to Greece in order to compel them to marry, and, as in the predominant version of the myth, Hypermnestra alone consummated her union with Lynceus and bore Abas, whose sons were Acrisius and Proetus. The daughters of Proetus offended Hera or Dionysus or both in some way, and were cursed with leprosy or madness which could only be cured by Melampous, a service which Abas rewarded by granting the seer and his brother Bias shares of Argos to rule. Acrisius' daughter was Danaë. Her golden liaison with Zeus, the birth of Perseus, and mother and son's involuntary exile in the larnax are quickly recounted, and Perseus' siring of Alcaeus, Sthenelus and Electryon by Andromeda also comes in quick succession.

=== Book 3 ===
The division between books 2 and 3 presents a special problem for the reconstruction of the Catalogue. A scholion to Theocritus, Idyll 3.40 appears to attribute the story of Atalanta to "Hesiod in book 3", a method of citation that almost certainly refers to the present poem. One papyrus concludes with what appears to be the beginning of the first line of Atalanta's Ehoie followed by a forked paragraphos and blank space, suggesting that it is a reclamans; another papyrus (pictured) clearly transmits the ends of the first few lines of her section preceded by blank space, giving the possibility that it was the beginning of a book. These two fragments would combine to give:

Or such as she, [much]-famed lord Sch[oeneus's]
[daughter, ... ] swift-footed noble Atalanta
[ ... ] with the gleam of the Charites
ἠ' οἵη Σχ[οινῆος ἀγακλε]ιτοῖο ἄνακτος
̣ ̣ ̣ ̣ ̣ ̣ ̣ ̣ ̣ ̣ ̣ ̣ ̣ ̣ ̣]σι ποδώκης δῖ' Ἀταλάν[τη
̣ ̣ ̣ ̣ ̣ ̣ ̣ ̣ ̣ ̣ ̣ ̣ Χαρί]των ἀμαρύγματ' ἔχο[υσα

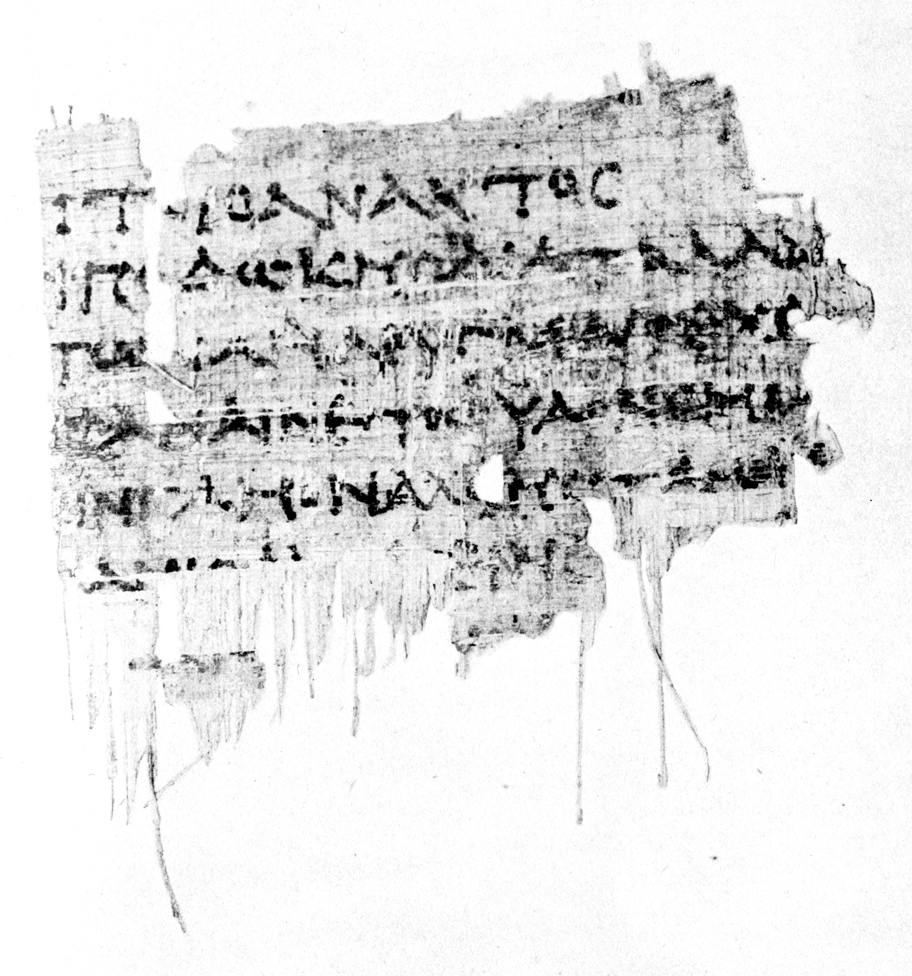
The beginning of the Atalanta-Ehoie (Cat. fr. 73. 1–7 = P.Lit.Lond. 32, third century BC, Gurob)

The account that follows is one of the most extensive and exciting episodes of the Catalogue to survive from antiquity. Atalanta wished to avoid marriage, but a throng of suitors gathered because of her beauty. Her father Schoeneus promised her hand to the one who could beat his swift daughter in a footrace, with one further condition: any who accepted the challenge and lost would be put to death. Aphrodite had given one of the contestants, Hippomenes, three golden apples with which to temp the girl off course; these he threw as he ran and begged Atalanta to have pity upon him. The toss of the third apple finally accomplished its aim, but the couple did not live happily after: through the will of Zeus Atalanta was transformed into lion because she had seen "what it is not lawful to see", which presumably means that she had unlawfully entered a holy precinct. This is where the evidence for Atalanta leaves off, and it remains unknown just where and how the passage fit in the Catalogue. It is possible that the attribution to book three was simply incorrect, and Atalante's Ehoie came within the family of Athamas in books one or two. Another possibility is that she was introduced in the context of her mother's family. Her identity in the Catalogue is unknown, but this hypothesis could allow for Atalanta to appear within the Inachid stemma, following the Danae-Ehoie within the extended family of Belus.

==== Agenorids ====
In the Catalogue and later mythographic tradition, the family of Belus' brother Agenor was something "like a repository for aliens and displaced persons". His son Phoenix was the eponym of Phoenicia, and if Cepheus and Cadmus were also his sons, the Agenorids would have been present in Aethiopia and Thebes as well. By one Alphesiboea Phoenix sired Adonis. Cassiepeia bore to him Phineus; she was perhaps also the mother of Phoenix's daughter Europa, but the girl's mother might have been Telephaassa, as in Moschus' Europa.

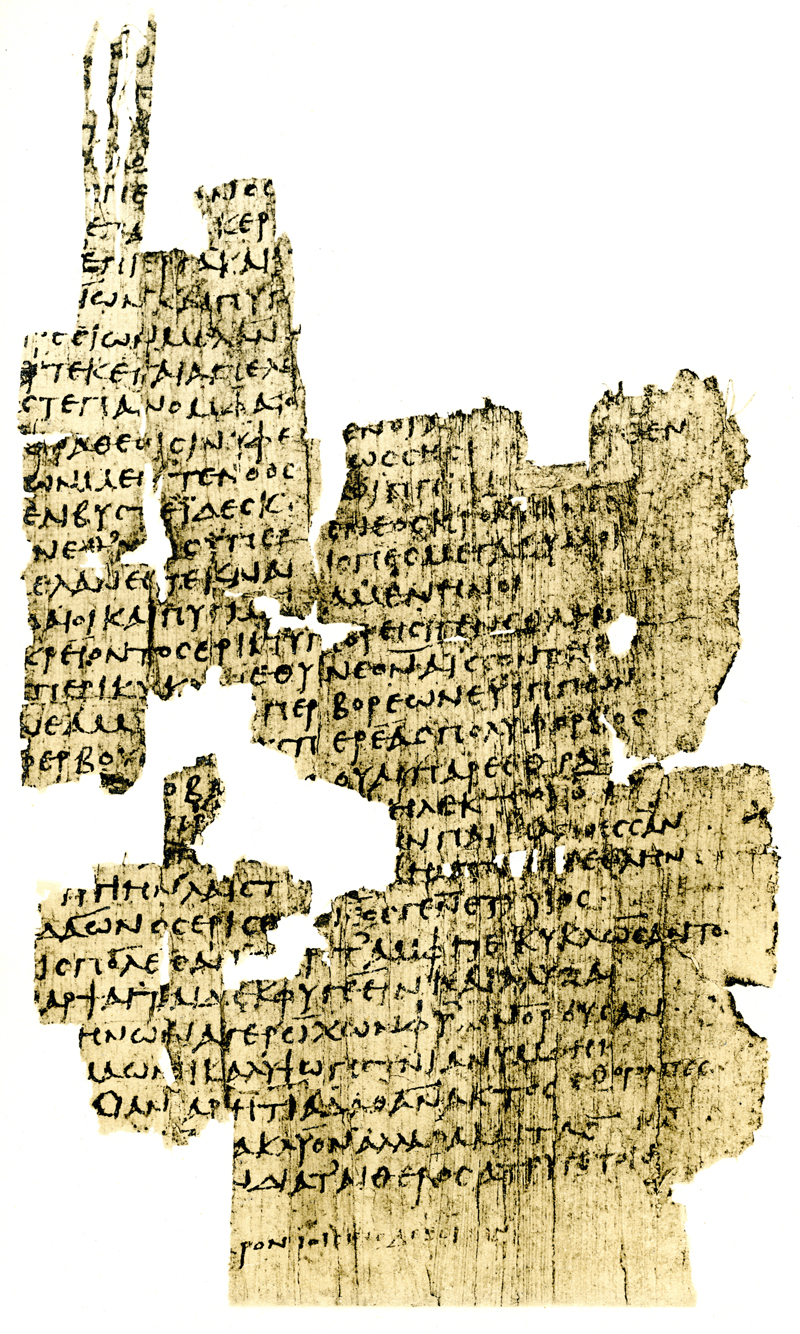
Part of the Gês Períodos (Cat. fr. 150 = P.Oxy. XI 1358 fr. 2 col. i, second century CE, Oxyrhynchus)

Europa's tale, well known in later classical literature and beyond, appears in a largely familiar form in the Catalogue. She caught Zeus's eye while she and some friends were gathering flowers in a meadow. The god transformed into a bull with breath smelling of saffron, in the guise of which he abducted Europa, carrying her upon his back to Crete. There she bore Minos, Rhadamanthys and Sarpedon to Zeus, and he gave her a necklace made by Hephaestus that would figure in Theban saga as the Necklace of Harmonia. Sarpedon ruled Lycia, and was apparently granted a lifespan equal to three generations of men by Zeus. His death at Troy and the rain of blood it inspired Zeus to send is briefly described. Minos ruled Crete, succeeding his stepfather Asterion. Poseidon sent up from the sea a bull which had sex with Minos' wife Pasiphae, siring the Minotaur. To Minos she also bore Deucalion, Catreus, Androgeos and Eurygyes, though it is equally possible that these last two names referred to a single son. At least one daughter, Ariadne, was surely present, for the myth of Androgeos–Eurygyes' death in Athens and the subsequent sacrifice of Athenian youths to the Minotaur will presuppose Theseus' expedition to Crete and Ariadne's complicity in slaying the beast.

Phineus was even better-traveled than his sister Europa, and his biography in the Catalogue was apparently a "pièce de résistance" meant to conclude the geographically diverse Inachid stemma with an appropriate flourish. He ruled in Thrace, but was kidnapped by the Harpies. Zetes and Calais, the Boreads, pursued the tormentors and tormented to the ends of the earth. The poet catalogued many far-flung and remarkable races encountered during the chase, including: the Katoudaioi ("Subterranean Men"), Pygmies, Melanes ("Black Men"), Aethiopians, Libyans, "horse-milking" Scythians, Hemikynes ("Half-Dogs") and the Makrokephaloi, as well as griffins. Ephorus called the episode the Gês Períodos (Γῆς Περίοδος, "Journey Around the World"), and it was once thought that this title referred to an independent work, one erroneously attributed to Hesiod. This view was disproved conclusively in 1911 with the publication of an extensive papyrus fragment (pictured) of the episode which derived from the same bookroll that contained the myth of Europa described above.

==== Arcadia ====
It is likely that the section describing the Arcadian descendants of Pelasgus and Arcas followed that of the Inachids. Pelasgus was autochthonous; he sired Lycaon either by the Oceanid Meliboea or by Cyllene, the oread of an Arcadian mountain which still bears her name. Lycaon's fifty impious sons drew the ire of Zeus and were all destroyed, save Nyctimus. The majority of the subsequently covered Arcadian figures descend from Arcas, who was the son of Zeus and Callisto, a local nymph. A familiar version of her catasterism is attributed to "Hesiod" by Pseudo-Eratosthenes, but the Hesiodic work intended in this citation might have been the Astronomia. Arcas had at least two sons: Elatus and Apheidas. Elatus sired Aepytus, the father of Tlesenor and Peirithous; Apheidas was the father of Stheneboea, the wife of Proetus, and Aleus. Aleus' daughter Auge was for some reason entrusted to the care of Teuthras in Mysia, where she lay with Heracles and bore Telephus. Telephus was on the Mysian throne when the Greek expedition to Troy accidentally landed there and found themselves fighting fellow "Achaeans".

==== Atlantids ====
In the Bibliotheca, the Arcadian genealogies are immediately followed by the Atlantids, and this progression is known to mirror the structure of the Catalogue because other fragments of the papyrus roll that transmits the Telephus myth cover families of Atlas' daughters: Taygete, Electra, Alcyone, Sterope, Celaeno, Maia and Merope. Maia bore Hermes to Zeus on Mount Cyllene. Taygete also slept with Zeus, becoming the mother of Lacedaemon, through whom much of the Spartan line was traced, including Tyndareos, the father of Helen, and Penelope, the wife of Odysseus. To Zeus yet again Electra bore Dardanus, the progenitor of the Trojan line, and Eetion, who was killed for sleeping with Demeter. Dardanus' sons were Erichthonius and Ilus. Hyrieus and Hyperes were Poseidon's children by Alcyone. Her section included the Ehoie of Hyrieus' daughter Antiope, who bore Amphion and Zethus to Zeus. Hyperes' daughter Arethusa slept with Poseidon and was changed to a spring in Euboea, but not before bearing Abas, the eponym of the Abantes. His line is traced down to Elephenor, leader of the Abantes in the Trojan War. Sterope lay with Ares and bore Oenomaus, but it is possible that this union was delayed to book four as part of the section treating the family of Pelops and Oenomaus' daughter Hippodameia.

=== Book 4 ===
Before the papyri began to accrue, the longest extant passage of the Catalogue was known from the Shield of Heracles, the first 56 lines of which were borrowed from book 4 according to an ancient hypothesis to the Shield. This passage, the Ehoie of Alcmene, recounts how she went to Thebes with her husband Amphitryon, who could not consummate the marriage until he had avenged the deaths of her brothers at the hands of the Taphians and Teleboans. As Amphitryon returned having accomplished this feat, Zeus lay with Alcmene; upon his return that very night, so too did Amphitryon. To the god Alcmene bore Heracles and to the hero she bore Iphicles.

Alcmene belongs to the Pelopid line—her mother Lysidice was a daughter of Pelops and Hippodameia—, and the passages preceding her Ehoie also concern Pelopids. Three of Pelops' daughters married sons of Perseus: Lysidice married Electryon, Nicippe wed Sthenelus, and Astydameia wed Alcaeus. Nicippe and Sthenelus' daughter Astymedusa married Oedipus, and at the funeral games in his honor his son Polynices caught the eye of his future wife Argeia, the daughter of Adrastus. Pelops' son Atreus was the father of Pleisthenes who, contrary to the better known genealogy, was the father of Agamemnon and Menelaus. Their mother was Aerope, the daughter of Catreus, and their births were reported in the verses directly preceding the Ehoie of Alcmene.

Besides the Pelopid line, and whatever remained of the Atlantid stemmata among which it ultimately belongs, little is known for certain about the further content of book 4. It is possible that an Athenian section including the various autochthonous kings of Athens and the daughters of Cecrops was found here. A family springing from the river Asopus has also been proposed for this region based on the presence of "several persons or families that other sources represent as descended from daughters of Asopos". The most notable family that would belong to this section is that of Asopus' daughter Aegina, the nymph of the island that bears her name who slept with Zeus and bore Aeacus. Fearing that Aeacus would be lonely on his island, Zeus changed all of Aegina's ants into men, spawning the tribe of Myrmidons, a play upon their name and the Greek word for "ant", μύρμηξ, mýrmēx. This is the family to which Achilles belongs, the most notable hero in the Trojan saga, as well as his father Peleus and uncles Telamon and Menoetius.

=== Book 5 ===
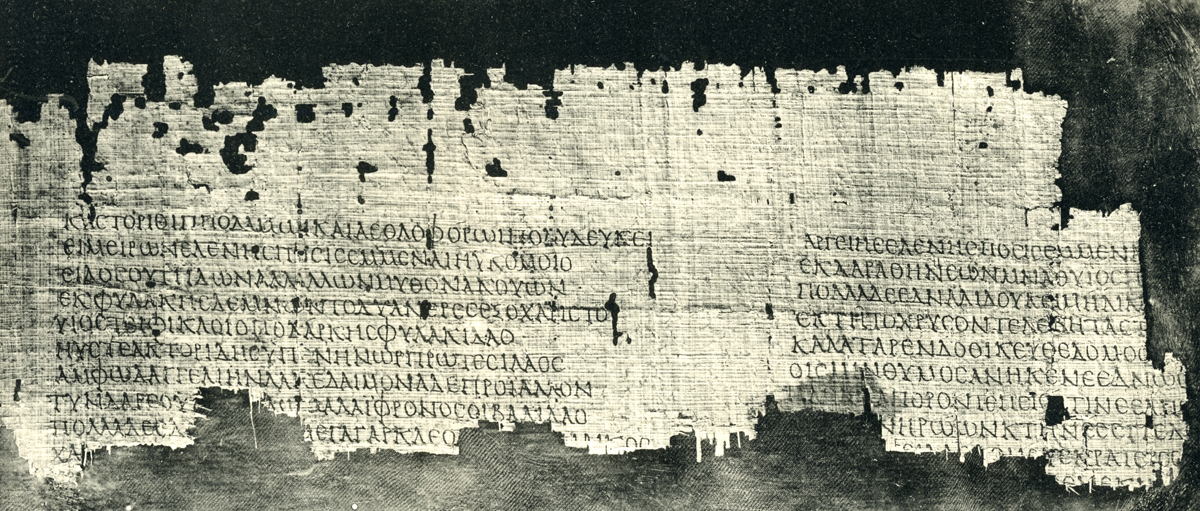
Portions of the Catalogue of Suitors ( Cat. frr. 199–200 = P.Berol. inv. 9739 col. iv–v, second century AD)

The final book was different in that it apparently left behind the genealogical structure of the first four books. Book five opened with a nearly 200-line catalogue of the suitors of Helen, similar in style to the Catalogue of Ships in Iliad book 2. Although it is likely that the entire catalogue included twenty-five to thirty suitors, only twelve are attested by name. From Argos Amphilochus and Alcmaeon, the sons of Amphiaraus, attempted to win Helen, but were perhaps never able to join in the contest because of their punishment for the matricide of Eriphyle. Ever shrewd, Odysseus did not give gifts but simply sent envoys to Castor and Polydeuces, because he knew that Menelaus would ultimately prevail. Thoas was not so wise and gave many sheep and cows in the hope of winning Helen. From Phylace, many gifts were given by Podarces and Protesilaus, who were cousins in the Catalogue, not brothers as in the Catalogue of Ships. Athenian Menestheus gave many gold cauldrons and tripods, confident that he was the wealthiest of all the heroes. Ajax wooed Helen from Salamis, promising to pillage the surrounding lands and give their possession as part of his gift. Idomeneus made the long journey from Crete himself, aware of Helen's beauty only from secondhand accounts.

Before giving his decision, Tyndareus bound all the suitors to his fateful oath: should anyone ever take his daughter by force, all those who had wooed her must exact vengeance upon her abductor. To this all the suitors readily agreed, each believing that he would be given Helen's hand. At this point the Catalogue of Suitors has come to a close, but even as Menelaus' success is reported, the poet introduces Achilles because of his status as the greatest hero of the Trojan saga and his central role in Zeus's plan to bring the Heroic Age to a close. With the aid of Agamemnon, Menelaus had given the most bride prices, but were Achilles already of age, he would surely have won Helen's hand, "for neither warlike Menelaus nor any other human on earth would have defeated him". But Achilles was not present, and Menelaus won Helen, who bore Hermione to him.

==== The end of the Heroic Age ====
The marriage of Helen and Menelaus precipitates the Trojan War, the event that ultimately brings the heroic age to an end, but the circumstances surrounding this transition in the Catalogue are unclear. Directly following the birth of Hermione strife arises among the gods, and Zeus hatches a plan to stir up trouble among mankind. The exact meaning of this plan is obscure because of deficiencies in the text, and several interpretations have been proposed, the most commonly accepted being that Zeus plans to destroy a great number of men by causing the war, ultimately removing the heroes to a life lived in conditions resembling the Golden Age. Another possibility is that Zeus intends to destroy the race of heroes and return the world to its former order, when gods slept with each other, not mortals. In any event, a great change is coming, and as the final placed fragment of the Catalogue breaks off, several enigmatic scenes are sketched. A great storm arises which dwindles the strength of mankind:

From the lofty trees falling groundward were many
beautiful leaves shed; earthward the fruit would fall
as Boreas blew furiously by Zeus's decree.
The sea would swell, and everything trembled at this,
mortal strength would wither, the fruit would dwindle,
in the spring season, when in the hills the hairless one bears
three children in the third year within its nook of the earth.
πο⌋λλὰ δ' ἀπὸ γλωθρῶν δενδρέων ἀμύοντα χαμᾶζε
χεύετο καλὰ πέτηλα, ῥέεσκε δὲ καρπὸς ἔραζε
π]νείοντος Βορέαο περιζαμενὲς Διὸς αἴσηι,
ο]ἴδεσκεν δὲ θάλασσα, τρόμεσκε δὲ πάντ' ἀπὸ τοῖο,
τρύχεσκεν δὲ μένος βρότεον, μινύθεσκε δὲ καρπός,
ὥρηι ἐν εἰαρινῆι, ὅτε τ' ἄτριχος οὔρεσι τίκτει
γ]αί[η]ς ἐν κευθμῶνι τρίτωι ἔτεϊ τρία τέκνα.

These lines, described by Martin Litchfield West as "the finest passage of poetry yet known from the Catalogue", might parallel Calchas' prophecy in Iliad 2, which presages the first nine fruitless years of the Trojan War via the image of a snake devouring nine sparrows. Here the "hairless one", a kenning for a snake, gives birth to what appears to be the first of three sets of triplets, and as the remains of the papyrus become more meager, the snake sloughs its skin, representing the regeneration that will come once the heroic age comes to an end and the world is given over to mortals.

=== Notable unplaced and disputed fragments ===
Many fragments that are securely attributed to the Catalogue, some of which are relatively substantial, cannot be placed within the poem because their content is either too obscure or could be assigned to different individuals or genealogies which are themselves difficult to locate within the five books.

==== Cyrene ====
The place of Cyrene within the poem has implications beyond the level of content, for if her narrative is to be connected to the city of Cyrene in Libya, the terminus post quem for the composition of the Catalogue would be 631 BC, the approximate year of that city's foundation. Pindar, Pythian 9 tells how Apollo saw Cyrene hunting in her native Thessaly and was immediately enamored of the tomboy. The god goes to the cave of the wise centaur Chiron and asks who she is and whether it would be wise to consort with her. Chiron then prophesies that it is fated for Cyrene and Apollo to mate, and that he will bring her across the sea to Libya, where she will be queen of a portion of the land and bear to him a son, Aristaeus. A scholium on the ode states that "Pindar took the story from an Ehoie of Hesiod's" (ἀπὸ δὲ Ἠοίας Ἡσιόδου τὴν ἱστορίαν ἔλαβεν ὁ Πίνδαρος) and relates the opening lines of the section (Cat. fr. 215):

Or such as she in Phthia, with beauty from the Charites,
she who dwelt by the water of Peneus, Cyrene
ἠ' οἵη Φθίηι Χαρίτων ἄπο κάλλος ἔχουσα
Πηνειοῦ παρ' ὕδωρ καλὴ ναίεσκε Κυρήνη

Richard Janko, who believes that the Catalogue was composed c. 690, argues that the extent to which Pindar relied upon the Hesiodic text is unknown and that, even if Apollo did carry Cyrene to Libya, this does not presuppose an aetiology of the city. Others have argued that the citation is also vague regarding just which Hesiodic poem included the Cyrene-Ehoie, the Catalogue or the Megalai Ehoiai: the latter might have included a narrative similar to Pindar's, with the former presenting a different version of the myth, if indeed the Catalogue treated Cyrene at all. The complete removal of Cyrene would not, however, be easily accommodated by related evidence—it would presumably also involve transferring two fragments concerning Aristaeus which have traditionally been attributed to the Catalogue, and his son Actaeon certainly appeared in the poem.

==== Actaeon ====
The myth of Actaeon is known to have been narrated in the Catalogue by virtue of a paraphrase found in a fragmentary dictionary of metamorphoses. According to the dictionary, the Catalogue included a variant of the myth in which Actaeon was changed into a stag by Artemis and then killed by his own hounds because he attempted to take Semele as his wife, thus angering Zeus, who had designs upon the woman. Before this testimonium appeared, another papyrus containing 21 hexameters related to the Actaeon myth was published by Edgar Lobel, who tentatively attributed the text to the Catalogue. As the fragment opens, Actaeon has already been torn apart by his dogs, and a goddess—Athena or, less likely, Artemis (Note: The general consensus is that this is Athena because she occasionally acts as Zeus's courier and because the goddess is referred to as the "daughter of great aegis-bearing Zeus" (αἰγιόχοιο Διὸς κούρη μεγάλοιο, aigiokhoio Dios kourē megaloio), one of Athena's common appellations; cf. Lobel (1964, p. 6), Janko (1984, p. 302), DePew (1994, pp. 413–15). Casanova (1969a, pp. 33–4), argues that similar epithets are also applied to Artemis, and that her central role in the myth and status as the goddess of both the hunt and the taming of animals would make her a deity more likely to cure the hunting dogs of their madness in line 15.)—arrives at Chiron's cave. She prophesies to the centaur that Dionysus will be born to Semele and that Actaeon's dogs will roam the hills with him until his apotheosis, after which they will return to stay with Chiron. At this point the papyrus is damaged, but it is clear that the dogs are delivered from a "madness" (λύσσα, lussa, line 15) and begin to mourn their master as the goddess returns to Olympus. Merkelbach and West did not include this papyrus in their edition of the fragment, the latter calling it an "incoherent epic pastiche" which would cause the author of the Catalogue to "turn in his grave if he knew that it had been attributed to him". According to Glenn Most, some scholars believe that the text is Hellenistic, but it is demonstrably archaic, and at least a few classicists today consider it to be part of the Catalogue. (Note: More doubtful is the attribution of ten corrupt verses found in the manuscripts of Apld. Bibl. 3.4.4 which concern the Actaeon myth. After relating the motivation for Actaeon's death which was found in the Catalogue (but attributing it to Acusilaus), Apld. reports the better-known version, in which the transformation and death are punishment for Actaeon's having seen Artemis bathing. He continues to say that Artemis transformed him into a stag and drove the dogs into a "madness" (λύσσα, cf. P.Oxy. 2509.15) so that they wouldn't recognize their master as they devoured him. Distraught, they then went in search of Actaeon, before coming back to the cave of Chiron, who made an image of the dead man so as to cease their grief. Following this paraphrase are the ten verses interpolated into the text of the Bibliotheca (Janko (1984, p. 305)) which name some of the hounds and describe their rending of Actaeon. Malten (1911, pp. 20–3) and Casanova (1969a) believe that these lines also derive from the Catalogue, but many consider them Hellenistic (e.g. Powell (1925)), and none of the recent editions include them; cf. Janko (1984, pp. 305–7).)

== Date, composition and authorship ==
During antiquity the Catalogue was almost universally considered the work of Hesiod. Pausanias reports, however, that the Boeotians living around Mount Helicon during his day believed that the only genuine Hesiodic poem was the Works and Days and that even the first 10 lines of that poem (the so-called "hymn to Zeus") were spurious. The only other surviving expression of doubt is found in Aelian, who cites "Hesiod" for the number of Niobe's children, but qualifies his citation with "unless these verses are not by Hesiod, but have been passed off falsely as his, like many other passages". But Aelian's skepticism could have stemmed from the belief, still common today, that Hesiodic poetry was especially susceptible to interpolation, and it is impossible to tell whether he regarded the entire Catalogue as spurious or not. (Note: The situation is complicated by the fact that the word translated as "verses" above, ἔπη, can also mean "poem" (cf. LSJ s.v. ἔπος). Hirschberger (2004, p. 42), appears to follow the latter interpretation; cf., already, Marckscheffel (1840, p. 140) on this passage and Merkelbach & West (1965, p. 300) on a similar issue regarding the Wedding of Ceyx.) These two passages are, in any event, isolated, and more discerning critics like Apollonius of Rhodes, Aristophanes of Byzantium and Crates of Mallus apparently found no reason to doubt the attribution to Hesiod, going so far as to cite the Catalogue in arguments concerning the content and authenticity of other Hesiodic poems.

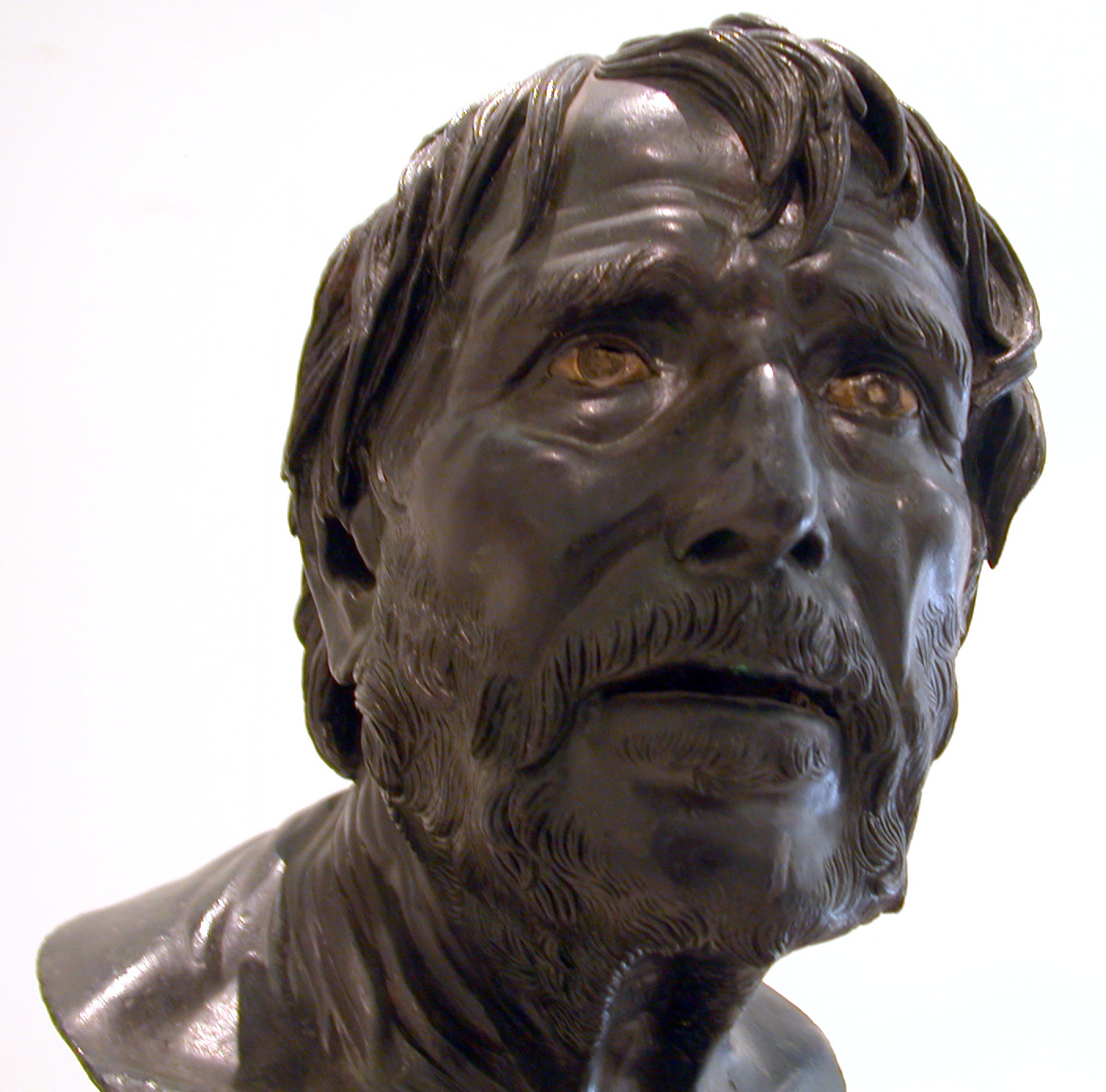
A Roman-era sculpture possibly representing Hesiod, believed by ancient readers to be the author of the Catalogue of Women

Modern scholars have not shared the confidence of their Hellenistic counterparts, and today the Catalogue is generally considered to be a post-Hesiodic composition. Since Hesiod is supposed to have lived around the turn of the seventh century BCE, the Cyrene-Ehoie alone could guarantee that the poem was not his. Richard Janko's survey of epic language, on the other hand, suggests that the Catalogue is very early, nearly contemporary with Hesiod's Theogony, and Janko sees no reason why the Catalogue "should not be by the same poet as the Theogony", who "calls himself Hesiod". But a different critical strain, one which views the transmitted Homeric and Hesiodic poems as ultimate products of rhapsodic recomposition within an oral tradition, would hold that from an initial Hesiodic nucleus the Catalogue arrived at its final form well after the period to which Hesiod has been assigned. Such a scenario could account for perceived anachronisms in the mythological content and in the linguistic character of the poem, but would sidestep the issue of the relation between the Catalogue as it has been transmitted and the broader corpus of early Greek epic.

West argues on poetic, linguistic, cultural and political grounds that an Athenian poet "compiled the Catalogue of Women and attached it to Hesiod's Theogony, as if it were all Hesiodic", sometime between 580 and 520 BCE, and thinks it possible that this range might be narrowed to the period following 540. He sees, for example, the marriage of Xuthus to a daughter of Erechtheus as a means of subordinating all of Ionia to Athens, since their union produced the eponym Ion. Similarly, Sicyon is made a son of Erechtheus (fr. 224), which West takes as a reflection of the tyrant Cleisthenes of Sicyon's attempts to promote Ionian–Athenian interests in the polis, which had traditionally been more closely connected to Dorian Argos. These and other considerations would, in West's view, establish a terminus post quem of c. 575 BCE, but he prefers a later dating on the assumption that Theogony 965–1020, which he assigns to the latter portion of the sixth century BCE, was contemporaneous with the composition of the Catalogue.

West's arguments have been highly influential, but other scholars have arrived at different conclusions using the same evidence. Fowler thinks that the Sicyon genealogy would more likely reflect a composition before Cleisthenes' death (c. 575 BCE) and dates the poem to the period closely following the First Sacred War (595–585 BCE), connecting its content to the growing influence of the Amphictyonic League and placing its author in Aeolian Thessaly because of the Aeolid family-trees centered around that region which dominate the earlier portions of the poem. Hirschberger, on the other hand, takes this focus upon the Aeolids and the Catalogue poet's perceived interest in eastern peoples to be indicative of a poet from Aeolis in Asia Minor; she proposes that the Catalogue was composed there between 630 and 590 BCE, viewing the composition of the Shield of Heracles and an apparent allusion to the poem by Stesichorus (died c. 555 BCE) as providing the ultimate terminus ante quem.

== Reception ==
The Catalogue's greatest influence was felt during the Hellenistic period, when the poem was used as an extra-Homeric touchstone for the poets of the era who favored recondite and antiquarian references over direct engagement with the more prominent members of the canon. The most famous Hellenistic allusion to the Catalogue is found in Hermesianax's Leontion, which included a catalogue of great literary figures and their loves, beginning with Orpheus and Agriope (more commonly known as Eurydice) and proceeding down to the poet's contemporaries, including his teacher Philitas of Cos. Many of the entries engage playfully with their subjects' work: Homer, for example, is portrayed as pining for Penelope. Directly preceding that lovestruck bard comes Hesiod's blurb:

And I also say that, leaving behind his Boeotian home,
Hesiod, the keeper of all inquiry,
went smitten to the Heliconian town of the Ascraeans.
There he, wooing Ascraean Ehoie,
suffered much, and wrote all his books of knowledge
in homage, beginning from his first girlfriend.
φημὶ δὲ καὶ Βοιωτὸν ἀποπρολιπόντα μέλαθρον
Ἡσίοδον πάσης ἤρανον ἱστορίης
Ἀσκραίων ἐσικέσθαι ἐρῶνθ' Ἑλικωνίδα κώμην·
ἔνθεν ὅ γ' Ἠοίην μνώμενος Ἀσκραϊκὴν
πόλλ' ἔπαθεν, πάσας δὲ λόγων ἀνεγράψατο βίβλους
ὑμνῶν, ἐκ πρώτης παιδὸς ἀνερχόμενος.

Here the ē' hoiē-formula is styled as the name of a woman, cleverly rendered "Anne Other" by Helen Asquith, and the grumpy Hesiod who reviled his home in Ascra at Works and Days 639–40 becomes a discomfited lover-boy in the village. Phanocles, a near contemporary of Hermesianax, composed an elegiac catalogue of mythological pederastic relationships entitled the Loves or Beautiful Boys in which each story was introduced by the formula ē' hōs (ἠ' ὡς), "or like". Nicaenetus of Samos, a later Hellenistic poet, wrote his own Catalogue of Women and the otherwise unknown Sosicrates (or Sostratus) of Phanagoria was said to have written an Ehoioi (Ἠοῖοι), the masculine equivalent of "Ehoiai". While allusions to the ehoie-formula and catalogue structure of the poem are most easily recognized, interaction with the Catalogue in Hellenistic poetry was not limited to plays upon these aspects: direct engagement with the myths found in the Catalogue were a popular way for the Alexandrians to show their Hesiodic affiliations.

At Rome the poets of the Late Republic and Augustan age continued the Hellenistic period's allusive engagement with the Catalogue. Catullus, a poet who made plain his Callimachean affiliations, is the earliest Roman author who can be seen to engage with the Catalogue. In his epyllion on the wedding of Peleus and Thetis, Catullus alludes to the theoxeny that the proem to the Catalogue presented as a defining characteristic of the heroic age and to the epithalamium of the couple that was sung in a later book. In the Aeneid Vergil closes his catalogue of combatants with the swift female warrior Camilla, alluding to the Hesiodic account of Iphiclus' speed in "a remarkably subtle nod to tradition in the best Alexandrian style". Ovid picked up on Vergil's allusion in the Metamorphoses with his treatment of Atalanta, which recast's his Roman forebear's allusion to Iphiclus in such a way that it highlights the Hesiodic character of his own poem in contrast with the Homeric character of the Aeneid.

== Transmission and reconstruction ==
It is impossible to tell exactly when the last complete copy of the Catalogue was lost. Fragments of over fifty ancient copies have been found, dating from the Hellenistic period through early Byzantine times. A book label from the century or so after the latest Catalogue papyrus lists the contents of a fifth- or sixth-century Hesiodic codex as "Hesiod's Theogony, Works and Days and Shield", and it appears that by this time the Byzantine triad of Hesiod's works had become the notional corpus, to the detriment of the other poems which had traveled under the poet's name. Knowledge of the Catalogue did not cease altogether with the loss of the final complete copy, however, and well into medieval times authors such as Eustathius and Tzetzes could cite the poem via fragments contained in other ancient authors. Other vestiges of the poem's influence are less clear: the Pseudo-Apollodoran Bibliotheca, an early Roman-era handbook of Greek mythology, for example, is widely believed to have taken the Catalogue as its primary structural model, although this is not stated explicitly within that text.

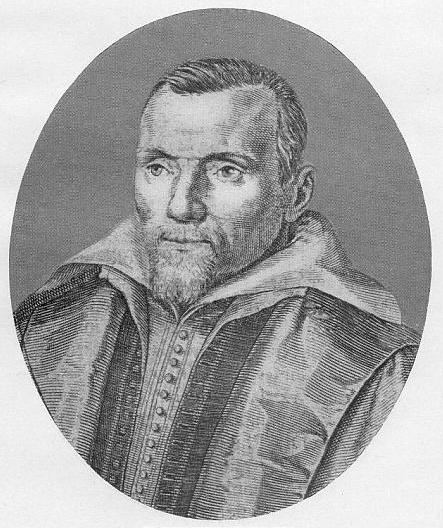
Daniel Heinsius, editor of the first modern collection of the Hesiodic fragments

The collection and interpretation of the Hesiodic fragments in the modern era began during the sixteenth and seventeenth centuries, primarily with the editions of Heinsius (1603) and Graevius (1667). The earliest collections simply presented ancient quotations organized by the quoting author, and it was not until the work of Lehmann (1828), Goettling (1831) and Marckscheffel (1840) that attempts at a proper reconstruction began. Marckscheffel was the first to recognize that the early portions of the poem treated the descendants of Deucalion in a systematic fashion, but he regarded what were called the "Catalogue of Women" and "Ehoiai" as two initially separate works that had been joined: the former was genealogically structured, while the latter, in Marckscheffel's view, simply recounted myths involving notable Thessalian and Boeotian heroines, with each introduced by the ē' hoiē-formula. Since the Ehoie of Alcmene was attested for book 4, Marckscheffel proposed that books 1–3 were the "Catalogue", and books 4 and 5 were the "Ehoiai".

As the nineteenth century progressed, there were several other important observations about the genealogical structure of the Catalogue. In 1860 Adolf Kirchhoff noted the mass of information connected to the family of Io, a stemma which could be assigned to the third book because of an ancient citation placing Phineus, one of her descendants, there. The picture of the Catalogue that was emerging began to resemble the Bibliotheca in structure, but Theodor Bergk was the first to suggest explicitly (though in passing) that the poem might be reconstructed with the help of the mythographic work. Bergk and his contemporaries still largely followed Marckscheffel's conclusion that the Catalogue and Ehoiai were semi-distinct texts, and it was not until 1894 that Friedrich Leo finally demonstrated that these were in fact alternate titles for a single poem.

A few years before Leo's paper, the first small papyrus fragment was found, and the first half of the twentieth century would see the publication of several other pieces which added significantly to the modern text of the Catalogue. Among these finds were important passages, the Catalogue of Suitors and Epithalamium of Peleus and Thetis for example, but few advanced the modern understanding of the work's overall structure. The appearance of the proem in 1956 actually led to a major misapprehension, for the list of gods found therein, beginning with Zeus and proceeding through the divine Heracles, led some to believe that the Catalogue was not organized in a strictly genealogical manner, but presented the unions of gods and heroines organized to some extent by amorous deity. Six years later, with the publication of the 28th volume of the Oxyrhynchus Papyri, the corpus of papyrus witnesses to the fragmentary Hesiodic poems was nearly doubled, with the lion's share of these new texts belonging to the Catalogue. The new papyri proved once and for all that the poem was organized by genealogies of the great families in a way similar to the Bibliotheca, and that the poet's use of the ē' hoiē-formula was not a random method of introduction but an organizing tool within an overall structure.

== Editions and translations ==
=== Critical editions ===
- Heinsius, D. (1603), Hesiodi Ascraei quae extant, Leiden.
- Graevius, J.G. (1667), Hesiodi Ascraei quae extant, Amsterdam.
- Robinson, T. (1737), Hesiodi Ascraei quae supersunt cum notis variorum, Oxford.
- Gaisford, T. (1823), Poetae Minores Graeci, vol. 1, Leipzig: Kuehn.
- Dindorf, L.A. (1825), Hesiodus, Leipzig.
- Lehmann, C. (1828), De Hesiodi carminibus perditis scriptio philologica, Berlin.
- Goettling, C.W. (1831), Hesiodi carmina, Gotha.
- Marckscheffel, G. (1840), Hesiodi, Eumeli, Cinaethonis, Asii et Carminis Naupactii fragmenta, Leipzig: Sumtibus F.C.G. Vogelii.
- Goettling, C.W. (1843), Hesiodi carmina (2nd rev. ed.), Gotha: Henning.
- Lehrs, F.S. (1840), Hesiodi carmina, Paris: editore Ambrosio FirminDidot.
- Kinkel, G. (1877), Epicorum Graecorum fragmenta, vol. 1, Leipzig: Lipsiae, in aedibus B.G. Teubneri.
- Sittl, K. (1889), Ἡσιόδου τὰ ἅπαντα, Athens.
- Rzach, A. (1902), Hesiodi Carmina, Leipzig.
- Rzach, A. (1908), Hesiodi Carmina (2nd rev. ed.), Leipzig.
- Rzach, A. (1913), Hesiodi Carmina (3rd rev. ed.), Leipzig, ISBN 978-3-598-71418-4.
- Traversa, A. (1951), Catalogi sive Eoaearum fragmenta, Naples.
- Merkelbach, R. (1957), Die Hesiodfragmente auf Papyrus, Leipzig.
- Merkelbach, R.; West, M. L. (1967), Fragmenta Hesiodea, Oxford, ISBN 978-0-19-814171-6.
- Merkelbach, R.; West, M. L. (1990), "Fragmenta selecta", in F. Solmsen (ed.), Hesiodi Theogonia, Opera et Dies, Scutum (3rd rev. ed.), Oxford, ISBN 978-0-19-814071-9.
- Hirschberger, M. (2004), Gynaikōn Katalogos und Megalai Ēhoiai: Ein Kommentar zu den Fragmenten zweier hesiodeischer Epen, Munich & Leipzig, ISBN 978-3-598-77810-0.

=== Translations ===
- Mair, A. W. (1908). Hesiod: the Poems and Fragments. Oxford: The Clarendon Press. (To be consulted with caution: out of date even for 1908.)
- Evelyn-White, H. G. (1936). Hesiod, the Homeric Hymns, and Homerica. Loeb Classical Library. Vol. 57 (3rd rev. ed.). Cambridge, MA: London : W. Heinemann. ISBN 978-0-674-99063-0. (The link is to the 1st edition of 1914.) English translation with facing Greek text; now obsolete except for its translations of the ancient quotations.
- Marg, W. (1970). Hesiod: Sämtliche Gedichte. Stuttgart. German translation.
- Arrighetti, G. (1998). Esiodo, Opere. Torino. ISBN 978-88-446-0053-2. Italian translation with facing Greek text; faithfully based upon the editions of Merkelbach and West.
- Most, G. W. (2006). Hesiod: Theogony, Works and Days, Testimonia. Loeb Classical Library. Vol. 57. Cambridge, MA. ISBN 978-0-674-99622-9. Includes ancient assessments of the Catalogue.
- Most, G. W. (2007). Hesiod: The Shield, Catalogue, Other Fragments. Loeb Classical Library. Vol. 503. Cambridge, MA. ISBN 978-0-674-99623-6. English translation with facing Greek text; takes much recent scholarship into consideration.

== Bibliography ==
Jump to : A – B – C – D – E – F – G – H – I – J – K – L – M – N – O – P – Q – R – S – T – U – V – W – X – Y – Z
- Aguirre Castro, M. (2005), "Expressions of Love and Sexual Union in Hesiod's Catalogue of Women", CFC (G): Estudios griegos e indoeuropeos, 15: 19–25.
- Alfonsi, L. (1949), "Ps.-Esiodo in Properzio?", Revue de Philologie, 1: 17–26.
- Andersen, Ø.; Haugh, D.T.T. (2011), Relative Chronology in Early Greek Epic Poetry, Cambridge, ISBN 9780521194976.
- Arrighetti, A., "Il Catalogo esiodeo: un genere letterario?", in Bastianini & Casanova (2008), pp. 11–27.
- Arthur, M.B. (1984), "Early Greece: The Origins of the Western Attitude toward Women", in J. Peradotto; J.P. Sullivan (eds.), Women in the Ancient World: The Arethusa Papers, Albany, pp. 7–58, ISBN 978-0-87395-773-1.
- Asquith, H. (2005), "From Genealogy to Catalogue: The Hellenistic Adaptation of the Hesiodic Catalogue Form", in Hunter (2005a), pp. 266–86.
- Barron, J.P.; Easterling, P.E., "Hesiod", in Easterling & Knox (1985), pp. 92–105.
- Bastianini, G.; Casanova, A. (2008), Esiodo. cent'anni di papiri, Florence, ISBN 978-88-87829-36-5.
- Beck, W. (1980), "Hesiod Fr. 204, 127 M.–W.", Zeitschrift für Papyrologie und Epigraphik, 38: 46, JSTOR 20171844.
- Bergk, T. (1872), Griechische Litteraturgeschichte, vol. i, Berlin.
- Boyd, B.W. (1992), "Virgil's Camilla and the Traditions of Catalogue and Ecphrasis (Aeneid 7.803–17)", American Journal of Philology, 113 (2): 213–34, doi:10.2307/295558, JSTOR 295558.
- Cantilena, M. (1979), "Le Eoeae e la tradizione orale", Athenaeum, 97: 139–45.
- Cardin, M (2009), "Heroogonia. Il Catalogo delle donne di Giovanni Tzetze", Philologus, 153 (2): 237–49, doi:10.1524/phil.2009.0018, S2CID 161507691.
- Casanova, A. (1967a), "Sulla tecnica narrativa in alcuni passi delle Eee", Rivista di Filologia e di Istruzione Classica, 96: 31–8.
- Casanova, A. (1968), "Le nipoti di Atamante nel Catalogo esiodeo", Studi Italiani di Filologia Classica, 40: 169–77.
- Casanova, A. (1969a), "Il mito di Atteone nel Catalogo esiodeo", Rivista di Filologia e di Istruzione Classica, 97: 31–46.
- Casanova, A. (1969b), "(review of Merkelbach & West (1967))", Rivista di Filologia e di Istruzione Classica, 97: 452–60.
- Casanova, A. (1970), "Tre note al Catalogo esiodeo", Studia Florentina Alexandro Ronconi Sexagenario Oblata, Rome, pp. 61–7.
- Casanova, A. (1973), "Un frammento trascurato e il problema della divisione in libri del Catalogo esiodeo", Studi Italiani di Filologia Classica, 45: 3–27.
- Casanova, A. (1977), "Lite per un matrimonio truffaldino nella Grecia arcaica (Hes. fr. 43 M.–W.)", Prometheus, 3: 21–38.
- Casanova, A. (1978), "Mestra e il re Cos in Esiodo", Prometheus, 4: 202–6.
- Casanova, A. (1979), La famiglia di Pandora: analisi filologica dei miti di Pandora e Prometeo nella tradizione esiodea, Florence.
- Casanova, A., "Cent'anni di papiri esiodei", in Bastianini & Casanova (2008), pp. 1–10.
- Cassio, A.C., "The Language of Hesiod and the Corpus Hesiodeum", in Montanari, Rengakos & Tsagalis (2009), pp. 179–201.
- Cingano, E. (2005), "A Catalogue within a Catalogue: Helen's Suitors in the Hesiodic Catalogue of Women (frr. 196–204)", in Hunter (2005a), pp. 118–52.
- Cingano, E., "The Hesiodic Corpus", in Montanari, Rengakos & Tsagalis (2009), pp. 91–130.
- Clausen, W.V., "The New Direction in Poetry", in Kenney & Clausen (1982), pp. 178–206.
- Clauss, J.J. (1990), "Hellenistic Imitations of Hesiod Catalogue of Women fr. 1, 6–7 M.-W.", Quaderni Urbinati di Cultura Classica, 36 (3): 129–40, doi:10.2307/20547068, JSTOR 20547068
- Clay, J.S. (2003), Hesiod's Cosmos, Cambridge, ISBN 978-1-139-44058-5.
- Clay, J.S. (2005), "The Beginning and End of the Hesiodic Catalogue of Women and its Relation to Hesiod", in Hunter (2005a), pp. 25–34.
- Cohen, I.M. (1986), "The Hesiodic Catalogue of Women and Megalai Ehoiai", Phoenix, 40 (2): 127–42, doi:10.2307/1088507, JSTOR 1088507.
- Cohen, I.M. (1989–1990), "Traditional Language and the Women in the Hesiodic Catalogue of Women", Scripta Classica Israelica, 10: 12–27, doi:10.71043/sci.v10i.4613.
- Crönert, W. (1907), "Nachprüfung der Berliner Reste der Hesiodischen Kataloge", Hermes, 42 (4): 608–13, JSTOR 4473100.
- D'Alessio, G.B. (1996), "Esiodo, fr. 193,8 M.–W.", Zeitschrift für Papyrologie und Epigraphik, 110: 100, JSTOR 20189670.
- D'Alessio, G.B. (2005a), "The Megalai Ehoiai: A Survey of the Fragments", in Hunter (2005a), pp. 176–216.
- D'Alessio, G.B. (2005b). "Ordered from the Catalogue: Pindar, Bacchylides and Hesiodic Genealogical Poetry". In Hunter (2005a), pp. 217–38..
- D'Alessio, G.B. (2005c), "review of Hirschberger (2004)", Bryn Mawr Classical Review, 2005.02.31.
- Davies, M. (1986), "(review of West (1985a))", Classical Review, 36 (1): 6–8, doi:10.1017/S0009840X00104779, JSTOR 3064211, S2CID 163229375.
- De Sanctis, D., "La geografia mitica del Catalogo: Europa e Fineo", in Bastianini & Casanova (2008), pp. 129–51.
- DePew, M. (1994), "POxy 2509 and Callimachus' Lavacrum Palladis: αἰγιόχοιο Διὸς κούρη μεγάλοιο", Classical Quarterly, 44 (2): 410–26, doi:10.1017/s000983880004386x, JSTOR 639644, S2CID 170911616.
- Doherty, L.E. (2006), "Putting the Women back into the Hesiodic Catalogue of Women", in M. Leonard; V. Zajko (eds.), Laughing at Medusa: Classical Myth and Feminist Thought, Oxford, pp. 297–325, ISBN 978-0-19-927438-3.
- Doherty, L.E. (2008), "Nausikaa and Tyro: Idylls of Courtship in the Phaiakian Episode of the Odyssey and the Hesiodic Catalogue of Women", Phoenix, 62: 63–76.
- Dräger, P. (1993), Argo Pasimelousa. Der Argonautenmythos in der griechischen und römischen Literatur. Teil 1: Theos aitios, Stuttgart, ISBN 978-3-515-05974-9.
- Dräger, P. (1997), Untersuchungen zu den Frauenkatalogen Hesiods, Stuttgart, ISBN 978-3-515-07028-7.
- Easterling, P.E.; Knox, B.M.W. (1985), The Cambridge History of Classical Literature: Greek Literature, Cambridge, ISBN 978-0-521-21042-3.
- Edwards, G.P. (1980), "The Structure of Homeric Catalogues", Transactions of the American Philological Association, 110: 81–105, doi:10.2307/284212, JSTOR 284212.
- Finkelberg, M. (1988), "Ajax's Entry in the Hesiodic Catalogue of Women", Classical Quarterly, 38 (1): 31–41, doi:10.1017/s0009838800031232, JSTOR 639202, S2CID 170458787.
- Fletcher, K. (2006), "review of Hunter (2005a)", Bryn Mawr Classical Review, 2006.10.03.
- Fletcher, R. (2005), "Or such as Ovid's Metamorphoses ...", in Hunter (2005a), pp. 299–319.
- Fowler, R.L. (1998), "Genealogical Thinking, Hesiod's Catalogue, and the Creation of the Hellenes", Cambridge Classical Journal, 44: 1–19, doi:10.1017/s0068673500002200, S2CID 140149089.
- Führer, R. (1989), "Hes. P.Oxy. 2509", Museum Helveticum, 46: 237–8, archived from the original on 2012-04-06.
- Gagné, R.; Höschele, R. (2009), "Works and Nights (Marcus Argentarius, AP 9.161)", Cambridge Classical Journal, 55: 59–72, doi:10.1017/S1750270500000191, S2CID 170585508.
- Garvie, A.F. (1988), Aeschylus: Choephori, Oxford, ISBN 978-0-19-872134-5.
- Giangrande, G. (1970), "Hesiod's Fragments (review of Merkelbach & West (1967))", Classical Review, 20 (2): 151–6, doi:10.1017/s0009840x00262197, JSTOR 709670, S2CID 162996620.
- Gonzalez, J.M. (2010), "The Catalogue of Women and the End of the Heroic Age (Hes. fr. 204.94–103 M–W)", Transactions of the American Philological Association, 140 (2): 375–422, doi:10.1353/apa.2010.a402238, JSTOR 40890984, S2CID 259787408.
- Griffin, J. (1977), "The Epic Cycle and the Uniqueness of Homer", Journal of Hellenic Studies, 97: 39–53, doi:10.2307/631020, JSTOR 631020, S2CID 163041110.
- Hadjicosti, I.L. (2005), "Hesiod fr. 212B (MW): Death at the Skaean Gates", Mnemosyne, 68 (4): 547–54, JSTOR 4433685.
- Hardie, P. (2005), "The Hesiodic Catalogue of Women and Latin Poetry", in Hunter (2005a), pp. 287–98.
- Haubold, J. (2005), "Heracles in the Hesiodic Catalogue of Women", in Hunter (2005a), pp. 85–98.
- Heilinger, K. (1983), "Der Freierkatalog der Helena im hesiodeischen Frauenkatalog I", Museum Helveticum, 40: 19–34, archived from the original on 2012-04-06.
- Hirschberger, M., "Il tema della metamorfosi nel Catalogo esiodeo delle donne", in Bastianini & Casanova (2008), pp. 113–27.
- Hopkinson, N. (1984), Callimachus: Hymn to Demeter, Cambridge, ISBN 978-0-521-60436-9.
- Hopkinson, N. (1988), A Hellenistic Anthology, Cambridge, ISBN 978-0-521-31425-1.
- Hornblower, S.; Spawforth, A. (1996), Oxford Classical Dictionary (3rd rev. ed.), Oxford, ISBN 978-0-19-866172-6.
- Hunter, R. (1999), Theocritus: A Selection, Cambridge, ISBN 978-0-521-57416-7.
- Hunter, R. (2005a), The Hesiodic Catalogue of Women: Constructions and Reconstructions, Cambridge, ISBN 978-0-521-83684-5.
- Hunter, R. (2005b), Introduction, in Hunter (2005a), pp. 1–4.
- Hunter, R. (2005c), "The Hesiodic Catalogue and Hellenistic Poetry", in Hunter (2005a), pp. 1–4.
- Irwin, E. (2005), "Gods among Men? The Social and Political Dynamics of the Hesiodic Catalogue of Women", in Hunter (2005a), pp. 35–84.
- Janko, R. (1982), Homer, Hesiod and the Hymns, Cambridge, ISBN 978-0-521-23869-4.
- Janko, R. (1984), "P.Oxy. 2509: Hesiod's Catalogue on the Death of Actaeon", Phoenix, 38 (4): 299–307, doi:10.2307/1088377, JSTOR 1088377.
- Janko, R., "πρῶτόν τε καὶ ὕστατιον αἰὲν ἀείδειν: Relative Chronology and the Literary History of Early Greek Epos", in Andersen & Haugh (2011), pp. 20–43.
- Johnson, M. (2003), "Catullus 2b: The Development of a Relationship in the Passer Trilogy", The Classical Journal, 99 (1): 11–34, JSTOR 3298079.
- Kakridis, J.-Th. (1958), "Ποίκιλα Ἑλληνικά", Ελληνικά, 16: 219–22.
- Kakridis, J.-Th. (1975), "Μήστρα: Zu Hesiods frg. 43a M.–W.", Zeitschrift für Papyrologie und Epigraphik, 18: 17–25, JSTOR 20180888.
- Kakridis, J.-Th. (1978a), "Periklymenos: Zu Hesiods frg. 33 M.–W.", Zeitschrift für Papyrologie und Epigraphik, 28: 173–7, JSTOR 20181504.
- Kakridis, J.-Th. (1978b), "Pleistheniden oder Atriden? Zu Hesiods frg. 195 M.–W.", Zeitschrift für Papyrologie und Epigraphik, 30: 1–4, JSTOR 20181585.
- Kenney, E.J.; Clausen, W.V. (1982), The Cambridge History of Classical Literature: Latin Literature, Cambridge, ISBN 978-0-521-21043-0.
- Kirchhoff, A. (1860), "Homerische excurse", Philologus, 15 (1–3): 1–29, doi:10.1524/phil.1860.15.13.1, S2CID 164689571.
- Leo, F. (1894), "Hesiodea", Ausgewählte kleine Schriften, vol. ii, Rome, pp. 343–63.
- Lightfoot, J.L. (2009), Hellenistic Collection: Philitas, Alexander of Aetolia, Hermesianax, Euphorion, Parthenius, Loeb Classical Library, Cambridge, MA, ISBN 978-0-674-99636-6.
- Lloyd-Jones, H.; Parsons, P. (1983), Supplementum Hellenisticum, Berlin, ISBN 978-3-11-008171-8.
- Lobel, E. (1956), The Oxyrhynchus Papyri: Part XXIII, London.
- Lobel, E. (1962), The Oxyrhynchus Papyri: Part XXVIII, London.
- Lobel, E. (1964), The Oxyrhynchus Papyri: Part XXX, London.
- López García, A. (1995), "Esiodo, Fr. 193. Riesame di PSI II 131 e nuovi acquisti testuali (PLit.Palau Rib. 21)", Zeitschrift für Papyrologie und Epigraphik, 107: 53–6, JSTOR 20189548.
- Lyons, D. (2003), "Dangerous Gifts: Ideologies of Marriage and Exchange in Ancient Greece", Classical Antiquity, 22 (1): 93–134, doi:10.1525/ca.2003.22.1.93, JSTOR 10.1525/ca.2003.22.1.93.
- Malten, L. (1911), Kyrene, sagengeschichtliche und historische Untersuchungen, Berlin.
- Marquardt, P.A. (1982), "Hesiod's Ambiguous View of Women", Classical Philology, 77 (4): 283–91, doi:10.1086/366727, JSTOR 269412, S2CID 162865268.
- March, J. (1987), The Creative Poet: Studies on the Treatment of Myths in Greek Poetry, London, ISBN 978-0-900587-52-8.
- March, J.R. (1988), "Peleus and Achilles in the Catalogue of Women", in B.G. Mandilaras; et al. (eds.), Proceedings of the XVIIIth international Congress of papyrology, Athens 25–31 May 1986, vol. i, Athens, pp. 345–52, ISBN 978-960-85019-0-4.
- Marcotte, D. (1988), "Héros divinisés et simulacres dans le catalogue hésiodique des femmes", Antiquité Classique, 57: 248‒57.
- Martin, R.P. (2005), "Pulp Epic: The Catalogue and the Shield", in Hunter (2005a), pp. 153–75.
- McLeod, G. (1991), Virtue and Venom: Catalogs of Women from Antiquity to the Renaissance, Ann Arbor, ISBN 978-0-472-10206-8.
- Meliadò, C. (2003), "Un nuovo frammento esiodeo in uno scolio a Teocrito", Zeitschrift für Papyrologie und Epigraphik, 145: 1–5, JSTOR 20191692.
- Merkelbach, R. (1951a), "Über zwei epische Papyri", Aegyptus, 31: 254–60.
- Merkelbach, R. (1951b), "Zur Einordnung der neuen Fragmente", Aegyptus, 31: 268.
- Merkelbach, R. (1955), "(review of Traversa (1951))", Gnomon, 27: 4–6.
- Merkelbach, R. (1962), "(review of Schwartz (1960))", Gnomon, 34: 457–60.
- Merkelbach, R. (1968a), "Hesiod Fr. 150, 25 M.–W.", Zeitschrift für Papyrologie und Epigraphik, 2: 6.
- Merkelbach, R. (1968b), "Zu Hesiod Fr. 23 und 30 M.–W.", Zeitschrift für Papyrologie und Epigraphik, 2: 210.
- Merkelbach, R. (1968c), "Das Prooemium des hesiodeischen Katalogs", Zeitschrift für Papyrologie und Epigraphik, 3: 126–33.
- Merkelbach, R. (1968d), "Hesiod Fr. 43(a)41ff. M.–W.", Zeitschrift für Papyrologie und Epigraphik, 3: 134–5.
- Merkelbach, R.; West, M. L. (1965), "The Wedding of Ceyx" (PDF), Rheinisches Museum für Philologie, 108 (4): 300–17, JSTOR 41244271.
- Montanari, F.; Rengakos, A.; Tsagalis, C. (2009), Brill's Companion to Hesiod, Leiden, ISBN 978-90-04-17840-3.
- Most, G.W., "Two Hesiodic Papyri", in Bastianini & Casanova (2008), pp. 55–70.
- Mureddu, P., "Epiteti femminili nel Catalogo esiodeo", in Bastianini & Casanova (2008), pp. 97–112.
- Nagy, G. (1999), The Best of the Achaeans: Concepts of the Hero in Archaic Greek Poetry (2nd ed.), Baltimore, ISBN 978-0-8018-6015-7, archived from the original on 2016-03-03 (cited by chapter and paragraph numbers which are employed in both the print and on-line editions).
- Nasta, M. (2006), "La typologie des catalogues d'Éhées: Un réseau généalogique thématisé", Kernos, 19: 59–78, doi:10.4000/kernos.430 (cited by paragraph of the online edition).
- O'Callaghan, J. (1996), "Nota paleográfica sobre PLit. Palau Rib. 21", Zeitschrift für Papyrologie und Epigraphik, 110: 101–2.
- Ormand, K. (2004), "Marriage, Identity, and the Tale of Mestra in the Hesiodic Catalogue of Women", American Journal of Philology, 125 (3): 303–38, doi:10.1353/ajp.2004.0030, JSTOR 1562169, PMID 21966749, S2CID 36204915.
- Osborne, R. (2005), "Ordering Women in Hesiod's Catalogue", in Hunter (2005a), pp. 5–24.
- Pfeiffer, R. (1937), "Hesiodisches und Homerisches", Philologus, 92 (1–4): 1–18, doi:10.1524/phil.1937.92.14.1, S2CID 164991525.
- Pontani, F. (2000), "Catullus 64 and the Hesiodic Catalogue: A Suggestion", Philologus, 144 (2): 267–76, doi:10.1524/phil.2000.144.2.267, S2CID 163052183.
- Powell, J.U. (1925), Collectanea Alexandrina, Oxford.
- Reinsch-Werner, H. (1976), Callimachus Hesiodicus: Die Rezeption der hesiodischen Dichtung durch Kallimachos von Kyrene, Berlin.
- Reitzenstein, R. (1900), "Die Hochzeit des Peleus und der Thetis", Hermes, 35 (1): 73–105, JSTOR 4472723.
- Renner, T. (1978), "A Papyrus Dictionary of Metamorphoses", Harvard Studies in Classical Philology, 82: 277–93, doi:10.2307/311036, JSTOR 311036.
- Rutherford, I. (2000), "Formulas, Voice, and Death in Ehoie-Poetry, the Hesiodic Gunaikon Katalogos, and the Odysseian Nekuia", in M. Depew; D. Obbink (eds.), Matrices of Genre: Authors, Canons, and Society, Cambridge, MA, pp. 81–96, ISBN 978-0-674-00338-5.
- Rutherford, I. (2005), "Mestra at Athens: Hesiod fr. 43 and the Poetics of Panhellenism", in Hunter (2005a), pp. 99–117.
- Rutherford, I., "The Catalogue of Women within the Greek epic tradition: Allusion, Intertextuality and traditional referentiality", in Andersen & Haugh (2011), pp. 152–67.
- Schmidt, A. (1975), "Zum Prooimion des hesiodeischen Frauenkatalogs", Würzburger Jahrbücher für die Altertumswissenschaft, 1: 19–31.
- Schwartz, J. (1960), Pseudo-Hesiodeia: recherches sur la composition, la diffusion et la disparition ancienne d'oeuvres attribuées à Hésiode, Leiden.
- Sistakou, E., "Callimachus Hesiodicus Revisited", in Montanari, Rengakos & Tsagalis (2009), pp. 219–52.
- Solmsen, F. (1981), "The Sacrifice of Agamemnon's Daughter in Hesiod's Ehoeae", American Journal of Philology, 102 (4): 353–58, doi:10.2307/294322, JSTOR 294322.
- Solmsen, F. (1982), "The Earliest Stages in Hesiod's Text", Harvard Studies in Classical Philology, 86: 1–31, doi:10.2307/311181, JSTOR 311181.
- Stiewe, K. (1960), "Zum Hesiodpapyrus B Merkelbach", Hermes, 88 (2): 253–6, JSTOR 4475117.
- Stiewe, K. (1962), "Die Entstehungszeit der hesiodischen Frauenkataloge", Philologus, 106 (1–2): 291–99, doi:10.1524/phil.1962.106.12.291, S2CID 164444376.
- Stiewe, K. (1963a), "Die Entstehungszeit der hesiodischen Frauenkataloge (Fortsetzung und Schluss)", Philologus, 107: 1–29, doi:10.1524/phil.1963.107.12.1, S2CID 201840661.
- Stiewe, K. (1963b), "(review of Schwartz (1960))", GGA, 215: 152–4.
- Stiewe, K. (1964a), "Ein Nachtrag zum Hesiodpapyrus A Merkelbach", Philologus, 108: 291–2.
- Stiewe, K. (1964b), "(review of P.Oxy. XXVIII)", GGA, 216: 108–14.
- Treu, M. (1957), "Das Proömium der hesiodischen Frauenkataloge" (PDF), Rheinisches Museum für Philologie, 100 (2): 169–86, JSTOR 41244044.
- Uebel, F. (1973), "Literarische Texte unter Ausschluss der christlichen, no. 1275", Archiv für Papyrusforschung, 22: 362.
- Vian, F. (1961), "Poèmes hésiodiques et pseudo-hésiodiques", Revue des Études Grecques, 74 (349): 269–74, doi:10.3406/reg.1961.3651.
- West, M. L. (1961), "Hesiodea", Classical Quarterly, 11 (3–4): 130–45, doi:10.1017/s0009838800015469, S2CID 246875859.
- West, M. L. (1962a), "Pseudo-Hesiod (review of Schwartz (1960))", Classical Review, 12: 17–19, doi:10.1017/S0009840X00212699, S2CID 162780875.
- West, M. L. (1962b), "More Notes on the Text of Hesiod", Classical Quarterly, 12 (2): 177–81, doi:10.1017/S0009838800001403, S2CID 170271754.
- West, M. L. (1963a), "Iolkos in der griechischen Dichtung", Glotta, 41: 278–82.
- West, M. L. (1963b), "γλωθρός", Glotta, 41: 282–5.
- West, M. L. (1963c), "(review of P.Oxy. XXVIII)", Gnomon, 35: 752–9.
- West, M. L. (1966a), Hesiod: Theogony, Oxford, ISBN 978-0-19-814169-3.
- West, M. L. (1966b), "New Fragments of Greek Poetry", Classical Review, 16 (1): 21–4, doi:10.1017/s0009840x00320182, JSTOR 706514, S2CID 162652916.
- West, M. L. (1969), "Echoes and Imitations of the Hesiodic Poems", Philologus, 113 (1–2): 1–9, doi:10.1524/phil.1969.113.12.1, S2CID 164413054.
- West, M. L. (1970), "Hesiod, Fragmenta, again (response to Giangrande (1970)", Classical Review, 20: 416, doi:10.1017/S0009840X00227972, S2CID 246880237.
- West, M. L. (1973), "Greek Poetry 2000–700 B.C.", Classical Quarterly, 23 (2): 179–92, doi:10.1017/s0009838800036648, JSTOR 638170, S2CID 170581047.
- West, M. L. (1978), Hesiod: Works & Days, Oxford, ISBN 978-0-19-814005-4.
- West, M. L. (1983), "The Hesiodic Catalogue: Xouthids and Aiolids", Zeitschrift für Papyrologie und Epigraphik, 53: 33–6, JSTOR 20183911.
- West, M. L. (1985a), The Hesiodic Catalogue of Women: Its Nature, Structure, and Origins, Oxford, ISBN 978-0-19-814034-4.
- West, M. L. (1985b), "The Hesiodic Catalogue: New Light on Apollo's Love-Life", Zeitschrift für Papyrologie und Epigraphik, 61: 1–7, JSTOR 20184321.
- West, M. L. (1986), "Further Echoes and Imitations of the Hesiodic Poems", Philologus, 130 (1–2): 1–7, doi:10.1524/phil.1986.130.12.1, S2CID 165031840.
- West, M. L. (1987), "Iaon", Zeitschrift für Papyrologie und Epigraphik, 67: 20.
- West, M. L. (1988), "The Rise of the Greek Epic", Journal of Hellenic Studies, 108: 151–72, doi:10.2307/632637, JSTOR 632637, S2CID 162976726.
- West, M. L. (1999), "The Invention of Homer", Classical Quarterly, 49 (2): 364–82, doi:10.1093/cq/49.2.364, JSTOR 639863.
- West, M. L. (2001), "Some Homeric Words", Glotta, 77 (1/2): 118–35, JSTOR 40262722.
- West, M. L. (2003), Greek Epic Fragments, Loeb Classical Library, Cambridge, MA, ISBN 978-0-674-99605-2.
- West, M. L. (2006a), "(review of Hirschberger (2004))", Gnomon, 79: 289–94, doi:10.17104/0017-1417_2007_4_289.
- West, M. L. (2006b), "The Catalogue of Women (review of Hunter (2005a))", Classical Review, 56: 275–6, doi:10.1017/S0009840X06001442, S2CID 162220135.
- West, M. L., "The Hesiod Papyri and the Archaic Epic Language", in Bastianini & Casanova (2008), pp. 29–42.
- Wilamowitz-Moellendorf, U. von (1900), "Neue Brüchstucke der Hesiodischen Kataloge", Sitzungsberichte der Kaiserlichen Akademie der Wissenschaften: 839–51.
- Wilamowitz-Moellendorf, U. von (1905), "Lesefrüchte", Hermes, 40 (1): 116–53, JSTOR 4472979.
- Ziogas, I. (2011), "Ovid as a Hesiodic Poet: Atalanta in the Catalogue of Women (fr. 72–6 M–W) and the Metamorphoses (10.560–707)", Mnemosyne, 64 (2): 249–70, doi:10.1163/156852511x505051, S2CID 162338486.
- Ziogas, I. (2013), Ovid and Hesiod: The Metamorphosis of the Catalogue of Women, Cambridge, ISBN 9781107007413.
- Zutt, G. (1894), "Über den Katalog der Heroinen in der Nekyia", Beilage zum Programm des grossher-zoglichen Gymnasiums Baden-Baden für das Schuljahr 1893/94, Leipzig.
