= Arabius (mythology) =

Son of the god Hermes

In Greek mythology, Arabius or Arabus (Ancient Greek: Ἀράβιος or Ἄραβος, romanized: Arabios) may refer to the following distinct or identical individuals:

- Arabius, eponym of Arabia, and the son of Hermes and Thronia, daughter of King Belus of Egypt. He fathered Cassiopeia, wife of King Phoenix of Phoenicia.
- Arabus, son of Apollo and Babylon. He may also be the same as the above.
