= Nessus (mythology) =

Greek mythological figures

In Greek mythology, Nessus (/ˈnɛsəs/; Ancient Greek: Νέσσος, romanized: Néssos) may refer to the following personages:

- Nessus, the river-god of the river Nestus (also called Nessus or Nesus) in Thrace. He is the son of the Titans Oceanus and Tethys, and the father of the naiad Callirrhoe who mothered Biston, Odomas and Edonus by Ares. Nestus is possibly the father of another Bistonian naiad Thronia, mother of Abderus by Poseidon.
- Nessus, a centaur who attempted to violate Deianeira, the wife of Heracles, and thus killed by the hero.
- Nessus, a Trojan warrior who participated in the Trojan War. He was slain by the Achaean hero, Ajax the Greater.
