= Thronia =

In Greek mythology, the name Thronia or Thronie (Ancient Greek: Θρωνία or Θρωνίη, lit. 'of the throne') may refer to:

- Thronia, daughter of King Belus of Egypt, and the mother of Arabus, the eponym of Arabia, by Hermes.
- Thronia, a Naiad nymph, mother of Abderus by Poseidon and the eponym of the city Thronion in Opuntian Locris. Her father was possibly the river god Nestus in Bistonia and thus probably the sister of Callirhoe.
