= Cassiopeia (wife of Phoenix) =

Character from Greek mythology

In Greek mythology, Cassiopeia (/ˌkæsi.oʊˈpiː.ə/; Ancient Greek: Κασσιόπεια, romanized: Kassiópeia), also Cassiepeia (Ancient Greek: Κασσιέπεια, romanized: Kassiépeia), was the daughter of Arabus (Arabius) and by King Phoenix of Phoenicia, the mother of Phineus and Carme, although the latter is more often said to be a daughter of Eubuleus, a Cretan. Other sources claim that she was the mother of the hero Atymnius by her own husband or by the god Zeus. Anchinos was also called the son of Cassiopeia and Zeus who seduced her by changing himself into the shape of her husband Phoenix.
